= List of Victory ships (C) =

This is a list of Victory ships with names beginning with C.

== Description ==
A Victory ship was a cargo ship. The cargo ships were 455 feet 3 inches (138.76 m) overall, 436 feet 6 inches (133.05 m) between perpendiculars They had a beam of 62 feet 0 inches (18.90 m), a depth of 38 feet 0 inches (11.58 m) and a draught of 28 feet 0 inches (8.53 m). They were assessed at 7,612 GRT, 4,555 NRT and 10,750 DWT.

The ships were powered by a triple expansion steam engine, driving a steam turbine via double reduction gear. This gave the ship a speed of 15.5 knots (28.7 km/h) or 16.5 knots (30.6 km/h), depending on the machinery installed.

Liberty ships had five holds. No. 1 hold was 57 feet 6 inches (17.53 m) long, with a capacity of 81,715 cubic feet (2,313.9 m^{3}), No. 2 hold was 45 feet 0 inches (13.72 m) long, with a capacity of 89,370 cubic feet (2,531 m^{3}), No. 3 hold was 78 feet 0 inches (23.77 m) long, with a capacity of 158,000 cubic feet (4,500 m^{3}), No. 4 hold was 81 feet 0 inches (24.69 m) long, with a capacity of 89,370 cubic feet (2,531 m^{3}) and No. 5 hold was 75 feet 0 inches (22.86 m) long, with a capacity of 81,575 cubic feet (2,309.9 m^{3}).

In wartime service, they carried a crew of 62, plus 28 gunners. The ships carried four lifeboats. Two were powered, with a capacity of 27 people and two were unpowered, with a capacity of 29 people.

== Calvin Victory ==
Calvin Victory was built by California Shipbuilding Corporation, Terminal Island, Los Angeles, California. Her keel was laid on 13 February 1945. She was launched on 5 April and delivered on 28 April. Built for the War Shipping Administration (WSA), she was operated under the management of Burns Steamship Company. Sold in 1947 to Isbrandtsen Co., New York and renamed Columbia Heights. Sold in 1959 to Marine Navigation Co., Wilmington, Delaware and renamed Marine Voyager. Converted to a bulk carrier in February 1965 by Bethlehem Steel, Baltimore, Maryland. Now 546 feet 6 inches (166.57 m) long, 9,863 GRT, 14,167 DWT. Renamed Marine Victory in 1966. Sold in 1975 to Compania United Brilliant (Panama) S.A., Panama and renamed Summit Victory. She was scrapped in Taiwan in 1976.

== Canada Victory ==
Canada Victory was built by Oregon Shipbuilding Corporation, Portland, Oregon. Her keel was laid on 20 April 1944. She was launched on 30 May and delivered on 23 June. Built for the WSA, she was operated under the management of Alaska Steamship Company. She was struck by a kamikaze attack at Okinawa, Japan (26°23′N 127°41′E) whilst on a voyage from San Francisco, California to Okinawa. She exploded and sank. Thirty people were killed on 17 April 1958 when an explosion occurred during salvage operations.

== Canton Victory ==
Canton Victory was built by Permanente Metals Corporation, Richmond, California. Her keel was laid on 10 May 1945. She was launched on 20 June and delivered on 21 July. Built for the WSA, she was operated under the management of Sudden & Christenson. Laid up at Mobile, Alabama in 1950. Later transferred to Beaumont, Texas. She was scrapped at Nantong, China in 1989.

== Capital Victory ==
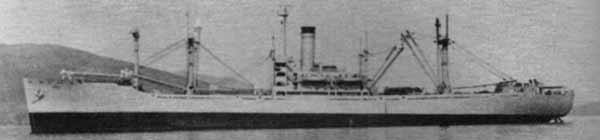
USNS Phoenix

Capitol Victory was built by Oregon Shipbuilding Corporation. Her keel was laid on 27 February 1945. She was launched on 10 April and delivered on 8 May. Built for the WSA, she was operated under the management of Alaska Steamship Company. Sold in 1948 to Pacific-Atlantic Steamship Company, Tacoma, Washington and renamed Arizona. Sold in 1955 to States Steamship Company, Tacoma. To the United States Department of Commerce in 1961. To the Military Sea Transportation Service in 1963 and renamed Phoenix. Used as a depot ship. Decommissioned in 1970, she was scrapped at Kaohsiung, Taiwan in 1984.

== Carleton Victory ==
Carleton Victory was built by Permanente Metals Corporation. Her keel was laid on 3 February 1945. She was launched on 17 March and delivered on 11 April. Built for the WSA, she was operated under the management of Isthmian Steamship Company. Laid up in the James River in 1945, later transferred to Suisun Bay. She was scrapped at Kaohsiung in 1993.

== Carroll Victory ==
Carroll Victory was built by California Shipbuilding Corporation. Her keel was laid on 28 March 1944. She was launched on 13 June and delivered on 31 August. Built for the WSA, she was operated under the management of Lykes Brothers Steamship Company. Laid up at Mobile in 1949, later transferred to the James River. She was scrapped at Alang, India in 1993.

== Carthage Victory ==
Carthage Victory was built by Permanente Metals Corporation. Her keel was laid on 7 June 1945. She was launched on 14 July and delivered on 30 August. Built for the WSA, she was operated under the management of Mississippi Shipping Co. Sold in 1947 to Ocean Steamship Co., Liverpool, United Kingdom and renamed Mentor. Operated under the management of A. Holt & Co. Sold in 1967 to Seawave Navigation Inc., Piraeus, Greece. Sold in 1967 to Western Star Steamship Inc., Panama and renamed Vita. Sold in 1968 to Cullum Compania Navigation S.A., Panama and renamed Viva. Renamed Syra in 1971. She was scrapped at Split, Yugoslavia in September 1971.

== Catawba Victory ==
Catawba Victory was built by Permanente Metals Corporation. Her keel was laid on 30 April 1945. She was launched on 6 June and delivered on 17 July. Built for the WSA, she was operated under the management of Oliver J. Olson. Laid up at Wilmington, Delaware in 1948. Later transferred to the James River. She was allocated to a Virginia shipbreaker for disposal in 2003.

== C. C. N. Y. Victory ==
C. C. N. Y. Victory was a troop transport built by Bethlehem Fairfield Shipyard, Baltimore, Maryland. Her keel was laid on 15 May 1945. She was launched on 23 June and delivered on 26 July. Built for the WSA, she was operated under the management of William J. Rountree Company. Laid up in the James River in 1946. She was scrapped at Alang in 1994.

== Cedar Rapids Victory ==
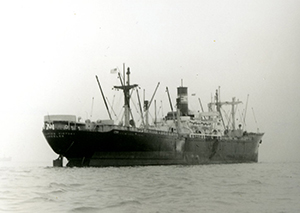
Cedar Rapids Victory

Cedar Rapids Victory was built by California Shipbuilding Corporation. Her keel was laid on 25 November 1944. She was launched on 14 January 1945 and delivered on 7 February. Built for the WSA, she was operated under the management of American-West African Line. She was converted to a livestock carrier by Todd Shipyards, Brooklyn, New York in 1946. Laid up at Wilmington, North Carolina in 1948. Later transferred to Beaumont. She was scrapped at Brownsville, Texas in 1985.

== Central Falls Victory ==
Central Falls Victory was built by Bethlehem Fairfield Shipyard. Her keel was laid on 1 February 1945. She was launched on 23 March and delivered on 17 April. Built for the WSA, she was operated under the management of United Fruit Company. Laid up in Suisun Bay in 1947. She was sold later that year to N.V. Vereenigde Nederlandsche Scheepvaarts Maatschappij, Den Haag, Netherlands and renamed Meerkerk. Sold in 1965 to China Union Lines, Keelung, Taiwan and renamed Keelung Victory. She was scrapped at Kaohsiung in 1985.

== Central Victory ==
Central Victory was built by Permanente Metals Corporation. Her keel was laid on 27 January 1945. She was launched on 10 March and delivered on 4 April. Built for the WSA, she was operated under the management of American-Hawaiian Steamship Company. Laid up at Mobile in 1948. returned to service due to the Vietnam War in 1966. Operated under the management of Weyerhaeuser Steamship Company. Laid up in Suisun Bay in 1970. She was scrapped in China in 1993.

== Chanute Victory ==
Chanute Victory was built by California Shipbuilding Corporation. Her keel was laid on 29 November 1944. She was launched on 19 January 1945 and delivered on 20 February. Built for the WSA, she was operated under the management of American-Hawaiian Steamship Company. Sold in 1947 to N.V. Van Nievelt, Goudriaan & Co., Rotterdam, Netherlands and renamed Alphacca. Sold in 1964 to China Merchants Steam Navigation Company, Keelung and renamed Hai-Fu. Sold in 1973 to Yang Ming Marine Transport Co., Taipei, Taiwan and renamed Kai Ming. Renamed Ming Cathay in 1977. She was scrapped at Kaohsiung in 1978.

== Chapel Hill Victory ==
Chapel Hill Victory was a troop transport built by Bethlehem Fairfield Shipyard. Her keel was laid on 9 October 1944. She was launched on 4 December and delivered on 31 December. Built for the WSA, she was operated under the management of Marine Transport Line. Sold in 1947 to N.V. Van Nievelt, Goudriaan & Co. and renamed Alwaki. Sold in 1964 to China Union Lines, Kaohsiung and renamed Kaohsiung Victory. She was scrapped at Kaohsiung in 1974.

== Chelsea Victory ==
Chelsea Victory was built by Oregon Shipbuilding Corporation. Her keel was laid on 29 May 1945. She was launched on 19 July and delivered on 14 August. Built for the WSA, she was operated under the management of Alaska Steamship Company. Sold in 1946 to Compana Argentina de Navigation Dodero, Buenos Aires, Argentina and renamed Granadero. Sold in 1949 to Flota Argentina de Navigation de Ultrama, Buenos Aires. Sold in 1961 to Empresa Lineas Maritimas Argentinas, Buenos Aires. She was scrapped at Campana, Argentina in 1975.

== China Victory ==
China Victory was built by California Shipbuilding Corporation. Her keel was laid on 28 November 1943. She was launched on 26 January 1944 and delivered on 1 April. Built for the WSA, she was operated under the management of Matson Navigation Company. Laid up at Astoria, Oregon in 1950, later transferred to Olympia, Washington. Sold in 1951 to Pope & Talbot, Inc., San Francisco and renamed P & T. Leader. Sold in 1962 to Sumner A. Long, New York and renamed Smith Leader. Sold in 1965 to Hudson Waterways Corporation, New York and renamed Transnorthern. Sold in 1969 to Buckeye Steamship Co., New York and renamed Buckeye Victory. She was scrapped at Kaohsiung in April 1972.

== Citadel Victory ==
Citadel Victory was built by Permanente Metals Corporation. Her keel was laid on 18 January 1945. She was launched on 28 February and delivered on 24 March. Built for the WSA, she was operated under the management of Waterman Steamship Corporation. Laid up at Wilmington, North Carolina in 1948. Later transferred to Beaumont. Sold for scrapping in 1992 and laid up at Port of Spain, Trinidad. She was scrapped at Port of Spain in 1996.

== Claremont Victory ==
Claremont Victory was built by Oregon Shipbuilding Corporation. Her keel was laid on 5 March 1944. She was launched on 2 May and delivered on 23 May. Built for the WSA, she was operated under the management of Isthmian Steamship Corp. Sold in 1946 to Compana Argentina de Navigation Dodero and renamed Hornero. Sold in 1949 to Flota Argentina de Navigation de Ultrama, Buenos Aires. Sold in 1961 to Empresa Lineas Maritimas Argentinas, Buenos Aires. Laid up at Buenos Aires in 1975. She was scrapped at Campana in 1978.

== Clark Victory ==
Clark Victory was built by Oregon Shipbuilding Corporation. Her keel was laid on 3 April 1945. She was launched on 15 May and delivered on 12 June. Built for the WSA, she was operated under the management of McCormick Steamship Company. Sold in 1946 to Compana Argentina de Navigation Dodero and renamed Tropero. On 16 September 1948, she rescued twenty survivors from the British Liberty ship Leicester, which was abandoned in the Atlantic Ocean. Sold in 1949 to Koninklijke Nederlandse Stoomboot-Maatschappij, Amsterdam, Netherlands and renamed Baarn. Sold in 1966 to Trade Lines Inc., Piraeus and renamed Trade Banner. Operated under the management of G. Callimanopulos. She was scrapped at Kaohsiung in June 1971.

== Clarksburg Victory ==
Clarksburg Victory was built by California Shipbuilding Corporation. Her keel was laid on 9 July 1945. She was launched on 15 September and delivered on 15 October. Built for the WSA, she was operated under the management of Olympic Steamship Company. Laid up at Mobile in 1946. She was returned to service in 1966 due to the Vietnam War. It was planned that she would be operated by the United States Navy as USS Clarksburg, but she operated in commercial service under charter. Laid up in Suisun Bay in 1970. She was scrapped at Kaohsiung in 1984.

== Clarksdale Victory ==
Clarksdale Victory was built by California Shipbuilding Corporation. Her keel was laid on 2 December 1944. She was launched on 27 January 1945 and delivered on 26 February. Built for the WSA, she was operated under the management of American President Lines. To the United States Army Transportation Corps in 1947. She was wrecked on the Hippa Reef, off Graham Island, Canada on 24 November 1947 whilst on a voyage from Whittier, Alaska to Seattle, Washington. She broke in two; the stern section sank. Four survivors were rescued from the bow section.

== Clarksville Victory ==
Clarksville Victory was built by Bethlehem Fairfield Shipyard. Her keel was laid on 30 November 1944. She was launched on 30 January 1945 and delivered on 26 February. Built for the WSA, she was operated under the management of American Export Line. Laid up at Wilmington, North Carolina in 1948. Later transferred to the James River. She was scrapped at Alang in 1994.

== Claymont Victory ==
Claymont Victory was a troop transport built by Bethlehem Fairfield Shipyard. Her keel was laid on 25 September 1944. She was launched on 18 November and delivered on 15 December. Built for the WSA, she was operated under the management of Eastern Steamship Co. Sold in 1947 to N.V.Vereenigde Nederlandsche Scheepvaarts Maatschappij and renamed Mariekerk. Sold in 1966 to Kavo Compania Navigation S.A., Monrovia, Liberia and renamed Kavo Longos. She was scrapped at Whampoa in August 1971.

== Clearfield ==
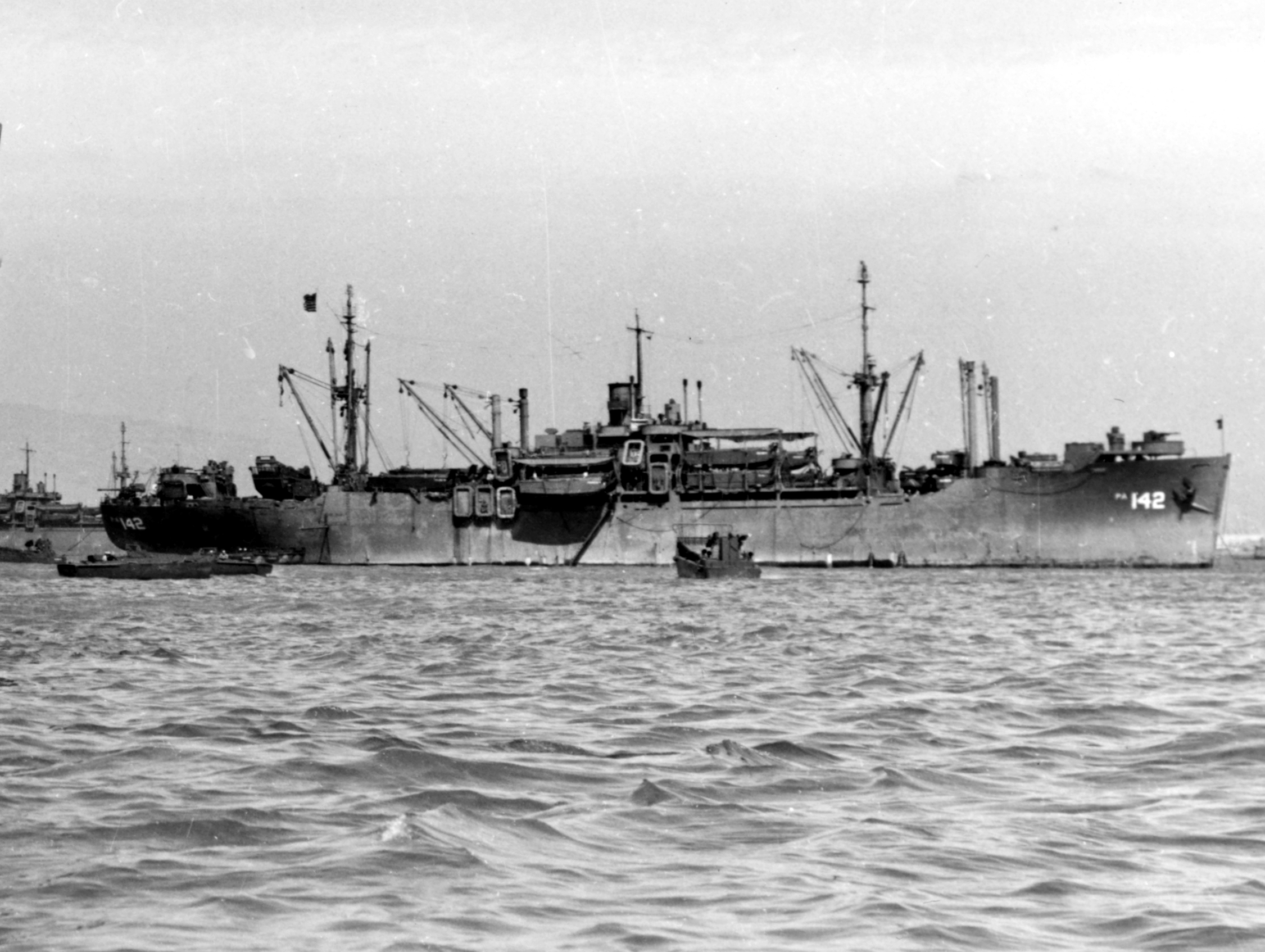
USS Clearfield

Clearfield was built by California Shipbuilding Corporation. Her keel was laid on 15 September 1944. She was launched on 21 November and delivered on 31 December. Built for the United States Navy. Laid up in the James River in 1946. She was sold to New York shipbreakers in April 1973.

== Clearwater Victory ==
Clearwater Victory was built by Permanente Metals Corporation. Her keel was laid on 1 December 1944. She was launched on 20 January 1945 and delivered on 16 February. Built for the WSA, she was operated under the management of Moore-McCormack Lines. Laid up at Mobile in 1949. She was returned to service in 1966 due to the Vietnam War. Operated under the management of Weyerhaeuser Steamship Company. Laid up in Suisun Bay in 1970. She was scrapped at Kaohsiung in 1985.

== Clermont ==
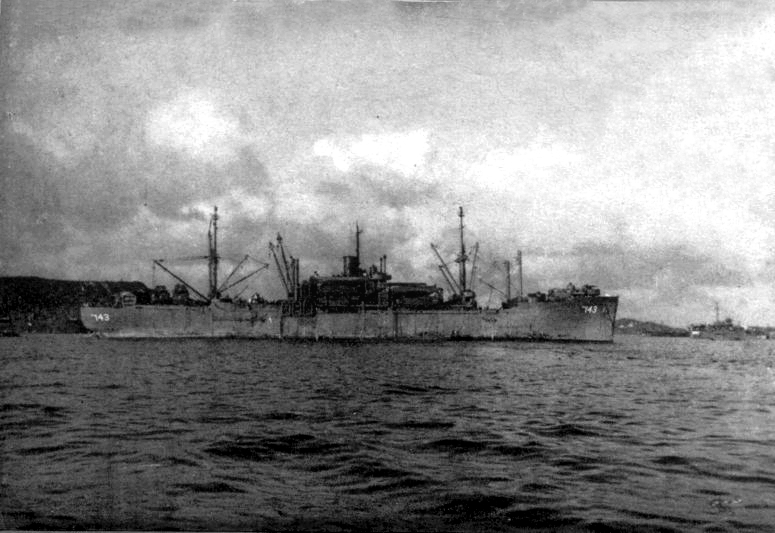
USS Clermont

Clermont was built by California Shipbuilding Corporation. Her keel was laid on 21 September 1944. She was launched on 25 November and delivered on 27 January 1945. Built for the United States Navy. Laid up in the James River in 1946. She was sold to New York shipbreakers in April 1973.

== Clinton ==
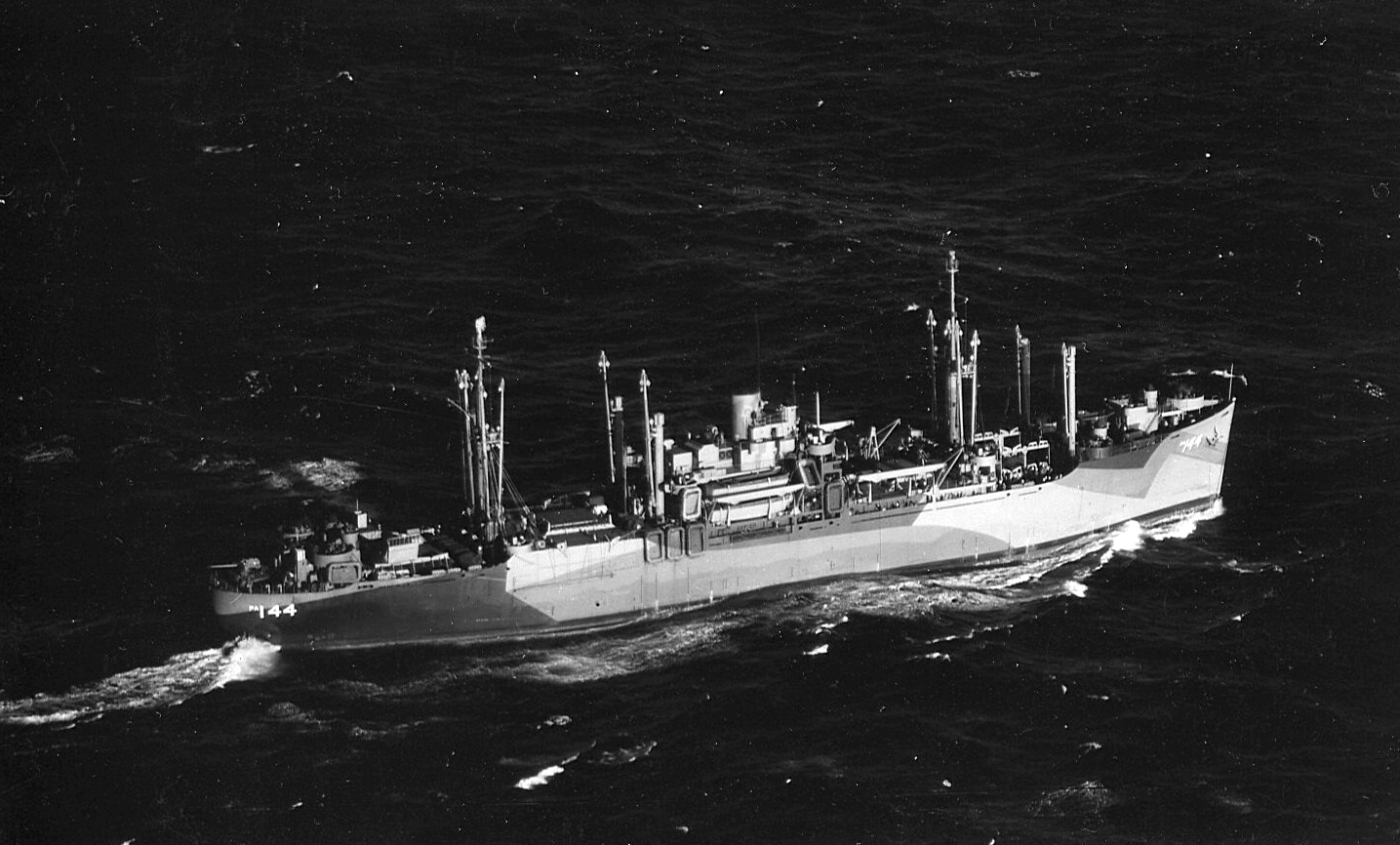
USS Clinton

Clinton was built by California Shipbuilding Corporation. Her keel was laid on 27 September 1944. She was launched on 29 November and delivered on 31 January 1945. Built for the United States Navy. To the United States Maritime Administration in 1959 and laid up in the James River. Returned to the United States Navy on 9 November 1983. Sunk as a target ship off the Virginia Capes on 1 August 1983.

== Clovis Victory ==
Clovis Victory was built by California Shipbuilding Corporation. Her keel was laid on 28 April 1944. She was launched on 8 July and delivered on 29 September. Built for the WSA, she was operated under the management of Seas Shipping Company. Laid up in Suisun Bay in 1948. Later transferred to Olympia. She was sold to American buyers in May 1972. Resold, she arrived at Kaohsiung for scrapping in August 1972.

== Coaldale Victory ==
Coaldale Victory was built by Bethlehem Fairfield Shipyard. Her keel was laid on 28 December 1944. She was launched on 23 February 1945 and delivered on 23 March. Built for the WSA, she was operated under the management of American Export Line. Laid up in the James River in 1946. Sold in 1948 to China Union Lines of Shanghai, China and Keelung, Taiwan; renamed Nanking Victory. Sold in 1951 to Fidelity Steamship Co., Panama and renamed Hassan. Sold in 1952 to Holland-Amerika Lijn, Rotterdam and renamed Appingedijk. Renamed Appingedyk in 1954. Sold in 1962 to Overseas Maritime Co., Monrovia and renamed Hongkong Mariner. She was scrapped at Kaohsiung in August 1972.

== Cody Victory ==
Cody Victory was built by California Shipbuilding Corporation. Her keel was laid on 26 October 1944. She was launched on 15 December and delivered on 22 January 1945. Built for the WSA, she was operated under the management of Alcoa Steamship Co. Laid up in the Hudson River in 1946. Sold in 1947 to Corporación Peruana de Vapores, Callao, Peru and renamed Yavari. Sold in 1968 to Gold Shipping, Callao. She caught fire at Los Angeles on 14 October 1968 whilst on a voyage from Iquique, Peru to Stockton, California and was consequently sold for scrapping. She departed on 13 March 1969 for a Taiwanese port, but sprang a leak on 21 March when 950 nautical miles (1,760 km) west of San Francisco. Salvage attempts had to be abandoned and she sank on 27 March 1,000 nautical miles (1,900 km) south west of San Francisco.

== Coe Victory ==
Coe Victory was built by Oregon Shipbuilding Corporation. Her keel was laid on 21 March 1945. She was launched on 3 May and delivered on 2 June. Built for the WSA, she was operated under the management of Black Diamond Steamship Company. Sold in 1949 to Victory Carriers Inc., New York. She was scrapped at Kaohsiung in August 1969.

== Coeur d'Alene Victory ==
Coeur d'Alene Victory was built by Oregon Shipbuilding Corporation. Her keel was laid on 12 November 1944. She was launched on 15 December and delivered on 12 January 1945. Built for the WSA, she was operated under the management of Weyerhaeuser Steamship Company. Sold in 1949 to Victory Carriers Inc., New York. She was scrapped at Kaohsiung in July 1969.

== Coffeyville Victory ==
Coffeyville Victory was built by Oregon Shipbuilding Corporation. Her keel was laid on 15 May 1945. She was launched on 5 July and delivered on 31 July. Built for the WSA, she was operated under the management of South Atlantic Steamship Lines. Sold in 1947 to Moore-McCormack Lines and renamed Mormacelm. She was scrapped at Hong Kong in April 1970.

== Colbert ==
Colbert was built by California Shipbuilding Corporation. Her keel was laid on 30 September 1944. She was launched on 1 December and delivered on 26 February 1945. Built for the United States Navy. To the United States Maritime Commission (USMC) in 1946 and laid up in Suisun Bay. She was scrapped in the United States in 1974.

== Colby Victory ==
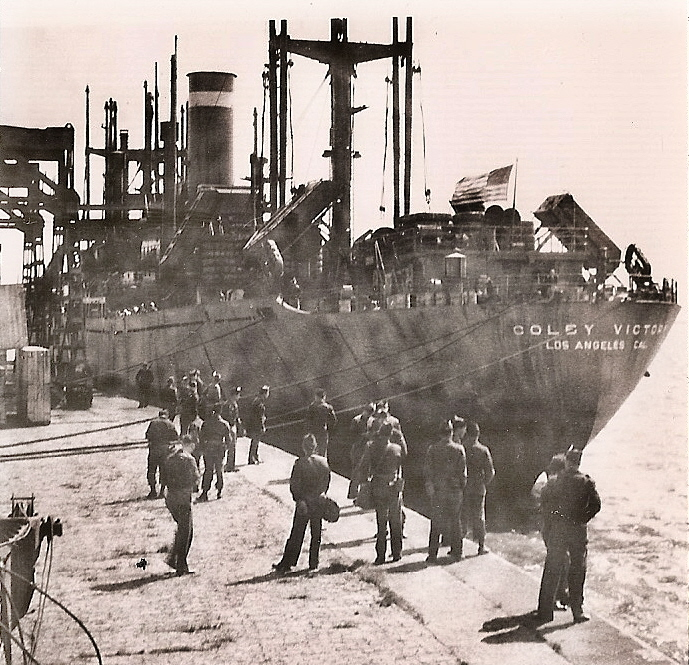
Colby Victory

Colby Victory was a troop transport built by California Shipbuilding Corporation. Her keel was laid on 19 December 1944. She was launched on 13 February 1945 and delivered on 12 March. Built for the WSA, she was operated under the management of United States Line. Sold in 1947 to Holland-Amerika Lijn and renamed Axeldijk. Renamed Axeldyk in 1954. Sold in 1963 to International Union Marine Corp., Monrovia and renamed Monique. Sold in 1965 to Pacific Coast Shipping Co., Monrovia. She was scrapped at Kaohsiung in February 1971.

== Colgate Victory ==
Colgate Victory was built by Oregon Shipbuilding Corporation. Her keel was laid on 9 January 1945. She was launched on 20 February and delivered on 31 March. Built for the WSA, she was operated under the management of Pacific-Atlantic Steamship Company. Sold in 1948 to Pacific Transport Lines, San Francisco and renamed Hong Kong Transport. Renamed Illinois in 1957. Sold in 1958 to States Steamship Co. To the United States Department of Commerce in 1961 and laid up. Sold in 1962 to West Coast Steamship Co., Portland, Oregon and renamed Oregon Victory. Sold in 1964 to Saxis Steamship Co., Wilmington, Delaware and renamed Ridgefield Victory. Sold in 1966 to Standard Steamship Co., Wilmington, Delaware. To the United States Maritime Administration in 1968 and laid up.She was scrapped at Bilbao, Spain in January 1969.

== Collingsworth ==
Collingsworth was built by California Shipbuilding Corporation. Her keel was laid on 6 October 1944. She was launched on 2 December and delivered on 26 February 1945. Built for the United States Navy. To the USMC in 1946 and laid up in the James River. She was scrapped in 1983.

== Colombia Victory ==
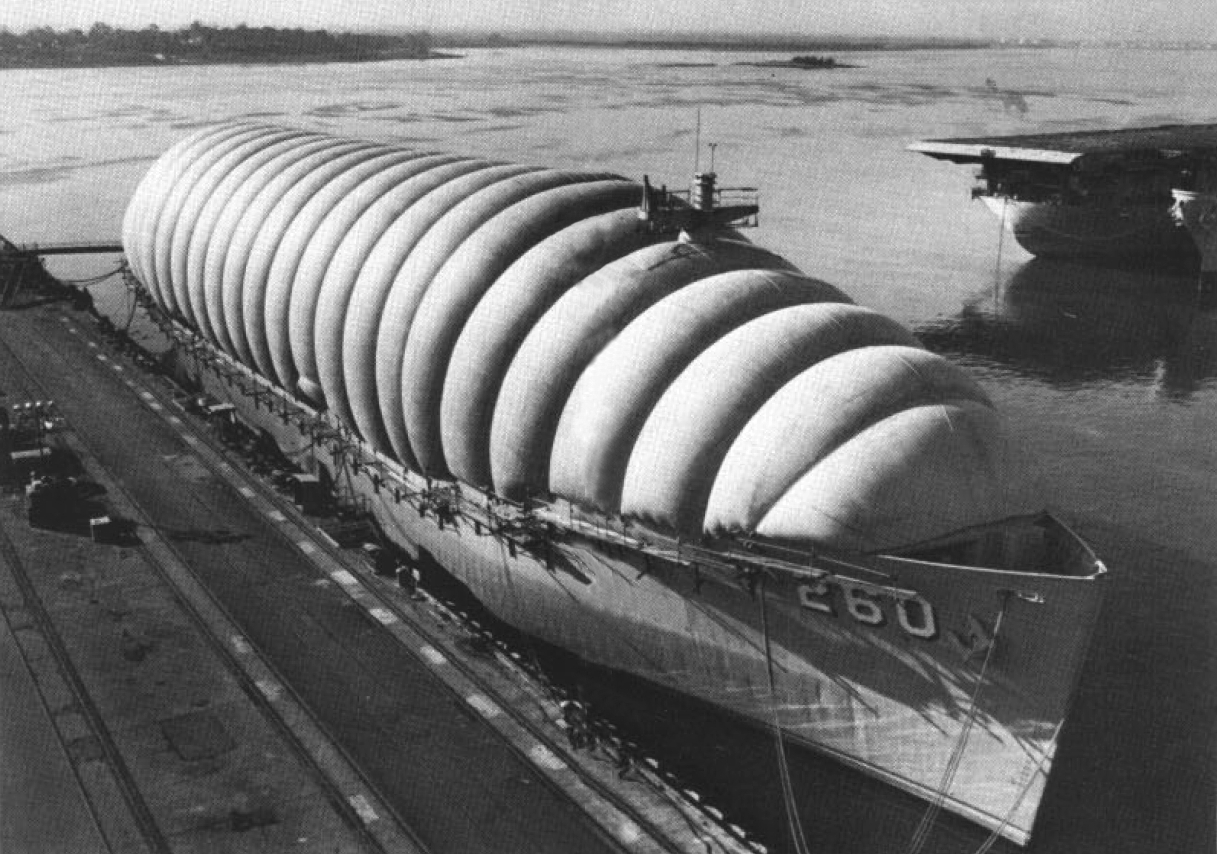
USS Betelgeuse mothballed at Philadelphia Navy Yard, 1971.

Colombia Victory was built by California Shipbuilding Corporation. Her keel was laid on 11 February 1944. She was launched on 10 April and delivered on 31 May. Built for the WSA, she was operated under the management of Isthmian Steamship Corporation, then Waterman Steamship Corporation, and later Grace Lines. Laid up at Wilmington, North Carolina in 1948. To the United States Navy in 1951 and renamed Betelgeuse. Decommissioned in January 1971. Laid up at Philadelphia. An experimental method of laying up was used, in which a nylon cover was filled with dehumidified air. She was sold for scrapping in December 1975. She ran aground off Cape Hatteras, North Carolina on 17 January 1976 whilst under tow to Brownsville for scrapping.

== Colorado Springs Victory ==
Colorado Springs Victory was built by Permanente Metals Corporation. Her keel was laid on 4 October 1944. She was launched on 2 December and delivered on 10 January 1945. Built for the WSA, she was operated under the management of Moore-McCormack Lines. Sold in 1946 to the Ministry of Transport, London, United Kingdom. Operated under the management of Canadian Pacific Steamships Ltd. Sold in 1947 to Silver Line, London and renamed Silvermaple. On 20 February 1951, she rescued 21 crew from the Norwegian Liberty ship Florentine, which sank in the Pacific Ocean. Sold in 1952 to I/S Sun Karen, Tønsberg, Norway and renamed Sun Karen. Operated under the joint management of Borges Rederi and D/S A/S Ardent. Lengthened by 30 feet (9.1 m) at Antwerp, Belgium in March 1953. Now 485 feet (147.83 m) long (overall), 8,141 GRT, 11,988 DWT. Sold in 1963 to Concord Navigation Corp. Ltd., Monrovia and renamed Concord. Transferred to Concord Navigation Corp Ltd., Keelung in 1968. She was sold for scrapping in 1970, arriving at Kaohsiung on 6 April. She was scrapped in December 1971.

== Cooper Union Victory ==
Cooper Union Victory was built by California Shipbuilding Corporation. Her keel was laid on 25 February 1945. She was launched on 19 April and delivered on 12 May. Built for the WSA, she was operated under the management of Seas Shipping Co. Laid up in the James River in 1947. Later transferred to Astoria. Sold in 1951 to Central Gulf Steamship Corp., Wilmington, Delaware. Lengthened by 90 feet (27 m) in February 1962 by Deutsche Werft, Hamburg, West Germany. Now 545 feet 6 inches (166.27 m) long, 9,465 GRT, 13,346 DWT. She was scrapped at Kaohsiung in October 1970.

== Cornell Victory ==
Cornell Victory was built by California Shipbuilding Corporation. Her keel was laid on 2 February 1945. She was launched on 30 March and delivered on 23 April. Built for the WSA, she was operated under the management of Waterman Steamship Co. Laid up in the James River in 1947. She was scrapped at Alang in 1994.

== Costa Rica Victory ==
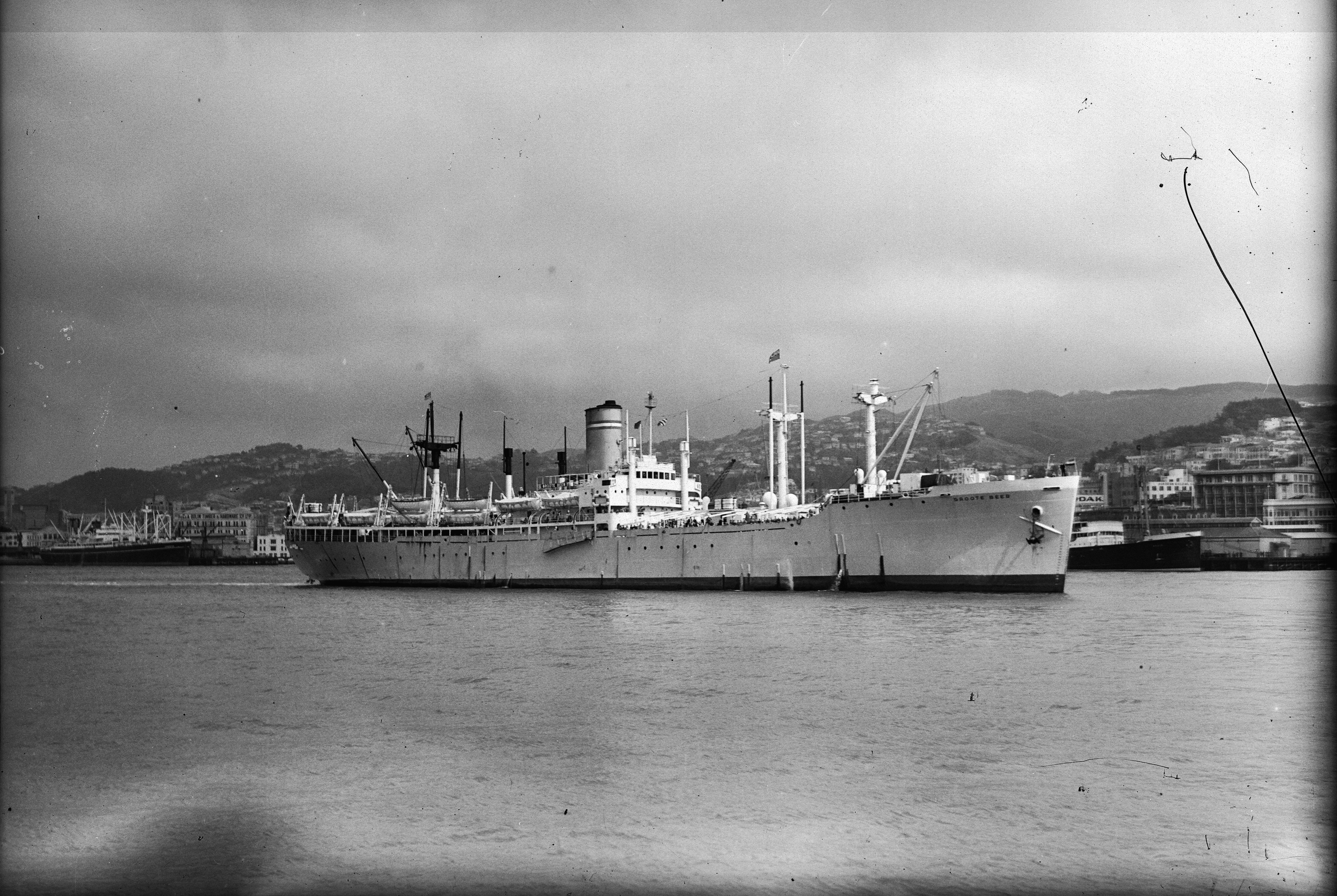
Groote Beer

Costa Rica Victory was a troopship built by Permanente Metals Corporation. Her keel was laid on 22 March 1944. She was launched on 17 June and delivered on 21 August. Built for the WSA, she was operated under the management of American-Hawaiian Steamship Co. Sold to the Dutch Government in 1947 and renamed Groote Beer. Operated under the management of Stoomvaart Maatschappij Nederland. Rebuilt as a passenger ship in Amsterdam in November 1951. Now 9,190 GRT. Placed under the management of Nederlandsche-Amerikaansche Stoomvaart Maatschappij N.V. Sold in 1960 to N.V. Scheepvaarts Maatschappij Transocean, remaining under the same management. Sold in December 1963 to John S. Latsis, Piraeus and renamed Marianna IV. Chartered to Nederlandsche-Amerikaansche Stoomvaart Maatschappij and renamed Groote Beer, remaining under the Greek flag. She collided with the British dredger Pen Avon off the Isle of Wight, United Kingdom on 12 July 1966 whilst on a voyage from Southampton to New York. Temporary repairs were made, but she was consequently laid up at Eleusis, Greece in March 1967 and was renamed Marianna IV. She was scrapped at Eleusis in June 1970.

== Cottle ==
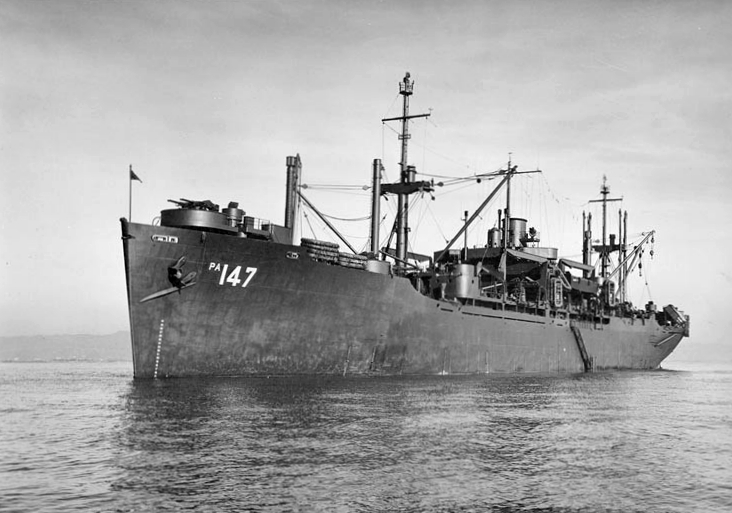
USS Cottle

Cottle was built by Kaiser Company, Vancouver, Washington. Her keel was laid on 15 October 1944 She was launched on 26 November delivered on 14 December. Built for the United States Navy. To the USMC in 1946 and laid up in the James River. She was sold to New York shipbreakers in April 1973.

== Council Bluffs Victory ==
Council Bluffs Victory was built by California Shipbuilding Corporation. Her keel was laid on 18 July 1945. She was launched on 27 September and delivered on 27 October. Built for the WSA, she was operated under the management of Moore-McCormack Lines. Laid up at Astoria in 1947. Returned to service in 1966 due to the Vietnam War. Operated under the management of States Steamship Co. Laid up in Suisun Bay in 1970. She was scrapped in China in 1994.

== Cranston Victory ==
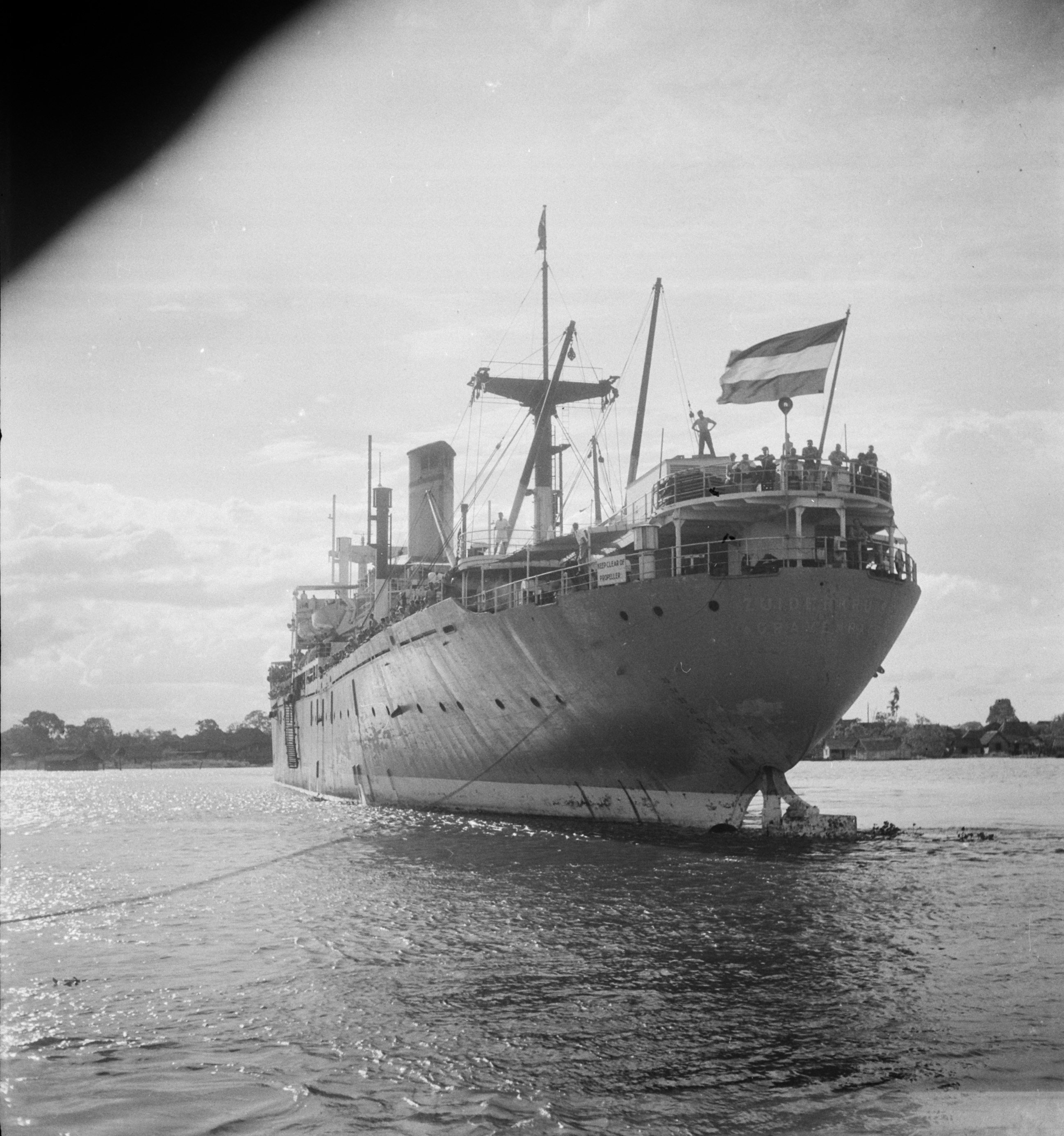
Zuiderkruis

Cranston Victory was a troopship built by Oregon Shipbuilding Corporation. Her keel was laid on 13 March 1944. She was launched on 5 May and delivered on 25 May. Built for the WSA, she was operated under the management of South Atlantic Steamship Lines. Laid up in the James River in 1946. Sold in 1947 to the Dutch Government and renamed Zuiderkruis. Operated under the management of Koninklijke Rotterdamsche Lloyd. Rebuilt as a passenger ship in 1951, now 9,178 GRT. Operated under the management of Stoomvaart Maatschappij Nederland. Sold in late 1960 to NV Scheepvaart Maatschappij Trans-Ocean. Refitted and now 9,376 GRT. To the Royal Netherlands Navy in 1963. Used as an accommodation ship at Den Helder. She arrived at Bilbao for scrapping on 27 November 1969.

== Creighton Victory ==
Creighton Victory was built by Oregon Shipbuilding Corporation. Her keel was laid on 6 February 1945. She was launched on 21 March and delivered on 17 April. Built for the WSA, she was operated under the management of United States Lines. Laid up at Wilmington, North Carolina in 1946. She was returned to service in 1966 due to the Vietnam War. Operated under the management of Alaska Steamship Co. Laid up in Suisun Bay in 1970. She was scrapped at Kaohsiung in 1984.

== Crockett ==
Crockett was built by Kaiser Company. Her keel was laid on 18 October 1944. She was launched on 28 November and delivered on 18 January 1945. Built for the United States Navy. Laid up in reserve in 1946. To the USMC in 1958 and laid up in the James River. She was scrapped in 1985.

== Cuba Victory ==
Cuba Victory was built by Permanente Metals Corporation. Her keel was laid on 31 March 1944. She was launched on 27 June and delivered on 19 August. Built for the WSA, she was operated under the management of Mississippi Shipping Co. Laid up at Beaumont in 1946. Returned to service in 1966 due to the Vietnam War. Shelled and severely damaged by Viet Cong forces at Cát Lái, Vietnam in 1968, she was laid up at Beaumont. She was scrapped at Brownsville in 1985.

== Czechoslovakia Victory ==
Czechoslovakia Victory was built by Oregon Shipbuilding Corporation. Her keel was laid on 25 November 1943. She was launched on 20 February 1944 and delivered on 11 March. Built for the WSA, she was operated under the management of American-Hawaiian Steamship Company. Laid up in the James River in 1946. To the United States Army Transportation Corps later that year and renamed Lt. James E. Robinson. To the United States Navy in 1950, operated by the Military Sea Transportation Service. To the United States Maritime Administration in 1963. Laid up in the James River in 1976. She was sold for scrapping in 1983.
