= Cornelis Bijvoet =

Dutch naval officer and ship's engineer

Cornelis Bijvoet (1890–1964) was a Dutch shipping engineer who served his country with distinction as a ship designer, a World War II naval officer and a senior technical advisor to the Dutch post-war shipping industry, overseeing the conversion of three troop ships to major immigrant ships.

== Early years ==
Bijvoet was born on 12 March 1890, to Cornelis Bijvoet, a basket maker, and Helena Christina Seiz in Alkmaar, Netherlands. He was the fifth of seven children.

On 31 March 1906 Bijvoet, aged 16, was awarded a certificate for completing a three-year course in blacksmithing at the Trade School for Alkmaar and surrounds ('De Ambachsschool voor Alkmaar en Omstreken'). The certificate states that he completed the course with good results ('met goed gevens heeft doorlopen'). When Bijvoet enlisted in compulsory national service in 1910, his occupation was listed as a bank worker.

== Career in shipping design ==
By 1937, Bijvoet was chief engineer at Stoomvaart Maatschappij Nederland (SMN) (The Netherlands Steamship Company, also known as the Netherland Line).

During that year, he was sent by the Director of SMN to Winterthur in Switzerland, to the Sulzer factory, where he supervised the building of the engines for the MS Oranje, a new passenger liner named in honour of the House of Oranje-Nassau. She would later be regarded as one of the "Big Three" or 'Grote Drie'. The Oranje, MS Willem Ruys and SS Nieuw Amsterdam, were all built from the same plan.

Bijvoet and his family lived in Zurich for a year while the engines for the Oranje were built. On their return to the Netherlands, the family was invited to Amsterdam for the launching of the Oranje by Queen Wilhelmina on 8 September 1938 as guests in the party of the Crown Princess Juliana and Prince Bernhard. During the ceremony, Queen Wilhelmina removed the last barrier that still held the Oranje on land but the ship did not move. It took another hour of work on the sliding struts until the Oranje finally was off the gantry. 'A real Oranje, it is being difficult!' the Queen is reported to have said.

In June 1939, Bijvoet and his family relocated to Scotland to prepare for the technical test rides of the Oranje at Abbs Head in the mouth of the Firth of Forth. Several trials earned the Oranje a top speed of 26.5 knots (49.1 km/h; 30.5 mph), 3 knots (5.6 km/h; 3.5 mph) faster than any other motor ship in the world. On 27 June 1939 the ship was delivered to the Netherland Line. Two trial voyages of ten day tourist cruises from Amsterdam to Madeira trialled the outfitting and organisation of the ship and her performance in all areas was regarded as outstanding.

== War service ==
With the outbreak of World War II on 3 September 1939, the Oranje was ordered to embark ahead of schedule on her maiden voyage to Sourabaya (Surabaya) on 4 September and await further orders. Bijvoet had been appointed Oranje's chief engineer under Captain Barend Adriaan Potjer. She sailed via Cape of Good Hope and Batavia. The Oranje was ordered to remain in Sourabaya for the safety of the ship and passengers and she remained there from her arrival in December 1939 until February 1941. The ship had been designed to be readily re-fitted as an armed merchant cruiser but she lay at anchor for all this time because of the lack of armament to do this.

In February 1941 Captain Potjer received orders to sail for Sydney and place his ship at the disposal of the Royal Australian Navy. The Dutch Government advised the Australian Government that they would fully outfit the Oranje as a hospital ship. The two governments agreed that she would sail under Australian command but the Oranje would retain her Dutch crew and continue to sail under the Dutch flag. In March 1941, she arrived in Sydney at Cockatoo Island dockyard, where she would be converted into a hospital ship.

In her new role as a hospital ship, the Oranje was painted white. A wide green band was painted around her hull with three Red Crosses on each side of the ship and her funnel, in an attempt to make it easier to identify her as a hospital ship. The Oranje departed Sydney on her first voyage on 30 July 1941, as the Royal Australian Navy's hospital ship. She was the largest hospital ship that operated from Australia and she served for five years throughout the South East Asian theatres of World War II.

In the five years she operated as an Australian hospital ship, the Oranje made 41 voyages transporting thousands of injured Australian, New Zealand and British soldiers as well as soldiers from other nations. Bijvoet and Captain Potjer remained on the Oranje for the duration of the war. Bijvoet returned home in June 1945. The Oranje itself did not return to Amsterdam until 1946.

== Post-war career ==
On his return from his uninterrupted, voluntary five-year tour of duty, Bijvoet retired from the merchant navy and was appointed technical advisor to the Ministry of Shipping. In this role he became superintendent of the newly acquired government ships SS Groote Beer, SS Waterman and SS Zuiderkruis, overseeing their conversion from US Victory troop carriers to immigrant ships. Beginning in 1951, the conversion of all three ships incorporated many innovative design features. An extra deck was added "and the bridge was moved on top and placed forward." Recognising that 'the current emigrant expects a decent quality', accommodation was a single tourist class, with the original large dormitories converted to cabins that accommodated five to eight people with washbasins with hot and cold water. There were also two dormitories for 55 solo passengers. The rooms were heated. The ships were also fitted out with hospital facilities, a cinema, laundries, a children's room, recreation room and a sports deck. Bijvoet drew up the plans, supervised and worked on the conversion and travelled widely to consult on the design.

Known as 'De Kleine Drie' (The Small Three), these ships transported thousands of Dutch emigrants departing the post war Netherlands for the opportunities presented in the US, Canada, Australia and New Zealand. Their conversion from very basic facilities as troop carriers to comfortable, efficient migrant ships earned Bijvoet appointment as an Officer of the Order of Oranje-Nassau by Queen Juliana in November 1951. The citation recognised his dedicated service as head of the Technical Service of the Ministry of Shipping. On the occasion of completion of the Waterman in November 1951, Mr. J. J. Oyevaar, Director General of Shipping, announced that Bijvoet had received the award for "his great merit for the conversion of the troop ships Zuiderkruis and Waterman into such excellent emigrant ships" ('zijn grote verdiensten door de verbouwing van de...Zuiderkruis en Waterman tot zulke voortreffelijk emigrantenschepen') that foreign trade journals "wrote about them with admiration" ('met bewondering over werd geschreven'.)

The Chancery of Dutch Royal Orders states that Officers of the Order of Oranje-Nassau "have generally rendered outstanding service of national or even international importance."

== Further career recognition ==
Four of Bijvoet's engine logbooks (for the years 1941, 1943 and 1944), maintained daily during his service as Chief Engineer on the Oranje, are now held in the Scheepvaart Museum, Amsterdam, regarded as a 'very valuable addition' to the museum's Oranje collection.

On 29 October 1946, the shipbuilders of the Oranje, the Sulzer Brothers, wrote to Bijvoet to thank him for his role in building the Oranje and honouring him with a plaque on board saying 'In recognition of your valuable contribution to the construction of the machine plant for the MS Oranje and for your valuable collaboration during the building of the MS Oranje.'

On 24 April 1950 Bijvoet was awarded the Dutch War Commemorative Cross with two buckles for:

- War service in the Merchant Navy 1940–1945
- East Asia – South Pacific 1942–1945

== Personal life ==
Bijvoet married Grietje Jacoba Korff (1890–1974) on 16 December 1912 in Weesp. They had two children, Cornelis Jan (1918–2012) and Nanny Helena (1920–2020). Bijvoet died in Breda on 16 November 1964.
