= Howard Coffin =

Howard Coffin may refer to:

- Howard A. Coffin (1877–1956), Michigan politician
- Howard E. Coffin (1873–1937), automobile and aircraft engineer and industrialist
  - SS Howard E. Coffin, a Liberty ship
