= SS Virginia Dare =

World War II Liberty ship of the United States

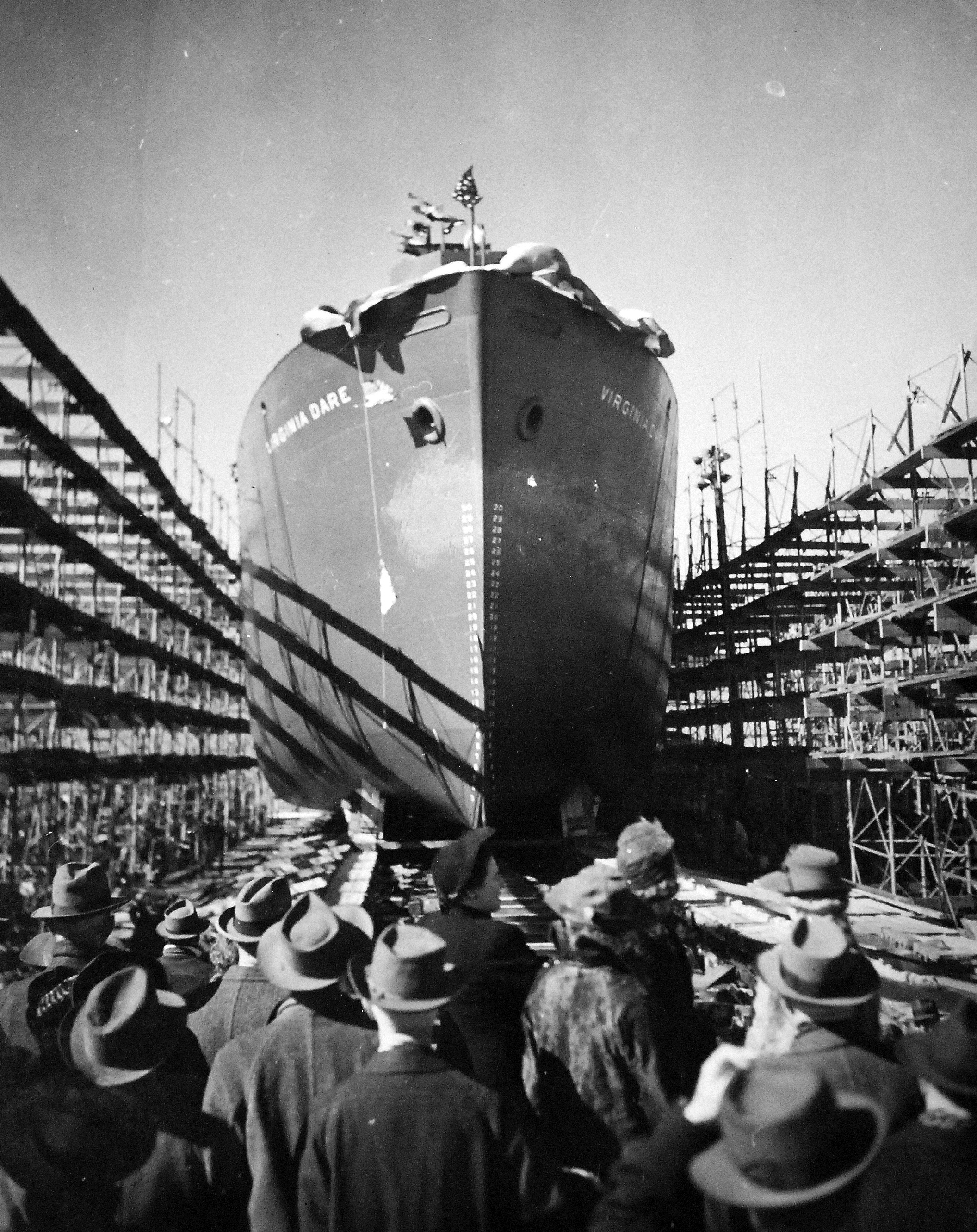
- SS Virginia Dare launched at Wilmington, North Carolina, February 3, 1942

History

United States
- Name: Virginia Dare
- Namesake: Virginia Dare
- Builder: North Carolina Shipbuilding Company, Wilmington, North Carolina
- Yard number: 3
- Way number: 3
- Laid down: 28 May 1941
- Launched: 3 February 1942
- Acquired: 27 March 1942
- Out of service: 6 March 1944
- Honors and awards: 1 × battle star
- Fate: Scrapped 1948

General characteristics
- Type: Liberty ship
- Tonnage: 7,000 long tons deadweight (DWT)
- Length: 441 ft 6 in (134.57 m)
- Beam: 56 ft 11 in (17.35 m)
- Draft: 27 ft 9 in (8.46 m)
- Propulsion: Two oil-fired boilers; Triple expansion steam engine; Single screw; 2,500 hp (1,864 kW)
- Speed: 11 knots (20 km/h; 13 mph)
- Capacity: 9,140 tons cargo
- Complement: 41
- Armament: 1 × Stern-mounted 4 in (100 mm) deck gun; AA guns

SS Virginia Dare (MC contract 147) was a Liberty ship built in the United States during World War II. She was named after Virginia Dare, the first English child born in America, who disappeared along with the rest of the Roanoke Colony.

The ship was laid down by North Carolina Shipbuilding Company in their Cape Fear River yard on 28 May 1941, then launched on 3 February 1942. She was operated by the South Atlantic Steamship Line for the War Shipping Administration. Virginia Dare was operated by South Atlantic Steamship Lines under charter with the Maritime Commission and War Shipping Administration. In September 1942 Greene was part of the heavily escorted Arctic Convoy PQ 18 when her crew was credited with shooting down seven German aircraft and received the Gallant Ship Citation.

While operating off of Bizerte, Tunisia she struck a mine and had to be beached. Seven days later she broke in half. In 1948 she was scrapped by an Italian salvage company.

== Awards ==
- Virginia Dare's Naval Armed Guard detachment received one battle star for World War II service in Murmansk convoy operations.
- Captain Arthur L. Johnson, Master of Virginia Dare was given the Merchant Marine Distinguished Service Medal by The President of the United States. He was awarded for leadership and high courage in the face of attacking planes. The award was given by Admiral Emory S. Land.
