= USS Marengo =

Cargo ship of the United States Navy

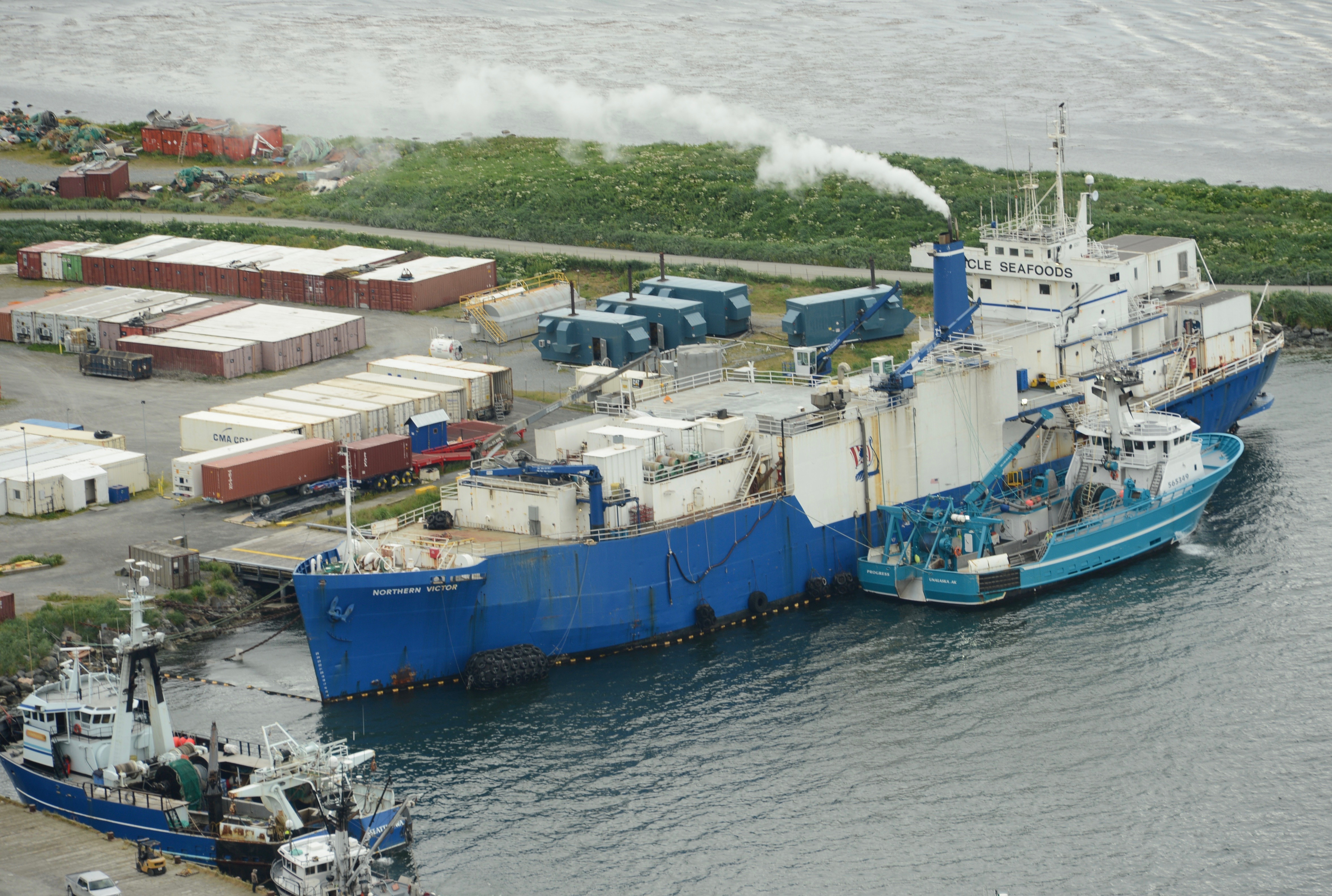
- Fish factory Northern Victor

History

United States
- Name: Coastal Spartan (1944–1945); Marengo (1945)
- Namesake: Marengo County, Alabama
- Ordered: as type (C1-M-AV1) hull, MC hull 2125
- Builder: Walter Butler Shipbuilders, Inc., Superior, Wisconsin
- Yard number: 43
- Laid down: 4 July 1944
- Launched: 4 December 1944
- Acquired: 24 August 1945
- Commissioned: 21 September 1945
- Decommissioned: 23 November 1945
- Identification: Hull symbol: AK-194; Code letters: NEOG
- Fate: Returned to Maritime Commission, 23 November 1945

United States
- Name: Coastal Spartan
- Owner: Maritime Commission
- Operator: North Atlantic & Gulf SS Company (1945–1946); South Atlantic SS Line (1948)
- Acquired: 23 November 1945
- In service: 23 November 1945
- Out of service: 22 April 1948
- Fate: Sold, 19 July 1965
- Notes: sold for non-transportation use

United States
- Name: Coastal Spartan
- Owner: Boston Metals, Company
- Acquired: 19 July 1965
- Fate: Sold

United States
- Name: Cyclone (1971–1975); Ocean Cyclone (1975–1989)
- Owner: Storm Drilling Company
- In service: December 1971
- Refit: converted to drilling ship, December 1971; converted to crane ship, 1975
- Fate: Sold late 1989

United States
- Name: Northern Victor
- Owner: Seafoods Wholesalers, Inc.
- Acquired: 1989
- In service: 19 October 1990
- Out of service: 1999
- Refit: converted to fish processing vessel, 1989–1990
- Fate: Sold

United States
- Name: Northern Victor
- Owner: Icicle Seafoods Inc.
- Acquired: 1999
- Identification: IMO number: 7208431; MMSI number: 366987710; Callsign: WCZ6534
- Status: Active

General characteristics
- Class & type: Alamosa-class cargo ship
- Type: C1-M-AV1
- Tonnage: 5,032 long tons deadweight (DWT)
- Displacement: 2,382 long tons (2,420 t) (standard); 7,450 long tons (7,570 t) (full load)
- Length: 388 ft 8 in (118.47 m)
- Beam: 50 ft (15 m)
- Draft: 21 ft 1 in (6.43 m)
- Installed power: 1 × Nordberg, TSM 6 diesel engine; 1,750 shp (1,300 kW)
- Propulsion: 1 × propeller
- Speed: 11.5 kn (21.3 km/h; 13.2 mph)
- Capacity: 3,945 t (3,883 long tons) DWT; 9,830 cu ft (278 m^{3}) (refrigerated); 227,730 cu ft (6,449 m^{3}) (non-refrigerated)
- Complement: 15 Officers; 70 Enlisted
- Armament: 1 × 3 in (76 mm)/50-caliber dual-purpose gun (DP); 6 × 20 mm (0.8 in) Oerlikon anti-aircraft (AA) cannons

USS Marengo (AK-194) was an Alamosa-class cargo ship that was constructed by the US Navy during the closing period of World War II. She was declared excess-to-needs and returned to the US Maritime Commission shortly after commissioning.

== Construction ==
Marengo (AK 194) was laid down under a Maritime Commission contract, MC hull 2125, by Walter Butler Shipbuilders Inc., Superior, Wisconsin, 4 July 1944; launched 4 December 1944; sponsored by Mrs. R. W. Higgins; acquired by the Navy at New Orleans, Louisiana, 24 August 1945; placed in service the same day she was acquired, and was used for ferrying from Beaumont, Texas, to Galveston, Texas. She was placed out of service on arrival the 29 August; and commissioned 21 September.

== Post-war decommissioning ==
The end of World War Il reduced the need for cargo ships, so Marengo decommissioned 23 November and was transferred to War Shipping Administration (WSA) the same day. The ship was subsequently operated by North Atlantic & Gulf Steamship Co., under the name Coastal Spartan.

== Merchant service ==
Coastal Spartan was contracted to North Atlantic & Gulf SS Company and South Atlantic SS Line until being laid up in the reserve fleet in Wilmington, North Carolina, on 22 April 1948.

She was sold to Boston Metals, Company, on 19 July 1965, for non-transportation use.

In December 1971, she was sold to Storm Drilling Company, and converted to a drilling ship. She was renamed Cyclone on 30 December 1971. She was again converted in 1975, to a crane ship and renamed Ocean Cyclone.

She was sold in 1989, converted by the Eastern Shipbuilding Company, Panama City, Florida, to a fish processing vessel in 1989–1990.

In late 1999, she was acquired by Icicle Seafoods, Inc.

Since 2018, it works as a fish factory, permanently moored at Dutch Harbor, Alaska . In 2022, it was bought by Westward Seafoods Inc. .

== Notes ==
Citations

== Bibliography ==
Online resources

- "Marengo". Dictionary of American Naval Fighting Ships. Naval History and Heritage Command. This article incorporates text from this source, which is in the public domain.
- "C1 Cargo Ships". www.ShipbuildingHistory.com. 28 August 2009.
- "USS Marengo (AK-194)". NavSource. 17 July 2015.
- "Coastal Spartan". United States Department of Transportation. Archived from the original on November 4, 2016.
- "Northern Victor's New Home In Unalaska May Help Processor Expand Operations". KUCB TV.
- "New owner to take over Unalaska fish processing plant". KUCB TV.
