= SS Henry Bacon =

World War II Liberty ship of the United States

History

United States
- Name: Henry Bacon
- Namesake: Henry Bacon
- Operator: South Atlantic Steamship Company.
- Ordered: 17 January 1942
- Laid down: 29 September 1942
- Launched: 11 November 1942
- Commissioned: 24 November 1942
- Fate: Sunk by aircraft torpedo in the Barents Sea, 23 February 1945

General characteristics
- Class & type: EC2-S-C1 Liberty ship
- Displacement: 14,245 tons (3,380 light ship)
- Length: 441 ft 6 in (134.57 m)
- Beam: 57 ft (17 m)
- Draft: 26 ft 10 in (8.18 m)
- Propulsion: 2,500 hp (1,900 kW) 3 cyl Triple-expansion reciprocating steam engine
- Speed: 11 knots (20 km/h)
- Range: 23,000 miles (37,000 km)
- Capacity: 562,608 cu ft (15,931.3 m^{3}) grain
- Complement: 8 USMM officers, 30 USMM seamen, 1 USNAG officer, 24 USNAG seamen
- Armament: 20 mm Oerlikon machine guns, 1 × 3.5 in (89 mm) bow gun, 1 × 5.38 in (137 mm) stern gun

The Liberty ship SS Henry Bacon was the last allied ship sunk by the Luftwaffe in World War II. Twenty two crew members and seven members of the United States Navy Armed Guard lost their lives in this action. The vessel was named after Henry Bacon, the American architect who designed and built many monuments and settings for public sculpture, including the Lincoln Memorial in Washington, D.C.

== World War II ==
The Henry Bacon was one of the thirty-eight merchant ships in convoy RA 64, which departed Kola Inlet, Murmansk, North Russia bound for Loch Ewe, Gourock, Scotland on Friday, 17 February 1945. The crew complement under Captain Alfred Carini was forty-one merchant seamen and twenty-six US Navy Armed Guard. The Henry Bacon was in ballast and carrying nineteen Norwegian civilian refugees, including women and children, as passengers.

Before the convoy set sail, news had been received of a German attack on Norwegian patriots living on the island of Sørøya, in the approaches to the former German naval anchorage at Altafjord. The British Royal Navy had sent four destroyers to the scene and had rescued 500 men, women and children. These refugees were distributed among the ships of the convoy for passage to England.

On the afternoon of the Saturday, 18 February, the weather deteriorated to force 8 on the Beaufort scale, and the escort carriers were unable to operate aircraft. That night the storm intensified with winds gusting up to sixty knots (110 km/h) with a heavy sea and swell. The convoy split up and began to disperse. The storm continued through Sunday, 19 February.

On 20 February, the storm abated and the escort vessels started to round up the scattered ships. At 4 am the convoy had been detected by aircraft, and by 9 am twenty-nine of the ships were back on station with four still straggling.

Then, on 22 February, the convoy ran into one of the worst storms ever recorded in the Barents Sea. Once again the convoy began to split up and was blown apart. The weather deteriorated to Beaufort scale force 12 with winds at 70 to 90 knots and temperatures 40 below zero. During this storm, one of the main springs on the Henry Bacon's steering gear was broken, and the retaining pin was sheared. This damage caused the Henry Bacon to drop out of the convoy to effect repairs.

== Fate ==
Around 1500 GCT on 23 February 1945, the Henry Bacon was some 50 to 60 nautical miles astern of the main convoy when she was attacked by twenty-three Junkers Ju 88 and Ju 188's torpedo bombers of Luftwaffe Group KG26, out of Bardufoss, Norway, some 250 miles (400 km) away. The Germans were on their way to attack the main convoy, and thought they could finish the lone straggler easily. The Henry Bacon was armed with eight 20 mm anti-aircraft guns, with a 5-inch (127 mm) gun aft and a 3 in (76 mm) gun forward. The ship's Naval Armed Guard gunners fought the attacking planes for over an hour, shot down five planes, damaged at least four others and managed to defend against several torpedoes by causing their detonation before they reached the ship.

At 1520 GCT, one torpedo struck the starboard side of the No.5 hold, and detonated the aft ammunition magazine. A large hole was torn in the hull. The rudder, propeller and steering engine were destroyed. The ship settled by the stern and sank within an hour. This action helped save the main convoy, as most of the German planes were forced to return to base owing to battle damage, low fuel, and low ammunition.

The Henry Bacon was abandoned at 1600 GCT at 67.38N 05.00E. Lifeboats No. 1 and No. 2 were launched safely. The No. 3 boat capsized while being lowered, and because the davits to the No. 4 boat had been damaged in the storm, this boat was also lost. Three of the four life rafts had been released prematurely and had drifted away. The two surviving lifeboats were filled to capacity with all of the Norwegian passengers and some members of the crew.

This left a number of crew members stranded aboard the Henry Bacon. When this situation became known to Chief Engineer Donald Haviland, he insisted that he would give his place in the lifeboat to a younger crew member and died with the ship. That crew member's name was Robert Tatosky. For his sacrifice, Chief Engineer Haviland was awarded the Distinguished Service Medal, the highest award for the men of the Merchant Marine.

The Bosun, Holcomb Lammon, collected dunnage from the deck and lashed it into a makeshift life-raft. Six Armed Guard and five merchant crew owe their lives to this raft. Lammon also died with the ship, and he was awarded the Meritorious Service Medal.

== Aftermath ==
The survivors were rescued by crew members from three British destroyers, HMS Zambesi, HMS Opportune and HMS Zelast. By this time the men in the water were so cold they were unable to help themselves, so the British sailors had to jump into the freezing sea with ropes tied around their waists to help them. When it was over, all of the Norwegian civilians had survived, nine Naval Armed Guard gunners, and two Navy signalmen were lost at sea. Captain Carini and fifteen fellow Merchant Marine crewmen were also lost. In 1946, Captain Carini was posthumously awarded the Krigskorset med Sverd or Norwegian War Cross with Sword. This is Norway's highest military award for gallantry and he is one of only two Americans, and 126 foreigners to have received this award.

Some of the surviving crew members from the Henry Bacon were taken first to Iceland and then to Scapa Flow. There, King Haakon VII of Norway presented them with the Norwegian War Medal, but not before they were interrogated as suspected German spies who had been planted in the water later, since no one believed that anybody could have survived two hours in the freezing waters. After being found innocent, the survivors returned to the United States on the USS Wakefield, where they arrived at Newport News, Virginia, on 20 March 1945.

The Royal Norwegian Embassy in Washington, DC now sponsors the annual "SS Henry Bacon Memorial Lecture" on 23 February 2003, the anniversary of the ship's sinking.
