= SS Edwin G. Weed =

Liberty ship of WWII

History

United States
- Name: Edwin G. Weed
- Namesake: Edwin G. Weed
- Owner: War Shipping Administration (WSA)
- Operator: South Atlantic Steamship Lines, Inc.
- Ordered: as type (EC2-S-C1) hull, MC hull 1221
- Builder: St. Johns River Shipbuilding Company, Jacksonville, Florida
- Cost: $1,405,336
- Yard number: 29
- Way number: 5
- Laid down: 7 December 1943
- Launched: 29 January 1944
- Sponsored by: Miss Margaret G. Weed
- Completed: 11 February 1944
- Identification: Call sign: KVQO
- Fate: Laid up in the, Hudson River Reserve Fleet, Jones Point, New York, 27 May 1946; Sold to Italy, 27 December 1946, removed from fleet, 3 January 1947

Italy
- Name: Eugenio C.
- Owner: Giacomo Costa fu Andrea
- Fate: Sold, 1963

Liberia
- Name: Aris
- Owner: Transatlantic Transport Corp
- Fate: Scrapped, 1967

General characteristics
- Class & type: Liberty ship; type EC2-S-C1, standard
- Tonnage: 10,865 LT DWT; 7,176 GRT
- Displacement: 3,380 long tons (3,434 t) (light); 14,245 long tons (14,474 t) (max)
- Length: 441 feet 6 inches (135 m) oa; 416 feet (127 m) pp; 427 feet (130 m) lwl
- Beam: 57 feet (17 m)
- Draft: 27 ft 9.25 in (8.4646 m)
- Installed power: 2 × Oil fired 450 °F (232 °C) boilers, operating at 220 psi (1,500 kPa); 2,500 hp (1,900 kW)
- Propulsion: 1 × triple-expansion steam engine, (manufactured by Filer and Stowell, Milwaukee, Wisconsin); 1 × screw propeller
- Speed: 11.5 knots (21.3 km/h; 13.2 mph)
- Capacity: 562,608 cubic feet (15,931 m^{3}) (grain); 499,573 cubic feet (14,146 m^{3}) (bale)
- Complement: 38–62 USMM; 21–40 USNAG
- Armament: Varied by ship; Bow-mounted 3-inch (76 mm)/50-caliber gun; Stern-mounted 4-inch (102 mm)/50-caliber gun; 2–8 × single 20-millimeter (0.79 in) Oerlikon anti-aircraft (AA) cannons and/or, 2–8 × 37-millimeter (1.46 in) M1 AA guns

SS Edwin G. Weed was a Liberty ship built in the United States during World War II. She was named after Edwin G. Weed, the third bishop of Florida in the Episcopal Church.

== Construction ==
Edwin G. Weed was laid down on 7 December 1943, under a Maritime Commission (MARCOM) contract, MC hull 1221, by the St. Johns River Shipbuilding Company, Jacksonville, Florida; she was sponsored by Miss Margaret G. Weed, the sister of the namesake, and was launched on 29 January 1944.

== History ==
She was allocated to the South Atlantic Steamship Lines, on 11 February 1944. On 27 May 1946, she was laid up in the Hudson River Reserve Fleet, Jones Point, New York. She was sold, 27 December 1946, to Italy, for $544,506, for commercial use. She was removed from the fleet on 3 January 1947. Edwin G. Weed was renamed Eugenio C. in 1947. In 1963, she was sold and named Aris and reflagged for Liberia. She was scrapped in 1967.

== Bibliography ==
- "St. John's River Shipbuilding, Jacksonville FL". www.ShipbuildingHistory.com. 16 October 2010.
- Maritime Administration. "Edwin G. Weed". Ship History Database Vessel Status Card. U.S. Department of Transportation, Maritime Administration.
- Davies, James (May 2004). "Specifications (As-Built)" (PDF). p. 23.
- "SS Edwin G. Weed".
