= USS Dickens =

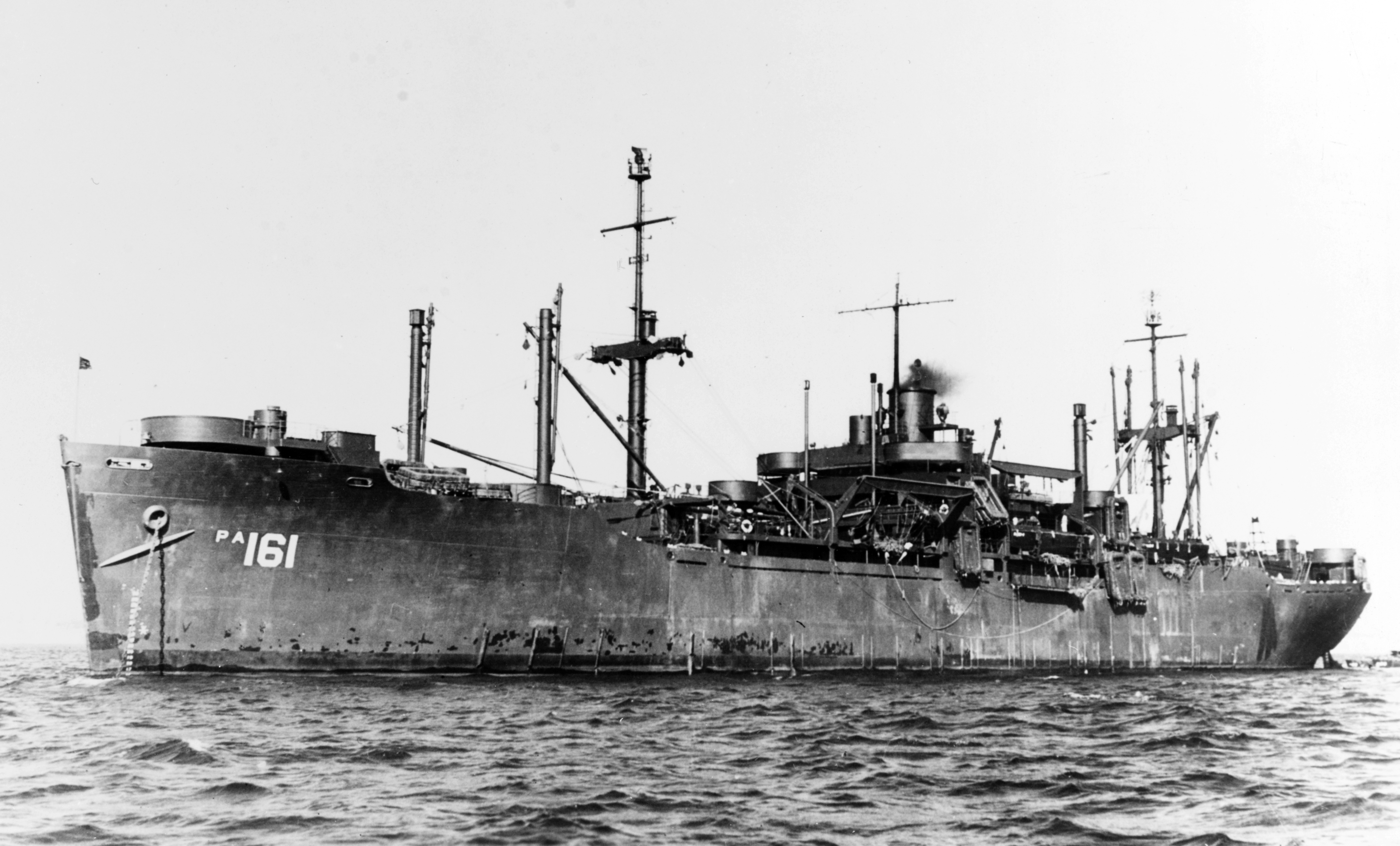

History

United States
- Name: USS Dickens
- Namesake: Dickens County, Texas
- Builder: Oregon Shipbuilding
- Launched: 8 September 1944
- Commissioned: 18 October 1944
- Decommissioned: 21 May 1946
- Honors and awards: 2 Battle stars
- Fate: Scrapped 1974

General characteristics
- Displacement: 6,873 tons
- Length: 455 ft (139 m)
- Beam: 62 ft (19 m)
- Draft: 24 ft (7.3 m)
- Propulsion: Oil Fired Steam Turbine; 1 Shaft
- Speed: 17 knots
- Boats & landing craft carried: 26
- Complement: 56 Officers, 480 Enlisted
- Armament: 1 5"/38 gun; 1 40 mm quad mount; 4 40 mm twin mounts; 10 20 mm single mounts

USS Dickens (APA-161) was a Haskell-class attack transport in service with the United States Navy from 1944 to 1946. She was scrapped in 1974.

== History ==
Dickens was a Victory ship design, VC2-S-AP5 and was named after Dickens County, Texas, United States. She was launched 8 September 1944 by Oregon Shipbuilding Corp., Portland, Oregon, under a United States Maritime Commission contract; sponsored by Mrs. A. M. Owens; transferred to the Navy 18 October 1944; and commissioned the same day.

=== World War II ===
Dickens arrived at Pearl Harbor 11 December 1944 with an unusual cargo, $150 million worth of occupation script [sic.] for use later in the war. From 11 December to 27 January 1945 she conducted amphibious training operations with elements of the 5th Marines, then sailed by way of Eniwetok and Saipan, to Iwo Jima for the initial assault landings 19 February. She remained off Green Beach under famed Mount Suribachi until 25 February when she sailed for Saipan carrying casualties and 455 survivors of USS Bismarck Sea (CVE-95).

After her landing craft were replaced at Tulagi, Dickens rehearsed at Espiritu Santo, then sailed from Ulithi 4 April 1945 for support landings on Okinawa between 9 and 14 April. Returning to Saipan with casualties 18 April, she embarked reinforcements at Guam and landed them on Okinawa from 15 to 19 May, again returning to Saipan with casualties and troops relieved of duty at Okinawa. On 1 June, Dickens entered Subic Bay where she joined in amphibious training until the cessation of hostilities.

On 25 August 1945 Dickens sailed for Japan with Occupation troops whom she landed at Tokyo Bay 2 September. She returned to the Philippines until 20 October when she stood out for Seattle, arriving 9 November. She was assigned to "Magic Carpet" duty and made one voyage to Tacloban, Philippine Islands, and one to Pearl Harbor, to bring home returning veterans until 4 March when she sailed for the east coast. Arriving at Norfolk 23 March, Dickens was decommissioned there 21 May 1946 and returned to the Maritime Commission the same day.

=== Decommissioning and fate ===
Ex-Dickens was placed in the National Defense Reserve Fleet in James River, Virginia. Between 22 July and 14 October 1955 she was withdrawn from the Reserve Fleet for a Repair Program, GAA- South Atlantic Steamship Company, and returned. Ex-Dickens was sold for $310,989 to Luria Brothers & Co., Inc. for scrapping on 7 May 1974. At 1300 EDT, on 18 June 1974 she was withdrawn from the Reserve Fleet and sent to the breaker's yard.

== Awards ==
Dickens received two battle stars for World War II service.
