= SS Richard Caswell =

World War II Liberty ship of the United States

History

United States
- Name: Richard Caswell
- Namesake: Richard Caswell
- Builder: North Carolina Shipbuilding Company, Wilmington, North Carolina
- Yard number: 48
- Way number: 3
- Laid down: 6 November 1942
- Launched: 10 December 1942
- Fate: Sunk by U-513, 16 July 1943

General characteristics
- Type: Liberty ship
- Tonnage: 7,000 long tons deadweight (DWT)
- Length: 441 ft 6 in (134.57 m)
- Beam: 56 ft 11 in (17.35 m)
- Draft: 27 ft 9 in (8.46 m)
- Propulsion: Two oil-fired boilers; Triple expansion steam engine; Single screw; 2,500 hp (1,864 kW)
- Speed: 11 knots (20 km/h; 13 mph)
- Capacity: 9,140 tons cargo
- Complement: 69
- Armament: 1 × Stern-mounted 4 in (100 mm) deck gun; 9 x 20mm AA guns

SS Richard Caswell (MC contract 870) was a Liberty ship built in the United States during World War II. She was named after Richard Caswell, the first Governor of North Carolina, member of the Continental Congress, militia officer in the War of the Regulation and the American Revolutionary War. She was operated by the South Atlantic Steamship Company under charter with the Maritime Commission and War Shipping Administration.

The ship was laid down by North Carolina Shipbuilding Company in their Cape Fear River yard on November 6, 1942, and launched on December 10, 1942.

== Loss ==
On July 16, 1943, while sailing unescorted the Caswell was torpedoed by the German submarine U-513. The first torpedo struck aft of the engine room and killed three men on watch. Most of the crew abandoned ship but the Master and a party stayed aboard. A second torpedo struck the vessel ten minutes later. Fifteen minutes after that, the Caswell broke in half and sank. Three officers and six sailors were killed. Survivors were rescued by the USS Barnaget on July 22, 1943.

As a result of this action, Chief Engineer Harold Van Rensselear Forrest received the Merchant Marine Meritorious Service Medal for his efforts to rescue a wounded engine room wiper despite his own serious wounds, towing the other man half an hour to reach a lifeboat.
