= Franklin D'Olier =

National Commander of the American Legion from 1919 to 1920

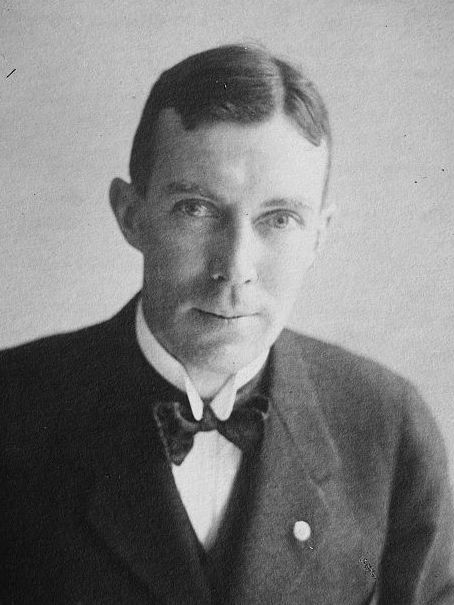
- D'Olier in 1920
- Born: April 28, 1877; Burlington, New Jersey, U.S.
- Died: December 10, 1953 (aged 76); Morristown, New Jersey, U.S.
- Resting place: St. Mary's Episcopal Church, Burlington, New Jersey, U.S.
- Education: Princeton University (BA)
- Occupation: Businessman
- Title: 1st National Commander of The American Legion
- Term: 1919 – 1920
- Predecessor: Henry D. Lindsley (as Chairman of The American Legion)
- Successor: Frederick W. Galbraith Jr.
- Spouse: Helen Kitchen D'Olier (m. 1903; died 1950)
- Relatives: Mary Schenck Woolman (aunt); F. D. Reeve (grandson); Christopher Reeve (great-grandson)
- Awards: Medal for Merit
- Military service
- Branch: United States Army
- Service years: 1917–1919
- Rank: Lieutenant Colonel
- Commands: American Salvage Depot at Saint Pierre des Corps
- Battles: World War I; Defensive Sector
- Awards: Distinguished Service Medal; Legion of Honor (France); See more

Franklin D'Olier (April 28, 1877 – December 10, 1953) was an American businessman who served as the first national commander of The American Legion from 1919 to 1920. He was also the grandfather of academic writer and poet F. D. Reeve, and the great-grandfather of actor Christopher Reeve.

== Early life ==
Franklin D'Olier was born April 28, 1877, in Burlington, New Jersey, the son of Annie Kay (née Woolman) and William D'Olier. He attended local school and prepared for Princeton University. He was graduated from Princeton in 1898, and immediately entered business with his father of William D'Olier & Company, commission merchants in cotton and cotton yarns, in Philadelphia. Upon his father's retirement from business, the firm name was changed to Franklin D'Olier & Company.

== World War I ==
D'Olier entered the military service of the United States in April, 1917, as a captain in the Quartermaster Corps. After a few weeks' service at the Philadelphia depot and several months at Boston, he was ordered to France in August, 1917. Owing to the great scarcity of tonnage at that time and the necessity for salvaging material on a large scale, D'Olier was assigned to the newly organized salvage service, and in January, 1918, took command of the first salvage depot that was operated by the American Army.

Within six months the work had grown so rapidly that the personnel increased from 12 to 6,000 and this depot was salvaging for about 750,000 men and was larger than any depot operated by either the British or French armies. This depot was at Saint Pierre des Corps, near Tours, France, the headquarters of the Service of Supply.

In July, 1918, Captain D'Olier was ordered to Lyon, France, to organize the second large depot, which at the time of the armistice had a capacity of taking care of salvaging for upward of a million and a half men. He was promoted to the rank of major and then lieutenant colonel and assigned to the General Staff, and after two years' service in the army, twenty months of which was in the A. E. F., was discharged from the service in April, 1919.

== The American Legion ==
D'Olier was one of the original 20 men who initiated The American Legion in France, February 15, 1919, and attended the Paris caucus of The American Legion on March 15, 1919. After his discharge from the service, D'Olier joined Theodore Roosevelt Jr., who was at that time—early in 1919—perfecting the preliminary organization of The American Legion in the United States preparatory to the St. Louis caucus, May 8, 9 and 10. He was chairman of the Pennsylvania delegation at the St. Louis Caucus and a member of the National Executive Committee from Pennsylvania.

After the St. Louis caucus he was placed in charge of the State Organization Division at national headquarters, 19 West 44th Street, Manhattan, New York City, and gave his entire time without any remuneration whatsoever to American Legion work in preparation for the Minneapolis convention. He was elected National Commander of The American Legion at the national convention in Minneapolis November 12, 1919.

== Later life ==
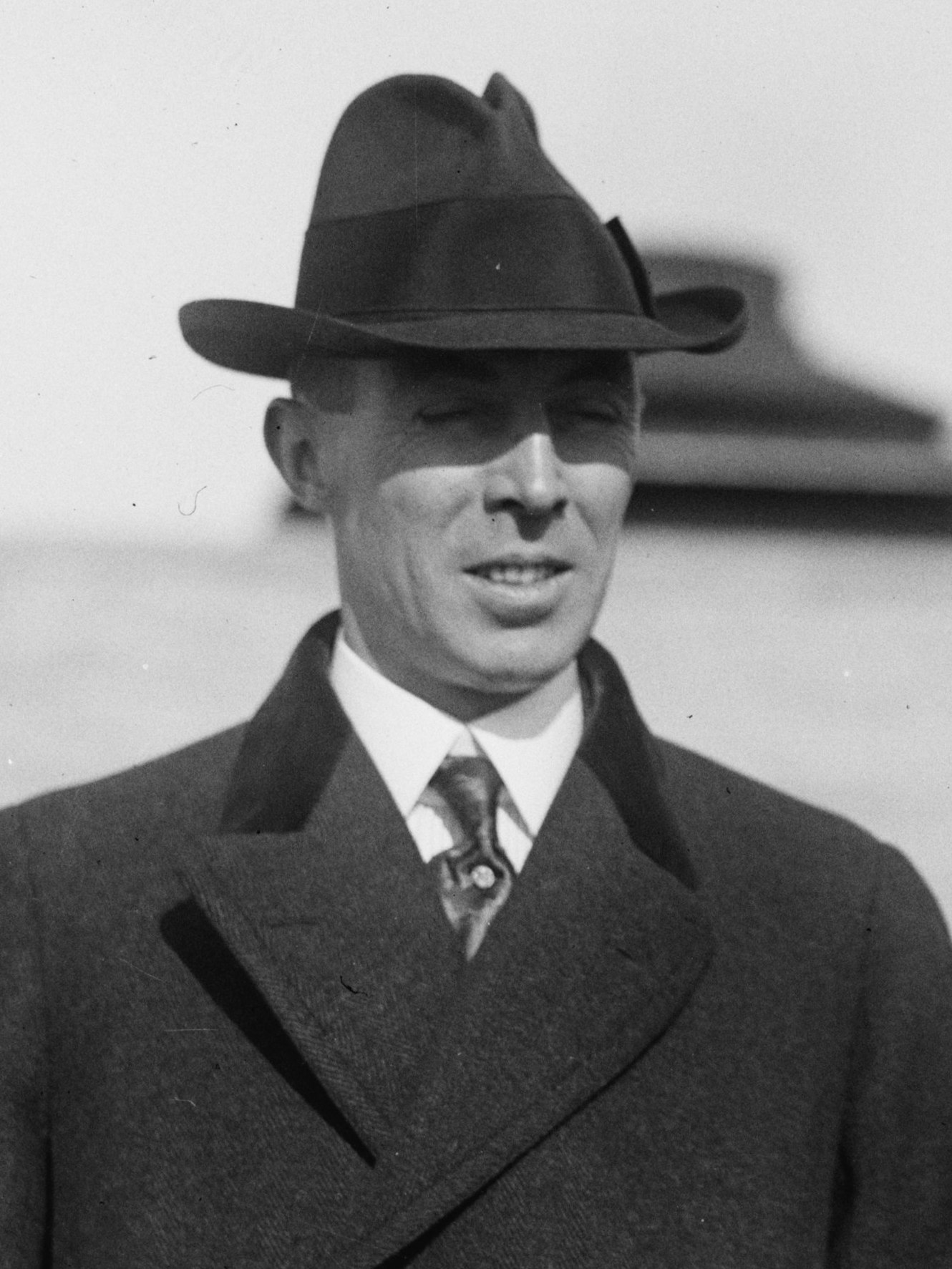
D'Olier after the Great War

In 1926 D'Olier joined the Prudential Insurance Company as vice president and became president of the company in 1938. Under his direction the company was converted from a stock corporation to a mutual company owned entirely by its policyholders.

In 1944 in answer to a request by Secretary of War Stimson, D'Olier organized and directed the United States Strategic Bombing Survey. This group of observers and technicians worked in both the European and Pacific theaters of war gathering data on the effectiveness of air bombardment "upon the will and capacity of the enemy to resist." Among the recommendations made in the report of the mission were those asking for a separate Air Force and creation of a Department of Defense.

In 1946 D'Olier became chairman of the board of directors of Prudential and continued to serve actively as a director of the company until his death. He was also a director of the Howard Savings Institution of Newark, New Jersey; National Biscuit Company; Pennsylvania Railroad; General Refractories Company; American Enka Corporation and the Morristown Trust Company.

At various times he had been called upon to serve as chairman of the New Jersey committee of the U. S. Treasury War Finance Committee; state chairman of the USO; Civilian Defense director of the 2d Corps area and as a member of the New Jersey State Economic Commission. He was a life trustee of Princeton university.

He died on December 10, 1953, in Morristown, New Jersey, a year after the birth of his great-grandson Christopher Reeve.

== Military awards ==
D'Olier was the recipient of the following military awards:

Distinguished Service Medal
Medal for Merit	World War I Victory Medal with bronze campaign star	Commander of the Legion of Honor (France)

== See also ==
- List of members of the American Legion
- List of people from New Jersey
- List of Princeton University people

Non-profit organization positions
Preceded by Henry D. Lindsley as Chairman of The American Legion	National Commander of The American Legion; 1919–1920	Succeeded by Frederick W. Galbraith Jr.
