= Frederick W. Galbraith =

National Commander of the American Legion from 1920 to 1921

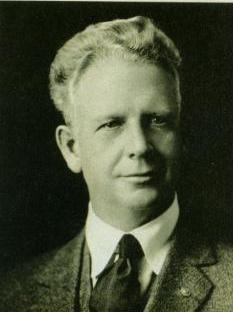
- Born: Frederick William Galbraith, Jr. May 6, 1874; Watertown Arsenal, Massachusetts, U.S.
- Died: June 9, 1921 (aged 47); Indianapolis, Indiana, U.S.
- Resting place: Spring Grove Cemetery, Cincinnati, Ohio, U.S. 39°10′16.5″N 84°31′33.6″W
- Education: Massachusetts Nautical Training School
- Occupation: Businessman
- Title: 2nd National Commander of The American Legion
- Term: 1920 – 1921
- Predecessor: Franklin D'Olier
- Successor: John G. Emery
- Children: 3
- Military service
- Branch: United States Army
- Rank: Colonel
- Commands: 147th Infantry Regiment
- Battles: World War I; Ypres-Lys; Meuse-Argonne (WIA); Defensive Sector
- Awards: Distinguished Service Cross

Frederick William Galbraith Jr. (May 6, 1874 – June 9, 1921) was the second national commander of The American Legion from 1920 to 1921. He was a highly decorated World War I veteran who was instrumental in helping to make the Legion the largest and most powerful war veterans' association in the United States.

== Early life and education ==
Frederick William Galbraith, Jr. was born in Watertown Arsenal, Massachusetts, on May 6, 1874. His two brothers were college professors, but he left school at the age of 10 to go with his father to San Diego, California, for work. He was soon the youngest track walker on the Southern Pacific Railroad. At thirteen he returned to Massachusetts and began working in a manufacturing plant. At night he studied for the entrance exams at the U.S. Naval Academy. Denied admission because he was six months too old, he then entered the Massachusetts Nautical Training School. He completed its three-year course in a year and was soon a third mate on a vessel bound for Japan.

When Galbraith was twenty-four he was a master of a ship. On one occasion in the South China Sea he rescued the entire crew of another vessel that had caught fire in a storm. This feat of heroism was widely celebrated at the time in the Asiatic region. He was presented with a silver medal in recognition of his actions. After six years at sea he returned to become the treasurer of a bankrupt paper box company in Springfield, Massachusetts. The next year he was able to use his management skills to save the company $100,000 and thenceforth his rise in the business world was rapid. He eventually became an officer or director with several large corporations.

On November 1, 1905 Galbraith was elected as a hereditary companion of the Ohio Commandery of Military Order of the Loyal Legion of the United States by right of his father's service as a brevet lieutenant-colonel and aide-de-camp in the Union Army during the American Civil War. His father, Frederic W. Galbraith, Sr., served as aide to Major-General Oliver O. Howard at the Battle of Gettysburg and during Sherman's March to the Sea.

== World War I ==
When the United States entered World War I, Galbraith became a soldier by joining the First Infantry Regiment, Ohio National Guard. He was commanding when it became the 147th Infantry Regiment, an element of the 37th Division (later redesignated as the 37th Infantry Division). Wounded in combat and later cited for valor, Galbraith was decorated with the Distinguished Service Cross, Distinguished Service Medal, French Legion d'honneur, two croix de guerre, and Victory Medal.

== The American Legion ==
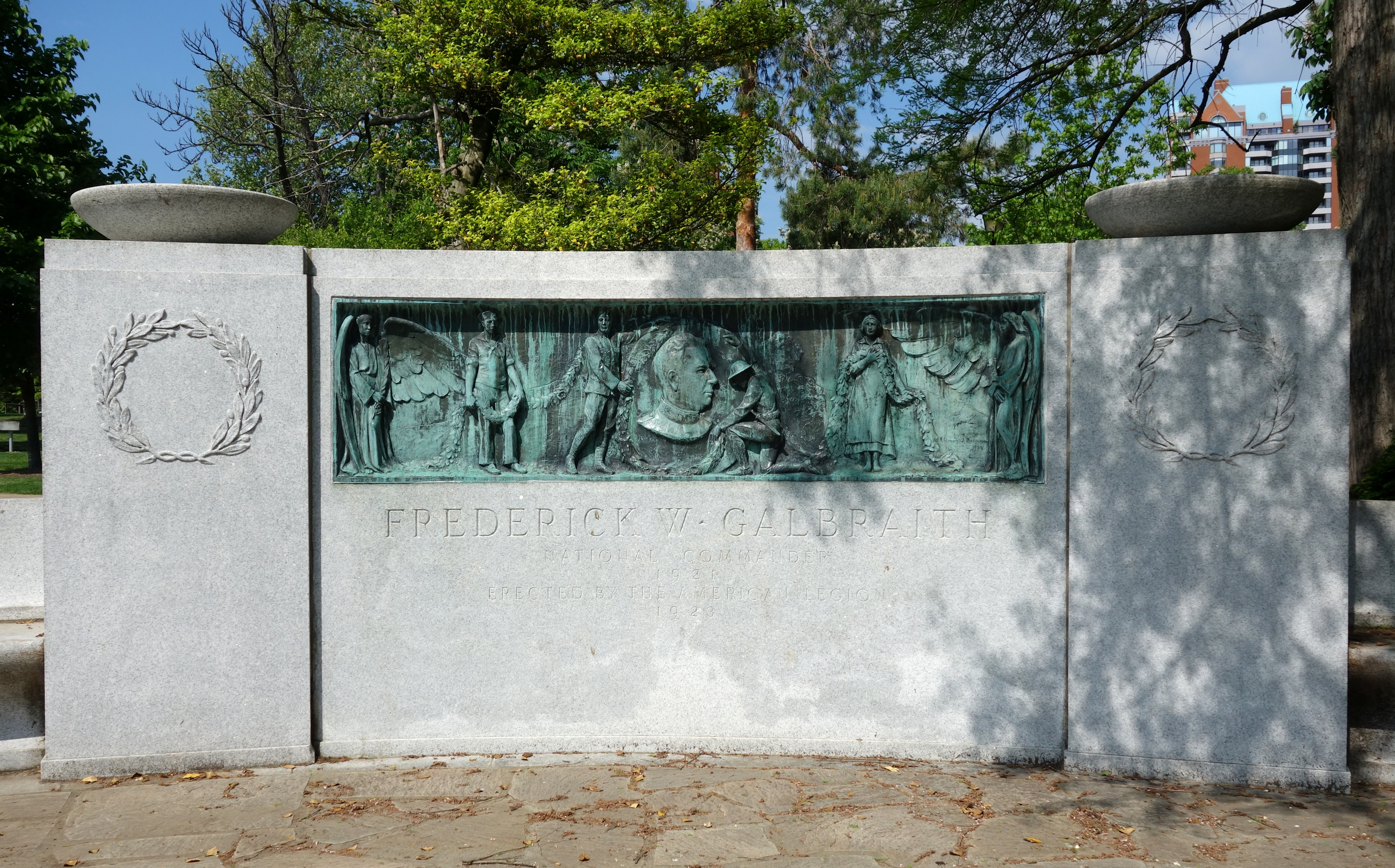
The Galbraith Memorial in Eden Park, Cincinnati

At the second national convention of The American Legion in Cleveland, Ohio, in 1920 Galbraith was elected to the office of the national commander. He worked to enact legislation for aid to disabled U.S. veterans and for a scheme to pay veterans of the war an "adjusted compensation" for their service. He became friends with President Warren Harding and was considered the leading spokesman for veterans around the nation.

Galbraith was killed in an automobile accident on June 9, 1921, in Indianapolis, Indiana. The vehicle in which he was riding took a turn too quickly and flipped off of the road. Galbraith was ejected from the car, struck his head on a piece of concrete that had been left by a road crew, and died instantly. His death made national news and thousands attended his funeral in Cincinnati, Ohio.

== Honors ==
The SS Frederic W. Galbraith [sic] was named after him.

Non-profit organization positions
Preceded by Franklin D'Olier	National Commander of The American Legion; 1920 – 1921	Succeeded by John G. Emery
