= SS Frederic W. Galbraith =

Liberty ship of WWII

History

United States
- Name: Frederic W. Galbraith
- Namesake: Frederick W. Galbraith
- Owner: War Shipping Administration (WSA)
- Operator: South Atlantic Steamship Lines
- Ordered: as type (EC2-S-C1) hull, MC hull 2503
- Awarded: 23 April 1943
- Builder: St. Johns River Shipbuilding Company, Jacksonville, Florida
- Cost: $948,517
- Yard number: 67
- Way number: 1
- Laid down: 30 September 1944
- Launched: 2 November 1944
- Completed: 14 November 1944
- Identification: Call sign: KYUQ
- Fate: Laid up in the National Defense Reserve Fleet, Wilmington, North Carolina, 4 March 1948; Laid up in the National Defense Reserve Fleet, Mobile, Alabama, 26 May 1952; Sold for scrapping, 2 November 1970, withdrawn from fleet, 17 November 1970

General characteristics
- Class & type: Liberty ship; type EC2-S-C1, standard
- Tonnage: 10,865 LT DWT; 7,176 GRT
- Displacement: 3,380 long tons (3,434 t) (light); 14,245 long tons (14,474 t) (max)
- Length: 441 feet 6 inches (135 m) oa; 416 feet (127 m) pp; 427 feet (130 m) lwl
- Beam: 57 feet (17 m)
- Draft: 27 ft 9.25 in (8.4646 m)
- Installed power: 2 × Oil fired 450 °F (232 °C) boilers, operating at 220 psi (1,500 kPa); 2,500 hp (1,900 kW)
- Propulsion: 1 × triple-expansion steam engine, (manufactured by General Machinery Corp., Hamilton, Ohio); 1 × screw propeller
- Speed: 11.5 knots (21.3 km/h; 13.2 mph)
- Capacity: 562,608 cubic feet (15,931 m^{3}) (grain); 499,573 cubic feet (14,146 m^{3}) (bale)
- Complement: 38–62 USMM; 21–40 USNAG
- Armament: Varied by ship; Bow-mounted 3-inch (76 mm)/50-caliber gun; Stern-mounted 4-inch (102 mm)/50-caliber gun; 2–8 × single 20-millimeter (0.79 in) Oerlikon anti-aircraft (AA) cannons and/or, 2–8 × 37-millimeter (1.46 in) M1 AA guns

SS Frederic W. Galbraith was a Liberty ship built in the United States during World War II. She was named after Frederick W. Galbraith, the national commander of the American Legion, from 1920 to 1921. He was a decorated World War I veteran who was instrumental in helping to make the legion the largest war veterans' organization in the US.

== Construction ==
Frederic W. Galbraith was laid down on 30 September 1944, under a Maritime Commission (MARCOM) contract, MC hull 2503, by the St. Johns River Shipbuilding Company, Jacksonville, Florida; and was launched on 2 November 1944.

== History ==
She was allocated to the South Atlantic Steamship Lines, on 14 November 1944. On 4 March 1948, she was laid up in the National Defense Reserve Fleet, Wilmington, North Carolina. On 26 May 1952, she was laid up in the National Defense Reserve Fleet, Mobile, Alabama. She was sold for scrapping, 2 November 1970, to Union Minerals & Alloys Corp., for $41,137. She was removed from the fleet, 17 November 1970.

== Bibliography ==
- "St. John's River Shipbuilding, Jacksonville FL". www.ShipbuildingHistory.com. 16 October 2010.
- Maritime Administration. "Frederic W. Galbraith". Ship History Database Vessel Status Card. U.S. Department of Transportation, Maritime Administration.
- Davies, James (May 2004). "Specifications (As-Built)" (PDF). p. 23.
- "SS Frederic W. Galbraith".
