= South Atlantic Steamship Company =

Passenger and cargo shipping company

South Atlantic steamship line
- Industry: Maritime transport
- Founded: 1928
- Defunct: 1961
- Headquarters: Savannah, Georgia
- Area served: Worldwide
- Services: Cargo and Passengers Liners

The South Atlantic Steamship Company was a US passenger and cargo shipping line, founded in 1928 in Savannah, Georgia. In 1940 or 1941 it renamed itself the South Atlantic Steamship Line. It began by chartering foreign ships to work in the tramp trade. The company later added scheduled cargo services. In 1958 United States Lines took over the South Atlantic Steamship Line. In 1961 United States Lines closed the company, and renamed its remaining ships. The company's US home ports were: Jacksonville, Florida, Savannah, Wilmington, North Carolina and Charleston, South Carolina. Its main foreign ports were: London, Liverpool and Manchester, all in the UK. At its peak, it operated 60 ships in World War II. In World War II the South Atlantic steamship line was active with charter shipping with the United States Maritime Commission and War Shipping Administration (WSA). During the war, the South Atlantic Steamship Line operated Victory ships and Liberty ships.

== World War II ==
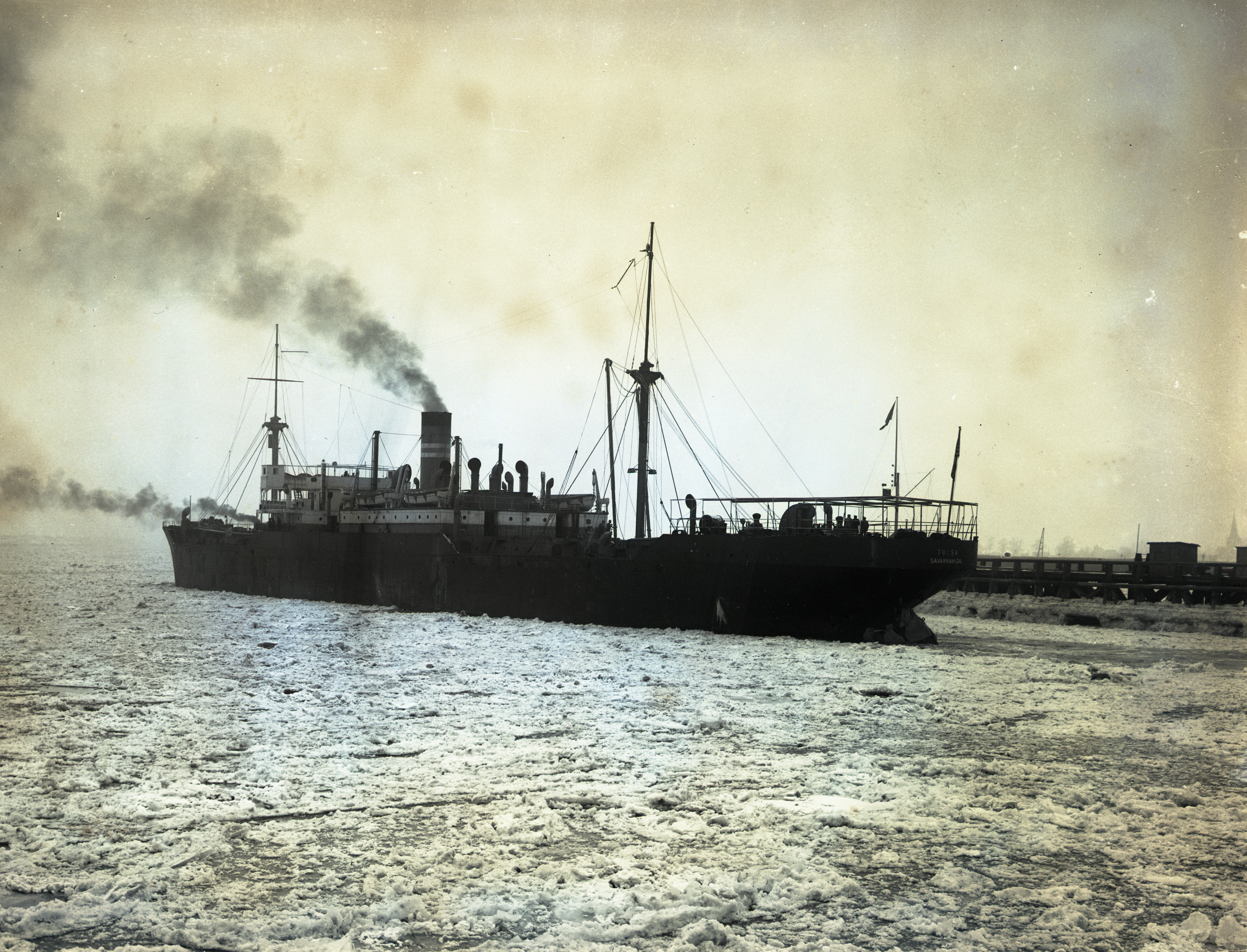
Tulsa, which the company acquired from the United States Shipping Board in 1928 or 1929

The South Atlantic Steamship Company was part of the World War II United States Merchant Navy. Its ships were defensively armed, and carried United States Navy Armed Guard gun crews.

== Ships ==
Some ships charted or owned by South Atlantic steamship line:

=== Victory Ships ===
- Cranston Victory
- Dickens

=== Liberty Ships ===
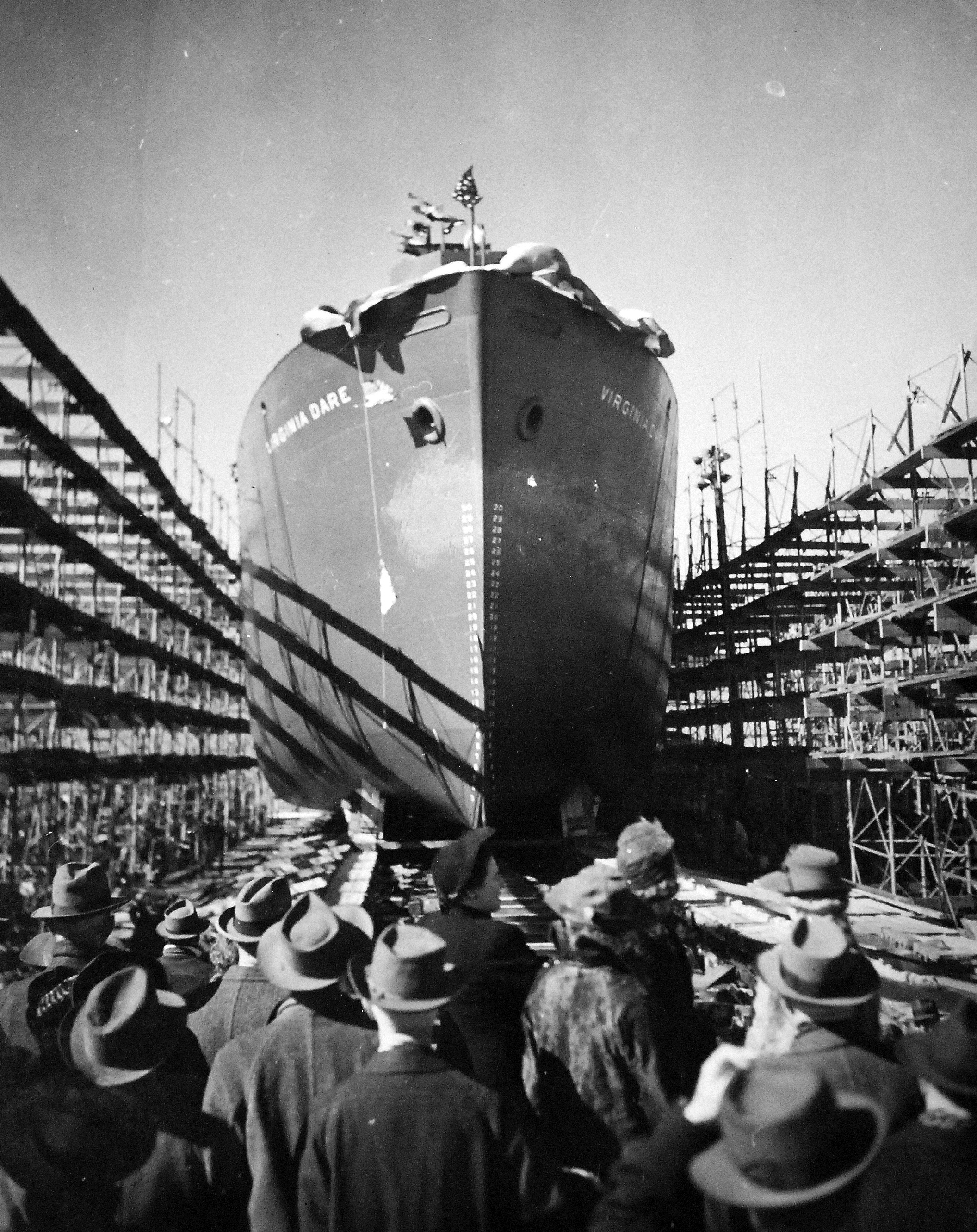
Virginia Dare being launched in 1942

- Edwin G. Weed
- Frederic W. Galbraith
- Henry Bacon
- SS Howard E. Coffin
- John A. Treutlen, sank
- John Lawson
- John M. Brooke
- John M. Palmer
- John Sherman
- Johns Hopkins
- Richard Caswell
- Telfair Stockton
- Theodore Dwight Weld, sank 1943
- Theodore Parker
- Thomas Hooker, sank 1943
- Thomas Say
- Thomas W. Murray
- Virginia Dare, sank

=== Other ships ===
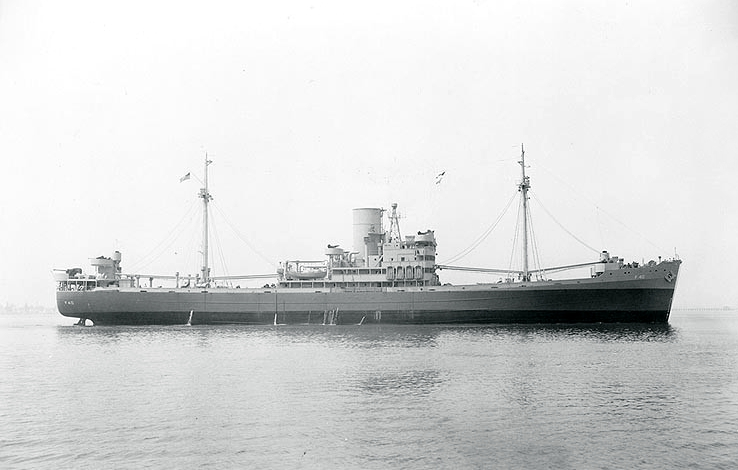
USS Saturn, which became the South Atlantic Steamship Line's Sting

- Coastal Spartan
- Fluor Spar
- Liberty Glo
- Magmeric
- Saccarappa
- Schoharie
- Shickshinny
- Southland
- Southport
- Southstar
- Southwind
- Sting
- Sundance
- Tulsa
- Wildwood

== See also ==
- World War II United States Merchant Navy
