= USNS Clarksburg =

- Typical Victory Ship.

History

United States
- Name: SS Clarksburg Victory
- Namesake: Clarksburg, California
- Owner: War Shipping Administration
- Operator: Olympic Steamship Company
- Builder: California Shipbuilding Corporation, Los Angeles
- Laid down: 9 July 1945
- Launched: 15 September 1945
- In service: 15 October 1945
- Identification: IMO number: 5075579
- Fate: Scrapped, 1984

General characteristics
- Type: Type VC2-S-AP2 Victory ship
- Displacement: 4,512 long tons (4,584 t) light; 15,589 long tons (15,839 t) full load
- Length: 455 ft (139 m)
- Beam: 62 ft (19 m)
- Draft: 29 ft (8.8 m)
- Propulsion: Cross-compound steam turbine; 8,500 shp (6,338 kW); Single screw
- Speed: 15.5 knots (28.7 km/h; 17.8 mph)

USNS Clarksburg (T-AG-183) - SS Clarksburg Victory was one of 12 Victory ships scheduled to be acquired by the United States Navy in February 1966 and converted into Forward Depot Ships and placed into service with the Military Sea Transport Service, The Clarksburg Victory (MCV-888) was chosen for this conversion and assigned the name Clarksburg but the program was canceled and the ships were not acquired by the Navy. She was laid down on 9 July 1945 during the time World War II was still active in the Pacific War. But, with the surrender of Japan on 15 August 1945, she was not needed to help with the bloody invasion of Japan mainland. She was placed in service on 15 October 1945.

Victory ships were designed to replace the earlier Liberty Ships. Liberty ships were designed to be used just for WW2. Victory ships were designed to last longer and serve the US Navy after the war. The Victory ship differed from a Liberty ship in that they were: faster, longer and wider, taller, a thinner stack set farther toward the superstructure and had a long raised forecastle.

== World War II ==
She was operated by Olympic Steamship Company as a United States Merchant Marine ship and help bring troops home and take supplies to help war torn nations under the Marshall Plan. After the war, in 1949 she was laid up at Mobile, Alabama in the United States Navy reserve fleets.

== Korean War ==
For the Korean War she served in the Hungnam Evacuation as a Military Sea Transportation Service and Merchant Ship Participating in Hungnam Korea Redeployment.

== Vietnam War ==
In 1966 she was reactivated for service in the Vietnam War. At the end of the war in 1970 she was laid up at Suisun Bay in the Navy reserve fleet. In 1984 she was scrapped Kaohsiung, Taiwan.

== See also ==
- List of Victory ships
- Liberty ship
- Type C1 ship
- Type C2 ship
- Type C3 ship
- SS Lane Victory
- SS Red Oak Victory

== Sources ==
- Sawyer, L.A. and W.H. Mitchell. Victory ships and tankers: The history of the ‘Victory’ type cargo ships and of the tankers built in the United States of America during World War II, Cornell Maritime Press, 1974, 0-87033-182-5.
- United States Maritime Commission:
- Victory Cargo Ships
