= USS Crockett (APA-148) =

Attack transport ship in United States Navy

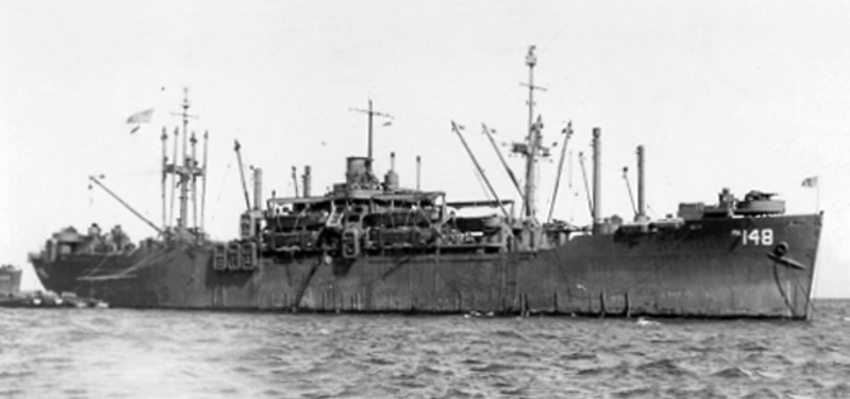

History

United States
- Name: USS Crockett
- Namesake: Crockett County, Tennessee; Crockett County, Texas
- Ordered: as type VC2-S-AP5
- Laid down: date unknown
- Launched: 28 November 1944
- Acquired: 18 January 1945
- Commissioned: 18 January 1945
- In service: 5 June 1946
- Out of service: 15 October 1946
- Stricken: 1 October 1958
- Fate: Scrapped 1985

General characteristics
- Displacement: 12,450 tons (full load)
- Length: 455 ft 0 in (138.68 m)
- Beam: 62 ft 0 in (18.90 m)
- Draught: 24 ft 0 in (7.32 m)
- Speed: 19 knots
- Complement: 536
- Armament: one 5 in (130 mm) gun mount, twelve 40 mm gun mounts, ten 20 mm gun mounts

USS Crockett (APA-148) was a Haskell-class attack transport in service with the United States Navy from 1945 to 1946. She was scrapped in 1985.

== History ==
Crockett (APA-148) was launched 28 November 1944 by Kaiser Shipbuilding, Inc., Vancouver, Washington, under a Maritime Commission contract; sponsored by Mrs. L. D. Whitgrove, wife of Captain Whitgrove; acquired by the Navy 18 January 1945; and commissioned the same day.

Departing San Diego, California, 5 April 1945, Crockett discharged troops and cargo at Pearl Harbor from 12 to 27 April, then carried men of a Naval construction battalion to Samar, arriving 17 May.

Embarking Army troops, Crockett sailed by way of Ulithi for Okinawa where from 24 to 27 June she unloaded under air attack and embarked survivors of ships lost at Okinawa for transfer to San Francisco, California.

After a short availability in the States (17–30 July), Crockett returned to transport duty in the Pacific Ocean, carrying passengers and cargo to Guam, and transporting soldiers from Manila to Aomori, Japan, for occupation duty. She was assigned to "Operation Magic Carpet" duty, returning men eligible for discharge, and arrived at San Diego, California, 21 October with her first group of veterans. Crockett returned from a second voyage to Okinawa on 8 December, sailed from Seattle, Washington, 12 January 1946, and arrived at Norfolk, Virginia, 1 February.

=== Decommissioning and fate ===
She was placed in commission, in reserve 5 June, and out of commission in reserve 15 October 1946. She was transferred to the Maritime Commission for disposal 1 October 1958. Crockett was sold for scrapping in July 1985 to Chesapeake Salvage, Portsmouth, Virginia (USA).

== Awards ==
Crockett received one battle star for service in World War II.
