= SS Clarksdale Victory =

Victory ship of the United States

- Typical Victory Ship.

History

United States
- Name: Clarksdale Victory
- Namesake: Clarksdale, Mississippi
- Owner: War Shipping Administration
- Operator: American President Lines
- Builder: California Shipbuilding Company, Los Angeles
- Laid down: December 2, 1944
- Launched: January 27, 1945
- Completed: February 26, 1945
- Fate: Sank 1947 off the coast of British Columbia

General characteristics
- Class & type: VC2-S-AP3 Victory ship
- Tonnage: 7,612 GRT, 4,553 NRT
- Displacement: 15,200 tons
- Length: 455 ft (139 m)
- Beam: 62 ft (19 m)
- Draught: 28 ft (8.5 m)
- Installed power: 8,500 shp (6,300 kW)
- Propulsion: HP & LP turbines geared to a single 20.5-foot (6.2 m) propeller
- Speed: 16.5 knots (30.6 km/h; 19.0 mph)
- Boats & landing craft carried: 4 lifeboats
- Complement: 62 Merchant Marine and 28 US Naval Armed Guards
- Armament: 1 × 5-inch (127 mm)/38 caliber gun; 1 × 3-inch (76 mm)/50 caliber gun; 8 × 20 mm Oerlikon

SS Clarksdale Victory was the 80th Victory ship built during World War II. She was launched by the California Shipbuilding Company on January 27, 1945, and completed on February 26, 1945. The ship’s United States Maritime Commission designation was VC2-S-AP3, hull number 80. She was built in just 86 days under the Emergency Shipbuilding program. Clarksdale Victory served in the Pacific Ocean during World War II. Victory ships were designed to replace the earlier Liberty ships. Liberty ships were designed to be used just for World War II. Victory ships were designed to last longer and serve the US Navy after the war. The Victory ship differed from a Liberty ship in that they were: faster, longer and wider, taller, a thinner stack set farther toward the superstructure and had a long raised forecastle.

== World War II ==
During World War II Clarksdale Victory was a cargo supply ship. She took supplies to support the troops at the Battle of Okinawa. She was at Okinawa from April 26 to May 8, 1945. On April 27, 1945 a shell landed only 15 yards from the Clarksdale Victory. The shell exploded and fragments landed on her deck. One of Clarksdale Victory's lifeboats was damaged by the fragments. On the same day nearby, Canada Victory was hit by a kamikaze plane; the explosion in a cargo hold blew out the side of the ship, and she sank in seven minutes.

== After the War ==
After the war, in January of 1946 she came alongside USS Taluga at Yokohama, Japan, and unloaded 220 barrels (35 m^{3}) of diesel oil.

USAT Clarksdale Victory was in US Army Transport service when ran aground and was wrecked on the British Columbia, Canada coastline off Hippa Reef Island, near Graham Island on November 24, 1947. Clarksdale Victory lost 49 of her 53 crew that day. She was en route from Whittier, Alaska to Seattle. She broke in two due to 50-foot waves pounding her into the rocks; she sank quickly. SS Denali was sent out in a rescue effort, but due to the high waves had to call off the rescue. The Coast Guard cutters USCGC Wachusett and USCGC Citrus rescued four survivors and the bodies of three of the dead.

== Honors ==
The crew of the Naval Armed Guard on SS Clarksdale Victory' earned "Battle Stars" in World War II for war action during the assault occupation of Okinawa from 26 April 1945 to 8 May 1945.

== See also ==
- List of Victory ships
- Liberty ship
- Type C1 ship
- Type C2 ship
- Type C3 ship

== Sources ==
- Sawyer, L.A. and W.H. Mitchell. Victory ships and tankers: The history of the ‘Victory’ type cargo ships and of the tankers built in the United States of America during World War II, Cornell Maritime Press, 1974, 0-87033-182-5.
- United States Maritime Commission:
- Victory Cargo Ships
