= SS Howard E. Coffin =

World War II Liberty ship of the United States

History

United States
- Name: Howard E. Coffin
- Namesake: Howard E. Coffin
- Ordered: as type (EC2-S-C1) hull, MC hull 1512
- Builder: J.A. Jones Construction, Brunswick, Georgia
- Cost: $1,332,599
- Yard number: 128
- Way number: 6
- Laid down: 30 November 1943
- Launched: 21 January 1944
- Sponsored by: Mrs. Alfred W. Jones
- Completed: 31 January 1944
- Identification: Call Signal: KVOH
- Fate: Sold, 20 January 1947

Italy
- Name: Patrizia Fassio
- Owner: Villian & Fassio, Genoa
- Acquired: 30 January 1947
- Fate: Scrapped, October 1968

General characteristics
- Class & type: Liberty ship; type EC2-S-C1, standard
- Tonnage: 10,865 LT DWT; 7,176 GRT
- Displacement: 3,380 long tons (3,434 t) (light); 14,245 long tons (14,474 t) (max)
- Length: 441 feet 6 inches (135 m) oa; 416 feet (127 m) pp; 427 feet (130 m) lwl
- Beam: 57 feet (17 m)
- Draft: 27 ft 9.25 in (8.4646 m)
- Installed power: 2 × Oil fired 450 °F (232 °C) boilers, operating at 220 psi (1,500 kPa); 2,500 hp (1,900 kW)
- Propulsion: 1 × triple-expansion steam engine, (manufactured by General Machinery Corp., Hamilton, Ohio); 1 × screw propeller
- Speed: 11.5 knots (21.3 km/h; 13.2 mph)
- Capacity: 562,608 cubic feet (15,931 m^{3}) (grain); 499,573 cubic feet (14,146 m^{3}) (bale)
- Complement: 38–62 USMM; 21–40 USNAG
- Armament: Varied by ship; Bow-mounted 3-inch (76 mm)/50-caliber gun; Stern-mounted 4-inch (102 mm)/50-caliber gun; 2–8 × single 20-millimeter (0.79 in) Oerlikon anti-aircraft (AA) cannons and/or, 2–8 × 37-millimeter (1.46 in) M1 AA guns

SS Howard E. Coffin was a Liberty ship built in the United States during World War II. She was named after Howard E. Coffin, one of the founders of the Hudson Motor Car Company and a charter member of The Society of Automotive Engineers and president in 1910.

== Construction ==
Howard E. Coffin was laid down on 30 November 1943, under a United States Maritime Commission (MARCOM) contract, MC hull 1512, by J.A. Jones Construction, Brunswick, Georgia; she was sponsored by Mrs. Alfred W. Jones, and launched on 21 January 1944.

== History ==
She was allocated to the South Atlantic Steamship Lines, on 31 January 1944. On 18 July 1946, she was laid up in the National Defense Reserve Fleet in the James River Group, Lee Hall, Virginia. On 20 January 1947, she was turned over to the Italian Government, which in turn sold it to Villian & Fassio, Genoa, for $544,566, on 30 January 1947. She was renamed Patrizia Fassio. She was scrapped in October 1968.

== Bibliography ==
- "Jones Construction, Brunswick GA". ShipbuildingHistory.com. 13 October 2010.
- "Liberty Ships – World War II".
- Maritime Administration. "Howard E. Coffin". Ship History Database Vessel Status Card. U.S. Department of Transportation, Maritime Administration. Archived from the original on 12 December 2019.
- Davies, James (May 2004). "Specifications (As-Built)" (PDF). p. 23.
- "SS Howard E. Coffin".
