= SS Cranston Victory =

Victory ship of the United States

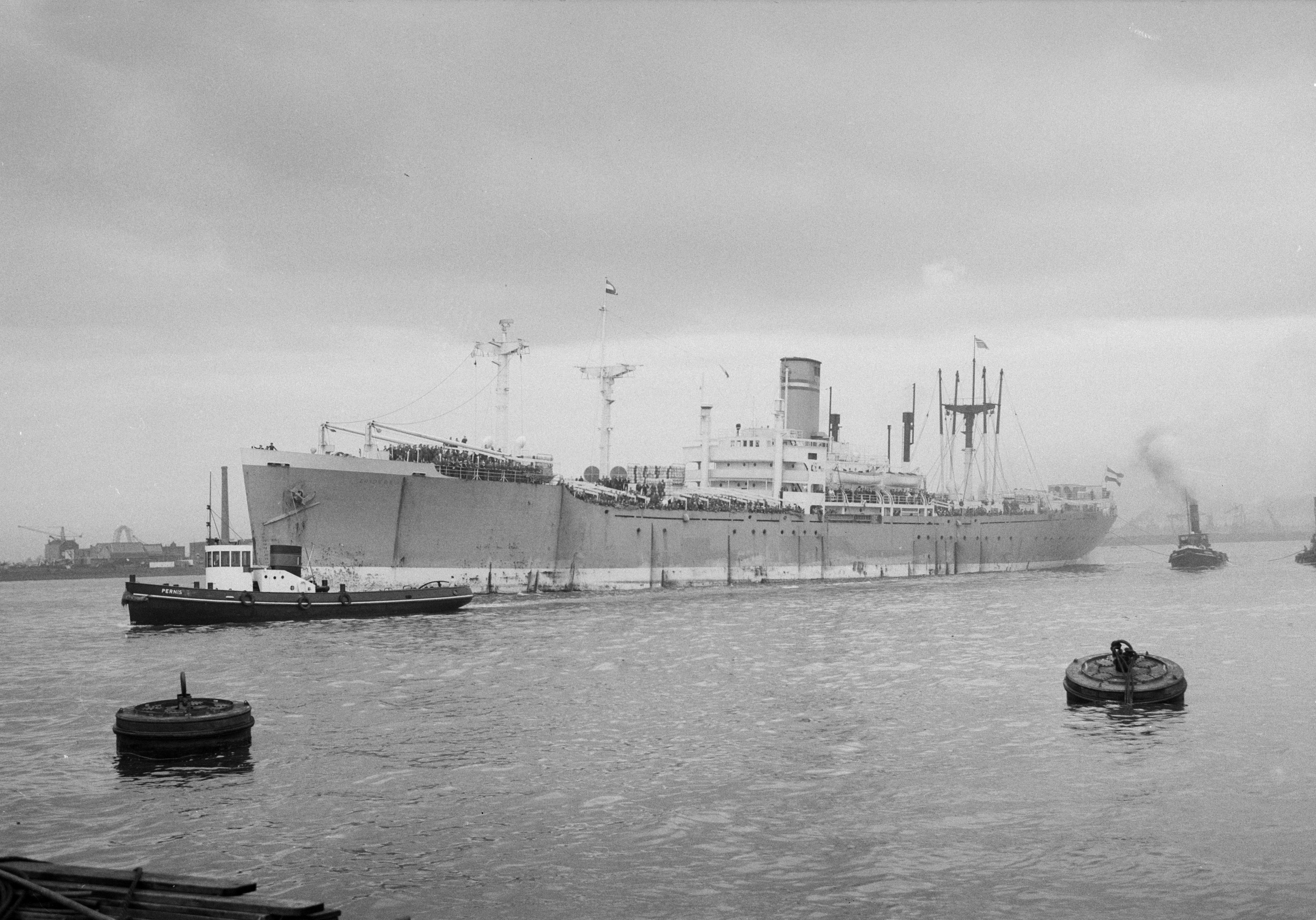
- Zuiderkruis seen in 1948

History

United States
- Name: Cranston Victory
- Namesake: Cranston, Rhode Island
- Owner: War Shipping Administration
- Operator: South Atlantic Steamship Company
- Builder: Oregon Shipbuilding Company
- Laid down: March 13, 1944
- Launched: May 5, 1944
- Completed: May 25, 1944
- Fate: Sold

Netherlands
- Name: Zuiderkruis
- Owner: Netherlands Gov’t, then Rotterdam Lloyd
- Operator: Netherlands Gov't, then Rotterdam Lloyd
- Fate: Sold

Netherlands
- Name: Zuiderkruis 1951 Rebuilt as emigrant passenger ship
- Fate: Sold

Netherlands
- Name: Zuiderkruis 1960
- Operator: Rebuilt
- Fate: Scrapped 1969 at Bilbao.

Netherlands
- Name: NV Scheepvaart Maats Trans-Oceaan 1963
- Operator: Netherlands Navy accommodation and store ship at Den Helder.
- Fate: Sold

General characteristics
- Class & type: VC2-S-AP3 Victory ship
- Tonnage: 7,612 GRT, 4,553 NRT
- Displacement: 15,200 tons
- Length: 455 ft (139 m)
- Beam: 62 ft (19 m)
- Draft: 28 ft (8.5 m)
- Installed power: 8,500 shp (6,300 kW)
- Propulsion: HP & LP turbines geared to a single 20.5-foot (6.2 m) propeller
- Speed: 16.5 knots
- Boats & landing craft carried: 4 Lifeboats
- Complement: 62 Merchant Marine and 28 US Naval Armed Guards
- Armament: 1 × 5-inch (127 mm)/38 caliber gun; 1 × 3-inch (76 mm)/50 caliber gun; 8 × 20 mm Oerlikon

SS Cranston Victory was the 19th of 531 Victory ships built during World War II. Cranston was launched by the Oregon Shipbuilding Corporation on 12 January 1944, completing its journey on 28 February 1944. The ship's United States Maritime Commission designation was VC2-S-AP3, hull number 103 (1019). The Maritime Commission turned it over to a civilian contractor, the South Atlantic Steamship Company, for operation.

The Victory ships were designed to replace the earlier Liberty ships that were designed to be used exclusively for World War II. Victory ships were designed to last longer and serve the US Navy after the war as these were faster, longer, wider, taller, had a thinner stack set farther toward the superstructure, and had a long raised forecastle.

== World War II ==
Cranston Victory was used as a troopship in World War II in the Pacific and Atlantic Oceans, able to transport up to 1600 troops. In 1945, it traveled from Japan to Seattle. On August 27, 1945, Cranston Victory arrived in the US from Europe with troops. In October 1945, Cranston Victory arrived in New York Harbor from Europe with troops. On December 7, 1945, the ship pulled into Boston with troops from Europe.

Cranston Victory and 96 other Victory ships were converted to troop ships to bring the US soldiers home as part of Operation Magic Carpet. These ships had accommodations with fully ventilated and heated rooms. Many had troop warm bunks, a hospital, galleys, washrooms, and public rooms. Cranston Victory's duties were short lived as the war came to an end.

== Private use ==
After the war in 1946 it was laid up in the James River National Defense Reserve Fleet in Virginia. Then on March 14, 1947, Cranston Victory was sold for $1,005,431 to the Netherlands Government operated by Rotterdam Lloyd and named Zuiderkruis. Initially, the Netherlands Government used the ship to move troops to the Dutch East Indies (now Indonesia), and then to Dutch New Guinea. On her return voyages to the Netherlands, Cranston transported Dutch people that wanted to depart the former Dutch East Indies and return to the Netherlands. In 1951 she was rebuilt and converted to a 9,178 GRT emigrant passenger ship and renamed Zuiderkruis. Emigrant passengers migrated to the United States, Canada, Australia and New Zealand. When rebuilt a new deck was added and the bridge raised up and placed forward. The accommodations were improved and she could now carry up to 830 passengers.

In 1960 the ship was rebuilt again to a 9,376 GRT passenger ship. In 1963 the ship was turned over to the Royal Netherlands Navy as an accommodation and store ship at Den Helder in North Holland, the northernmost point of the North Holland peninsula, the country's main naval base. In 1969 she was scrapped in Bilbao, Spain. The Netherlands Government also purchased Costa Rica Victory, renaming it the Groote Beer, and La Grande Victory, renaming it Waterman, for the same emigrant passengers to use.

== See also ==
- List of Victory ships
- Liberty ship
- Type C1 ship
- Type C2 ship
- Type C3 ship

== Sources ==
- Sawyer, L.A. and W.H. Mitchell. Victory ships and tankers: The history of the ‘Victory type" cargo ships and of the tankers built in the United States of America during World War II, Cornell Maritime Press, 1974, 0-87033-182-5.
- United States Maritime Commission:
- Victory Cargo Ships
