= SS Groote Beer =

Victory ship of the United States

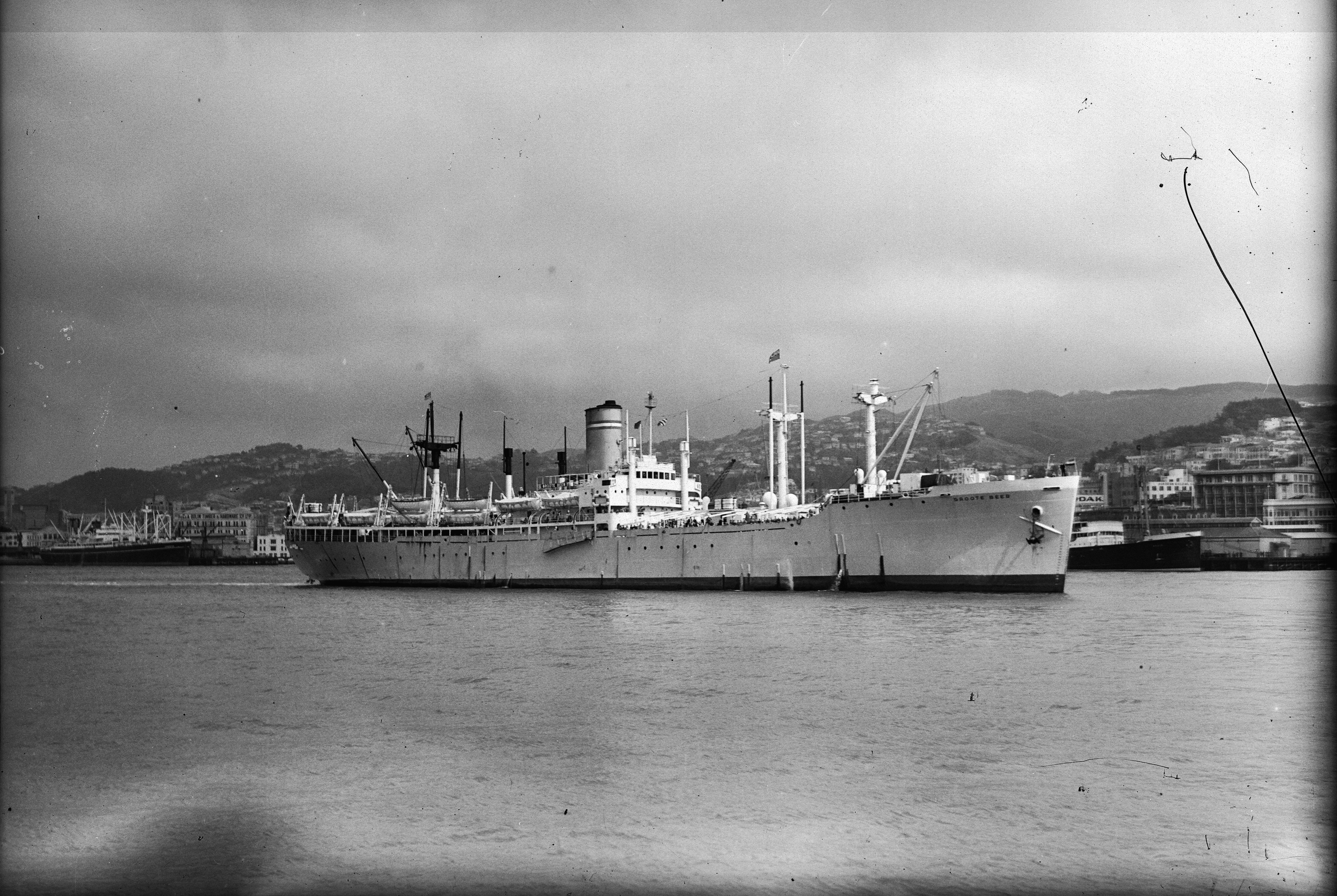
- Groote Beer in New Zealand, c. 1950s

History

United States
- Name: Costa Rica Victory
- Namesake: Republic of Costa Rica
- Builder: Permanente No. 1 yard, Richmond, California
- Laid down: 22 March 1944
- Launched: 17 June 1944
- Completed: 21 August 1944
- Fate: Sold to the Netherlands, 1947

Netherlands
- Name: Groote Beer
- Owner: Holland America Line
- Operator: Dutch Government; Holland America Line
- Acquired: 19 February 1947
- Commissioned: 1947
- Decommissioned: 1966
- Renamed: Marianna IV
- Reclassified: emigrant passenger ship, 1952
- Fate: Sold to John Spyridon Latsis, later Scrapped in 1971

General characteristics (as constructed)
- Type: Victory ship
- Tonnage: 7,200 GRT; 4,300 NRT; 10,600 long tons (10,770 t) deadweight
- Displacement: 15,200 long tons (15,444 t) (at 28-foot draft)
- Length: 455 ft (139 m)
- Beam: 62 ft (19 m)
- Draft: 28 ft (8.5 m)
- Depth of hold: 38 ft (12 m)
- Speed: 17 knots (31 km/h; 20 mph)
- Capacity: 800 passengers (1952-71)

Groote Beer, originally the Victory ship Costa Rica Victory, was laid down on 22 March 1944, at the Permanente No. 1 yard at Richmond, California, and launched on 17 June 1944.

== Costa Rica Victory ==
Costa Rica Victory was used as troopship near the end of World War II operated by the American-Hawaiian Steamship Company. The ship's United States Maritime Commission designation was VC2-S-AP3, hull number P No. 1 (1019), Victory #529. The Maritime Commission turned her over to a civilian contractor for operation. Victory ships were designed to replace the earlier Liberty Ships. Liberty ships were designed to be used just for WW2. Victory ships were designed to last longer and serve the US Navy after the war. The Victory ship differed from a Liberty ship in that they were: faster, longer and wider, taller, with a thinner stack set farther toward the superstructure and had a long raised forecastle. Costa Rica Victory and 96 other Victory ships were converted to troop ships to bring the US soldiers home as part of Operation Magic Carpet. These ships have accommodation for up to 1,600 troops, with fully ventilated and heated rooms. Many had troop warm bunks, a hospital, galleys, washrooms and public rooms. Costa Rica Victory duties were short-lived as the war came to an end. On 17 May 1945, the work started to convert Costa Rica Victory to a troopship. On 11 February 1945, Costa Rica Victor arrived in New York from Europe, with troops. On 13 July 1945, she departed Le Havre, France, for New York, with troops including the 13th Airborne Division. On 27 September 1945, she departed Southampton, England, and arrived 5 October 1945, in New York. Another trip was from Marseille, France, to New York, through the Straits of Gibraltar.

== Groote Beer ==
Costa Rica Victory was sold for $1,005,431, to the Netherlands Government (nl) on 19 February 1947. She was used as a Dutch emigrant ship after World War II. The ship was rebuilt in 1952, to accommodate approximately 800 passengers in a single class, with large dormitories outnumbering conventional cabins. Groote Beer made regular stops at Halifax's Pier 21 in Nova Scotia, Canada, between 1948 and 1961. Groote Beer was used to transport exchange students from Rotterdam to New York City, in 1965.

Groote Beer averaged 13 voyages to North America during her years of service as an emigrant ship. Voyages were also made to Australia, New Zealand and South Africa. In 1960, Groote Beer was transferred to the Trans-Ocean Steamship Co and in 1963, was sold to John Spyridon Latsis, Greece, and renamed the Marianna IV.

Marianna IV continued in service until July 1966, when it collided with the sand dredger Pen Avon off the Isle of Wight, while leaving Southampton, on a voyage to New York. The voyage was cancelled and the ship went to Piraeus, where she was laid up and finally scrapped in June 1970, at Eleusis, Greece.
