= Hayari Miyake =

Japanese surgeon (1866–1945)

- 三宅 速
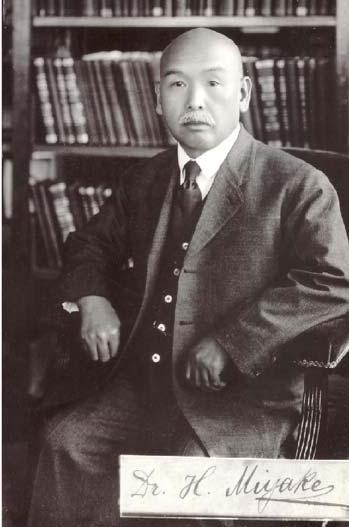
- Miyake, c. 1910
- Born: 16 March 1866; Anabuki, Awa Province, Tokushima Domain (now Anabuki, Tokushima), Japan
- Died: 29 June 1945 (aged 79); Okayama, Empire of Japan
- Education: Doctor of medicine
- Alma mater: Tokyo Imperial University
- Children: Hiroshi Miyake

Japanese name
- Kanji: 三宅 速
- Kana: みやけ はやり
Transcriptions
- Romanization: Miyake Hayari

Hayari Miyake (Japanese: 三宅 速, romanized: Miyake Hayari; 16 March 1866 – 29 June 1945) was a Japanese surgeon specializing in gastrointestinal and central nervous system surgeries. He was an assistant to Julius Scriba, a professor of surgery at Tokyo Imperial University, and later became a student of Jan Mikulicz-Radecki, a German-Polish-Austrian surgeon. Miyake headed the Department of Surgery at Kyushu Medical School, where he taught Hakaru Hashimoto, the discoverer of Hashimoto's thyroiditis. Miyake served as the president of the Japan Surgical Society and was a long-time friend of theoretical physicist Albert Einstein.

== Life ==
=== Youth ===
Hayari Miyake was born on 16 March 1866 in Anabuki, Tokushima Prefecture, on Shikoku island. He was the eldest son of doctors Gentatsu and Tomo Miyake. The Miyake family had a medical tradition spanning nearly ten generations. At the age of 12, Hayari Miyake moved to Tokyo under the care of his cousin and received his basic education there. He studied at the School of Foreign Languages and then completed a preparatory course for Tokyo Imperial University (present-day University of Tokyo), subsequently enrolling in the university's medical department. He graduated with the highest honors in his class in 1891. He became an assistant to Julius Scriba, a professor of surgery at Tokyo Imperial University, known for performing Japan's first craniotomy. Miyake described this case of a patient with a fracture of the left temporal bone and right-sided hemiparesis, who improved after the removal of the inwardly displaced skull fragments, in the Tokyo Medical Journal in 1893.

=== Studies in Europe ===
Miyake then returned to his hometown and opened a surgical practice in Tokushima. Dissatisfied with the state of medical services in the city, he decided to pursue further studies in Germany, like many other Japanese doctors of the time. In 1898, he arrived in Berlin. Hearing about the scientific achievements of German-Polish-Austrian surgeon Jan Mikulicz-Radecki, who was a student of Theodor Billroth, he decided to travel to Wrocław by train to seek collaboration. He was accepted into the clinic almost immediately. In 1901, Miyake earned his medical doctorate. He was one of Mikulicz's favorite students. When his two-year internship ended, Mikulicz offered him a position at the clinic. According to Mikulicz's wife, "he loved Miyake as his own son". However, Miyake's father requested his return to Japan, so he did not accept Mikulicz's offer. Mikulicz gave him a very favorable letter of recommendation. Shortly afterward, in 1904, Miyake returned to Mikulicz's clinic, spending nearly four years in total in Wrocław.

Shortly after Miyake left, Professor Mikulicz died of stomach cancer, having diagnosed himself with the incurable disease. Miyake learned of his teacher's death from an obituary in the Schlesische Zeitung on 16 June 1905. In 1908, three years after the funeral, Henriette von Mikulicz-Radecki gave Miyake her husband's death mask, his portrait by Läwen, and manuscripts. After the war, Miyake's son, Hiroshi, found the mask and made several copies, sending the original by diplomatic mail to Mikulicz's grandson, F. Anschütz. In a letter dated 27 April 1976, Hiroshi wrote that the mask copies were given to surgical clinics in Japan to be kept "as a memento of the father of our surgery". In 2002, one of the copies was presented to the Surgical Clinic of the Medical Academy in Wrocław by Professor Miyake's great-granddaughter, Sumiko Hiki.

=== Career in Japan ===
In 1904, Miyake returned to Japan, where he headed the Department of Surgery at Kyushu Medical School (now the Department of Surgery at Kyushu University). In 1913, he became president of the Japan Surgical Society (founded in 1901) and was re-elected in 1926.

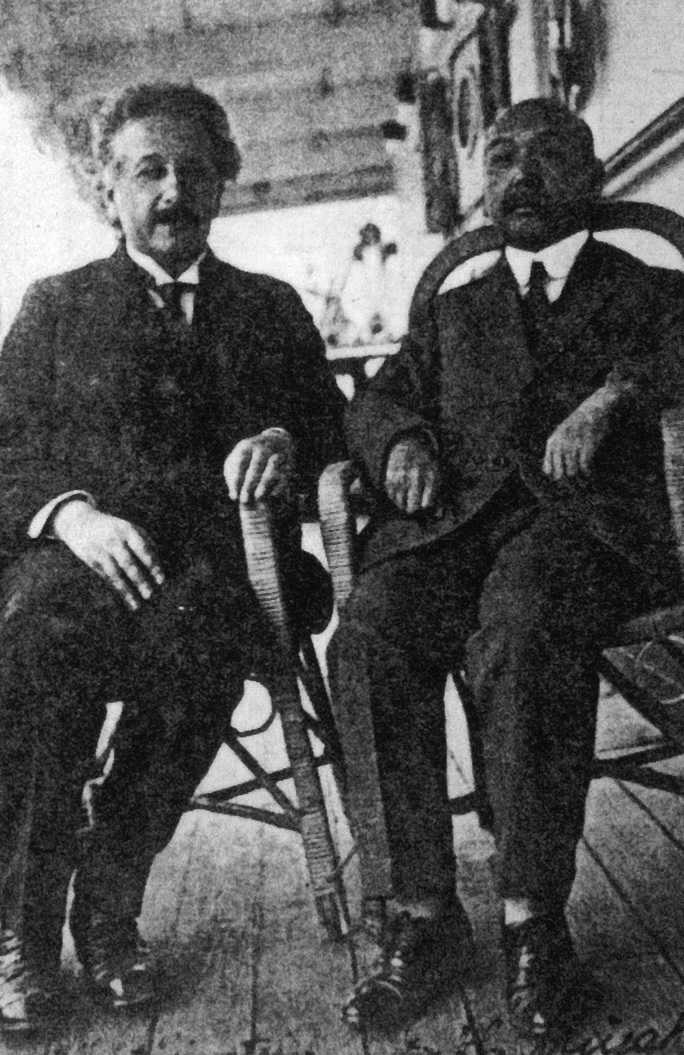
Albert Einstein (left) and Miyake on a trip from Marseille to Japan in 1922

In October 1922, on his return voyage to Japan after his third visit to Europe, Miyake met theoretical physicist Albert Einstein. During the trip, Einstein suffered from bloody diarrhea and fever, and his wife, Elsa, asked Miyake for help. Miyake reassured the worried Einstein, who feared a possible cancer, and quickly cured him of a tropical fever with medication. Einstein and Miyake became friends. When their ship arrived in Kobe, Einstein promised to visit the surgeon at his home in Fukuoka. He fulfilled this promise on 25 December of the same year. During the visit, Einstein played the piano brought by Miyake from Vienna. The scholars also corresponded with each other.

Miyake was the chairman of the Japanese branch of the International Society of Surgery (now International Society of Surgery), founded by Emil Theodor Kocher in 1901. In 1918, the society decided to exclude Austria and Germany because both countries were responsible for the outbreak of World War I. Miyake disagreed with the boycott of surgeons based on nationality and made efforts to reinstate delegates from these countries in the organization. To this end, he visited surgical clinics in Europe and America, collecting signatures for a petition to change the society's decision. He obtained support from, among others, the Mayo brothers (William James and Charles Horace) from the clinic in Rochester, Evarts Ambrose Graham from St. Louis, and Harvey Cushing from Boston. On 10 September, he received a telegram from ISS/SIC informing him that his petition had been positively reviewed.

In 1925, during the 7th International Convention of Surgeons in Rome, Miyake paid a return visit to Einstein. Eight years later, Einstein left Europe and moved to the United States, losing contact with his Japanese friend.

In 1927, Miyake, Kitasato Shibasaburō, and other Japanese doctors became members of the German National Academy of Sciences Leopoldina (Deutsche Akademie der Naturforscher Leopoldina). In 1928, Miyake was recommended by Ferdinand Sauerbruch, a former colleague from the clinic in Wrocław, for a position on the editorial board of the German journal Deutsche Zeitschrift für Chirurgie. Miyake maintained contact with other staff from Mikulicz's clinic and with his family.

In 1931, Hiroshi Miyake (1901–1993), the son of Hayari Miyake, began his studies abroad with Willy Anschütz.

=== Last years and death ===
In 1935, Hayari Miyake retired and settled in Ashiya, Kobe. When allied bombing began to threaten the family, his son Hiroshi decided to flee from Ashiya to Tottori and in May 1945 took his parents to his home in Okayama. On the night of 29 June, two days before the planned departure to Tottori, Hayari Miyake and his wife Miho were killed during the American carpet bombing of Okayama.

After the war ended, Hiroshi Miyake informed Albert Einstein (residing in Princeton) about the death of his parents. Einstein responded with condolences in German and English. The Miyake family commemorated his words as an epitaph on their tombstone, located in Tokushima:

Here rest Dr. Hayari Miyake and his wife Miho Miyake.
Together they worked for the good of humanity, and together they departed as victims of its aberrations.

== Memoir ==
Miyake kept a diary in which he described, among other things, his impressions from his visit to the Mikulicz household. Professor Mikulicz had a tradition of inviting his new assistant for dinner at his home (a similar visit was made by Mikulicz in 1875 at Billroth's home). Shortly after arriving in Wrocław, Miyake was also invited to the residence on Auenstraße (now Mikulicz-Radecki Street). Although Miyake had a good command of the German language, he felt less confident in adhering to Western manners, to which he had not yet accustomed himself. During the dinner, the professor's wife asked him if he knew anything about Phoenicia. The professor whispered to her not to ask such questions of a man from the Far East. However, Miyake, whose favorite subject in school had been world history, showcased his knowledge about Phoenicia. Allegedly, from that evening onwards, he earned the sympathy of both Jan and Henriette Mikulicz.

Professor Mikulicz highly regarded the manual skills of the Japanese surgery apprentice. Miyake recorded the professor's words in his diary: "You can operate equally well with both your right and left hands".

== Scientific contributions ==
Miyake specialized mainly in gastrointestinal surgery and central nervous system surgery. In 1928, together with his students J. Miyagi and K. Taniguchi, he wrote a monograph on gastric cancer, based on 23 years of his clinical experience. During this period, Miyake operated on 1,670 patients with this type of cancer. In 1905, at Kyushu, Miyake became the first Japanese surgeon to perform a brain tumor resection; the tumor in a 27-year-old man, located near the left central sulcus and causing Jacksonian epilepsy, was described as a glioma, but it was likely a meningioma. After the operation, the patient had a slight paresis and hypoesthesia of the right lower limb but was able to walk.

In 1906, Miyake operated on a four-year-old boy with a fracture of the left temporal bone, causing crossed aphasia (i.e., motor aphasia in a left-handed patient). The surgery was successful, and the patient regained speech. In 1908, he performed another extirpation, this time of a brain gumma. Both cases were described in an article in Langenbeck's Archives of Surgery by Bernhard von Langenbeck. In 1911, he performed the first schwannoma resection in Japan, located in the right posterior cord of the spinal cord at the C_{5}-C_{6} level.

In 1912, Miyake's student, Hakaru Hashimoto, presented the description of the disease now known as Hashimoto's thyroiditis. This discovery was made during his four-year work at the Kyushu clinic. It was noted that Hashimoto compared certain features of the disease with the one discovered by Mikulicz, formerly known as Mikulicz's disease, and now usually considered a form of Sjögren syndrome.

== Selected works ==
Note: (Note: Unless otherwise noted, Hayari Miyake is the sole author.)

- "Über die Rattenbißkrankheit". Mitteilungen aus den Grenzgebieten der Medizin und Chirurgie (in German). 5: 231–262. 1900.
- "Zur experimentellen Erzeugung der Gallensteine mit besonderer Berücksichtigung des bakteriellen Verhaltens der Gallenwege". Mitteilungen aus den Grenzgebieten der Medizin und Chirurgie (in German). 6: 479–528. 1900.
- "Removal of "glioma" in the left motor cortex". Nihon Gekagakkai Zasshi (in Japanese). 7: 243–260. 1907.
- Miyake, Hayari; Miyagi, J.; Taniguchi, K. (1908). Gastric cancer (in Japanese). Tokyo: Kokuseidou.
- "Morphologische und klinische Beiträge zur Filaria Bancrofti". Zeitschrift für Hygiene und Infektionskrankheiten (in German). 59 (1): 351–361. 1908.
- "Zur Exstirpation der Gehirntumoren in den motorischen Rindenzentren". Archiv für klinische Chirurgie (in German). 88: 811–833. 1909.
- "Statistische, klinische und chemische Studien zur Aetiologie der Gassensteine mit berücksichtigung der japanischen und deutschen Verhältnisse". Langenbecks Archiv für Klinische Chirurgie (in German). 101: 54. 1913.
- "Statistische, klinische und chemische Studien zur Aetiologie der Gassensteine mit berücksichtigung der japanischen und deutschen Verhältnisse". Langenbecks Archiv für Klinische Chirurgie (in German). 101: 54. 1913.
- Miyake, H.; Murayama, C. (1931). "Beiträge zur bakteriologie bei cholelithiasis, sowie zu den histologischen veränderungen der leber bei derselben". Deutsche Zeitschrift für Chirurgie (in German). 233 (8): 634–640. doi:10.1007/BF02793887.
- Miyake, H.; Ishiyama, F. (1930). "Statistische und klinische Studien auf Grund von 754 Fällen von Cholelithiasisoperationen bei Japanern". Deutsche Zeitschrift für Chirurgie (in German). 225 (1): 187–214. doi:10.1007/BF02794999.
- Miyake, Hirosch (1936). "VerÄnderungen des intramuralen nervenapparates bei chirurgischen magenkrankheiten". Deutsche Zeitschrift für Chirurgie (in German). 247 (5–6): 329–356. doi:10.1007/BF02811032.
- Miyake, Hiroshi; Oda, Mitio (1938). "Über die klinische bedeutung des ileumdivertikels, mit besonderer berücksichtigung der pathologie des intramuralen nervengeflechts". Deutsche Zeitschrift für Chirurgie (in German). 251 (1–2): 111–119. doi:10.1007/BF02796889.
