= Georg Albert Lücke =

German surgeon (1829–1894)

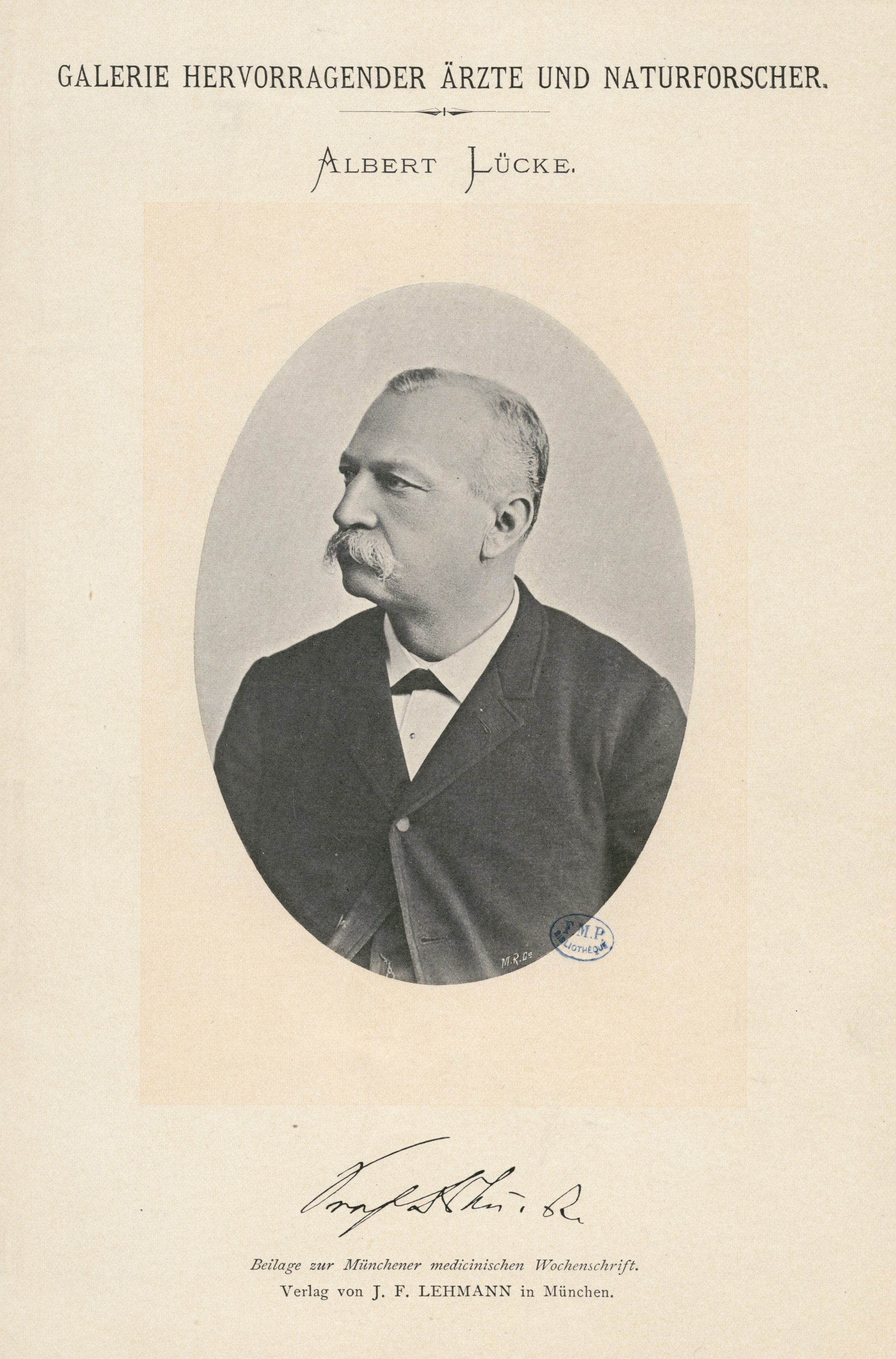
Georg Albert Lücke

Georg Albert Lücke (4 June 1829 – 20 February 1894) was a German surgeon born in Magdeburg.

He studied medicine at the Universities of Heidelberg, Göttingen and Halle, and following graduation traveled abroad to France, Italy and Algeria. After his return to Germany, he served as an assistant to Ernst Blasius (1802–1875) at Halle. In 1860 he became an assistant to Bernhard von Langenbeck (1810–1887) in Berlin, and from 1865 to 1872, he was a professor of surgery at the University of Bern. In 1872 he attained a similar position at the University of Strassburg.

As a result of battle-related surgical experience during the Second Schleswig War, he published Kriegschirurgische aphorismen. During the Franco-Prussian War, he was in charge of a hospital at Darmstadt, publishing Kriegschirurgische Fragen und Bemerkungen as a result.

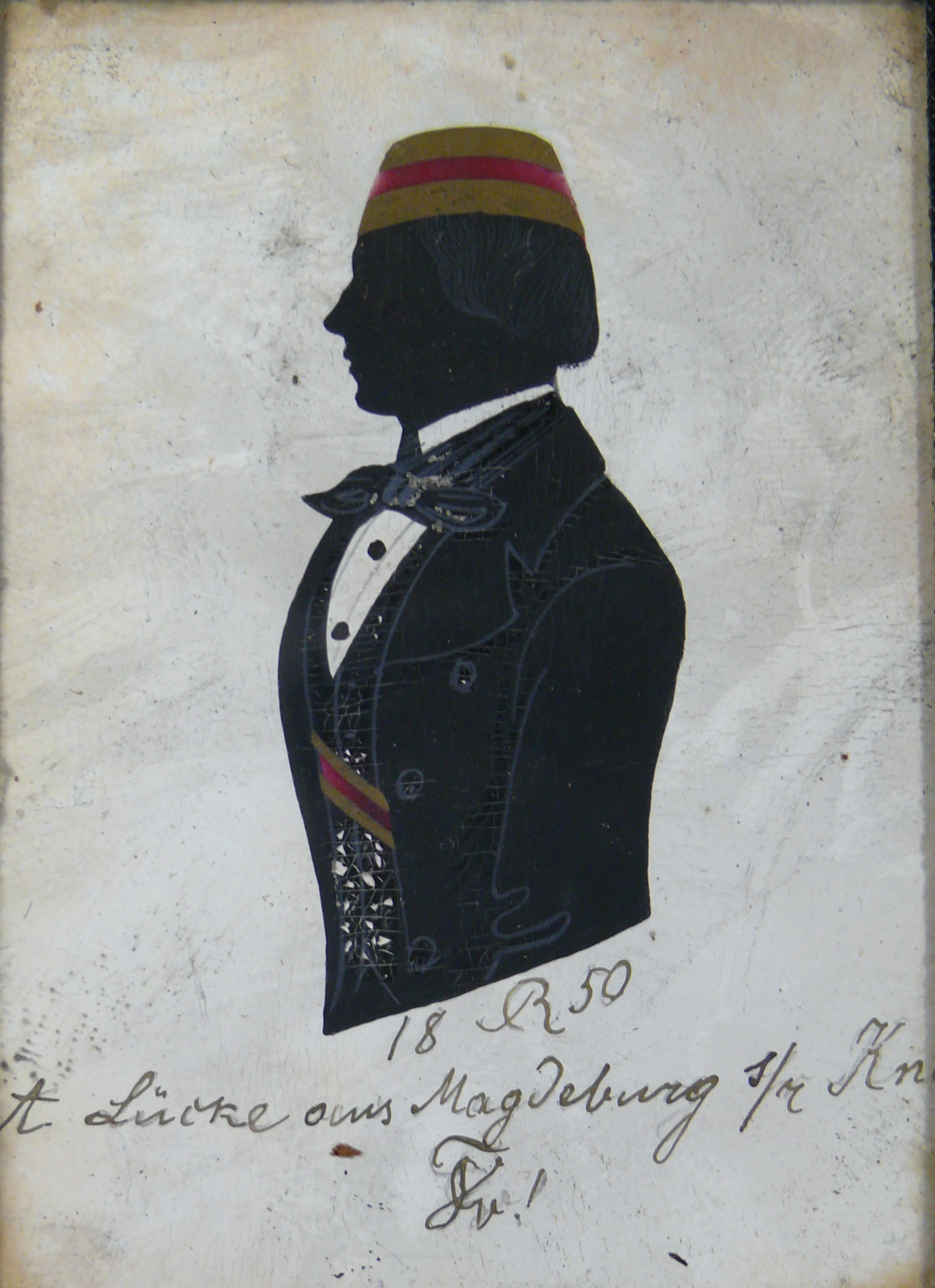
Silhouette of Lücke as active Corps Vandalia Heidelberg, 1850

Lücke was a prodigious writer who published articles on many aspects of medicine and surgery. Some of his better known writings were on battle-related surgery, diseases of the thyroid gland, and papers involving various tumors. With Carl Hueter (1838–1882), he was co-founder of the journal Deutsche Zeitschrift für Chirurgie (1872). With Theodor Billroth (1829–1894), he was co-author of Deutsche Chirurgie, an undertaking begun in 1879 that comprised 66 parts.
