= Hermann Lossen =

German surgeon (1842–1909)

Hermann Friedrich Lossen
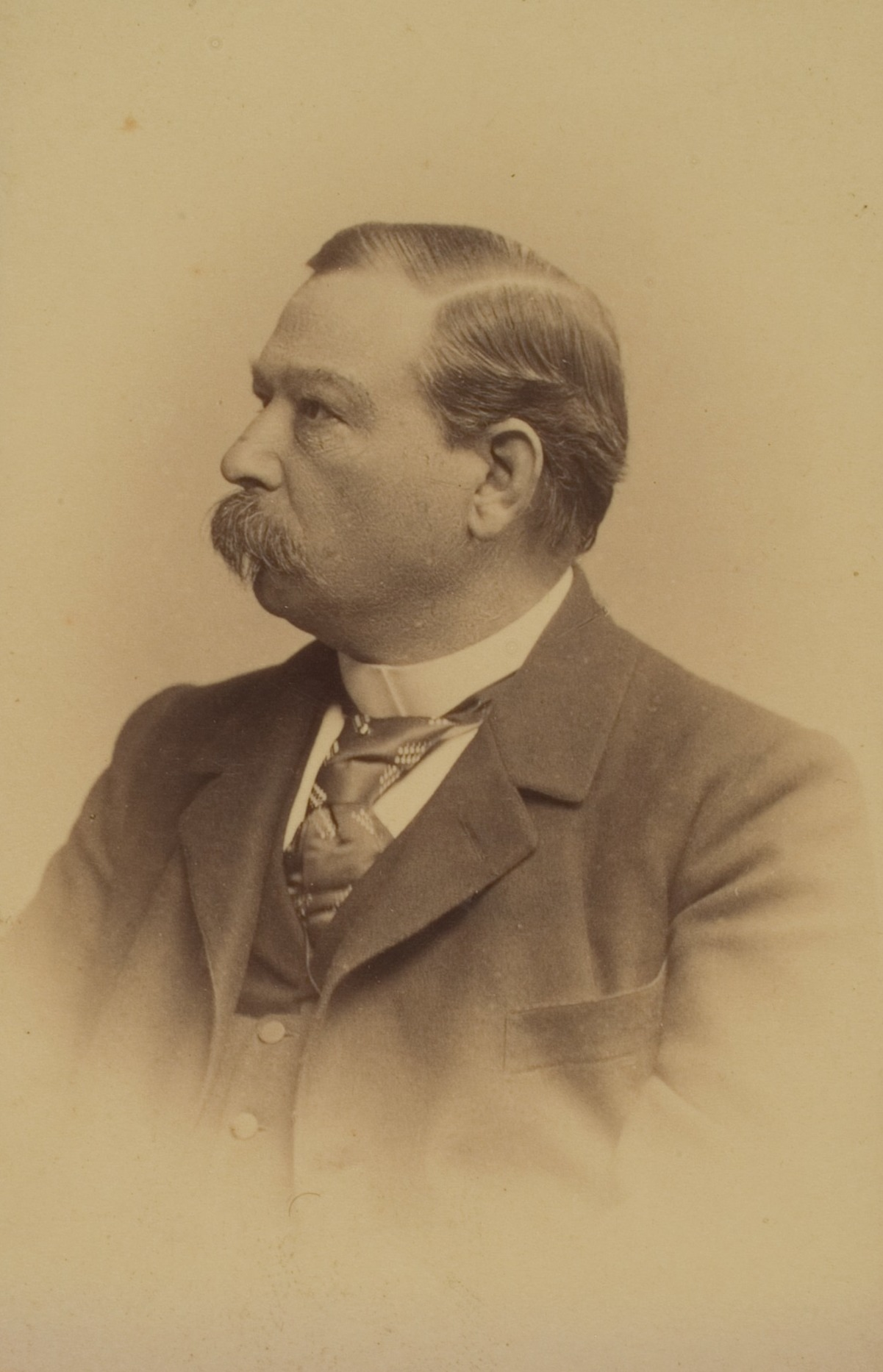
- Born: 7 November 1842
- Died: 27 August 1909 (aged 66)
- Occupation: surgeon

Hermann Friedrich Lossen (7 November 1842 – 27 August 1909) was a German surgeon born in Emmershäuser Hütte, Hesse.

He studied under Carl von Voit (Munich), Friedrich Daniel von Recklinghausen (Würzburg), Bernhard von Langenbeck (Berlin) and Theodor Billroth (Vienna), earning his medical doctorate in 1866 from the University of Würzburg. In addition he served as an assistant to Richard von Volkmann at the University of Halle and to Gustav Simon at the University of Heidelberg. In 1866 he became habilitated for surgery at Heidelberg, where in 1874 he was appointed associate professor.

== Written works ==
Lossen was author of a revision of Carl Hueter's Grundriss der Chirurgie (Outline of surgery), which was subsequently published over several editions (7th edition issued as Lehrbuch der allgemeinen und speciellen Chirurgie). Other noted works by Lossen include:

- Über den Einfluss der Athembewegungen auf die Ausscheidung der Kohlensäure (1866) - On the influence of the respiratory movements on the excretion of carbonic acid.
- Die Verletzungen der unteren Extremitäten (1880)
- Allgemeines über Resectionen (1882) - General surgery involving resections.
- Die Resectionen der Knochen und Gelenke (1894) - Resections of bones and joints.
- Grundriss der Frakturen und Luxationen (1897) - Outline of fractures and luxations.
- Ueber das primäre Carcinom und Sarkom der Vagina (1902). Doctoral thesis.
