= Walter Hermann von Heineke =

German surgeon (1834–1901)

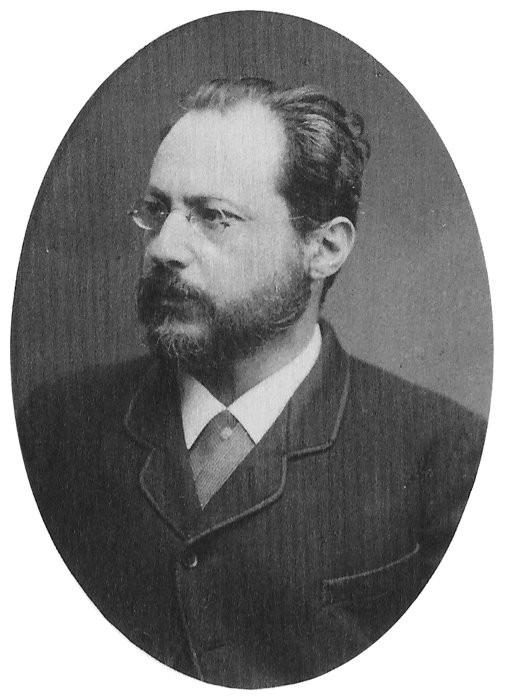
Walter Hermann von Heineke (1834-1901)

Walter Hermann von Heineke (17 May 1834, in Schönebeck – 28 April 1901, in Erlangen) was a German surgeon. He was the son of physician Karl Friedrich Heineke (1798–1857).

He studied at the Universities of Göttingen, Berlin, Leipzig and Greifswald, where he was a student and assistant to Heinrich Adolf von Bardeleben (1819–1895). At Greifswald he obtained his doctorate in 1858 and his habilitation for surgery in 1863. From 1867 to 1901 he was a professor of surgery at the University of Erlangen.

With Polish surgeon Jan Mikulicz-Radecki (1850–1905), the eponymous "Heineke-Mikulicz pyloroplasty" is named, which is a surgical procedure that involves enlargement of the pyloric stricture.

== Written works ==
Heineke was the author of Compendium der Operations- und Verbandlehre (Compendium of operations and dressing instruction), a work that was published in three editions (1871, 1874 and 1885). His Chirurgische Krankheiten des Kopfes was included in Pitha and Billroth's "Handbuch der allgemeinen und speciellen Chirurgie" (1873, Volume III-1/1/2). Other noted writings by Heineke are:

- Beiträge zur Kenntnis und Behandlung der Krankheiten des Knies, 1866 - Contributions to the knowledge and treatment of diseases of the knees.
- Anatomie und Pathologie der Schleimbeutel und Sehnenscheiden, 1868 - Anatomy and pathology of the bursa and tendon sheaths.
- Die chirurgischen Krankheiten des Kopfes. Stuttgart, 1882. XLII + 252 pages, in Billroth and Lücke's "Deutsche Chirurgie". - Surgical diseases of the head.
