= Mary Clara Dawes =

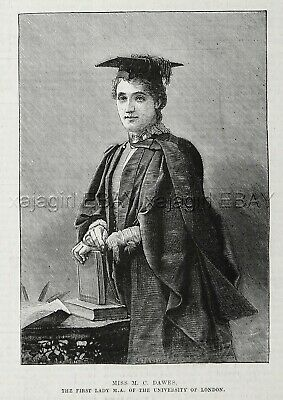
- Miss M. C. Dawes, the First Lady Master of Arts of the University of London; Mary Clara Dawes in full academic dress
- Born: 1862; Surbiton, England
- Died: August 23, 1939 (aged 76–77); Surbiton, England

Academic background
- Education: Girton College Bedford College University of London

Academic work
- Discipline: Classics

Mary Clara Dawes (1862–1939) was the first woman in the United Kingdom to receive a Master of Arts degree, gaining her MA in classics from the University of London in 1884.

== Early life and education ==
Mary Clara Dawes was born in 1862 in Surbiton, the daughter of the Rev. John Samuel Dawes and his wife Anna Sophia Elizabeth Blasius, daughter of the surgeon Ernst Blasius, professor at the University of Halle. She was educated at home by her father, schoolmaster and proprietor of Newton House school. In January 1879 she passed the matriculation examination in Classics at Girton College, Cambridge. In 1882 she passed the Classical Tripos in class III division 1.

Dawes passed the BA examination at the University of London with Honours in 1883, when she came top of the second class, and becoming one of only fifty women at that point to achieve the BA. In the same year she was awarded the 'Professors' Scholarship' by Bedford College, London, who noted this as the first time in "some years" that "a candidate of sufficient merit for this Scholarship [had] presented herself." In 1884 she received her MA, coming fourth in the list of classics, ancient history and modern history students receiving their master's degree that year.

In 1895, Dawes' younger sister Elizabeth Dawes also became a pioneer in women's education, as the first woman to receive a Doctorate (also in Classics) from the University of London.

== Teaching career ==
At the time of her graduation, Dawes was the classics teacher at Maida Vale High School. By 1914 she was running the 'Weybridge Ladies' School' also called Heathlands, in Weybridge, along with her sister. She demonstrated a particular interest in teaching ancient languages through modern pronunciation, translating her sister's book on the subject of teaching ancient Greek into modern Greek, and contributing to debates on the issue among the Classical Association on the pronunciation of ancient languages in contemporary teaching. In 1906 (following a discussion in 1905), a letter written by her was contributed to a debate and then published in the Proceedings of the Classical Association arguing for modern, Italian pronunciation of Latin to be part of classical education. Dawes claimed that this would be closer to the ancient language than the contemporary English approach, and more straightforward to use and teach than a reconstructed philological approach. She was particularly concerned that Latin should be taught not as a 'dead' language. The proposal was not adopted. Dawes remained a life member of the Classical Association. She died in 1939.
