= Carl Hueter =

German surgeon (1838–1882)

Carl Hueter (27 November 1838 – 12 May 1882) was a German surgeon born in Marburg. He was the son of obstetrician Karl Christoph Hueter (1803–1857).

In 1854 began his medical studies in Marburg at the age of 16. Following the state examination in Kassel (1858), he continued his education in Berlin, Vienna, England and Paris. In Paris (1861–1863) he performed research of human joint anatomy. In 1865 he became an assistant to Bernhard von Langenbeck (1810–1887) in Berlin, and in 1868 succeeded surgeon Gustav Simon (1824–1876) at the University of Rostock. In 1870 he was appointed professor of surgery at the University of Greifswald, where in 1877 he was named university rector.

Hueter was the author of a highly regarded work on joint diseases, Klinik der Gelenkkrankheiten mit Einschluss der Orthopädie (1870), and with Strasbourg surgeon Georg Albert Lücke (1829–1894), he was co-founder of the journal Deutsche Zeitschrift für Chirurgie. With Richard von Volkmann (1830–1889), the "Hueter–Volkmann Law" is named, which is an orthopedic rule regarding bone growth which states "that compression forces inhibit growth and tensile forces stimulate growth". Hueter is credited with coining the term "hallux valgus" in 1871 to define lateral deviation of the big toe at the metatarsophalangeal articulation.

== Selected publications ==
- Klinik der Gelenkkrankheiten mit Einschluss der Orthopädie. Auf anatomisch-physiologischen Grundlagen nach klinischen Beobachtungen für Ärzte und Studierende bearbeitet (Clinic of joint diseases including orthopedics); 2 volumes (1870)
- Die allgemeine Chirurgie, eine Einleitung in das Studium der chirurgischen Wissenschaften (1873)
- Grundriss der Chirurgie (Outline of surgery); 2 volumes (1881), later revision and editions by Hermann Lossen (1842–1909).
- Über das Panaritium. seine Folgen und seine Behandlung (On panaritium, its consequences and treatments) In: Sammlung klinischer Vorträge (collection of clinical lectures), edited by Richard von Volkmann.
- Über die chirurgische Behandlung des Wundfiebers bei Schusswunden (On surgical treatment of "wound fever" accompanied with gunshot wounds) In: Sammlung klinischer Vorträge, edited by Richard von Volkmann.
