= Hakaru Hashimoto =

Japanese doctor and medical scientist (1881–1934)

- 橋本 策
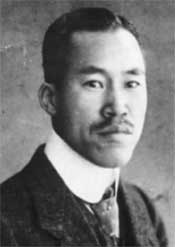
- Hashimoto, unknown date
- Born: May 5, 1881; Iga, Mie Prefecture, Empire of Japan
- Died: January 9, 1934 (aged 52); Iga, Mie, Empire of Japan
- Education: Kyushu University
- Occupation: Physician
- Known for: Hashimoto's thyroiditis
- Title: Doctor
- Spouse: Yoshiko Miyake

Hakaru Hashimoto (橋本 策, Hashimoto Hakaru; May 5, 1881 – January 9, 1934) was a Japanese doctor and medical scientist of the Meiji and Taishō periods. He is best known for publishing the first description of the disease that was later named Hashimoto's thyroiditis.

== Biography ==
Hashimoto was born on 5 May 1881, in the village of Iga-cho, son of Kennosuke Hashimoto, a physician. Hashimoto's family traditionally served as physicians to the district's feudal lords for centuries. Hashimoto's grandfather, General Hashimoto, was the most famous physician in the prefecture in his time, after having studied Dutch medicine.

Hashimoto began his primary education in 1886 and entered the Third High School in Kyoto, considered to be at the time a leading pre-university educational establishment. In 1903, he enrolled in Fukuoka Medical College in Fukuoka, a branch of the newly-established Kyushu University. He was amongst the first medical graduates when he graduated in 1907. He then entered the First Surgical Bureau and studied medicine under the direction of Hayari Miyake (1867–1945), the first Japanese neurosurgeon. While working on his M.D. thesis, he examined four histology samples from surgically excised thyroids and described his findings as 'struma lymphomatosa'. He published his findings in the German journal Archiv für Klinische Chirurgie as German was considered the lingua franca of academia during this time. Hashimoto also published two further papers on erysipelas and on penetrating chest wall injuries.

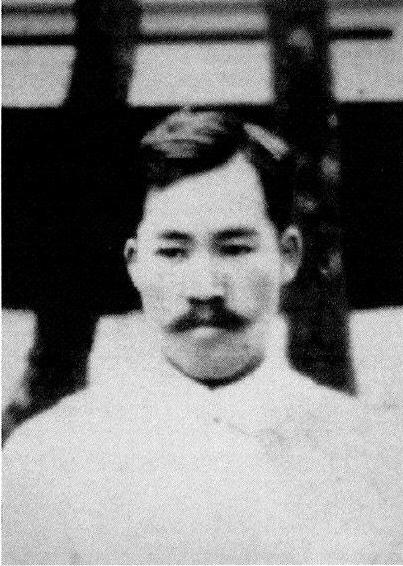
Hashimoto circa 1912

In 1912, Hashimoto traveled to University of Göttingen in Germany to study pathology under the training of Eduard Kaufmann, with particular emphasis on tuberculosis of the urinary tract. In 1915, Hashimoto returned to Japan via England as the First World War was underway. In 1916, he came back to his hometown, Igamachi, and became the town doctor, setting up his own surgical clinic. As a surgeon and general practitioner, Hashimoto would frequently visit patients in their homes, often utilising a rickshaw, regardless of distance. In critical patients, he would perform surgery at their homes with only trained nurses accompanying him. He was also known to not charge fees to his poor patients. During this time, Hashimoto was often seen studying medicine late in the evening and was regarded as a lifelong student.

In December 1933, Hashimoto fell ill with typhoid fever and eventually died at home on 9 January 1934 at the age of 52.

== Scientific activities ==
In 1912, he published a paper, Kōjōsen rinpa-setsu shushō-teki henka ni kansuru kenkyū hōkoku or Zur Kenntnis der lymphomatösen Veränderung der Schilddrüse (Struma lymphomatosa) or (Report on lymphomatous goiter) in "Archiv für klinische Chirurgie", Berlin, 1912:97:219-248.

Years later, this paper was evaluated by English and American researchers, and the disease it described was recognized as an independent illness.

In American medical books, it was named Hashimoto's thyroiditis.

== Personal life ==
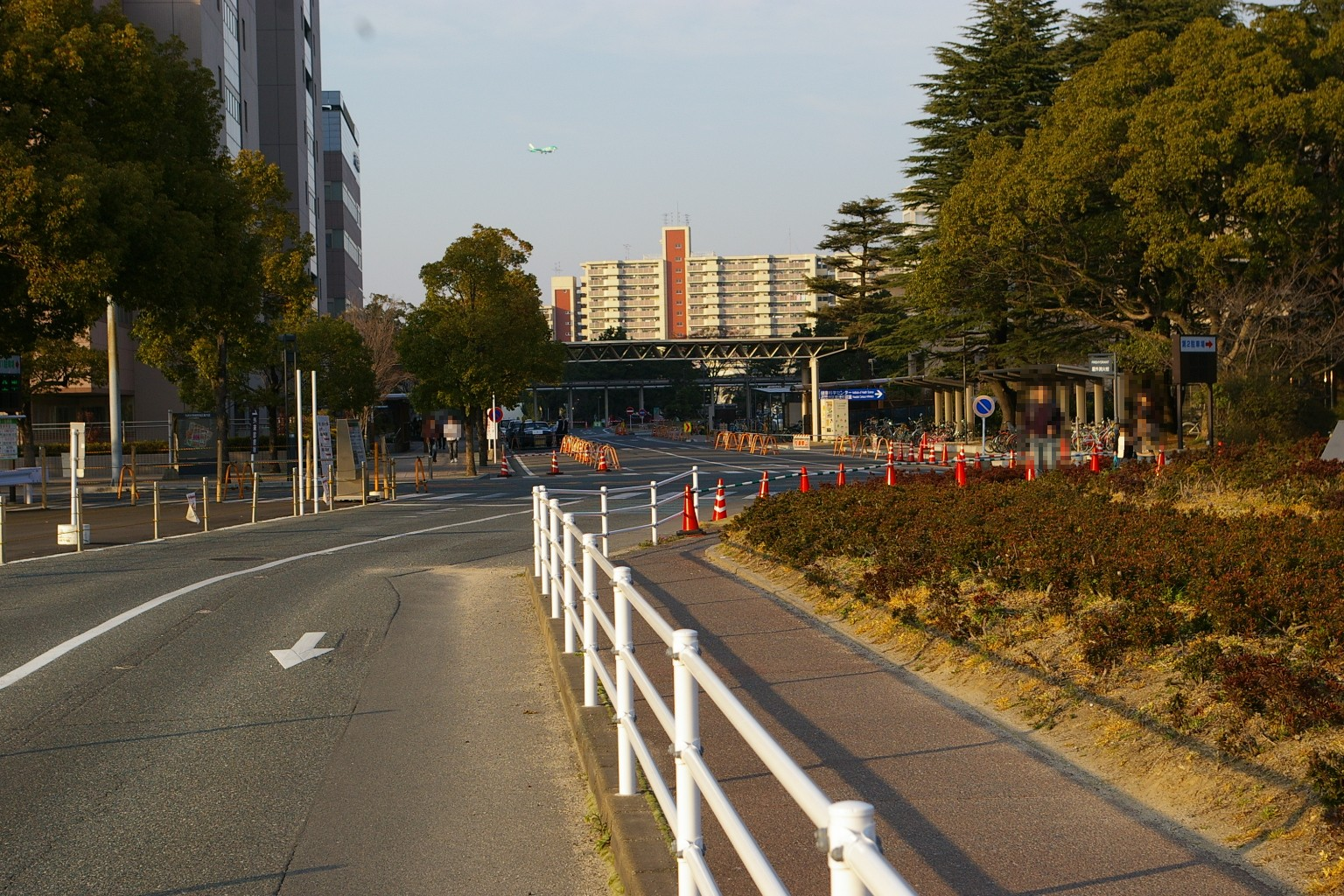
Hashimoto Street

Hashimoto married Yoshiko Miyake, the daughter of a naval doctor who studied Japanese literature at the Nara' Women's Higher College for Education. The couple had four children; one daughter (Hanako) and three sons (Ken'ichi, Haruo, Kazuo). He was a devout Buddhist and was head of the Buddhist association at Kyushu University during his time as a student. On holidays, he was known to frequent Osaka or Kyoto by train and particularly enjoyed Kabuki theatre and foreign book-shopping.

== Hashimoto Street ==
To honor his achievements, Kyushu University named a road on its Maidashi campus "Hashimoto Street".
