= Benno Reinhardt =

German pathologist

Benno Ernst Heinrich Reinhardt (14 May 1819 – 11 March 1852) was a German physician who worked as prosector at Charité hospital in Berlin. He is known for his contributions to pathology, especially as co-founder of the journal Virchows Archiv.

Reinhardt was born in Neustrelitz, as the eighth child of Friedrich and Sophia (née Linecke) Reinhard. His father was a pharmacist. He was educated at the local Gymnasium. From his music class, he excelled in cello and was an acclaimed tenor at school. In 1839 he passed his matriculation and studied medicine at the University of Berlin. He studied under eminent teachers at the time such as Friedrich Gustav Jakob Henle and Johannes Peter Müller. Here he met his senior and future collaborator Rudolf Virchow. He devoted his interest in zoology and botany. He left Berlin for Halle in 1840 to study anatomy and pathology under Meier, Blasius and Krukenberg. In 1843 he returned to Berlin for his last semester. In 1844 he received his doctorate from with a treatise on the symptomatology of peritonitis, De peritonitidis symptomatologia. In 1849 he was appointed as a lecturer, and became an assistant at the Berlin Charité. He eventually succeeded Rudolf Virchow (1821–1902) as prosector of the hospital, the post which he held until his death in 1852, at the age of 32 from tuberculosis of the lung.

Benno Reinhardt specialized in the field of pathological anatomy. In 1847 with Rudolf Virchow, he founded the Archiv für pathologische Anatomie und Physiologie, und für klinische Medizin (Archives for Pathological Anatomy & Physiology & Clinical Medicine), which was later shortened to Virchows Archiv. After Reinhardt's death, his studies on pathological anatomy were compiled and edited by Rudolf Leubuscher (1822–1861).
