= Romeo Seligmann =

Austrian physician

Seligmann, Franz Romeo
- Born: 30 June 1808; Mikulov
- Died: 15 September 1892 (aged 84); Vienna
- Education: University of Vienna
- Occupations: Austrian doctor and medical historian

Abraham Romeo Seligmann better known as Franz Romeo Seligmann (born 30 June 1808 in Nikolsburg, today Mikulov, in Moravia; died 15 September 1892 in Vienna), was an Austrian doctor and medical historian.

== Life ==
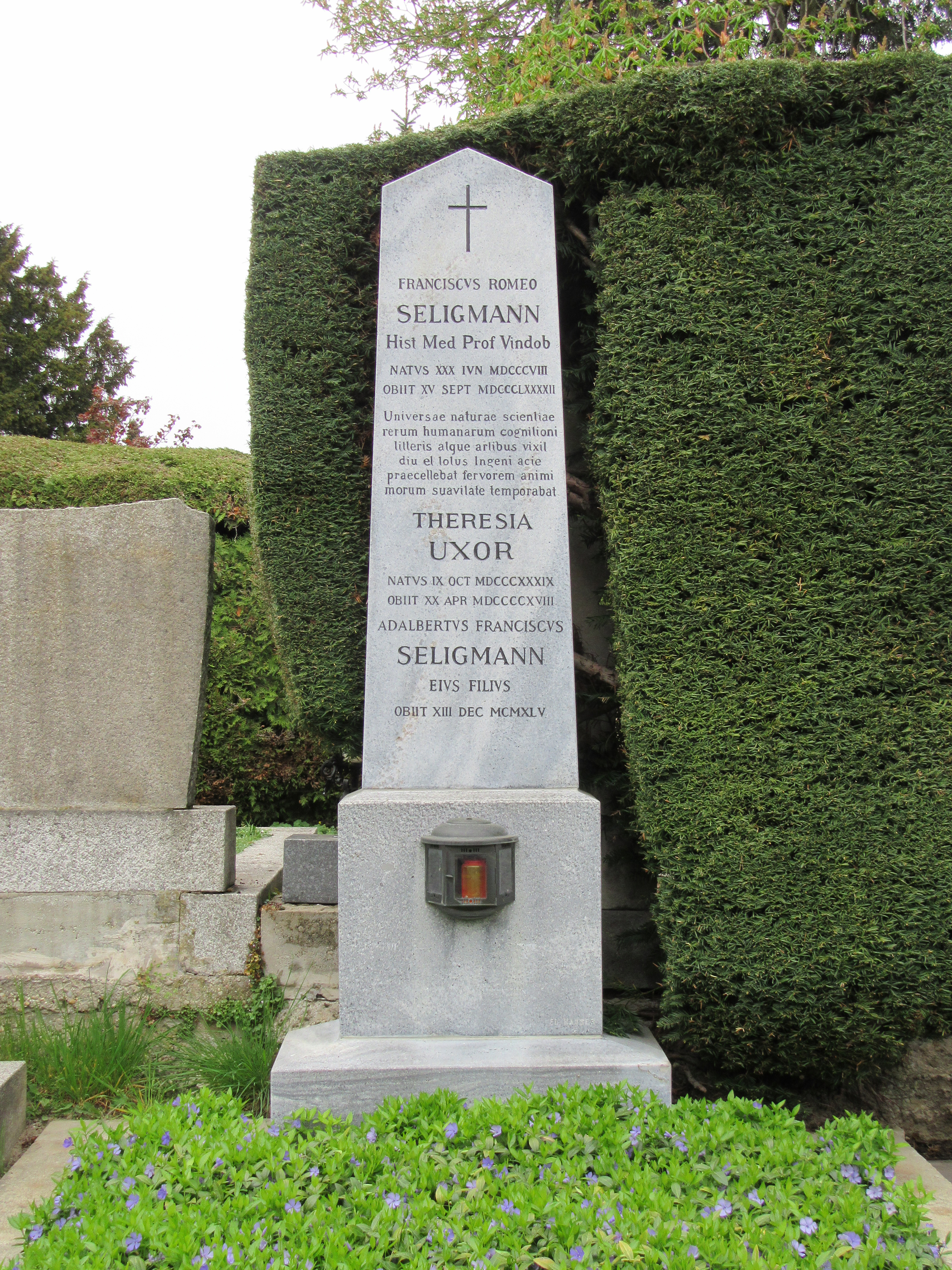
Seligmann family grave at the Döbling Cemetery

Seligmann was born to a Jewish family in Nikolsburg, the son of Dr. Isaak Seligmann. He changed his name from Abraham to Franz upon his conversion to Catholicism. He began his studies at the age of 17 at University of Vienna, where he studied medicine and languages and learned Persian in order to read an old medical manuscript for his dissertation, ("De re medica Persarum", 1830). Later he published an excerpt from the second part of the manuscript: "Liber fundamentorum pharmacologiae auctore Abu Mansur., Epitome etc." (Pars I, II, Vienna 1830, 33), together with a German short version. In 1860 the Vienna k. k. State Printing Facsimile with commentary appear: "Codex Vindobonensis sive medici Abu Mansur ... liber fundamentorum pharmacologiae".

In addition to his work as a medical historian Seligmann worked as a cholera doctor and took up art history studies. Over a five-year period around this time, Seligmann worked as a junior doctor at the General Hospital, while he also moved in an academic circle around Karl von Holtei, Franz Grillparzer, Ludwig August Frankl von Hochwart, Eduard von Bauernfeld, Eduard von Feuchtersleben and Franz von Schober and developed a close relationship with Ottilie von Goethe. In 1869 he became a full professor at the University of Vienna and he also carried out ethnographic examinations (especially on skulls) – at this time phrenology was fashionable and Seligmann had fragments of Beethoven's skull. Seligmann retired in 1879. His only son was the painter Adalbert Seligmann.

== Honors ==
In 1863 he was elected a member of the German Academy of Sciences Leopoldina.

== Literature ==
- D. Angetter: "Seligmann, Franz Romeo (Abraham, Romeo)". In: Österreichisches Biographisches Lexikon 1815–1950 (ÖBL). Vol. 12, Austrian Academy of Sciences, Vienna 2005, ISBN 3-7001-3580-7, p. 154 f. (Direct links to "p. 154", "p. 155")
- Wurzbach, Constantin von (1877). "Seligmann, Romeo (Digitalisat)". Biographisches Lexikon des Kaiserthums Oesterreich. 34. Wien: Kaiserlich-königliche Hof- und Staatsdruckerei: 50–53.
- Muwaffiq ibn ʻAlī al-Harawī (1972), Talbot, C. H. (ed.), Kitāb al-abniyah ʻan ḥaqāʼiq al-adwiyah, Codices selecti phototypice impressi, v. 35., translated by Seligmann, Franz Romeo (English ed.), Graz, Austria: Akademische Druck- und Verlagsanstalt
- Daniela Angetter (2010). "Seligmann, Franz Romeo". Neue Deutsche Biographie (in German). Vol. 24. Berlin: Duncker & Humblot. pp. 221–222. (full text online).
