= Theodor Billroth Operating (painting) =

Painting by Adalbert Seligmann

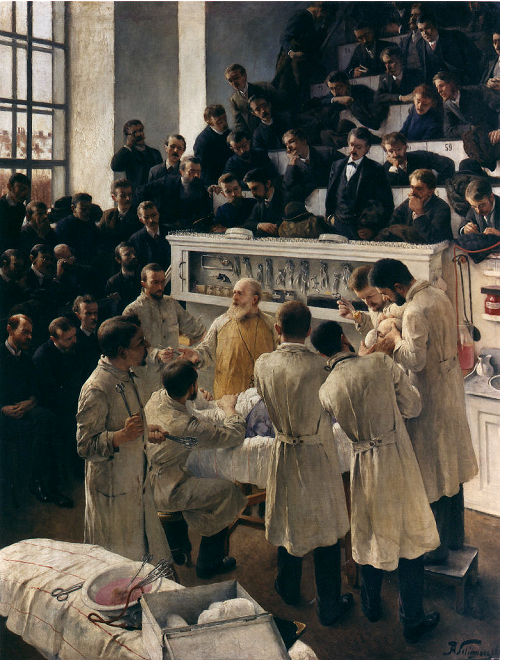
Theodor Billroth Operating by Adalbert Seligmann

The Theodor Billroth Operating painting by Adalbert Seligmann (1890?) shows the German surgeon Theodor Billroth operating in the auditorium of Vienna General Hospital (Allgemeine Krankenhaus), significantly displaying all the participants wearing "white coats". The painting is exhibited in the Österreichische Galerie Belvedere in Vienna, Austria.
