= Konrad Johann Martin Langenbeck =

German surgeon (1776–1851)

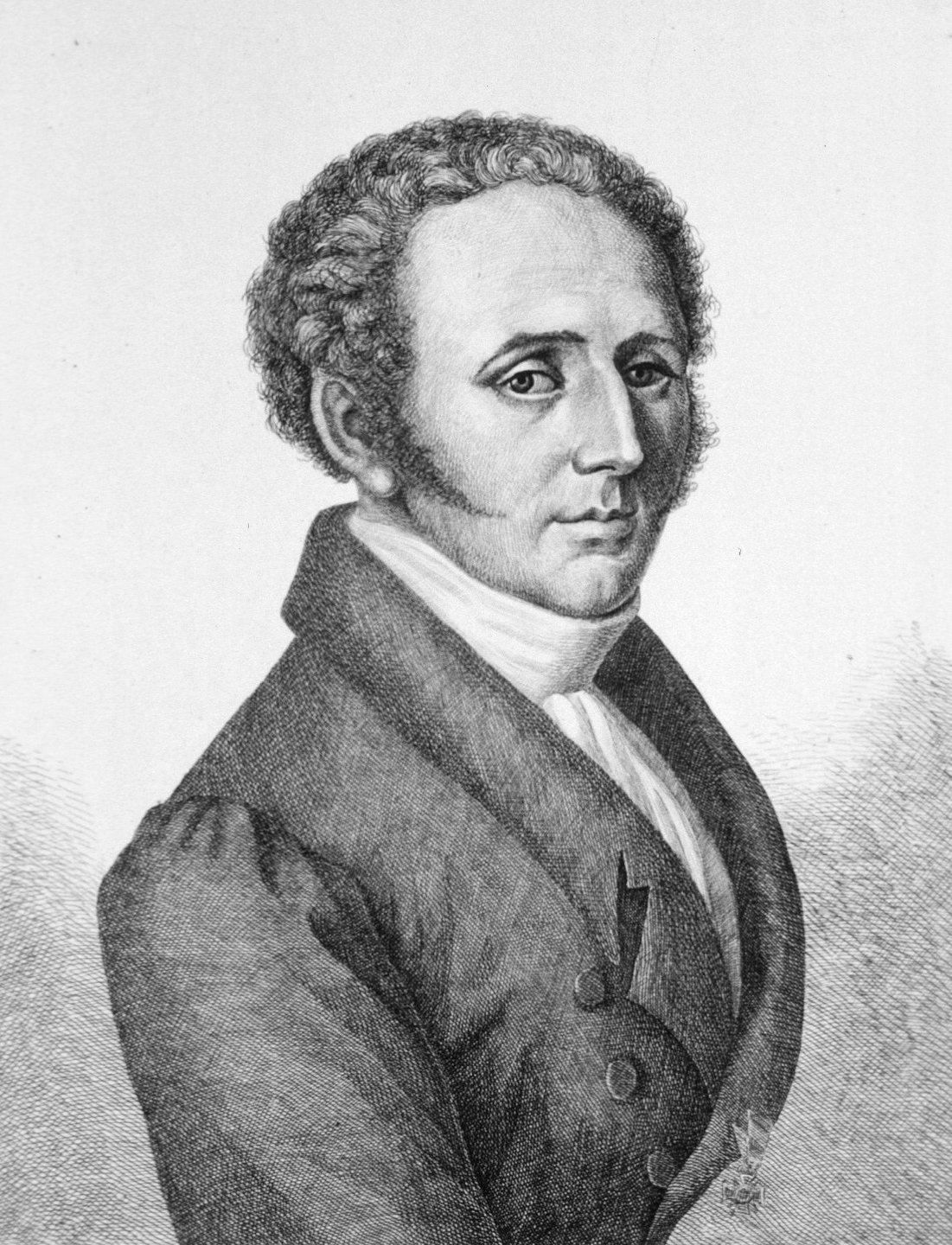
Langenbeck

Konrad Johann Martin Langenbeck (5 December 1776 – 24 January 1851) was a German surgeon, ophthalmologist and anatomist who was a native of Horneburg.

== Biography ==
Langenbeck studied medicine at Friedrich Schiller University in Jena, and in 1802 received his habilitation under August Gottlieb Richter (1742–1812) at the University of Göttingen. In 1804 he became an associate professor, and three years later established his own institute for surgery and ophthalmology. In 1814 he was appointed full professor at Göttingen and general surgeon of the Hannoverian Army.

For nearly fifty years he taught classes at the University of Göttingen, and among his better known students were surgeon Louis Stromeyer (1804–1876) and his nephew Bernhard von Langenbeck (1810–1887). He was considered one of the better surgeons during the first half of the 19th century, known for his speed and precision in performing amputations. After his death, he was succeeded by Friedrich Gustav Jacob Henle (1809–1885) as chair of anatomy at Göttingen. In 1845, he was elected a member of the Royal Swedish Academy of Sciences. He was named a knight of the Royal Guelphic Order.

== Works ==
- Anatomisches Handbuch, 1806.
- Commentarius de Structura peritonaei, Testiculorum Tunicis, 1817.
- Von den Leisten- und Schenkelbrüchen, 1821.
- Nosologie und Therapie der chirurgischen Krankheiten (1822–50, 5 volumes).
- Icones anatomicae (1826–1839, 8 volumes).
- Handbuch der anatomie mit hinweisung auf die Icones anatomicae (1831–1842).
- Mikroskopisch-anatomische Abbildungen (1848–51, 4 books).
- Bibliothek für Chirurgie und Ophthalmologie (1806–13, 4 volumes).
