= Virchows Archiv =

- Discipline: Pathology
- Language: English
- Edited by: Daniela Massi

Publication details
- Former names: Archiv für pathologische Anatomie und Physiologie und für klinische Medicin; Virchows Archiv für pathologische Anatomie und Physiologie und für klinische Medizin
- History: 1847–present
- Publisher: Springer Science+Business Media on behalf of the European Society of Pathology
- Frequency: Monthly
- Impact factor: 2.848 (2016)

Standard abbreviations
- ISO 4: Virchows Arch.

Indexing
- CODEN: VARCEM
- ISSN: 0945-6317 (print); 1432-2307 (web)
- LCCN: 94038299
- OCLC no.: 1645130

Links
- Journal homepage; Online archive

Virchows Archiv: European Journal of Pathology is a monthly peer-reviewed medical journal of all aspects of pathology, especially human pathology. It is published by Springer Science+Business Media and an official publication of the European Society of Pathology. It was established in 1847 by Rudolf Virchow and his friend Benno Reinhardt as the Archiv für pathologische Anatomie und Physiologie und für klinische Medicin. After Virchow's death, it was renamed after him to Virchows Archiv für pathologische Anatomie und Physiologie und für klinische Medizin. The European Society of Pathology adopted it as its official journal in 1999, so that its current name became Virchows Archiv: European Journal of Pathology.

== Origin and history ==
In 1846, Rudolf Virchow earned his medical license, and succeeded Robert Froriep as prosector at the Charité Hospital in Berlin. In 1847 he became "privatdozent". However, he soon found that his technical manuscripts were constantly rejected by medical journals. In protest he established a new journal, then named Archiv für pathologische Anatomie und Physiologie und für klinische Medicin (Archives of Pathological Anatomy and Physiology and of Clinical Medicine), which he edited with his colleague Benno Reinhardt. He declared that the aim of the journal was to unite the branches of clinical medicine, pathological anatomy, and physiology. The first issue was published in February 1847 and contained only four articles – two by Virchow, one by Reinhardt, and one by Rud Leubuscher – and written entirely in German. After Reinhardt's death in 1852, Virchow continued to edit the journal until his own death in 1902.

After Virchow's death, the editors decided to honor him and the journal became Virchows Archiv für pathologische Anatomie und Physiologie und für klinische Medizin in 1903. The first English text appeared in 1960, and from that point onward English articles were frequently included. With the expanding field of pathology, it was decided in 1968 to divide the journal into two sections, namely part A dedicated to Pathologische Anatomie und Histologie and part B for Zellpathologie, later changed into Pathological Anatomy and Histology and Cell Pathology respectively, as the publication became more internationally oriented. Its entire publication language became English by the late 1970s, and the long German name of the journal itself was deleted. In 1994 the sister journals part A and B were merged with a new subtitle An International Journal of Pathology. The European Society of Pathology adopted it as its official journal in 1999. In 2009 the society changed the subtitle to The European Journal of Pathology.

== Abstracting and indexing ==
The journal is abstracted and indexed in the Science Citation Index, PubMed/MEDLINE, Scopus, Embase, Chemical Abstracts Service, EBSCO databases, CSA, CAB International, Academic OneFile, Biological Abstracts, BIOSIS Previews, CAB Abstracts, CSA Environmental Sciences, Current Contents/Life Sciences, and Elsevier Biobase. According to the Journal Citation Reports, the journal has a 2016 impact factor of 2.848.
