= Adalbert Seligmann =

Austrian painter and art critic

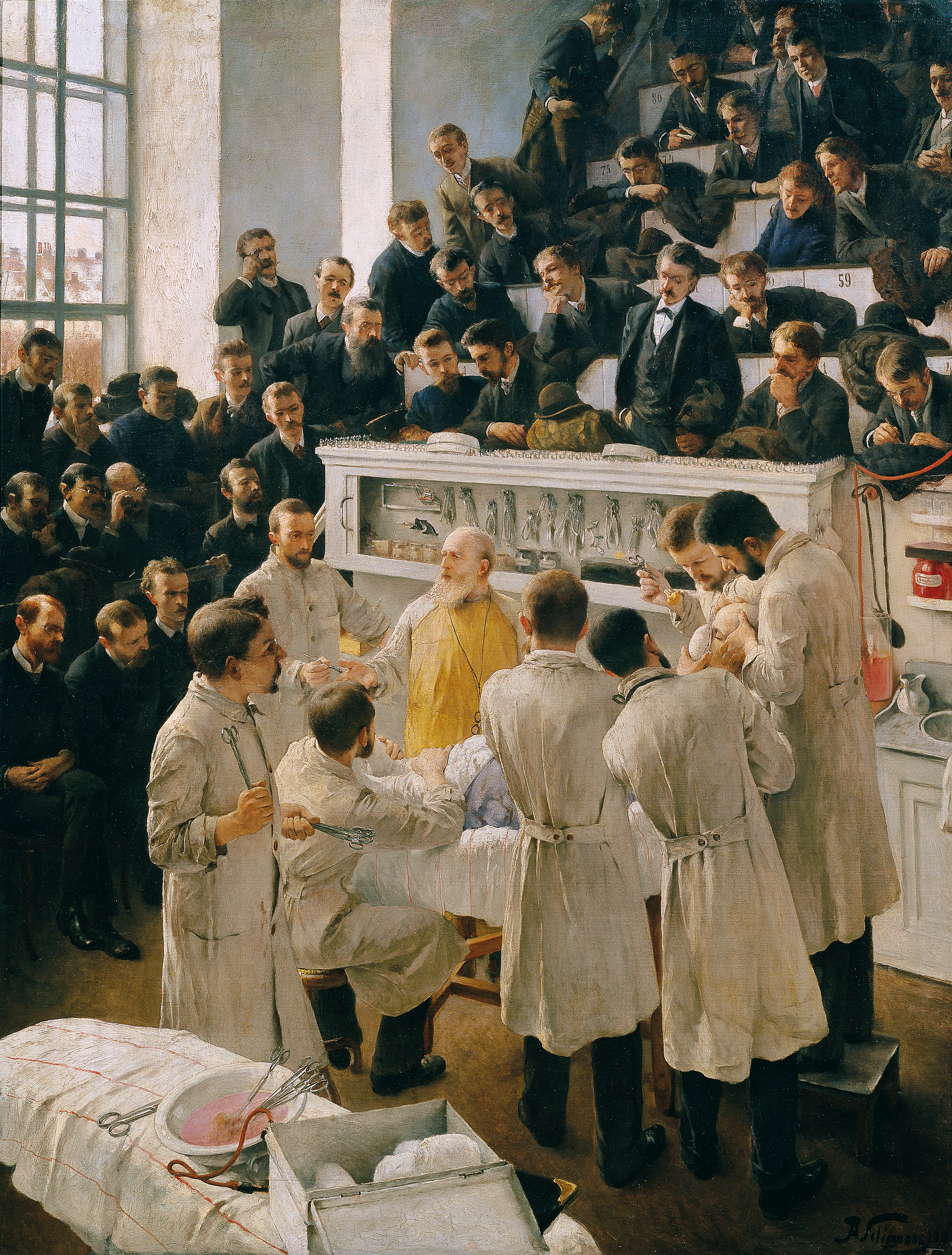
Dr.Theodor Billroth in the Lecture Room at Vienna General Hospital

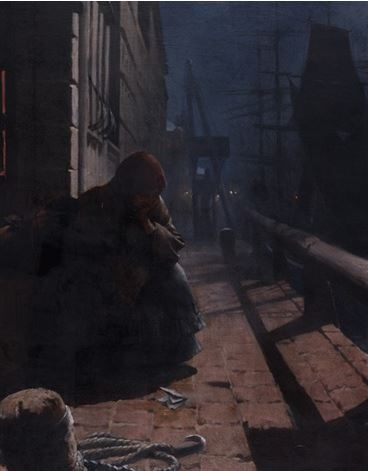
Abandoned

Adalbert Franz Seligmann (2 April 1862, Vienna – 13 December 1945, Vienna) was an Austrian painter and art critic. He signed his criticism with the name "Plein-Air", in reference to a style of landscape painting known as En plein air.

== Biography ==
His father was the Viennese medical historian, Romeo Seligmann so, from his youth, he was exposed to the intellectual circles of Austria. From 1880 to 1884, he studied at the Academy of Fine Arts, Vienna, under Christian Griepenkerl, after which he transferred to the Academy of Fine Arts, Munich. This was followed by study trips to France, Italy and Turkey. In 1896, he received a small gold medal at the Große Berliner Kunstausstellung.

He worked as a teacher of history painting at the Academy, as well as contributing art criticism and feuilletons to the Neue Freie Presse. His interests also extended to the relationship between art and the works of writers, such as Goethe and Franz Grillparzer. From 1897, he was a Professor.

One of his most notable achievements was as a co-founder of the "Frauenkunstschule" (women's art school), now known as the Wiener Frauenakademie. Perhaps his best known painting depicts the famous surgeon, Theodor Billroth, giving a lecture in anatomy. He also provided illustrations for the novels of Ludwig Ganghofer.

On an odd note, he possessed a skull fragment from Beethoven, that he had inherited from his father; preserving it in a secret location from 1936 to 1945. His heirs donated the fragment to the Ira F. Brilliant Center for Beethoven Studies at San Jose State University, California, in 1990.

Despite his Jewish ancestry, as a practicing Catholic he survived the Nazi regime and the war without incident. Much of his personal legacy has been preserved at the Wienbibliothek im Rathaus.

In 1958, a street in Vienna's Liesing district was named after him. On the occasion of his 100th birthday in 1962, a major retrospective was held in the reading room at the Wienbibliothek.

== Writings ==
- Kritische Studien von Plein-air., Vienna, 1904
- "Der sterbende Expressionismus", in: Neue Freie Presse, Nr. 20281, 13. February 1921, pg.1–4 (ANNO).
- Leopold Carl Müller. Ein Künstlerleben in Briefen, Bildern und Dokumenten, Vienna, 1922

== Sources ==
- Ch. Gruber/M. Haja, Seligmann Adalbert Franz, in: Österreichisches Biographisches Lexikon, Vol. 12 (Lfg. 56, 2002), pgs. 152f (Online).
- Maximilian Kaiser (Ed.): Adalbert Franz Seligmann. Essays und Kritiken (1918–1933), Vienna 2015 ISBN 978-3-7386-1693-4
- Maximilian Kaiser: Der Wiener Diskurs zur Avantgarde. Rekonstruktion und Analyse des Diskursnetzwerkes, Dissertation, Vienna University, 2017.
