= Elizabeth Dawes =

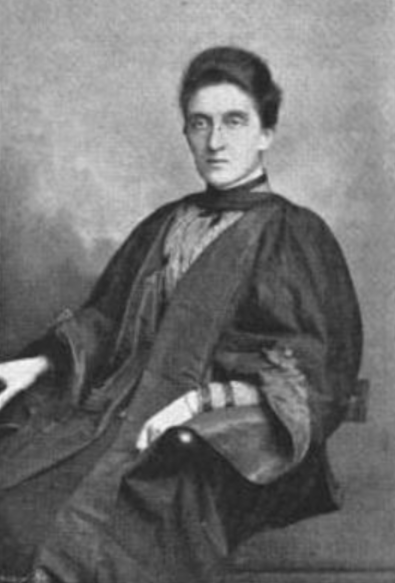
- In The Sketch, 29 May 1895
- Born: 7 November 1864; Surbiton, England
- Died: 19 August 1954 (aged 89); Weybridge, England

Academic background
- Education: University of London
- Thesis: The Pronunciation of Greek with Suggestions for a Reform in Teaching that Language

Academic work
- Discipline: Classics
- Institutions: Bryn Mawr College

Elizabeth Anna Sophia Dawes (1864–1954) was a 19th-century British classical scholar and the first woman to receive a DLitt degree from the University of London.

== Early life ==
Elizabeth was born on 7 November 1864 in Surbiton, England. In the 1881 census, aged 16, she is already listed as "scholar". At this time, the family, consisting of father the Revd John Samuel, mother Anna Sophia Elizabeth (or called Elizabeth Anna Sophia as well, according to the Oxford Dictionary of National Biography) and eight children, live at Newton House on Maple Road in Surbiton.

Her older sister Mary Clara Dawes was also a scholar, and the first woman to receive a master's degree in Arts. Mary Clara Dawes passed the matriculation examination in January 1879 and placed fourth in the list of masters of arts for the University of London in July 1884.

== Education ==
Dawes spent a year at Bedford College, London before matriculating as a Scholar at Girton College, Cambridge University. She got a good mark in the Classical Tripos but, as was the rule at that time, could not graduate from the University of Cambridge with a degree. Her good results are notable because girls generally received an inferior education to their male counterparts, which generally translated into lower marks in the Tripos.

She subsequently acquired a BA from the University of London, as well as being the first woman to receive a DLitt from the University of London, in 1895. The title of her thesis was The Pronunciation of Greek with Suggestions for a Reform in Teaching that Language, indicating an early interest in educational reform which would persist into her career as a headmistress of a girls' school.

== Career ==
Contrary to many women of the Victorian era, Dawes had a career. In addition to a professorship held at Bryn Mawr College in the US during the academic year 1886–87, when she was only 22, she was headmistress of a school in Surrey together with her sister Mary. In 1928, she translated Anna Comnena's Alexiad from Greek into English. The work is still in print almost 90 years later.

== Later life ==
Dawes died in Weybridge on 19 August 1954.

== Select bibliography ==
- The pronunciation of Greek with suggestions for a reform in teaching that language (1889)
- Classical Latin vocabularies for schools and colleges (1890)
- Attic Greek vocabularies for schools and colleges (1890)
- The pronunciation of the Greek aspirates (1894)
