= Mikulicz's drain =

Procedure used in emergency medicine

Mikulicz's drain is a name used for a procedure used in emergency medicine to control bleeding. Today, it is primarily used in post-operative surgery as a last resort when all other methods to control bleeding fail. The procedure involves pushing a layer of gauze into the wound, then packing in several more layers of gauze as the original layer is pushed deeper into the cavity. Pressure is thus induced while the capillary action of the improvised gauze-sac secures drainage.

It was developed by Polish surgeon Jan Mikulicz-Radecki (1850-1905) as a means to drain the abdominal cavity after an operation. In the past, the gauze was treated with iodoform as an antiseptic.
