= Julius Scriba =

German surgeon

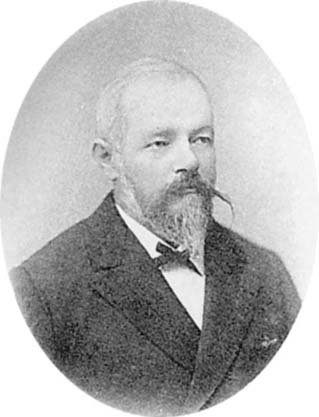
- Born: 5 June 1848; Darmstadt, Grand Duchy of Hesse
- Died: 3 January 1905 (aged 56); Kamakura, Japan
- Occupations: medical doctor, educator, foreign advisor to Japan
- Known for: foreign advisor to Meiji Japan

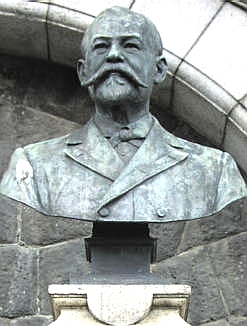
Bronze bust of Dr Julius Scriba at University of Tokyo

Julius Karl Scriba (5 June 1848 – 3 January 1905) was a German surgeon serving as a foreign advisor in Meiji-period Japan, where he was an important contributor to the development of Western medicine in the country.

== Biography ==
Scriba was born in Darmstadt, Germany and studied to become a pharmacist as well as a physician. His studies were interrupted by a year of military service during the Franco-Prussian War of 1870. He graduated three years after the end of the war from the University of Heidelberg and practiced medicine in Freiburg im Breisgau. He apprenticed under the noted surgeon Vincenz Czerny and from 1879 served as a lecturer at the University of Freiburg. In addition to his medical accomplishments, he was also a gifted amateur botanist, and published a book on the flora of the Grand-Duchy of Hesse. With the Austrian botanist Karl Keck Scriba issued the exsiccata Herbarium normale. Herbier des plantes nouvelles peu connues et rares d' Europe principalement de France et d' Allemagne publié par F. Schultz. Novelle. série, publié par Dr. K. Keck et Dr. J. Scriba from 1879 to 1880.

Beginning in 1870, the Meiji government of Japan hired a series of German medical specialists to establish a modern medical school system in Japan. At the time, German medicine was considered to be the most advanced in Europe, with most medical textbooks and research papers published in the German language. Western medicine had been introduced into Edo period Japan by German-speaking physicians such as Engelbert Kaempfer and Philipp Franz von Siebold, and the German physician Erwin Balz was serving as the personal physician to Emperor Meiji.

Scriba was employed by the Japanese government as a foreign advisor from 6 June 1881 to 5 June 1887, and taught surgery, dermatology, ophthalmology and gynecology at the Medical School of Tokyo Imperial University. In 1885 he first described the endemic form of bacterial infection pyomyositis in the tropics. He returned once to Germany on the expiration of his contract, but his contract was renewed again from 2 September 1889 to 10 September 1901. During his second tenure in Japan, he is credited with performing the first craniectomy for a depressed skull fracture in Japan in 1892. He trained many surgeons who later became leaders in modern Japanese surgery. His Japanese assistant Miyake Hayari (1867–1945) was one of the first Japanese neurosurgeons. From 1893 he was imperial embassy doctor at the German embassy in Tokyo. Subsequently, he was chief surgeon until 1905 at the St. Luke's Hospital in Tokyo. He also was the first honorary member of the Japanese Society for Surgery and Honorary Professor of the University of Tokyo.

Scriba was called upon by the Japanese government twice during particularly sensitive international incidents: the first time was after the Otsu Scandal, when Russian Tsarevich Nicholas Alexandrovitch (the future Tsar Nicholas II), was assaulted by a Japanese policeman in 1891; and the second time when the Chinese diplomat Li Hongzhang was shot while attending the Shimonoseki Peace Conference in 1895 which ended the First Sino-Japanese War. For his services, Emperor Meiji awarded him the Order of the Sacred Treasures.

Scriba died of a lung abscess in Kamakura, Kanagawa prefecture in 1905, and was buried in the foreign section of Aoyama Cemetery in Tokyo.
