= Abu Mansur Muwaffaq =

Persian physician

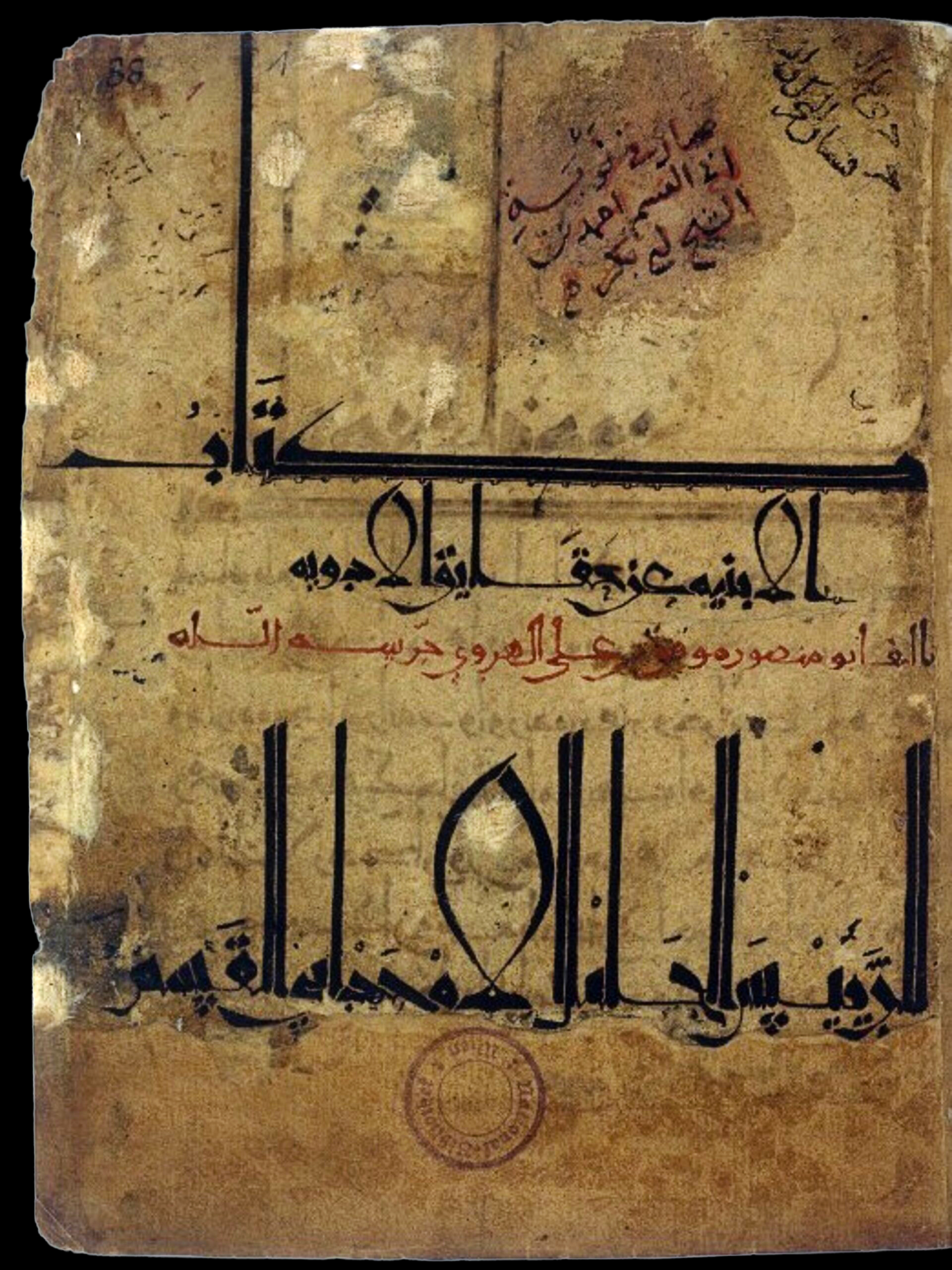
Title page of al-Abniya 'an Haqa'iq al-Adwiya from an 11th-century manuscript

Abū Manṣūr Muwaffaq Harawī (Arabic/Persian: أبو منصور موفق هروي) was a 10th-century Persian physician.

He flourished in Herat (modern-day Afghanistan), under the Samanid prince Mansur I, who ruled from 961 to 976.

He was apparently the first to think of compiling a treatise on materia medica in Persian; he travelled extensively in Persia and India to obtain the necessary information.

Abu Mansur distinguished between sodium carbonate and potassium carbonate, and seems to have had some knowledge about arsenious oxide, cupric oxide, silicic acid, and antimony; he knew the toxicological effects of copper and lead compounds, the depilatory vertue of quicklime, the composition of plaster of Paris, and its surgical use.

== The book, al-Abniya ==
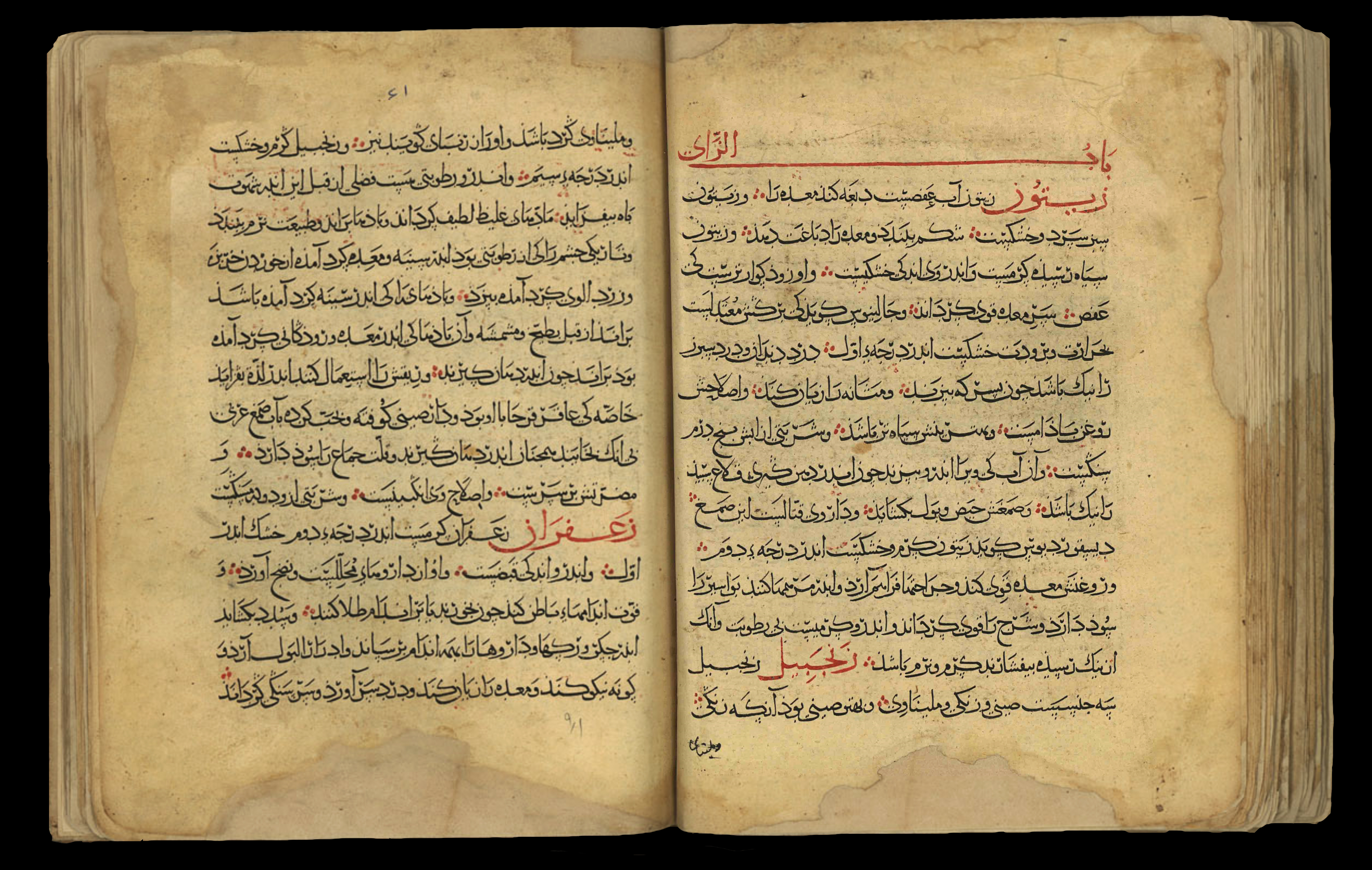
Kitab al-Abniya 'an Haqa'iq al-Adwiya excerpt from a 13th-15th century manuscript.

Between 968 and 977 C.E., Muwaffaq compiled his Book of the Remedies (Kitab al-Abniya 'an Haqa'iq al-Adwiya, کتاب الابنیه عن حقائق الادویه), which is the oldest prose work in New Persian. It is also the only work of his to survive into modern times. The book begins with an introductory general theory of pharmacology. The body of the work mainly deals with over five-hundred remedies (most of which are plant-based, however seventy-five come from minerals, and forty-four from animals); they are classified into four groups according to their physiological action. Muwaffaq was a consummate scholar, and cited Arab, Greek, Syrian and Ayurvedic authorities.

The oldest copy of this book that we have is from 1055, which was transcribed by Asadi Tusi, a famous poet, and is in the Austrian National Library.

== See also ==
- List of khurasan scientists
