= Bedford College =

Bedford College may refer to:

- Bedford College, Bedford, a further education college based in Bedford, England, founded 1959
- Bedford College of Higher Education, a former higher education college based in Bedford, England, active 1976–1994
- Bedford College, London, a university college in London, England, founded 1849, merged into Royal Holloway College 1985
