= Jan Mikulicz-Radecki =

Polish surgeon

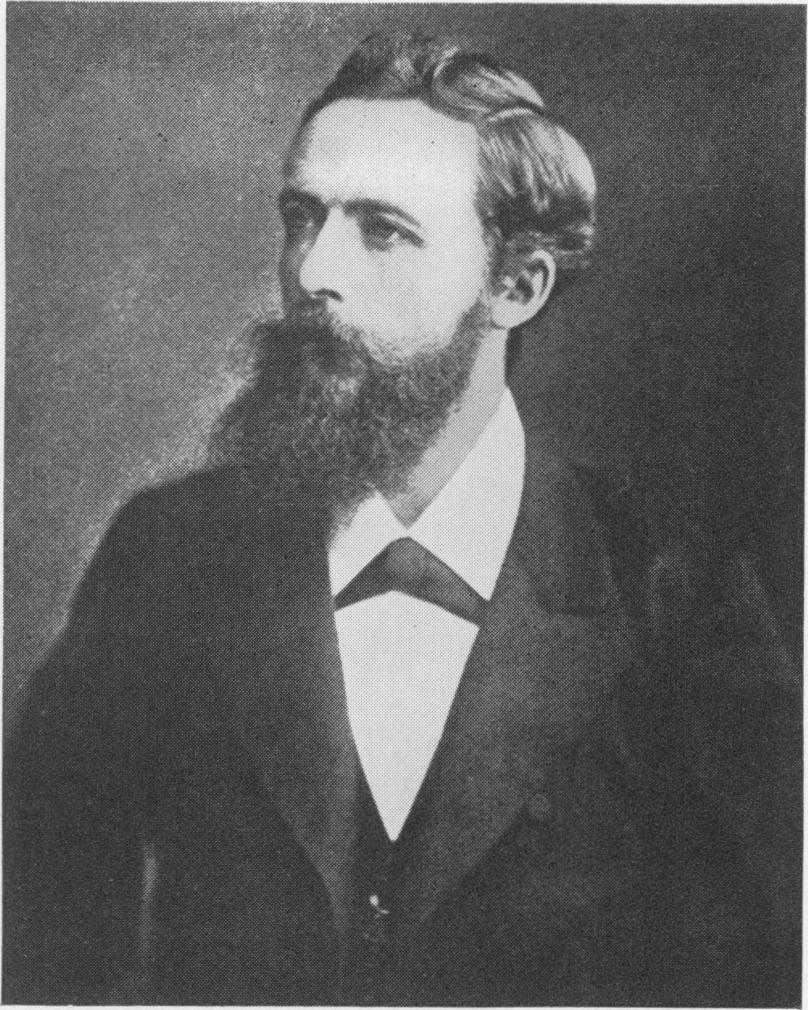
- Jan Mikulicz-Radecki, 1878
- Born: 16 May 1850; Chernivtsi, Bukovina, Austrian Empire
- Died: 4 June 1905 (aged 55); Breslau, German Empire
- Education: University of Vienna
- Scientific career
- Fields: surgeon
- Workplaces: Kraków; Königsberg; Breslau
- Doctoral advisor: Theodor Billroth

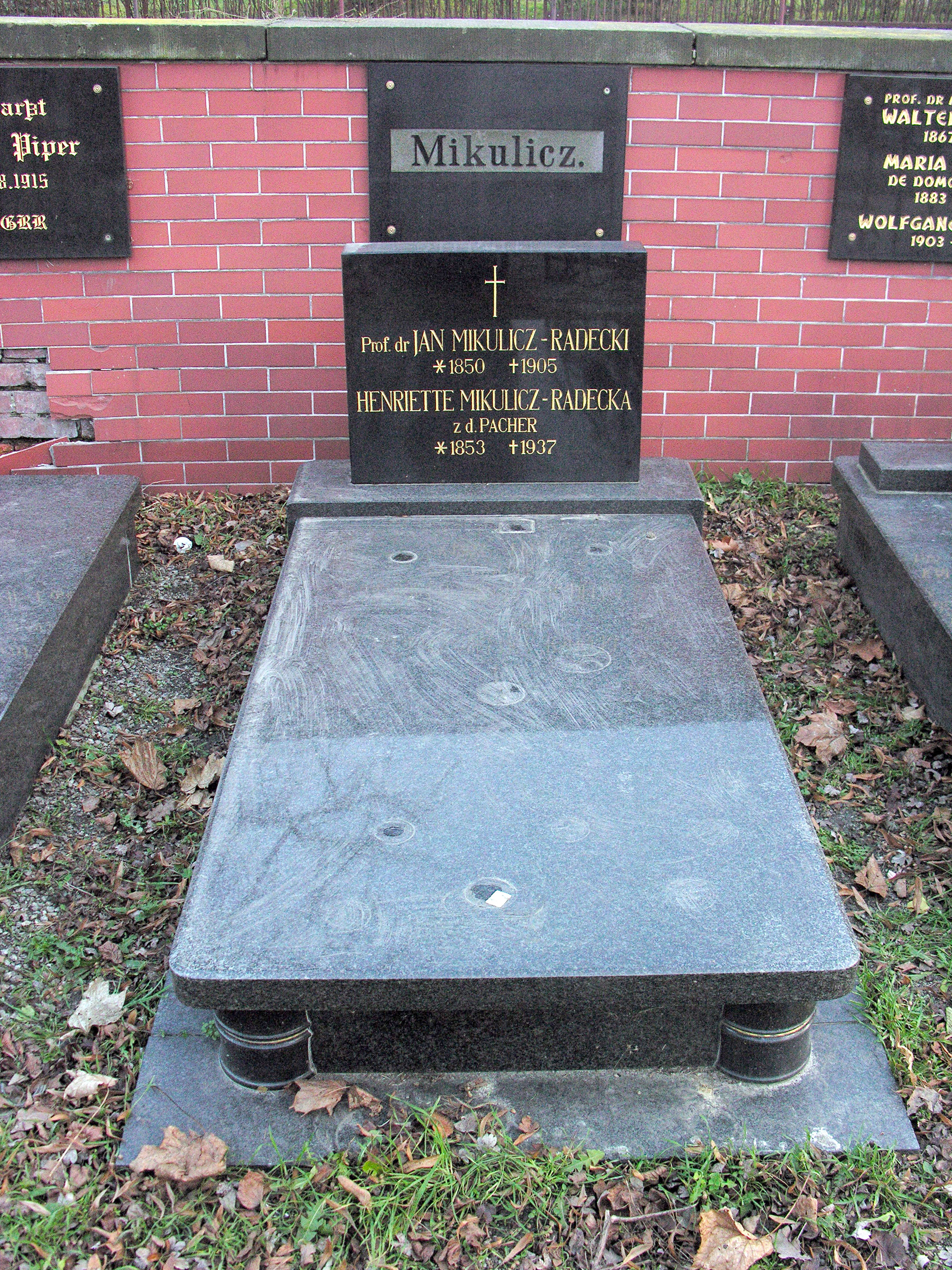
Mikulicz-Radecki's grave in Świebodzice

Jan Mikulicz-Radecki (German: Johann Freiherr von Mikulicz-Radecki) was a German-Polish-Austrian surgeon who worked mainly in the German Empire. He was born on 16 May 1850 in Czerniowce in the Austrian Empire (present-day Chernivtsi in Ukraine) and died on 4 June 1905 in Breslau, German Empire (present-day Wrocław in Poland). He was professor in Kraków, Breslau, and Königsberg. He was the inventor of new operating techniques and tools, and is one of the pioneers of antiseptics and aseptic techniques. In Poland he is regarded as one of the founders of the Kraków school of surgery.

== Life ==
His parental ancestors of the Mikulicz family were of Polish szlachta origin and had been granted the Gozdawa coat of arms by King John III Sobieski after the 1683 Battle of Vienna. His mother Emilie Freiin von Damnitz was of Austrian descent. Mikulicz-Radecki spoke his native German and also Polish, Russian and English fluently. When asked his nationality he simply answered "surgeon". After finishing studies at the University of Vienna under Theodor Billroth, he was a director of surgery at the Jagiellonian University in Kraków, the University of Königsberg (Kaliningrad) and from 1890 at the University of Breslau.

Mikulicz-Radecki's innovations in operative technique for a wide variety of diseases helped develop modern surgery. He contributed prodigiously to cancer surgery, especially on organs of the digestive system. He was first to suture a perforated gastric ulcer (1885), surgically restore part of the oesophagus (1886), remove a malignant part of the colon (1903), and describe what is now known as Mikulicz’ disease.

In 1881, he developed improved models of the esophagoscope and gastroscope. As an ardent advocate of antiseptics, he did much to popularize Joseph Lister's antiseptic methods. He created a surgical mask and was the first to use medical gloves during surgery.

Mikulicz-Radecki was a talented amateur pianist and a friend of Johannes Brahms.

He received an honorary doctorate (LL.D) from the University of Glasgow in June 1901.

The German ornithologist Maria Koepcke (born Maria Emilie Anna von Mikulicz-Radecki) and her daughter the German mammalogist Juliane Koepcke, are his descendants.

== Associated eponyms ==
- Heineke–Mikulicz pyloroplasty: reconstruction of the pyloric channel with a longitudinal incision of the pylorus, and suturing the incision transversely. Named along with German surgeon Walter Hermann von Heineke (1834–1901). (Dorlands Medical Dictionary)
- Heineke–Mikulicz strictureplasty: one of two procedures commonly employed to relieve fibrotic strictures of the small bowel, the other being Finney strictureplasty.
- Mikulicz's cells: Vesicular cells found in the diseased tissue in cases of rhinoscleroma and containing Klebsiella rhinoscleromatis.
- Mikulicz's disease: Benign lymphocytic infiltration and enlargement of the lacrimal and salivary glands. It has often been referred to as benign lymphoepithelial lesion, but is now regarded as a manifestation of IgG4-related disease.
- Mikulicz's drain: Process of pushing successive layers of gauze into a wound or cavity.
- Mikulicz's enterotome (historical term): A special scissors developed by Guillaume Dupuytren. An enterotome is used in abdominal surgery.
- Mikulicz's mask (historical term): Gauze-covered frame worn over nose and mouth during an operation.
- Mikulicz's aphtae : Another name for minor aphtae
- Mikulicz's pad (historical term): A gauze-pad used in abdominal surgery
- Mikulicz's syndrome: Symptoms characteristic of Mikulicz's disease when occurring as a complication of another disease, such as leukemia or sarcoidosis.
- Mikulicz–Vladimiroff operation; also Mikulicz–Vladimiroff amputation (historical term): resection of the foot in diseases of the talus and calcaneus.

== See also ==
- List of Poles
