= Langenbeck's Archives of Surgery =

- Discipline: Surgery
- Language: English
- Edited by: Markus W. Büchler

Publication details
- Former names: Archiv für Klinische Chirurgie, Langenbecks Archiv für Chirurgie
- History: 1860–present
- Publisher: Springer Science+Business Media
- Frequency: 8/year
- Impact factor: 3.445 (2020)

Standard abbreviations
- ISO 4: Langenbeck's Arch. Surg.

Indexing
- ISSN: 1435-2443 (print); 1435-2451 (web)
- OCLC no.: 782075262

Links
- Journal homepage

Langenbeck's Archives of Surgery (or in German, Langenbecks Archiv für Chirurgie), established in 1860 as Archiv für Klinische Chirurgie by founding editor Bernhard von Langenbeck, is the oldest medical journal of surgery in the world. It is the official journal of several European surgical societies: German Society of Surgery, German Society of General and Visceral Surgery, German Association of Endocrine Surgeons, European Society of Endocrine Surgeons, and the German, Austrian and Swiss Surgical Associations for Minimal Invasive Surgery. The journal is currently published by Springer Science+Business Media and the editor-in-chief is Markus W. Büchler (University of Heidelberg). The journal was original published in German, but is exclusively in English since 1998, when it obtained its current English title.

== Abstracting and indexing ==
The journal is indexed and abstracted in:

- Academic OneFile
- Academic Search
- Biological Abstracts
- BIOSIS
- CSA Environmental Sciences
- Current Contents/Clinical Medicine
- EBSCO
- EMBASE
- GALE
- Health Reference Center Academic
- IBIDS
- PubMed/Medline
- Science Citation Index Expanded
- Scopus
- Summon by ProQuest

According to the Journal Citation Reports, the journal has a 2020 impact factor of 3.445.
