= Ernst Blasius =

German surgeon (1802–1875)

Ernst Carl Friedrich Blasius (20 November 1802, Berlin - 11 July 1875) was a German surgeon.

He was a student at the medical-surgical institute in Berlin, graduating in 1823 with the thesis "De tractus intestinorum formatione in mammalium embryonibus". After several years of military medical service, he relocated to the University of Halle, where in 1829, he became an associate professor.

From 1831 he served as director of the university hospital at Halle. In 1834 he became a full professor, and was appointed director of the surgery/ophthalmology clinic. In 1867, he resigned from clinical work for health reasons, his position at Halle being filled by his former assistant, Richard von Volkmann (1830–1889).

As a surgeon, he developed his own techniques of operation in reconstructive surgery, and distinguished himself in his work involving joint dislocations. Also, he made contributions in his research of blood transfusions.

== Selected writings ==
- Handbuch der Akiurgie, zum Gebrauche bei Vorlesungen und zum Selbstunterricht, 1830-1832 - Handbook of surgery, for use in lectures and self-study.
- Akiurgische Abbildungen; oder, Darstellung der blutigen chirurgischen Operationen und der für dieselben erfundenen Werkzeuge, mit erläuterndem Texte, 1833 - Surgical pictures, or views of bloody surgical operations, etc.
- Lehrbuch der Akiurgie für Lehrende als Grundlage zu vorträgen, für lernende zum Gebrauche bei Repetitionen, 1835 - Textbook of surgery for teachers as a basis for lectures, etc.

Books about Ernst Blasius:

- "Surgery illustrated : compiled from the works of Cutler, Hind, Velpeau, and Blasius" (several authors); New-York : Harper, 1836.
