= Bernhard von Langenbeck =

German surgeon (1810–1887)

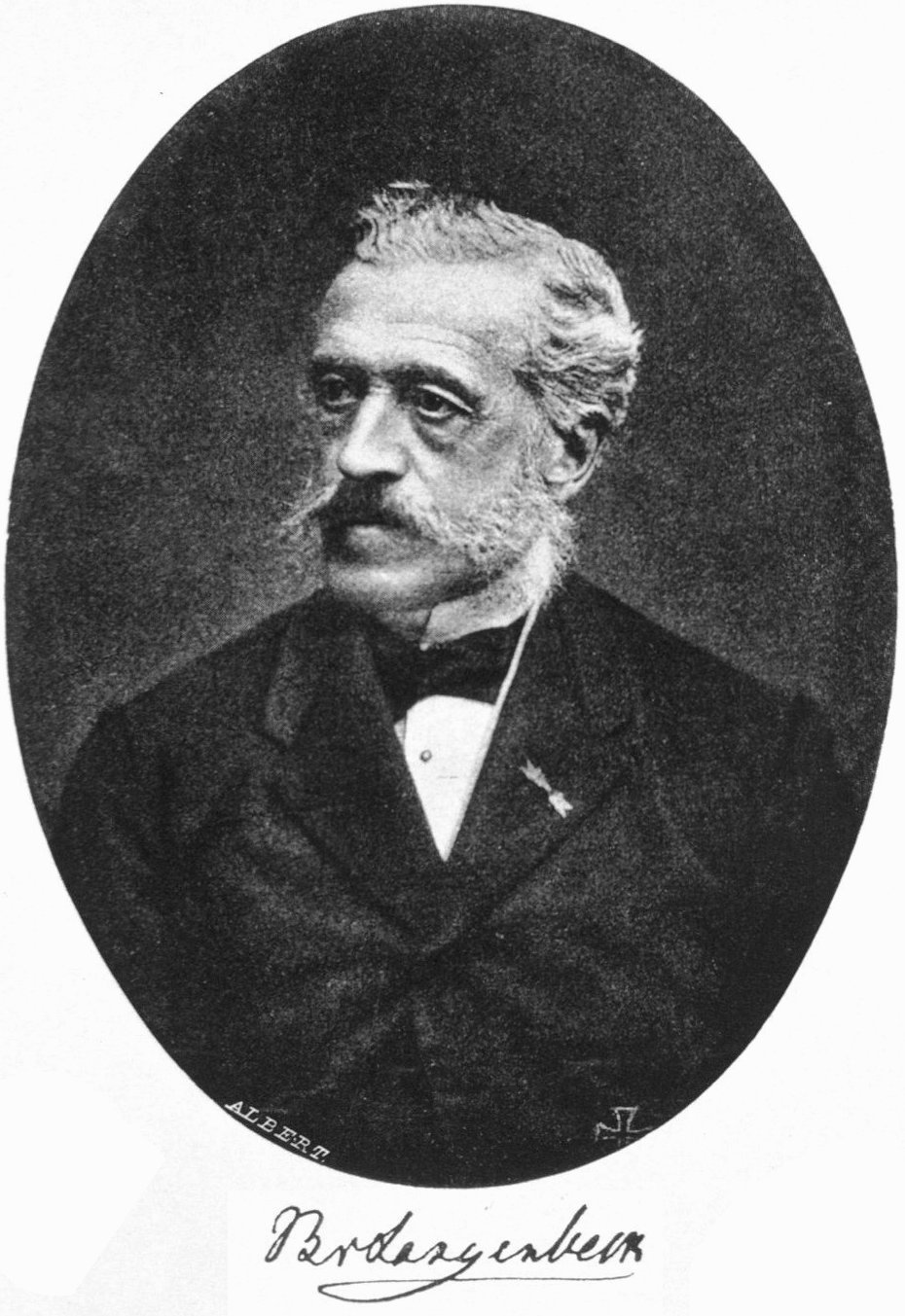
- Born: 11 September 1810; Padingbüttel, Germany
- Died: 29 September 1887 (aged 77); Wiesbaden, Germany
- Medical career
- Profession: Surgeon

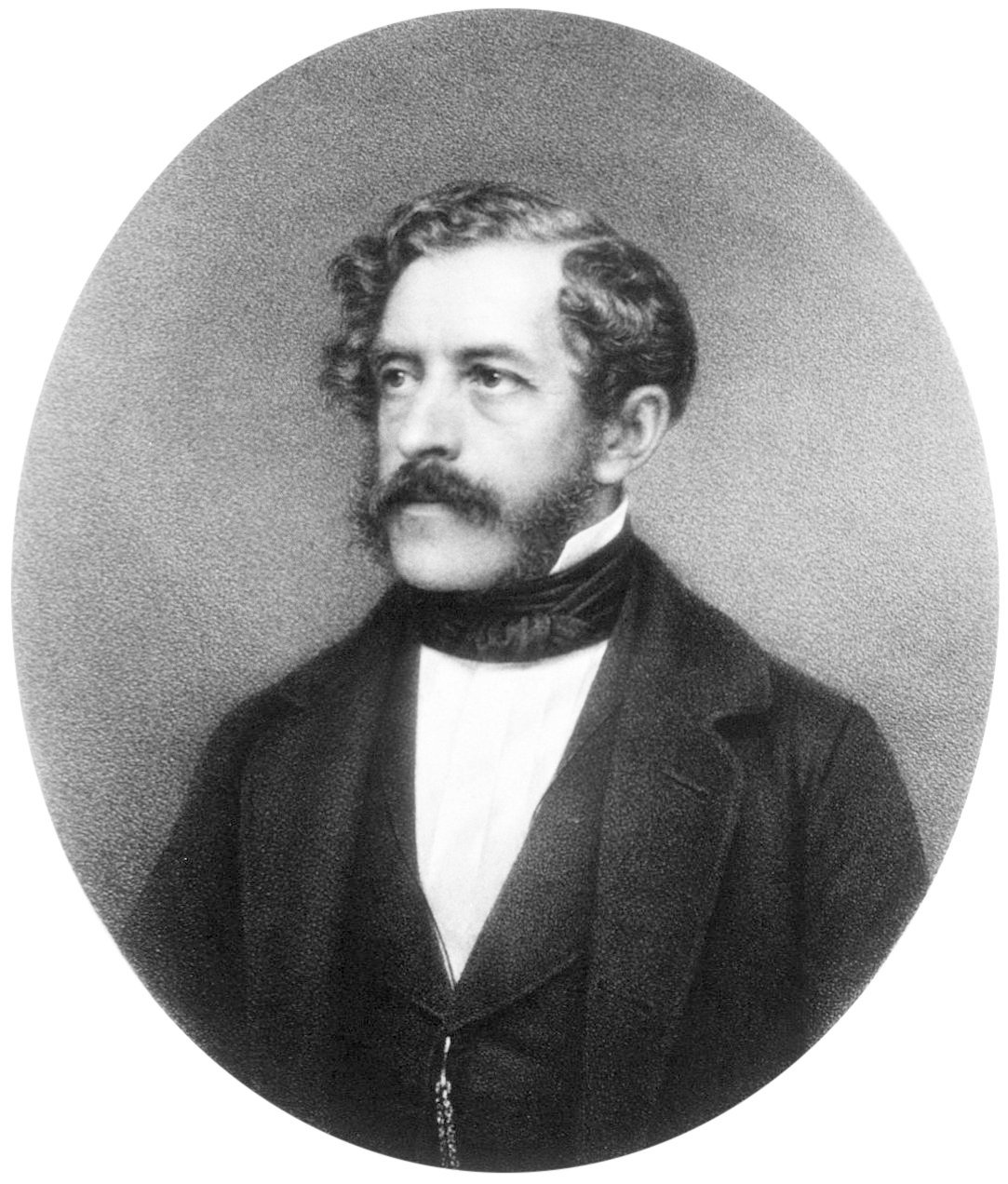
Bernhard von Langenbeck

Bernhard Rudolf Konrad von Langenbeck (9 November 1810 – 29 September 1887) was a German surgeon known as the developer of Langenbeck's amputation and founder of Langenbeck's Archives of Surgery.

== Early life and education ==
He was born at Padingbüttel, and received his medical education at Göttingen, where one of his teachers was his uncle Konrad Johann Martin Langenbeck. He obtained his doctorate in 1835 with a thesis on the structure of the retina.

== Career ==
After a visit to France and England, he returned to Göttingen as Privatdozent, and in 1842 became Professor of Surgery and Director of Friedrichs Hospital at Kiel. Six years later he succeeded Johann Friedrich Dieffenbach (1794–1847) as Director of the Clinical Institute for Surgery and Ophthalmology at the Charité in Berlin, and remained there until 1882, when failing health forced him to retire.

Langenbeck was a bold and skillful surgeon, but preferred not to operate while other means afforded a prospect of success. He specialised in military surgery and became an authority on the treatment of gunshot wounds. He served as general field-surgeon of the army in the First Schleswig War in 1848 and saw active service in the Second Schleswig War in 1864, being ennobled for his services. He also served in the Austro-Prussian War in 1866, and the Franco-Prussian War of 1870–71. He was in Orléans at the end of 1870 after the city had been taken by the Prussians and in his capacity as surgeon or as consultant tended to the wounded men with whom every public building was packed. He also utilized the opportunities for instruction that arose, and the Militär-ärztliche Gesellschaft, which met twice a week for some months, and in the discussions of which every surgeon in the city, irrespective of nationality, was invited to take part, was mainly formed by his energy and enthusiasm. He died at Wiesbaden in September 1887.

At the Geneva International Convention, he endorsed the German Emperor's quote on conduct "a wounded enemy is no more an enemy, but a comrade needing help".

von Langenbeck is sometimes referred to as the "father of the surgical residency". Under his tutelage at the Charite in Berlin, he conceived and developed a system whereby new medical graduates would live at the hospital as they gradually assumed a greater role in the day-to-day care and supervision of surgical patients. Among his most well-known "house staff" were such surgeons as Billroth and Emil Theodor Kocher. The great achievement of his house-staff model was acknowledged by no less than Sir William Osler and William Halsted, who quickly co-opted his concept into the teaching system of the Departments of Medicine and Surgery, respectively, at the Johns Hopkins Hospital in Baltimore in the late 19th century.
