= Theodor Billroth =

German-Austrian surgeon (1829–1894)

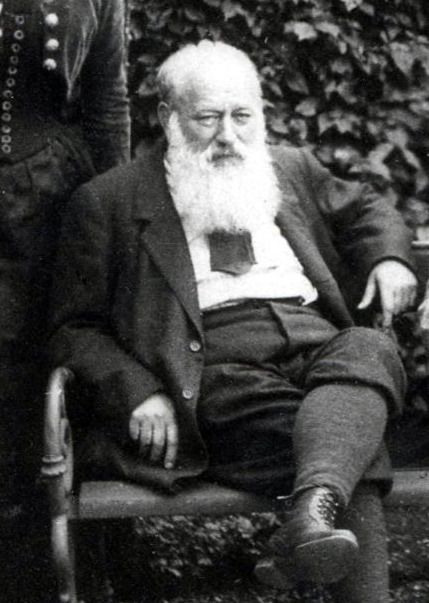
- Born: Christian Albert Theodor Billroth; 26 April 1829; Bergen auf Rügen, Pomerania, Prussia
- Died: 6 February 1894 (aged 64); Opatija, Austrian Littoral, Austria-Hungary
- Education: University of Greifswald, University of Göttingen, University of Berlin
- Known for: Being the founding father of modern abdominal surgery First successful gastrectomy for gastric cancer Applying scientific methods to musicality
- Medical career
- Profession: Surgeon
- Institutions: Surgical hospital and clinic, Zurich; University of Zurich; Allgemeine Krankenhaus; University of Vienna
- Sub-specialties: Abdominal surgery

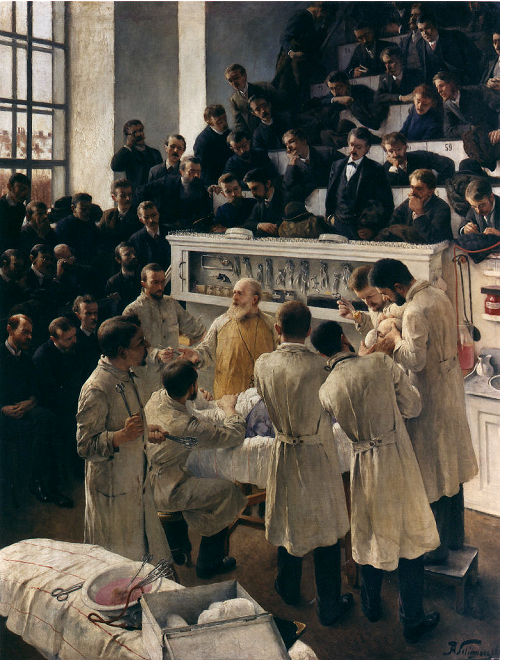
Theodor Billroth Operating by Adalbert Seligmann

Christian Albert Theodor Billroth (26 April 1829 – 6 February 1894) was one of the most eminent surgeons of the 19th century, with his main contributions in gastrectomy, laryngectomy and anatomical pathology and is generally regarded as the founding father of modern abdominal surgery.

As early as 1874 he discovered the bacteriostatic effects of penicillium, which makes him the primary discoverer of penicillin.

He was a close friend and confidant of Johannes Brahms, a leading patron of the Viennese musical scene, and one of the first to attempt a scientific analysis of musicality.

== Early life and education ==
Billroth was born at Bergen auf Rügen in the Kingdom of Prussia, the son of a Lutheran minister. Billroth was the eldest of five sons. His father died of dysentery when Billroth was five years old. His mother moved with the children to his grandfather´s house in Greifswald, where he attended school. He obtained his Abitur degree in 1848. Billroth was an indifferent student, and spent more time practicing piano than studying. Torn between a career as a musician or as a physician, he acceded to his mother's wishes and enrolled himself at the University of Greifswald to study medicine, but spent the whole of his first term studying music. When Wilhelm Baum was appointed to the Chair of Surgery at the University of Göttingen, Billroth followed. Devoting himself to his medical studies he studied surgery under Baum and physiology under Rudolph Wagner (1805–1864). In 1851, under the guidance of Rudolph Wagner, Billroth and fellow student Georg Meissner (1829–1905), made a scientific trip to Trieste to study the torpedo fish.

Billroth wrote his thesis, in Latin, in which he described the effects of vagotomy on the lungs and the value of tracheostomy. He graduated in 1852). After the official state examination was over he fulfilled his obligatory military service, which he considered a waste of time, except for the training in discipline. Thereafter he tried to start a practice as a family doctor in Berlin, which failed because no patients consulted him.

== Career in surgery ==
From 1853 to 1860 Billroth became an assistant at Bernhard von Langenbeck’s surgical clinic at the Charité in Berlin. There he was also apprenticed to Carl Langenbuch. In 1856 he was appointed lecturer (Privatdozent) in Surgery and in Pathological anatomy. In 1860, Billroth accepted an offer from the University of Zurich to become the Chair of Clinical Surgery, becoming director of the surgical hospital and clinic in Zurich. The beginning of his career in Switzerland was unpromising: during his first semester of teaching, he had only ten students, and he himself said that the income he received from his private practice was insufficient to pay for his morning cup of coffee. His reputation quickly grew however; Billroth had an infectious personality, attracting both students and surgical trainees to his ranks. He was loved by his students, and was an effective undergraduate as well as graduate teacher. Students flocked to his lectures, and with the cooperation of energetic colleagues, he was able to raise the Medical Faculty of Zurich to a prominent position among German speaking schools in only a few years.

While in Zurich, Billroth published his classic textbook Die allgemeine chirurgische Pathologie und Therapie (General Surgical Pathology and Therapy) (1863). At the same time he introduced the concept of audits, publishing all results, good and bad, which automatically resulted in honest discussion on morbidity, mortality, and techniques – with resultant improvements in patient selection.

He was appointed professor of surgery at the University of Vienna in 1867, in succession to Franz Schuh; there, he practiced surgery as chief of the Second Surgical Clinic at the Allgemeine Krankenhaus (Vienna General Hospital). Though he laid the foundation of his fame at Zurich, it was in Vienna, a larger and more conspicuous theater, that he established himself as the power that he was in the surgical world. A speech he gave in 1875, protesting influxes of Jewish medical students, has been counted as one of the first events in the development of Viennese political anti-Semitism.

During the Franco-Prussian War, Billroth did excellent work in the military hospital at Mannheim and Weissenburg, treating a variety of horrific battlefield injuries with aggressive and ambitious surgeries; he embodied his experience of war surgery in his Surgical Letters from Mannheim and Weissenburg. He was so impressed by the horrors of war that he was ever afterwards an ardent advocate of peace. On December 3, 1891, he delivered an address on the care of the wounded in war which made a profound sensation and led to large sums of money being voted by the Austrian legislative chambers for the provision of adequate means of succour for the wounded.

He did not limit himself to surgery only, and conducted extensive research on an ailment that affected many surgery patients at the time: wound fever. His treatise on wound fever, Untersuchungen über die Vegetationsformen von Coccobacteria septica (1874; “Investigations of the Vegetal Forms of Coccobacteria septica”) concluded that the cause was bacterial; Billroth was quick to use antiseptic techniques in his surgical practice, and the number of surgical patients afflicted with wound fever greatly decreased. With the threat of fatal surgical infections lessened through his work and others’, Billroth proceeded to turn his attention to surgery and the pioneering field of altering or removing organs that had previously been considered inaccessible.

An early adopter of the "white coat" (as shown in Seligmann's c.1890 painting), Billroth was directly responsible for a number of landmarks in surgery; in 1872, he was the first to conduct an esophagectomy, removing a section of the oesophagus and joining the remaining parts together. In 1873, he performed the first laryngectomy, completely excising a cancerous larynx. He was the first surgeon to excise a rectal cancer and by 1876, he had performed 33 such operations. By 1881, Billroth had made intestinal surgery seem almost commonplace. But his most famous accomplishment is unquestionably the first successful gastrectomy for gastric cancer. On January 29, 1881, after many ill-fated attempts, Billroth performed the first successful resection for antral carcinoma on Therese Heller, who lived for almost 4 months and died of liver metastases. He accomplished this operation by closing the greater curvature side of the stomach and anastomosing the lesser curvature to the duodenum, in an operation that is still known as the Billroth I to this day.

Billroth's literary activity was widespread, with the total number of published books and papers of which he was the author numbering about one hundred and forty. He collaborated with Franz von Pitha on a Textbook of General and Special Surgery (1882). To this, Billroth contributed the section on Scrofulosis and Tuberculosis, Injuries and Diseases of the Breast, Instruments and Operations, Burns, Frostbites, etc.

Billroth passed his restless intellectual spirit to numerous distinguished students, creating the "Billroth School" of followers. No aspect of his profession seemed to escape his intense scrutiny, be it research, teaching, administration, or nursing. He not only had something valuable to say about each but often saw to it that his ideas became concrete reality. In all the spheres he sought to influence, he was guided by a belief in the unity of science and art, and by confidence in his own ability to effect change.

Billroth was instrumental in establishing the first modern school of thought in surgery. He had radical ideas on surgical training, advocating a prolonged surgical apprenticeship on completion of medical studies consisting of preliminary work in hospitals followed by performing operations on cadavers and experimental animals. This would be followed by a 2-3 year assistantship in a surgical department with studies of the surgical literature and the acquisition of advanced practical skills. Among his disciples were the notable surgeons Alexander von Winiwarter, Jan Mikulicz-Radecki and John B. Murphy. William Halsted's pioneer surgical residency program was greatly influenced by Billroth's own methods of surgical education.

== Music ==
Billroth was a talented amateur pianist and violinist. During his time in Zurich he regularly played string quartet with professional musicians such as Theodor Kirchner and Friedrich Hegar. In 1865 he met Brahms for the first time when the rising composer and pianist played Robert Schumann's piano concerto and his own works in Zurich. After Billroth had moved to Vienna in 1867 they became close friends and shared many musical insights. Brahms frequently sent Billroth his original manuscripts in order to get his opinion before publication, and Billroth participated as a musician in trial rehearsals of many of Brahms' chamber works before their first performances. Brahms dedicated his first two string quartets, Opus 51, to Billroth.

Billroth and Brahms, together with the acerbic and influential Viennese music critic Eduard Hanslick, formed the core of the musical conservatives who opposed the innovations of Richard Wagner and Franz Liszt. In the conflict, known as the War of the Romantics, Billroth supported Brahms, but was always fair and measured in his comments. "Wagner was indeed a very considerable talent in many directions," he wrote in 1888.

Billroth started an essay called "Wer ist musikalisch?" ("Who is musical?"), which was published posthumously by Hanslick. It was one of the earliest attempts to apply scientific methods to musicality. In the essay, Billroth identifies different types of amusicality (tone deafness, rhythm-deafness and harmony-deafness) that suggest some of the different cognitive skills involved in the perception of music. Billroth died in Opatija, Austria-Hungary, before he could complete the research.

Excelling at both his vocation and his avocation, Billroth never saw science and music as being in conflict. On the contrary, he considered the two to complement each other. "It is one of the superficialities of our time to see in science and in art two opposites," he wrote in a letter. "Imagination is the mother of both."

== Honours ==
In 1887 Billroth was made a member of the Austrian Herrenhaus, "House of Lords"; a distinction rarely bestowed on members of the medical profession. In 1888, Theodor Billroth was elected member of the German Academy of Sciences Leopoldina.
