= Christopher Reeve on stage and screen =

List of films featuring Christopher Reeve

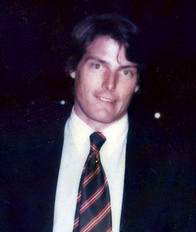
Reeve in 1980

The following are stage and screen credits for American actor and director Christopher Reeve (1952–2004).

== Film ==
| Year | Title | Role | Notes | Ref. |
|---|---|---|---|---|
| 1978 | Gray Lady Down | Lieutenant JG Phillips | | |
| 1978 | Superman | Kal-El / Clark Kent / Superman | | |
| 1980 | Somewhere in Time | Richard Collier | | |
| 1980 | Superman II | Clark Kent / Superman | | |
| 1982 | Deathtrap | Clifford Anderson | | |
| 1982 | Monsignor | Father John Flaherty | | |
| 1983 | Superman III | Clark Kent / Superman / Evil Superman | | |
| 1984 | The Bostonians | Basil Ransom | | |
| 1985 | The Aviator | Edgar Anscombe | | |
| 1985 | Vincent: A Dutchman | Narrator (voice) | Documentary; direct-to-video | |
| 1986 | America's Cup – Yank It Back | Narrator (voice) | Documentary; direct-to-video | |
| 1987 | Street Smart | Jonathan Fisher | | |
| 1987 | Superman IV: The Quest for Peace | Clark Kent / Superman | Also writer (story), 2d unit director, flying/2d unit | |
| 1988 | Switching Channels | Blaine Bingham | | |
| 1991 | Trump: What's the Deal? | Himself | Documentary; direct-to-video | |
| 1992 | Noises Off | Frederick Dallas / Philip Brent | | |
| 1992 | The American Constitution: The Road from Runnymede | Narrator (voice) | Documentary; direct-to-video | |
| 1992 | A Tigers Tale – The Tiger Moth Story | Himself | Documentary; direct-to-video | |
| 1993 | Morning Glory | Will Parker | | |
| 1993 | The Remains of the Day | Congressman Jack Lewis | | |
| 1994 | Speechless | Bob Freed | | |
| 1995 | Village of the Damned | Dr. Alan Chaffee | | |
| 1997 | The Toughest Break: Martin's Story | Host / Narrator | Documentary; direct-to-video | |
| 2005 | The Last Wild Place | Narrator (voice) | Posthumous release; documentary short; direct-to-video | |
| 2006 | Everyone's Hero | —N/a | Posthumous release; co-director and executive producer | |
| 2006 | Superman II: The Richard Donner Cut | Kal-El / Clark Kent / Superman | Posthumous release | |
| 2007 | Christopher Reeve: Choosing Hope | Himself | Posthumous release; archive footage; follow-up to Hope in Motion; documentary; direct-to-video | |
| 2024 | Super/Man: The Christopher Reeve Story | Himself | Posthumous release; archive footage; documentary | |

== Television ==
=== Television films ===
| Year | Title | Role | Notes | Ref. |
|---|---|---|---|---|
| 1979 | The Muppets Go Hollywood | Himself | Television special | |
| 1982 | I Love Liberty | Himself | Television special | |
| 1982 | Night of 100 Stars | Himself | Television special | |
| 1985 | Anna Karenina | Alexei Vronsky | | |
| 1985 | Dinosaur! | Himself / Host | Documentary | |
| 1985 | Night of 100 Stars II | Himself | Television special | |
| 1987 | The Grand Knockout Tournament | Himself | Television special | |
| 1988 | The Great Escape II: The Untold Story | Major John Dodge | | |
| 1988 | The World's Greatest Stunts: A Tribute to Hollywood Stuntmen | Himself / Host | Television special | |
| 1990 | The Rose and the Jackal | Allan Pinkerton | | |
| 1990 | Black Tide | Narrator (voice) | Documentary | |
| 1990 | Night of 100 Stars III | Himself | Television special | |
| 1991 | Bump in the Night | Lawrence Muller | | |
| 1991 | Death Dreams | George Westfield | | |
| 1991 | Fear and the Muse: The Story of Anna Akhmatova | Narrator (voice) | Documentary | |
| 1991 | Mending Hearts | Narrator | Documentary | |
| 1992 | Nightmare in the Daylight | Sean Farrell | | |
| 1992 | Mortal Sins | Father Thomas Cusack | | |
| 1992 | Last Ferry Home | Bill Turner | | |
| 1992 | Earth and the American Dream | Stuart Chase (voice) | Documentary | |
| 1993 | The Sea Wolf | Humphrey Van Weyden | | |
| 1995 | Above Suspicion | Dempsey Cain | | |
| 1996 | Without Pity: A Film About Abilities | Narrator (voice) | Documentary | |
| 1996 | A Step Toward Tomorrow | Denny Gabriel | | |
| 1997 | In the Gloaming | —N/a | Director | |
| 1998 | Rear Window | Jason Kemp | Also executive producer | |
| 1998 | Christopher Reeve: A Celebration of Hope | —N/a | Television special; executive producer | |
| 2002 | Christopher Reeve: Hope in Motion | Himself | Also known as Courageous Steps; documentary | |
| 2004 | The Brooke Ellison Story | —N/a | Posthumous release; director | |
| 2025 | Will Reeve: Finding My Father | Himself | Posthumous release; archive footage; television special | |

=== Television series ===
| Year | Title | Role | Notes | Ref. |
|---|---|---|---|---|
| 1974–1976 | Love of Life | Ben Harper | Series regular | |
| 1974 | Great Performances | Officer | Episode: "Enemies" | |
| 1975 | ABC Wide World of Mystery | Max 67 | Episode: "The Norming of Jack 243" | |
| 1980 | The Muppet Show | Himself / Guest Star | Episode: "Christopher Reeve" | |
| 1981–1985 | Saturday Night Live | Himself / Host | 3 episodes | |
| 1983 | Faerie Tale Theatre | Prince Charming / 'My son, the Prince' | Episode: "Sleeping Beauty" | |
| 1990 | HBO Storybook Musicals | It Zwibble (voice) | Episode: "Earthday Birthday" | |
| 1991 | Carol & Company | Rex / Bob | Episode: "Overnight Male" | |
| 1991 | The Carol Burnett Show | Himself | Episode #12.4 | |
| 1992 | Road to Avonlea | Robert Rutherford | Episode: "A Dark and Stormy Night" | |
| 1992 | Tales from the Crypt | Fred | Episode: "What's Cookin'" | |
| 1993 | Frasier | Leonard (voice) | Episode: "Space Quest" | |
| 1994 | The Unpleasant World of Penn & Teller | Himself | Episode #1.6 | |
| 1994 | The Lion and the Lamb | Storyteller (voice) | | |
| 1995 | Black Fox | Alan Johnson | Miniseries | |
| 1995 | In the Wild | Himself | Episode: "Grey Whales with Christopher Reeve" | |
| 2000 | Sesame Street | Himself | Episodes: "The Porridge Lovers Visit Sesame Street" & "A Day with Big Bird and the Birdketters" | |
| 2003 | The Practice | Kevin Healy | Episode: "Burnout"; also writer (story) | |
| 2003 | A History of US | —N/a | Creative consultant | |
| 2003–2004 | Smallville | Dr. Virgil Swann | Episodes: "Rosetta" & "Legacy" | |

== Stage ==
| Year | Title | Role | Venue | Ref. |
|---|---|---|---|---|
| 1968 | Iphigenia in Aulis | Soldier | Williamstown Theatre Festival (Note: Reeve was an apprentice at Williamstown Theatre Festival in 1968.) | |
| 1968 | Camino Real | Guard / Medical Student | Williamstown Theatre Festival | |
| 1968 | Galileo | Gentleman / Monk | Williamstown Theatre Festival | |
| 1968 | How to Succeed in Business Without Really Trying | Office Boy / Henchman | Williamstown Theatre Festival | |
| 1969 | The Hostage | Russian sailor | Loeb Drama Center | |
| 1969 | Death of a Salesman | Stanley | Loeb Drama Center | |
| 1969 | A Month in the Country | Beliaev | Loeb Drama Center | |
| 1969 | The Music Man | Traveling Salesman | McCarter Theatre | |
| 1970 | Private Lives | Victor Prynne | Boothbay Playhouse | |
| 1970 | Another Language | Jerry | Boothbay Playhouse | |
| 1970 | Roar Like a Dove | Bernard | Boothbay Playhouse | |
| 1970 | Ethan Frome | | Boothbay Playhouse | |
| 1971 | Forty Carats | Peter Latham | US tour | |
| 1972 | Richard III | Edward IV | Old Globe Theatre | |
| 1972 | The Merry Wives of Windsor | Fenton | Old Globe Theatre | |
| 1972 | Love's Labour's Lost | Dumaine | Old Globe Theatre | |
| 1973 | The Irregular Verb To Love | Michael Vickers | US tour | |
| 1974 | The Threepenny Opera | Macheath | Loeb Drama Center | |
| 1975 | Berchtesgaden | Young officer | Theater for the New City | |
| 1975 | Berkeley Square | Peter Standish | Manhattan Theatre Club | |
| 1975–1976 | A Matter of Gravity | Nicky | Broadhurst Theatre (Note: Tryouts in Philadelphia, Washington, New Haven, Boston, and Toronto.) | |
| 1977 | My Life | Grandfather | Circle Repertory Company | |
| 1980 | The Front Page | Hildy Johnson | Williamstown Theatre Festival | |
| 1980 | The Cherry Orchard | Yasha | Williamstown Theatre Festival | |
| 1980 | Fifth of July | Kenneth Talley, Jr. | New Apollo Theatre | |
| 1981 | The Greeks | Achilles | Williamstown Theatre Festival | |
| 1983 | Holiday | Ned Seton | Williamstown Theatre Festival | |
| 1984 | The Aspern Papers | Henry Jarvis | Theatre Royal Haymarket | |
| 1984 | Richard Cory | Richard Corey | Williamstown Theatre Festival | |
| 1985 | The Royal Family | Tony Cavendish | Williamstown Theatre Festival | |
| 1985 | The Marriage of Figaro | Count Almaviva | Circle in the Square Theatre | |
| 1986 | Summer and Smoke | John Buchanan Jr. | Williamstown Theatre Festival | |
| 1987 | The Rover | Willmore | Williamstown Theatre Festival | |
| 1987 | Mesmer | Dr. Anton Mesmer | Roundabout Theatre Company | |
| 1988 | Summer and Smoke | John Buchanan Jr. | Ahmanson Theatre | |
| 1988 | Mesmer | Dr. Anton Mesmer | Williamstown Theatre Festival | |
| 1989 | The Winter's Tale | Polixenes | The Public Theater | |
| 1989 | Company of Poets: A William Alfred Anthology | | Sanders Theater | |
| 1989 | John Brown's Body | Jack Ellyat / Clay Wingate | Williamstown Theatre Festival | |
| 1989 | Love Letters | Andrew Makepeace Ladd III | Promenade Theatre | |
| 1989 | Love Letters | Andrew Makepeace Ladd III | Theatre on the Square | |
| 1990 | Love Letters | Andrew Makepeace Ladd III | Canon Theatre | |
| 1990 | Love Letters | Andrew Makepeace Ladd III | Wilbur Theatre | |
| 1990 | Death Takes a Holiday | Death / Prince Nikolai Sirki | Williamstown Theatre Festival | |
| 1992 | The Guardsman | Nandor | Williamstown Theatre Festival | |
| 1993 | The Shadow Box | Brian | Temple of Music and Art | |
| 1994 | Love Letters | Andrew Makepeace Ladd III | Williamstown Theatre Festival | |
| 1994 | Allegro | Narrator | New York City Center | |

Unknown years

- As You Like It
- The Devil's Disciple
- Finian's Rainbow (McCarter Theatre)
- The Firebugs (McCarter Theatre)
- The Marriage of Figaro (McCarter Theatre)
- Much Ado About Nothing (McCarter Theatre)
- The Plough and the Stars (McCarter Theatre)
- South Pacific (McCarter Theatre)
- Troilus and Cressida (McCarter Theatre)
- The Way of the World (New York)

== Video games ==
| Year | Title | Voice role | Ref. |
|---|---|---|---|
| 1996 | 9: The Last Resort | Thurston Last | |

== Music videos ==
| Year | Track | Artist | Role | Ref. |
|---|---|---|---|---|
| 1989 | "On Our Own" | Bobby Brown | The Cyclist | |
| 1992 | "Heroína solitaria" | Pimpinela | Businessman | |

== Audiobooks ==
- Fatal Vision (Abridged) (1983) ISBN 0-399-12816-6 ASIN B001G6SR2K
- The Amateurs: The Story of Four Young Men and Their Quest for an Olympic Medal (Abridged) (1986) ISBN 0-688-04948-6 ASIN B0BRDFMF95
- Private Screening: A Novel (Abridged) (1995) ISBN 0-345-31139-6 ASIN B007BF4Z1M
- Still Me (Abridged) (1998) ISBN 0-375-40281-0
- Nothing Is Impossible: Reflections on a New Life (Unabridged) (2002) ISBN 0-375-50778-7 ASIN B00006SL48
