= Christopher Reeve =

American actor and activist (1952–2004)

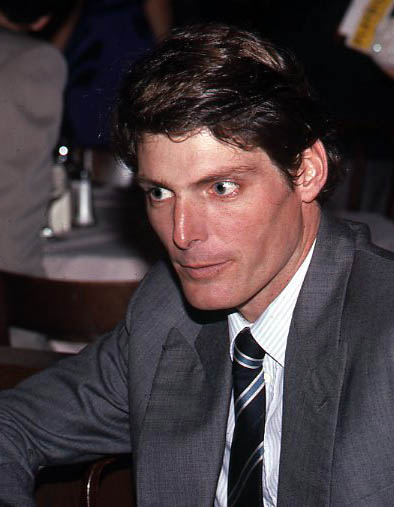
- Reeve in 1985
- Born: Christopher D'Olier Reeve; September 25, 1952; New York City, U.S.
- Died: October 10, 2004 (aged 52); Mount Kisco, New York, U.S.
- Education: Cornell University (BA)
- Occupations: Actor; activist; director; author
- Years active: 1970–2004
- Works: Full list
- Political party: Democratic
- Board member of: Christopher & Dana Reeve Foundation
- Spouse: Dana Morosini (m. 1992)
- Partner: Gae Exton (1977–1987)
- Children: Matthew; Alexandra; Will
- Father: F. D. Reeve
- Family: Franklin D'Olier (great-grandfather); Mahlon Pitney (great-grandfather); Beatrice Pitney Lamb (grandmother); Mary Schenck Woolman (great-great-grandaunt); Ferdinand Schureman Schenck (great-great-great-great-grandfather)
- Website: christopherreeve.org

Christopher D'Olier Reeve (September 25, 1952 – October 10, 2004) was an American actor, activist, director, and author. He amassed many stage and screen credits in his 34-year career, including playing the title character in the Superman film series (1978–1987). He won a British Academy Film Award, an Emmy Award, a Grammy Award and a Screen Actors Guild Award. He was also known for his activism.

Born in New York City and raised in Princeton, New Jersey, Reeve discovered a passion for acting and theater at age nine. He studied at Cornell University and the Juilliard School, making his Broadway debut in 1976. His breakthrough came with playing the title character in Superman (1978) and its three sequels (1980–1987). Afterwards, Reeve turned down multiple roles in big-budget movies, focusing instead on independent films and plays with complex characters. He appeared in critically successful films such as Somewhere in Time (1980), Deathtrap (1982), The Bostonians (1984), Street Smart (1987), and The Remains of the Day (1993), and in the plays Fifth of July on Broadway and The Aspern Papers in London's West End.

Beginning in the 1980s, Reeve was an activist for environmental and human-rights causes and for artistic freedom of expression. In 1995, Reeve was paralyzed from the neck down after being thrown from a horse during an equestrian competition in Culpeper, Virginia. He used a wheelchair and ventilator for the rest of his life. After his accident, he lobbied for spinal injury research, including human embryonic stem cell research, and for better insurance coverage for people with disabilities. His advocacy work included leading the Christopher & Dana Reeve Foundation and co-founding the Reeve-Irvine Research Center.

Reeve later directed In the Gloaming (1997), acted in a television remake of Rear Window (1998), and made two appearances in the Superman-themed television series Smallville (2003). He also wrote two autobiographical books: Still Me (1998) and Nothing Is Impossible: Reflections on a New Life (2002). Reeve died in 2004 from cardiac arrest at a hospital near his home in Westchester County, New York.

== Early life and education ==
Christopher Reeve was born in New York City to Barbara Pitney Lamb, an associate editor of Town Topics, and Franklin D'Olier Reeve, a teacher, novelist, poet, and scholar. Many of his ancestors had been in America since the early 17th century, some having been aboard the Mayflower. Through his mother, he was a 12th generation descendant of William Bradford, a pilgrim and five-time Governor of Plymouth Colony. Other ancestors of Reeve came from the French aristocracy. His maternal great-grandfather, Mahlon Pitney, was an associate justice of the U.S. Supreme Court from 1913 to 1922. For over 25 years, Reeve's paternal great-grandfather, Franklin D'Olier, was CEO of the Prudential Insurance Company. His grand-uncle, Franklin D'Olier Jr., was married to Margaret Winifred Lee, the maternal aunt of First Lady of the United States Jacqueline Kennedy Onassis.

Franklin and Barbara divorced in 1956, and she moved with Christopher and his younger brother, Benjamin, to Princeton, New Jersey, where they attended Nassau Street School and then Princeton Day School (PDS). Reeve's parents both remarried; he had five half-siblings and several step-siblings. Reeve excelled academically, athletically, and onstage; he was on the honor roll and played soccer, baseball, tennis, and hockey. He also played the piano and sang in the choir as a soprano.

Reeve had a difficult relationship with his father, Franklin. He wrote in 1998 that his father's "love for his children always seemed tied to performance" and he put pressure on himself to act older than he actually was to gain his father's approval. Between 1988 and 1995, the two barely spoke to each other, but they reconciled after Reeve's paralyzing accident.

Reeve found his passion for acting in 1962 at age nine when he was cast in an amateur version of the operetta The Yeomen of the Guard; it was the first of many student plays. His interest was solidified at age 15 when he spent a summer as an apprentice at the Williamstown Theatre Festival in Williamstown, Massachusetts.

After graduating from PDS in June 1970, Reeve acted in plays in Boothbay, Maine. He planned to go to New York City to find a career in theater, but at the advice of his mother, he applied for college. He was accepted into Princeton University, Columbia University, Brown University, Cornell University, Northwestern University, and Carnegie Mellon University. Reeve said that he chose Cornell primarily because it was distant from New York City and this would help him avoid the temptation of working as an actor immediately versus finishing college, as he had promised his mother and stepfather. Reeve joined the theater department in Cornell and played Pozzo in Waiting for Godot, Segismundo in Life Is a Dream, Hamlet in Rosencrantz and Guildenstern Are Dead, and Polixenes in The Winter's Tale.

Late in his first year, Reeve received a letter from Stark Hesseltine, a high-powered New York City agent who had discovered Robert Redford and who represented actors such as Richard Chamberlain, Michael Douglas, and Susan Sarandon. Hesseltine had seen Reeve in A Month in the Country and wanted to represent him. Reeve was excited and kept re-reading the letter to make sure of what it said. Reeve was impatient with school and eager to get on with his career. The two met, but Reeve was surprised to find Hesseltine strongly supported his promise to his mother and stepfather to complete college. They decided instead of dropping out of school, Reeve would come to New York once a month to meet casting agents and producers to find work for the summer vacation.

Reeve received favorable responses to his introductions and auditions arranged by Hesseltine but had to forgo several desirable opportunities because they began before school ended. In the summer, he toured in a production of Forty Carats with Eleanor Parker. The next year, Reeve received a full summer contract with the San Diego Shakespeare Festival, with roles as Edward IV in Richard III, Fenton in The Merry Wives of Windsor, and Dumaine in Love's Labour's Lost at the Old Globe Theatre.

Before his third year of college, Reeve took a three-month leave of absence. He traveled to Glasgow, Scotland, and saw theatrical productions throughout the United Kingdom. He was inspired by the actors there, and often had conversations with them in bars after their performances. He helped actors at The Old Vic with their American accents by reading the newspaper aloud for them. He then flew to Paris to study the French theater. Reeve spoke fluent French, having studied it from the third grade through his first year in Cornell. While there he spoke only French to immerse himself in French culture, and watched many performances.

After returning from Europe, Reeve chose to focus solely on acting, although Cornell had several general education requirements for graduation he had yet to complete. He managed to convince theater director John Clancy and the dean of the College of Arts and Sciences, as a theater major, he would achieve more at Juilliard (Group 4, 1973–1975) in New York City than at Cornell. They agreed that his first year at Juilliard would be counted as his senior year at Cornell.

In 1973, approximately 2,000 students auditioned for 20 places in the freshman class at Juilliard. Reeve's audition was in front of 10 faculty members, including John Houseman, who had just won an Academy Award for The Paper Chase. Reeve and Robin Williams were the only students selected for Juilliard's Advanced Program. They had several classes together in which they were the only students. In their dialects class with Edith Skinner, Williams had no trouble mastering all dialects naturally, whereas Reeve was more meticulous about it. Williams and Reeve developed a close friendship. Reeve was a godfather to Williams' eldest son Zachary.

In a meeting with Houseman, Reeve was told, "Mr. Reeve. It is terribly important that you become a serious classical actor. Unless, of course, they offer you a shitload of money to do something else." Houseman then offered him the chance to leave school and join the Acting Company, among performers such as Kevin Kline, Patti LuPone, and David Ogden Stiers. Reeve declined, as he had not yet received his bachelor's degree.

In early 1974, Reeve and other Juilliard students toured the New York City junior high school system and performed The Love Cure. In one performance, Reeve, who played the hero, drew his sword out too high and accidentally destroyed a row of lights above him. The students applauded and cheered. Reeve later said that this was the greatest ovation of his career. After completing his first year at Juilliard, Reeve graduated from Cornell in the Class of 1974 as a double major in English and music theory.

== Career ==
=== Early work ===
In 1974, Reeve auditioned for the soap opera Love of Life to pay tuition fees at Juilliard. Initially, he was promised a schedule that would not interfere with his studies. However, his character quickly gained popularity, leading to increased screen time. When Reeve reminded the producers of their agreement, they responded that it was not set in writing. The following year, Reeve had to leave Juilliard to fulfill his contract with CBS. He received an honorary Doctor of Fine Arts degree from Juilliard in 1997.

In between filming for the soap opera, Reeve took acting classes at the HB Studio and appeared in an Off-off-Broadway production of Berchtesgaden at the Theater for the New City. The play was directed by Barbara Loden, who became Reeve's mentor. She coached him not to play "on the nose", and he often followed that advice over the years. After that, he starred in a limited run of Berkeley Square at the Manhattan Theatre Club.

In late 1975, Reeve auditioned for the Broadway play A Matter of Gravity. Katharine Hepburn watched his audition and cast him as her character's grandson. With Hepburn's influence over CBS, Reeve worked out the schedules of the soap opera and the play so he would be able to do both. Because of his busy schedule, Reeve ate candy bars and drank coffee in place of meals and experienced exhaustion and malnutrition. At one of the performances, he entered the stage, said his first line, and then promptly fainted. Hepburn turned to the audience and said, "This boy's a goddamn fool. He doesn't eat enough red meat." The understudy finished the play for Reeve, and a doctor treated him. The doctor advised Reeve to eat a healthier diet. He stayed with the play for nine months and was given favorable reviews.

Reeve and Hepburn became very close. Some gossip columns rumored a romance between the two. Reeve said, "She was 67 and I was 22, but I thought that was quite an honor. ... I believe I was fairly close to what a child or grandchild might have been to her." Hepburn told him, "You're going to be a big star, Christopher, and support me in my old age." He replied, "I can't wait that long." Reeve said that his father, who was a professor of literature and came to many of the performances, was the man who most captivated Hepburn. When the play moved to Los Angeles in June 1976, Reeve—to Hepburn's disappointment—dropped out. They stayed in touch for years after the play's run. Reeve later regretted not staying closer and just sending messages back and forth.

Reeve's first role in a Hollywood film was a small part as a junior officer in the 1978 naval submarine disaster movie Gray Lady Down, starring Charlton Heston. He then acted in the play My Life at the Circle Repertory Company with friend William Hurt.

=== Superman films ===
Reeve as Superman

During the Off-Broadway production of My Life, Stark Hesseltine told Reeve he had been asked to audition for the leading role as Clark Kent/Superman in the big-budget film Superman (1978). Lynn Stalmaster, the casting director, put Reeve's picture and résumé on the top of the pile three separate times, only to have the producers throw it out each time. Through Stalmaster's persistent pleading, a meeting between director Richard Donner, producer Ilya Salkind, and Reeve was arranged. The morning after the meeting, Reeve was sent a 300-page script. He was thrilled that the script took the subject matter seriously, and that Donner's motto was verisimilitude. Hesseltine also told him that Marlon Brando was going to play Jor-El and Gene Hackman was going to play Lex Luthor. Reeve flew to London for a screen test, but he still did not believe he had much of a chance. On the plane ride, he imagined his approach to the role. He later said, "By the late 1970s, the masculine image had changed. ... Now it was acceptable for a man to show gentleness and vulnerability. ... I felt that the new Superman ought to reflect that contemporary male image." He based his portrayal of Clark Kent on Cary Grant's role in the 1938 film Bringing Up Baby. After the screen test, his driver said, "I'm not supposed to tell you this, but you've got the part."

Portraying Superman would be a stretch for the 24-year-old actor. He was 6 ft 4 in (193 cm) tall, but his physique was slim. Reeve went through an intense two-month training regimen with former British weightlifting champion David Prowse supervising. The training regimen consisted of running in the morning, followed by two hours of weightlifting and 90 minutes on the trampoline. He added 30-pound (14 kg) of muscle to his "thin" 188-pound (85 kg) frame. He later made even higher gains for Superman III (1983), though for Superman IV: The Quest for Peace (1987), he decided it would be healthier to focus more on cardiovascular workouts. One of the reasons Reeve could not work out as much for Superman IV was an emergency appendectomy that he had in June 1986.

Reeve was never a Superman or comic book fan, though he had watched Adventures of Superman starring George Reeves. Reeve found the role offered a suitable challenge because it was a dual role. He said, "there must be some difference stylistically between Clark and Superman. Otherwise, you just have a pair of glasses standing in for a character." Remembering Loden's earlier advice, Reeve also decided to "underplay" Superman: "I was six feet four, strong, and physically imposing; so I played against that, making him as casual as possible, letting the audience sense an implied power."

On the commentary track for the director's edition of Superman II: The Richard Donner Cut, creative consultant Tom Mankiewicz spoke of how Reeve had talked to him about playing Superman and then playing Clark Kent. Mankiewicz then corrected Reeve, telling him he was "always, always playing Superman" and when he was Clark Kent, he was "playing Superman who was playing Clark Kent." Mankiewicz described it to Reeve as a role within a role.

The film, made without the use of computers for special effects, was the first attempt to realistically show a person flying. Roy Field, the film's optical supervisor, said, "There were many techniques used to make Superman fly, but the best special effect of all was Christopher Reeve himself. We discovered very early on he, being a glider pilot, could hold his body aerodynamically. So when he got into the harness, the whole shot began to come alive."

The film grossed $300.2 million worldwide (unadjusted for inflation). Reeve received positive reviews for his performance:

- "Christopher Reeve's entire performance is a delight. Ridiculously good-looking, with a face as sharp and strong as an ax blade, his bumbling, fumbling Clark Kent and omnipotent Superman are simply two styles of gallantry and innocence." – Newsweek
- "Christopher Reeve has become an instant international star on the basis of his first major movie role, of Clark Kent/Superman. Film reviewers—regardless of their opinion of the film—have been almost unanimous in their praise of Reeve's dual portrayal. He is utterly convincing as he switches back and forth between personae." – Starlog

For his performance, Reeve won a BAFTA Award for Most Promising Newcomer to Leading Film Roles. He described Superman as "the closest opportunity I've had to playing a classical role on film, the closest expression to something of mythical dimension." His co-star Margot Kidder said after his death that, with the Superman films, Reeve "knew he'd done something meaningful. He was very aware of that and very happy with that role."

Much of Superman II was filmed at the same time as the first film. In fact, the original plan had been for the film to be a single three-hour epic comprising both parts. After most of the footage had been shot, the producers had a disagreement with Donner over various matters, including money and special effects, and Donner was fired. Director Richard Lester, who had worked with the producers previously on the two-parter The Three Musketeers (1973) and The Four Musketeers (1974), replaced Donner. Lester had the script changed and re-shot some footage. The cast was unhappy, but Reeve later said he liked Lester and considered Superman II to be his favorite of the series. Donner's version of Superman II, titled Superman II: The Richard Donner Cut, was released on DVD in November 2006 and was dedicated in memory of Reeve.

Lester directed Superman III, released in 1983, solo. Reeve believed the producers Alexander Salkind, his son Ilya Salkind, and Pierre Spengler had decreased the credibility of Superman III by turning it into a Richard Pryor comedy rather than a proper Superman film. Reeve missed Donner and believed Superman III's only really good element was the automobile junkyard scene in which Evil Superman fights Good Clark Kent in an internal battle. Reeve's portrayal of the Evil Superman was highly praised, though the film was critically panned.

Superman IV: The Quest for Peace was released in 1987. After Superman III, Reeve vowed that he was done with Superman. However, he agreed to continue the role in a fourth film on the condition he would have partial creative control over the script. The nuclear disarmament plot was his idea. Cannon Films purchased the production rights to the character of Superman from the Salkinds in the mid-1980s. Cannon Films were known for low-budget, poorly acted, poorly scripted action films. They cut the budget of Superman IV in half to $17 million. The film was both a critical failure and a box-office disappointment, becoming the lowest-grossing Superman film to date. Reeve later said, "the less said about Superman IV the better." Both of Reeve's children from his relationship with Gae Exton had uncredited appearances in a deleted scene in which Superman rescues a girl, played by his daughter Alexandra, and reunites her with her brother, played by his son Matthew, after Nuclear Man creates a tornado in Smallville.

Reeve would have made a fifth Superman film after the rights to the character reverted to the Salkinds and Spengler if the film had a budget of the same size as Superman: The Movie. Although there was potential for such a film in the late 1980s after Cannon Films went bankrupt, Reeve never received a script.

In 1993, two years before Reeve's accident, the Salkinds sold the rights to the character of Superman again, this time to Warner Bros. "There was supposed to be a fifth Superman movie titled Superman Reborn, but because of studio shifts, the terrible box office [Superman IV] got, and ... Reeves's [sic] accident, it never saw the light of day."

=== 1980s ===
Reeve's first role after 1978's Superman was in the 1980 time-travel mystery/romantic fantasy Somewhere in Time. Reeve as playwright Richard Collier romanced Elise McKenna, a popular stage actress from the early 20th century, played by Jane Seymour. The film was shot on Mackinac Island using the Grand Hotel in mid-1979, and was Reeve's favorite film to shoot.

The original plan was for a limited release and to build word of mouth, but early test screenings were favorable and the studio decided on a wide release, which proved to be the wrong strategy. Early reviews savaged the film as unduly sentimental and melodramatic, and an actors' strike prevented Reeve and Seymour from doing publicity. The film quickly closed, although Jean-Pierre Dorléac was nominated for the Academy Award for Best Costume Design in 1980. However, thanks to screenings on cable networks and video rentals, the film became a cult classic. INSITE (International Network of Somewhere in Time Enthusiasts) did fundraising to sponsor a star on the Hollywood Walk of Fame for Reeve in 1997, and raised over $20,000 for the Christopher & Dana Reeve Foundation. Seymour became a friend of Reeve, and in 1995, named one of her twin sons Kristopher in his honor (Reeve also became his godfather). The Grand Hotel and Mackinac Island has become a popular tourist site for film fans.

In that same year, Reeve made a guest appearance on The Muppet Show, where he performed "East of the Sun (and West of the Moon)" on a piano for Miss Piggy, who had a crush on him. Reeve denied being Superman but displayed the character's superpowers throughout the episode. He then returned to continue filming on the not yet finished production of Superman II.

After finishing Superman II, Reeve called Nikos Psacharopoulos, the artistic director of the Williamstown Theatre Festival, whom he knew since his apprentice days, and asked if he could join the company. Reeve did two plays that season: The Front Page and The Cherry Orchard. The former, directed by Robert Allan Ackerman, became one of the biggest successes of the summer. From then on, he was a regular at the festival. Later in the year, Reeve played a disabled Vietnam veteran in Lanford Wilson's play Fifth of July on Broadway to excellent reviews. To prepare for the role, he was coached by an amputee on how to walk on artificial legs. The production was nominated for five Tony Awards, including Best Play. In 1981, Reeve returned to Williamstown to play Achilles in the two-part, six-hour production of The Greeks.

In 1982, Reeve stretched his acting range further and played a devious novice playwright with questionable motives regarding his idol and mentor Michael Caine, in Sidney Lumet's suspenseful dark comedy Deathtrap, based on the play by Ira Levin. The film was well received, but a major plot twist was spoiled by the press, affecting its box office performance. The same year, Reeve portrayed corrupt Catholic priest John Flaherty making challenging decisions during World War II in Frank Perry's Monsignor. Reeve felt this gave him the opportunity to play "a morally ambiguous character who was neither clearly good nor clearly bad, someone to whom life is much more complex than the characters I've played previously." Reeve blamed the failure of the film on poor editing. He said, "the movie is sort of a series of outrageous incidents that you find hard to believe. Since they don't have a focus, and since they aren't justified and explained, they become laughable."

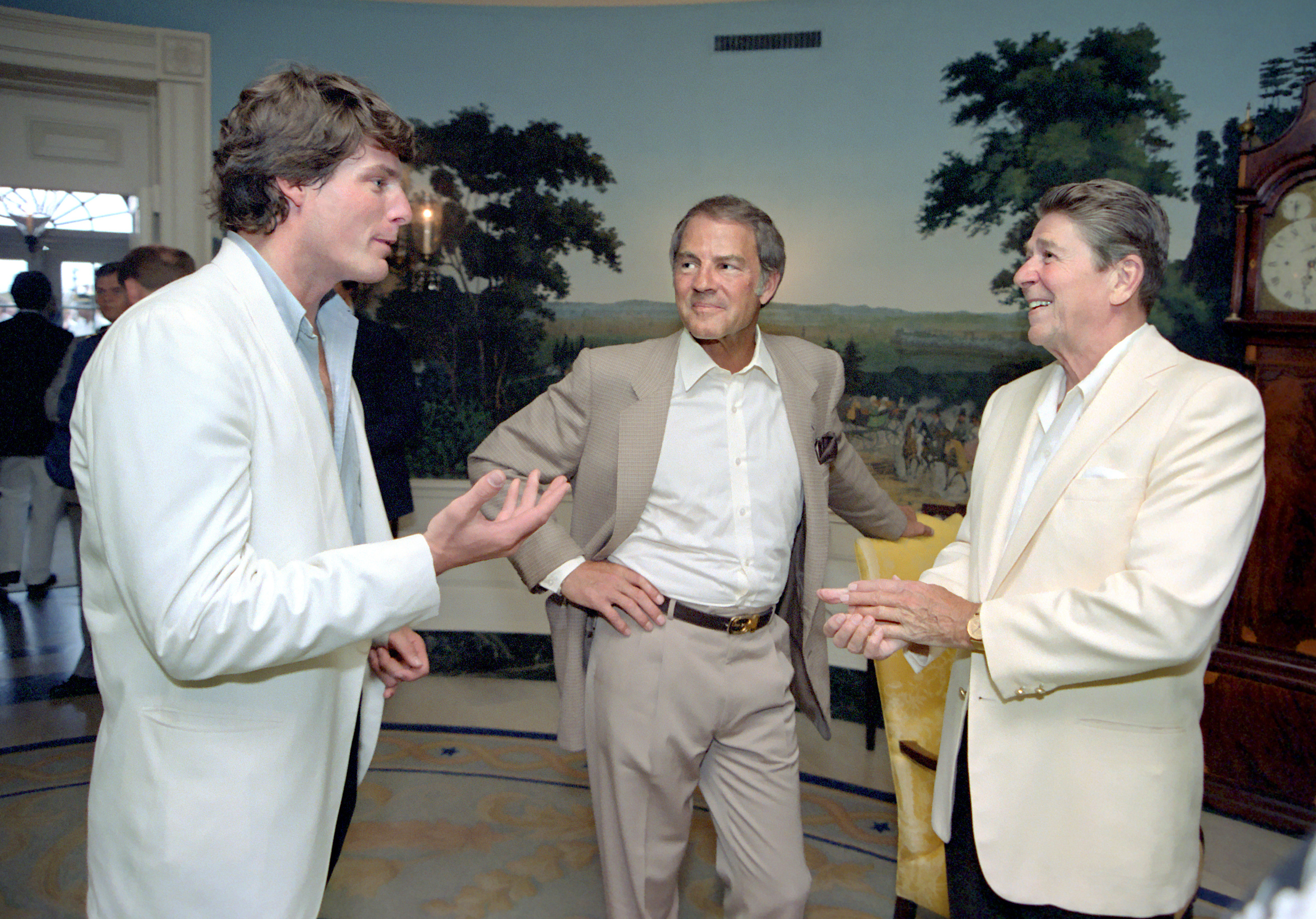
Reeve with Frank Gifford and President Ronald Reagan at a reception and picnic marking the 15th anniversary of the Special Olympics program in the Diplomatic Reception room of the White House, June 1983

In 1983, Reeve appeared in Shelley Duvall's Faerie Tale Theatre, playing the dual roles of Prince Charming and the cowardly prince in Sleeping Beauty. In Williamstown, he acted in the play Holiday. Later that year, Reeve went to Kranjska Gora, Slovenia, to work on the film The Aviator. The producers approached him without knowing he could fly a Stearman, the vintage biplane used in the film. He readily accepted the role and volunteered to do his own piloting to achieve a more realistic look. The film was released in March 1985.

Reeve was then offered the role of Basil Ransom in 1984's The Bostonians alongside Vanessa Redgrave. Though Reeve ordinarily commanded over one million dollars per film, Ismail Merchant could only afford to pay him one-tenth of that. Reeve had no complaints, as this was exactly the kind of film he wanted to do. In a 2005 interview, James Ivory said that Merchant Ivory Productions did not have good representatives at the time, so Reeve "brokered" the arrangements with the CAA to get them into the agency. The film exceeded expectations and performed well at the box office for what was considered to be an art house film. The New York Times ranked it "among the finest film adaptations of a classic novel that anyone has yet made."

Ivory thought that Reeve was "wonderful" in The Bostonians, but that he was "really undervalued by the critics and even the awards" because "they were so used to thinking of him as Superman." Hepburn called Reeve to tell him he was "absolutely marvelous" and "captivating" in the film. When he told her he was currently shooting the 1985 version of Anna Karenina, she said, "Oh, that's a terrible mistake." Reeve reunited with Redgrave in the play The Aspern Papers during its 1984 run in London's West End. In Williamstown, he played the title role in Richard Cory.

In March 1985, Reeve starred as Count Vronsky in the television film Anna Karenina, opposite Jacqueline Bisset. Reeve's daughter, Alexandra, also appeared in the film as his character's 10-month-old daughter, taking her first steps. It was for this film that Reeve learned to ride horses and decided to take up the sport seriously upon returning home. In April, Reeve hosted an episode of Saturday Night Live. He then returned to the stage, playing Tony in The Royal Family in Williamstown and the Count in a modern adaptation of The Marriage of Figaro on Broadway. Reeve also hosted the television documentary Dinosaur!, which was filmed at the American Museum of Natural History. It was one of the earliest prime-time specials on prehistoric life and won the Emmy Award for Outstanding Special Visual Effects. Also in 1985, DC Comics named Reeve as one of the honorees in the company's 50th-anniversary publication, Fifty Who Made DC Great, for his work on the Superman film series.

In 1986, Reeve was still struggling to find scripts he liked. A script named Street Smart had been lying in his house for years, and after re-reading it, he took it to Cannon Films. They agreed to produce it on the condition that he play Superman in at least one more sequel for them. Reeve starred opposite Morgan Freeman, who was nominated for his first Academy Award for the film. It received excellent reviews but performed poorly at the box office, possibly because Cannon Films had failed to properly advertise it. Back in Williamstown, Reeve began building a house and starred in Summer and Smoke alongside Laila Robins.

After the filming of Superman IV in February 1987, Reeve and Exton separated and Reeve returned to New York. In a depression over his personal life, he thought doing a comedy might be good for him and agreed to appear in Switching Channels. However, Burt Reynolds and Kathleen Turner had a feud during filming, which made the time even more unbearable for Reeve. He later stated that he made a fool of himself in the film and most of his time was spent refereeing between Reynolds and Turner. In her 2008 memoir, Turner wrote, "Burt and I were sworn enemies. ... It was not happy shooting at all. I was absolutely miserable. If the crew hadn't been so kind, and Chris Reeve, who was so very nice, hadn't been there in the cast, it might have been impossible." The film did poorly, and Reeve believed it marked the end of his movie star career. In June, he appeared in the British television special charity event The Grand Knockout Tournament and then went to Williamstown to rehearse for the play The Rover. On June 30, Reeve met his future wife Dana Morosini. In November, he did a stage reading of Joel Gross' new play Mesmer on Broadway.

In 1988, Reeve played Major Johnnie Dodge in the two-part television film The Great Escape II: The Untold Story. Like the 1963 film, the first part tells the story of the mass escape of Allied POWs from a German camp in 1944. The second part depicts the search and prosecution of those responsible for the murder of 50 escapees, which was not covered in the 1963 film. However, for most of 1988 and 1989, Reeve worked onstage. He starred in another production of Summer and Smoke, this time with Christine Lahti, at the Ahmanson Theatre. In Williamstown, he reunited with Madeleine Potter in Mesmer.

In 1989, Reeve played Polixenes in an Off-Broadway production of The Winter's Tale. In Williamstown, he played the lead in John Brown's Body, in which Dana also had a small role. Reeve was part of a rotating cast in John Tillinger's production of Love Letters at the Promenade Theatre; with Julie Hagerty, he also performed in San Francisco, Los Angeles and Boston in 1989 and 1990. Reeve auditioned for the Richard Gere role in Pretty Woman but walked out on the audition because they had a half-hearted casting director fill in for Julia Roberts.

=== 1990s ===
In 1990, Reeve starred in the American Civil War film The Rose and the Jackal, in which he played Allan Pinkerton, the head of President Lincoln's new Secret Service. In Williamstown, he played Death/Prince Nikolai Sirki in the play Death Takes a Holiday.

In the early 1990s, Reeve was cast as a villain in three television films almost in a row: Bump in the Night (1991), Death Dreams (1991), and Nightmare in the Daylight (1992). The most notable of these was Bump in the Night, in which Reeve played a child molester who abducts a young boy. The movie received fair to positive reviews. Reeve felt it was important for parents of young children to see the film.

In 1992, Reeve played one of the leads in Peter Bogdanovich's comedy Noises Off. In a 2020 book Picturing Peter Bogdanovich: My Conversations with the New Hollywood Director, Bogdanovich said, "[Reeve] was very good in that. He was good at comedy. I could tell that from the first Superman. He was my only choice for that part." In another television film, Mortal Sins, Reeve for the second time played a Catholic priest, this time hearing the confessions of a serial murderer in a role reminiscent of Montgomery Clift in Alfred Hitchcock's I Confess. He also acted in the short film Last Ferry Home. Reeve's last performance in a proper stage production was The Guardsman in Williamstown that year.

In the spring of 1992, Reeve attended the US premiere of Howards End where he met Ivory again. The next day, Ivory called him and offered him a role in his new film, The Remains of the Day (1993). The script was one of the best he had read, and he unhesitatingly took the part. The film was deemed an instant classic and was nominated for eight Academy Awards. At the 2024 screening of the film, Ivory praised Reeve's performance, saying, "He was a great guy... a very, very good actor who got trapped in Superman." According to Reeve's son Will, The Remains of the Day is the film that his father was most proud of.

In 1993, Reeve starred opposite Charles Bronson in the television film The Sea Wolf, based on Jack London's novel of the same name. After that, he traveled to Canada to shoot a miniseries, Black Fox, co-starring Tony Todd. CBS released it as three films two months after Reeve's accident in 1995. Scenes of Reeve riding are featured heavily in the story. Reeve's children, Matthew and Alexandra, appear briefly in the background in the first film.

During this period, Superman's grip on Reeve's career gradually began to loosen. In a review for Morning Glory (1993), one critic wrote: "Those who can't take Reeve seriously unless he's wearing a blue suit and a red cape will find themselves pleasantly surprised by the heft and subtlety he brings to his [role]. … This movie isn't big enough to make Reeve a star again. But the impression he makes here is good enough to suggest that a reversal of perception—and fortune—won't be long in coming." Another critic said in a review for Speechless (1994): "Mr. Reeve has quietly evolved into a versatile character actor… It's only a matter of time before he is 'officially' rediscovered and celebrated, like John Travolta in Pulp Fiction." Reeve considered The Rose and the Jackal, Morning Glory, and The Sea Wolf some of his best work.

In 1994, Reeve did a reading of Love Letters in Williamstown, and also appeared as a narrator in a concert version of the musical Allegro at the New York City Center. These became his last performances onstage. The following year, Reeve starred in John Carpenter's Village of the Damned, a remake of the 1960 British movie of the same name. Both films were based on the 1957 novel The Midwich Cuckoos by John Wyndham. For Carpenter, the film was a contractual obligation, but "it has a very good performance from Christopher Reeve, so there's some value in it." Village of the Damned was Reeve's final feature film to be released in theaters. Shortly before his accident, Reeve played a paralyzed police officer in the HBO movie Above Suspicion. He did research at a rehabilitation hospital in Van Nuys "on what it would be like to be a paraplegic." Reeve's injury occurred less than a week after the premiere of the film.

Reeve also made several guest appearances in television shows: Carol & Company in 1991, Road to Avonlea and Tales from the Crypt in 1992. He accepted an offer to appear in Road to Avonlea without reading the script because Colleen Dewhurst, with whom he was close, spoke highly of the show. Reeve's episode in Tales from the Crypt, "What's Cookin'", is considered one of the best in the series. He was also one of the celebrity guest callers on Frasier in 1993.

Before his injury, Reeve was offered the lead in the 1995 film Kidnapped. He also planned to direct his first film for the big screen, a romantic comedy entitled Tell Me True. Both plans were cancelled as a result of the horse-riding accident that left him paralyzed.

In 1996, Reeve narrated the HBO documentary Without Pity: A Film About Abilities. The film won the Emmy Award for Outstanding Informational Special. He then acted in a small role in the film A Step Toward Tomorrow. The following year, Reeve made his directorial debut with the HBO film In the Gloaming with Robert Sean Leonard, Glenn Close, Whoopi Goldberg, Bridget Fonda, and David Strathairn. The film was nominated for five Emmy Awards, including Outstanding Directing for a Miniseries or Special, and won four awards out of the six it was nominated for at the CableACE Awards. Dana said, "There's such a difference in his outlook, his health, his overall sense of well-being when he's working at what he loves, which is creative work."

In early 1998, Reeve persuaded Disney CEO Michael Eisner to give a two-hour prime-time slot on ABC to a spinal cord research fundraiser. The special focused on inspiring stories of people with disabilities, as well as performances by disabled artists. Reeve said, "To put two hours about spinal cord injury on prime-time TV is unheard of. We wanted to make it a celebration of life. Show the triumphs that can happen." Numerous celebrities lent their support, including Robin Williams, Tom Hanks, Meryl Streep, Glenn Close, Stevie Wonder, Willie Nelson, Gloria Estefan, and many others. A Celebration of Hope received an Emmy nomination for Outstanding Variety, Music or Comedy Special.

On April 25, 1998, Random House published Reeve's autobiography, Still Me. The book spent 11 weeks on the New York Times Best Seller list. Reeve narrated the abridged audiobook, which won him the Grammy Award for Best Spoken Word Album, the Audie Award for Solo Narration by the Author, and the Earphones Award from AudioFile. The paperback edition with a new afterword was released the following year and spent an additional two weeks on the Best Seller list.

Also in 1998, Reeve starred in and served as executive producer of Rear Window, a remake of Hitchcock's 1954 film. He was nominated for a Golden Globe and won a Screen Actors Guild Award for his performance.

=== 2000s ===
In 2000, Reeve made guest appearances on the PBS series Sesame Street. In September 2002, Random House published his second book, Nothing Is Impossible: Reflections on a New Life. This book is shorter than Still Me and focuses on Reeve's world views and the life experiences which helped shape them. The book spent three weeks on the New York Times Best Seller list. Reeve narrated an unabridged audiobook for which he received his second Grammy nomination for Best Spoken Word Album.

In 2001, Reeve's son Matthew began filming a three-part series detailing Reeve's recovery process and advocacy for spinal cord injury research. The first film, Hope in Motion, aired on ABC in September 2002 under the title Courageous Steps. It received an Emmy nomination for Outstanding Nonfiction Special. In February 2003, it was broadcast on BBC One under its original title. Following Reeve's death in 2004, a third film was never made, while Hope in Motion and its follow-up, Choosing Hope, were released on DVD in 2007.

In 2003, Reeve guest-starred in an episode of The Practice. He submitted a story treatment to the show's creator, David E. Kelley, that addresses the issues of health insurance policy and caregiver burnout. Kelley liked the idea and wrote an episode based on it.

Reeve's final acting role was in the television series Smallville portraying Dr. Virgil Swann. On February 25, 2003, he made an appearance in the episode "Rosetta", in which Dr. Swann informs Clark Kent (Tom Welling) about his origins. The scenes of Reeve and Welling feature music cues from 1978's Superman, composed by John Williams and arranged by Mark Snow. At the end of the episode, Reeve and Welling appeared in a short spot inviting people to support the Christopher Reeve Paralysis Foundation. (Note: Short spots in support of the foundation were also shown at the end of: "Legacy" (Reeve and Welling), "Aqua" (Annette O'Toole), "Progeny" (Erica Durance), and "Cure" (Dean Cain).) "Rosetta" set ratings history for The WB. The fan community met the episode with rave reviews and praised it as being among the series' best to this day. Reeve also appeared in the episode "Legacy", in which he reunited with fellow stage actor John Glover, who played Lionel Luthor in the show.

In 2004, Reeve directed the A&E film The Brooke Ellison Story. The film is based on the true story of Brooke Ellison, the first quadriplegic to graduate from Harvard University. Reeve during this time was directing the animated film Everyone's Hero. It was one of his dream projects and he died during the middle of production for the film. Reeve's wife Dana helped out, and his son Will was a cast member in the film. Dana and Will also had small roles in The Brooke Ellison Story.

=== Roles turned down by Reeve ===
Following the first Superman movie, Reeve realized Hollywood producers wanted him to be an action star. He later said, "I found most of the scripts of the genre poorly constructed, and I felt the starring roles could easily be played by anyone with a strong physique." Reeve also did not feel he was right for the other films he was offered and turned down the lead roles in American Gigolo, The World According to Garp, Splash, Fatal Attraction, Romancing the Stone, Lethal Weapon, and Body Heat. Hepburn recommended Reeve to David Lean for the role of Fletcher Christian in The Bounty, starring Anthony Hopkins. After considering it, Reeve decided that he would be miscast, and the film was eventually made with Mel Gibson. In the 1990s, Reeve received scripts for Picket Fences and Chicago Hope and was asked by CBS if he wanted to start his own television series. This would have meant moving to Los Angeles, which Reeve did not want to do. He declined the offers. After his accident, Reeve was offered the role of Mason Verger in Ridley Scott's Hannibal. He turned it down upon learning that the character was a paralyzed and facially disfigured child molester. The role went to Gary Oldman.

== Personal life ==
=== Relationships ===
Reeve's first romantic relationship was at age 16 with a theater actress who was seven years his senior. Eventually, he began to feel that "something about it didn't feel right", and they split up.

While filming the first two Superman movies in England, Reeve began a 10-year relationship with modeling executive Gae Exton. In 2018, Jane Seymour revealed that Reeve and Exton had broken up prior to filming Somewhere in Time, and during production, Reeve and Seymour fell in love. However, Reeve returned to Exton upon learning that she was pregnant with their son Matthew Exton Reeve, who was born on December 20, 1979. Their second child, daughter Alexandra Reeve Givens, was born on November 25, 1983. Both were born in London. In February 1987, Reeve and Exton separated amicably with joint custody of their children, and Reeve returned to New York. Matthew and Alexandra remained in London with their mother and spent their holidays with Reeve. Matthew, who graduated from Brown University in 2002, is a writer, director, and producer. Alexandra graduated from Yale University in 2005 and received a Juris Doctor from Columbia Law School in 2008. She is a lawyer and CEO of the Center for Democracy and Technology. Alexandra's son is named Christopher after her father.

In June 1987, Reeve met his future wife Dana Morosini, a singer and actress. By 1990, they were living together, but Reeve, remembering his parents' painful divorce and other failed marriages in his family, could not bring himself to commit. After they almost broke up, Reeve began about a year of therapy, primarily to talk through his fears about marriage. Then one night during dinner, he said, "I just put down my fork and asked her to marry me." They got married in April 1992, and their son Will Reeve was born on June 7, 1992. Will graduated from Middlebury College in 2014 and, as of 2025, he reports for ABC News. Christopher and Dana Reeve remained married until Christopher's death.

=== Aviation and sailing ===
Reeve was a licensed pilot and began reaching milestones in his early 20s: private, instrument, multi-engine, commercial, instructor, and glider. In 1976, Reeve purchased his first aircraft, a second-hand Cherokee 140. After his paralyzing accident, he fondly recalled sleeping under its wings during a solo trip across Canada. Over the years, he owned an A36 Bonanza, a Beechcraft Baron, a Cheyenne II, and a sailplane. Reeve flew solo across the Atlantic twice and was a pilot for the Environmental Air Force.

When Robin Williams was filming The World According to Garp, Glenn Close recalled that Reeve would "literally swoop in, piloting his own plane, scoop Robin up, and away they would fly for the weekend." During the shooting of Superman III, Reeve joined The Tiger Club, a group of aviators who pilot vintage de Havilland Tiger Moth biplanes. Reeve knew how to fly a Stearman and did his own piloting in the film The Aviator. He also enjoyed gliding; his personal record was 32,000 ft.

Reeve was an avid sailor. While filming The Bostonians, he lived aboard his Swan 40, Chandelle, and would take the cast and crew sailing on the weekends. In 1989, he sold Chandelle and bought a sloop sailboat, Cambria 46, which he named the Sea Angel. According to David Walters Yachts, "when Chris Reeve came to build a Cambria, he did not want a double entry 44. A new deck mold with a single entry was built, and was designated the new 46 model."

Reeve sailed in the Caribbean and to Bermuda a few times. The coast of New England is what he knew best, sailing "all over the East, Nova Scotia, and Maine." His favorite ports were Nantucket, Yarmouth, and Christmas Cove in Maine.

=== Equestrianism and injury ===
Reeve began his involvement in horse riding in 1985 after learning to ride for the film Anna Karenina. He was initially allergic to horses, so he took antihistamines. He trained on Martha's Vineyard, and by 1989, he began eventing. His allergies soon disappeared.

Reeve purchased a 12-year-old American thoroughbred horse named Eastern Express, nicknamed "Buck", while filming Village of the Damned. He trained with Buck in 1994 and planned to do Training Level events in 1995 and move up to Preliminary in 1996. Though Reeve had originally signed up to compete at an event in Vermont, his coach invited him to go to the Commonwealth Dressage and Combined Training Association finals at the Commonwealth Park equestrian center in Culpeper, Virginia. Reeve finished in fourth place out of 27 in the dressage, before walking his cross-country course. He was concerned about jumps 16 and 17 but paid little attention to the third jump, which was a routine one-metre-tall (3.3 ft) fence shaped like the letter "W".

On May 27, 1995, Reeve's horse made a refusal. Witnesses said the horse began the third fence jump and suddenly stopped. Reeve pitched forward off the horse, holding on to the reins. His hands became tangled in them, and the bridle and bit were pulled off the horse. (Note: Afterward, Buck was boarding at Gathering Farm in Hamilton, Massachusetts. Reeve regularly called the stables to check on him and was sent videos of his training sessions. Later, Buck was sold to new owners. Reeve said, "He's a beautiful, sweet-natured animal. None of what happened was his fault. ... I'm hoping he'll have a long and happy life with his new owners. He's a wonderful horse.") He landed head first on the far side of the fence, shattering his first and second vertebrae. The resulting cervical spinal injury paralyzed him from the neck down and halted his breathing. Paramedics arrived three minutes later and immediately took measures to get air into his lungs. He was taken first to the local hospital, before being flown by helicopter to the University of Virginia Medical Center. He had no recollection of the accident.

=== Hospitalization ===
After five days in which Reeve was heavily medicated and delirious, he regained full consciousness. His doctor explained to him that his first and second cervical vertebrae had been destroyed and his spinal cord damaged. He was paralyzed from the neck down and unable to breathe without a ventilator.

Reeve's first thoughts when informed about the seriousness of his injury was he had ruined his life, would be a burden on his family, and it might be best to "slip away". He mouthed to his wife Dana, "Maybe we should let me go." She tearfully replied, "I will support whatever you want to do, because this is your life and your decision. But I want you to know that I'll be with you for the long haul, no matter what. You're still you. And I love you." In what she would later describe as a "sales ploy", she also told him that if he still wanted to die in two years they could reconsider the question.

After this conversation, and visits from his children in which he saw how much they needed him, Reeve consented to lifesaving surgery and treatment for pneumonia. He never considered euthanasia as an option again.

Reeve went through inner anguish in the ICU, particularly when he was alone during the night. His upcoming operation to stabilize his spine in June 1995 "was frightening to contemplate. ... I already knew that I had only a fifty-fifty chance of surviving the surgery. ... Then, at an especially bleak moment, the door flew open and in hurried a squat fellow with a blue scrub hat and a yellow surgical gown and glasses, speaking in a Russian accent. He announced that he was my proctologist, and that he had to examine me immediately." It was Robin Williams, reprising his character from the film Nine Months. "For the first time since the accident, I laughed. My old friend had helped me know that somehow I was going to be okay." (Note: After Reeve's accident, some media outlets published a story about a college pact in which the two vowed to take care of each other. Both Reeve and Williams said the story was untrue. Williams also denied reports that he was paying Reeve's medical bills: "I've done some things, but [the press] made it seem like I'm footing all the bills.") In addition to visits from friends and family, Reeve received over 400,000 letters from all over the world, which gave him great comfort during his recovery. (Note: In 1999, Dana published about 200 selected letters, with the permission of their authors, in her book, Care Packages: Letters to Christopher Reeve from Strangers and Other Friends. ISBN 0-375-50076-6.)

John A. Jane performed surgery to repair Reeve's neck vertebrae. He put wires underneath both laminae and used bone from Reeve's hip to fit between the C1 and C2 vertebrae. He inserted a titanium pin and fused the wires with the vertebrae, then drilled holes in Reeve's skull and fitted the wires through to secure the skull to the spinal column. To access the cord, the surgeon had to cut a tendon on the right side of Reeve's neck, which became shorter and less flexible as a result, causing his head to tilt slightly to the right.

=== Rehabilitation ===
After a month in the hospital, Reeve spent six months at the Kessler Rehabilitation Center in West Orange, New Jersey, to continue with his recovery and learn skills such as operating his sip-and-puff electric wheelchair by blowing air through a straw. In his autobiography Still Me, he described initially not wanting to face the reality of his disability. Getting used to sitting strapped into a wheelchair or taking a shower was initially terrifying. Reeve developed a deep fondness for many of the staff at Kessler, and through conversations with the other patients gradually started to see himself as being part of the disabled community. (Note: In September 1995, The Journey of Christopher Reeve aired on ABC News' 20/20. Featuring in-depth interviews with Reeve and Dana, and showing his rehabilitation process at Kessler, the special became a winner of the Peabody Awards.)

For the first few months after the accident, Reeve relied on a ventilator, which was connected to his neck through a tracheostomy tube, for every breath. With therapy and practice, he developed the ability to breathe on his own for up to 90 minutes at a time.

At home, Reeve exercised for up to four or five hours a day, using specialized exercise machines to stimulate his muscles and prevent muscle atrophy and osteoporosis. He believed that intense physical therapy could regenerate the nervous system, and also wanted his body to be strong enough to support itself if a cure for paralysis were found.

Beginning in 2000, Reeve started to regain the ability to make small movements with his fingers and other parts of his body. By 2002, he could feel the prick of a needle and sense hot and cold temperatures on 65% of his body. Reeve regularly exercised in a swimming pool and could push off with his legs from the side of a pool and make a snow angel movement with his arms. He also had a sense of proprioception, which is critical for movement control. Initially, Reeve was given an A grade on the ASIA Impairment Scale, indicating no motor or sensory function. In 2002, his grade was changed to C, indicating some degree of muscle movement and sensation. Reeve's doctors were surprised by his improvements, which they attributed to his intensive exercise regimen. The degree of his recovery was reported in scientific journals.

In February 2003, Reeve became the third patient in the United States to undergo an experimental procedure in which electrodes were implanted in his diaphragm to help him breathe without a ventilator. Previously, he could force air into his lungs using his neck muscles, which required a lot of effort. With a diaphragm pacing device, he was able to breathe normally through his nose, regaining his sense of smell and normal speech. At first, the device allowed him to breathe for 15 minutes an hour, but over time this increased up to 18 hours a day. In November 2003, Reeve appeared in public without a ventilator for the first time since his accident.

=== Life with paralysis ===
In December 1995, Reeve moved back to his home in Bedford, New York. By two years after the accident, Reeve said he was "glad to be alive, not out of obligation to others, but because life was worth living." He continued to require round-the-clock care for the rest of his life, with a rotating team of 10 nurses and five aides working in his home. (Note: The nursing care was covered by Reeve's insurance after much struggle with the insurance company, while he paid for the aides himself.)

In the aftermath of the accident, Reeve went through intense grief. He gradually resolved to make the best of his new life, with a busy schedule of activism, film work, writing and promoting his books, public speaking, and parenting. In 1998, he said in an interview:

Who knows why an accident happens? The key is what do you do afterwards. There is a period of shock, and then grieving, with confusion and loss. After that, you have two choices. One is to stare out the window and gradually disintegrate. And the other is to mobilize and use all your resources, whatever they may be, to do something positive. That is the road I have taken. It comes naturally to me. I am a competitive person and right now I am competing against decay. I don't want osteoporosis or muscle atrophy or depression to beat me.

In another interview, Reeve said he drew on the self-discipline he had gained in his early years in the theater:

Nobody wants another actor. There's too many of them now already. ... To keep believing in yourself in spite of those kinds of obstacles is certainly good preparation for what I'm going through now.

=== Religious views ===
Reeve attended his stepfather's Presbyterian church as a teenager, but until the last years of his life did not identify with any religion. In 1975, he briefly explored Scientology, but chose not to become a member, and subsequently voiced criticism of the organization.

Reeve described his wedding in 1992 as his "first act of faith". After his accident, many well-wishers suggested that prayer would make him feel better, but he did not find it helpful. "I wondered what was wrong with me," he later wrote. "I had broken my neck and become paralyzed, possibly forever, but still hadn't found God."

In his 2002 book Nothing Is Impossible: Reflections on a New Life, Reeve said that he and his wife had regularly attended Unitarian services, starting in his late 40s. In the years following the accident, he had gradually come to believe that:

Spirituality is found in the way we live our daily lives. It means spending time thinking about others. It's not so hard to imagine that there is some kind of higher power. We don't have to know what form it takes or exactly where it exists; just to honor it and try to live by it is enough. ... As these thoughts unfolded in the process of learning to live my new life, I had no idea that I was becoming a Unitarian.

== Activism ==
At age 15, Reeve developed a passionate interest in political and social causes. He conducted a door-to-door campaign on behalf of Robert F. Kennedy in 1968 and participated in protests against the invasion of Cambodia in 1970.

After the release of Superman, Reeve used his celebrity status to enable him to support several philanthropic causes. Through the Make-A-Wish Foundation, Reeve visited terminally ill children. He joined the board of directors for the worldwide charity Save the Children. In 1979, Reeve served as a track and field coach at the Special Olympics.

Reeve was critical of Ronald Reagan's presidency. In the 1980s, he campaigned for Vermont Senator Patrick Leahy and made speeches throughout the state. (Note: Reeve's daughter Alexandra served on the Senate Judiciary Committee under Leahy from 2011 to 2016. First as a Nominations Counsel, and then as Chief Counsel for IP and Antitrust.) In the 1988 Democratic Party presidential primaries, he endorsed Senator Paul Simon. Reeve served as a board member for the Charles Lindbergh Fund, which promotes environmentally safe technologies, and lent support to causes such as Amnesty International, the Natural Resources Defense Council, and People for the American Way. As a pilot with the Environmental Air Force he gave government officials and journalists aerial tours over areas of environmental damage. In 1983, Reeve was elected to Actors' Equity Association Council.

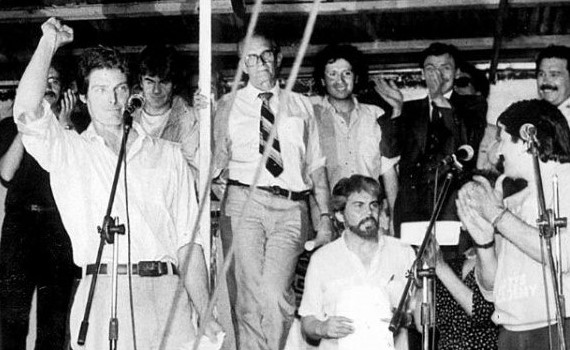
Reeve at Life and Art rally in Chile, November 1987

In late 1987, in Santiago, Chile, the country's dictator, Augusto Pinochet, threatened to execute 77 actors. Ariel Dorfman asked Reeve to help save their lives. Reeve flew to Chile and helped lead a protest march. A cartoon then ran in a newspaper showing him carrying Pinochet by the collar with the caption, "Where will you take him, Superman?" For his contribution to the protest, Reeve was awarded the Grand Cross of the Order of Bernardo O'Higgins, the highest Chilean distinction for foreigners. He also received an Obie Award and the Annual Walter Briehl Human Rights Foundation award. The following year, Reeve was among the international stars for the No campaign in the Chilean presidential referendum that marked the end of Pinochet's rule. (Note: The 2012 Chilean film No, which was nominated for Best Foreign Language Film at the 85th Academy Awards, features archive footage of Reeve from the campaign. In 2023, Variety reported that Pablo Larraín's (director of No) production company Fábula was developing the docudrama series about Reeve's trip to Chile.)

Reeve spoke out against Donald Trump's developing projects on West End Avenue in the late 1980s. The 1991 documentary Trump: What's the Deal?, which was suppressed for years, showed Reeve deliver a critical speech on the topic at a public event. The documentary also featured an interview in which Reeve called Trump's ambitions "the American dream gone berserk", adding, "You're allowed to dream as big as you want, but if your dreams step on the lives of ordinary people and ruin the quality of their life and their neighborhood, you have to be stopped."

In 1993, a teacher at Flowing Wells High School was fired for staging a play with homosexual themes during the school's arts week. In response, People for the American Way held a forum on the issue of censorship in Tucson, Arizona. Reeve and several other actors performed an impromptu reading of the play to a standing ovation. Representing the actors on the panel discussion, Reeve was heckled by some parents, to which he responded, "What I hear this lady saying is that she is uncomfortable with things that don't resemble her or her way of life. This country is founded on a completely different principle, which is tolerance and diversity." The dismissed teacher described the demonstration as "a healing experience".

In 1989, Reeve's friend Ron Silver started the Creative Coalition (TCC), a liberal organization aiming to teach celebrities how to speak knowledgeably about political issues. Reeve was an early member of the group, along with Susan Sarandon, Alec Baldwin, and Blythe Danner. The group's initiatives included environmental issues and defending the National Endowment of the Arts, which was under attack from conservative Republicans who objected to taxpayer funding of art they considered offensive. Reeve was elected as a co-president of TCC in 1994. They were instrumental in starting residential recycling in New York, convincing the state legislature to allocate $1 billion to protect the city's watershed area, and stopping the building of a coal-fired power station near Albany. The organization's work was noticed nationwide, and the Democratic Party asked Reeve to run for the United States Congress. He replied, "Run for Congress? And lose my influence in Washington?" In 1997, TCC established the Christopher Reeve First Amendment Award.

In 1996, 10 months after his injury, Reeve appeared at the 68th Academy Awards to a long standing ovation. He used the occasion to encourage Hollywood to make more films on social issues, saying, "Let's continue to take risks. Let's tackle the issues. In many ways our film community can do it better than anyone else."

=== Disability activism ===
Reeve left the Kessler Rehabilitation Center feeling inspiration from the other patients he had met. Because the media was constantly covering him, he decided to use his name to put focus on spinal cord injuries. He traveled across the country to make speeches and also hosted the 1996 Summer Paralympic Games in Atlanta and spoke at the Democratic National Convention. For these efforts, he was placed on the cover of Time on August 26, 1996.

Reeve was elected chairman of the American Paralysis Association and vice chairman of the National Organization on Disability. With Joan Irvine Smith, he co-founded the Reeve-Irvine Research Center, which is now one of the leading spinal cord research centers in the world. In 1999, the American Paralysis Association and Reeve's own foundation, established in 1996, were merged into the Christopher Reeve Foundation, which aims to speed up research through funding and to use grants to improve the quality of lives of people with disabilities. The Foundation to date has given more than $140 million to research and more than $46 million in quality-of-life grants. Reeve served as a board member for several organizations' aim to improve quality of life for people with disabilities.

In the mid-1990s, Reeve established the Christopher Reeve Acting Scholarship, which is given to a young disabled actor at the Media Access Awards, sponsored by the Reeve Foundation. The scholarship changed its name to the Christopher Reeve Acting Award in 2023.

Reeve's first effort to change disability legislation was in supporting a 1997 bill to raise the lifetime "cap" on insurance payments from $1 million to $10 million per person. For catastrophically injured people with one insurance policy, the $1 million limit often lasts just a few years. He said, "There are certain CEOs of insurance companies taking home $300 million a year in personal income. That is outrageous. We need to make insurance companies provide the benefits they are supposed to, and we shouldn't have to fight for necessities." The bill was narrowly defeated. In 1999, Reeve supported the Work Incentives Improvement Act, which allows people to continue to receive disability benefits after they return to work. This bill passed.

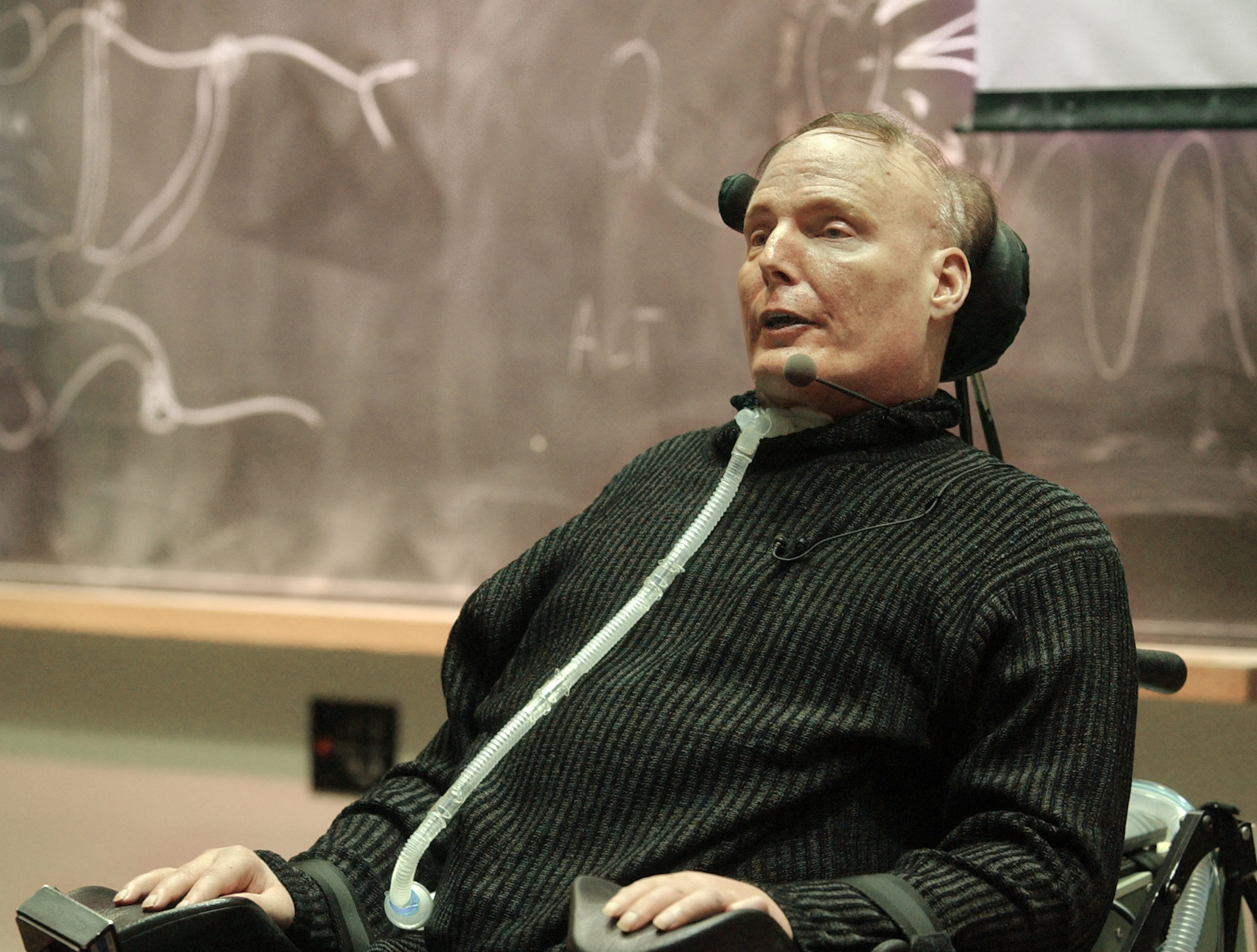
Reeve discussing stem cell research at a conference at MIT, March 2, 2003

Reeve lobbied for expanded federal funding on embryonic stem cell research to include all embryonic stem cell lines in existence and for self-governance to make open-ended scientific inquiry of the research. President George W. Bush limited federal funding to research only on human embryonic stem cell lines created on or before August 9, 2001, the day he announced his policy, and allotted approximately $100 million for it. Reeve initially called this "a step in the right direction", admitting that he did not know about the existing lines and would look into them further. He fought against the limit when scientists revealed an early research technique involved mixing the human stem cells with mouse cells contaminated most of the old lines.

In 2001, Reeve received Public Service Award from the American Society for Cell Biology for "outstanding public service in support of biomedical research." The following year, he lobbied for the Human Cloning Prohibition Act of 2001, which would allow somatic cell nuclear transfer research, but would ban reproductive cloning. Reeve argued stem cell implantation is unsafe unless the stem cells contain the patient's own DNA and because somatic cell nuclear transfer is done without fertilizing an egg, it can be fully regulated. In June 2004, Reeve provided a videotaped message on behalf of the Genetics Policy Institute to the delegates of the United Nations in defense of somatic cell nuclear transfer, which a world treaty was considering banning. In the final days of his life, Reeve urged California voters to vote yes on Proposition 71, which would establish the California Institute for Regenerative Medicine and would allot $3 billion of state funds to stem cell research. Proposition 71 was approved less than one month after Reeve's death.

In July 2003, Reeve's continuing frustration with the pace of stem cell research in the US led him to Israel, a country that was then, according to him, at the center of research in spinal cord injury. Israel's Ministry of Foreign Affairs invited him to seek out the best treatment for his condition. During his visit, Reeve called the experience "a privilege" and said, "Israel has very proactive rehab facilities, excellent medical schools and teaching hospitals, and an absolutely first-rate research infrastructure." Israelis were very receptive to Reeve's visit, calling him an inspiration to all and urging him never to give up hope.

In September 2003, Reeve was awarded the Lasker Public Service Award "for his perceptive, sustained and heroic advocacy for medical research in general and victims of disability in particular."

Commenting on Reeve's impact, Jerome Groopman said in 2003, "I think that people of prominence or great resources are the ones who act as catalysts in our society. ... There was essentially no substantial funding of spinal-cord research before Reeve's injury, and now it is one of the hottest areas in neurobiology. Scientists are flocking to work in it, because science follows the money." Of Reeve, UC Irvine said, "in the years following his injury, Christopher did more to promote research on spinal cord injury and other neurological disorders than any other person before or since."

== Health problems and death ==
During his teenage years, Reeve suffered from occasional bouts of asthma and allergies. He sustained injuries in various sports activities, such as a broken ankle while skiing and a fractured rib from a riding mishap while training for Anna Karenina. At Kessler Rehabilitation Center, Reeve discovered that he had not fully recovered from malaria, which he contracted while scouting filming locations in Kenya in 1993.

Reeve had a rare condition called mastocytosis, which made him vulnerable to anaphylaxis, and more than once he had a severe reaction to a drug. While at Kessler, he tried a drug which was theorized to help reduce damage to the spinal cord. The drug caused him to go into anaphylactic shock, and his heart stopped. He said he had an out-of-body experience and remembered saying, "I'm sorry, but I have to go now", during the event. In his autobiography, he wrote, "and then I left my body. I was up on the ceiling. ... I looked down and saw my body stretched out on the bed, not moving, while everybody—there were 15 or 20 people, the doctors, the EMTs, the nurses—was working on me. The noise and commotion grew quieter as though someone were gradually turning down the volume." After receiving a large dose of epinephrine, he woke up and stabilized later that night. Two days later, he gave it another try, but experienced the same anaphylactic reaction and was immediately given epinephrine.

At age 16, Reeve developed alopecia areata. Generally, he was able to comb over the bald spots resulting from the condition, which abated for long periods. However, it became more noticeable after he was paralyzed. He was given a medication for it, but an adverse reaction caused all the hair on his body to fall out, including his eyebrows and eyelashes.

During 1996 and 1997, Reeve was frequently hospitalized for dysreflexia, pneumonia, a collapsed lung, and two blood clots. On one occasion, he was put incorrectly in a wheelchair, which caused him to fall and break his left arm. A titanium rod was inserted inside his humerus bone to stabilize his arm. In 1997, a small ulcer on his left ankle became infected, eventually spreading to the bone. He was warned that his leg might have to be amputated to prevent further spread of infection. Reeve sought help from specialists at Albany Medical Center, who examined his leg, removing the dead tissue and putting him on powerful antibiotics, although he developed an allergy after eight days. His leg fully healed a few months later.

By early October 2004, Reeve was being treated for an infected pressure ulcer that was causing sepsis, a complication he had experienced many times before. On October 4, Reeve spoke at the Rehabilitation Institute of Chicago on behalf of its work; it was his last reported public appearance. On October 9, Reeve attended his son Will's hockey game. That night, he went into cardiac arrest after receiving an antibiotic for the infection. He fell into a coma, and was taken to Northern Westchester Hospital in Mount Kisco, New York. Eighteen hours later, on October 10, Reeve died at age 52. No autopsy was performed. However, both Reeve's wife, Dana, and his doctor, John McDonald, believed that an adverse reaction to a drug caused his death.

Reeve's remains were cremated at Ferncliff Cemetery, where his ashes were sprinkled in the wind by his family. A memorial service for Reeve was held at the Unitarian Church in Westport, Connecticut, which was officiated by Frank Hall. Another private memorial service held at the Juilliard School three weeks later was attended by more than 900 people, with speakers.

== Legacy ==
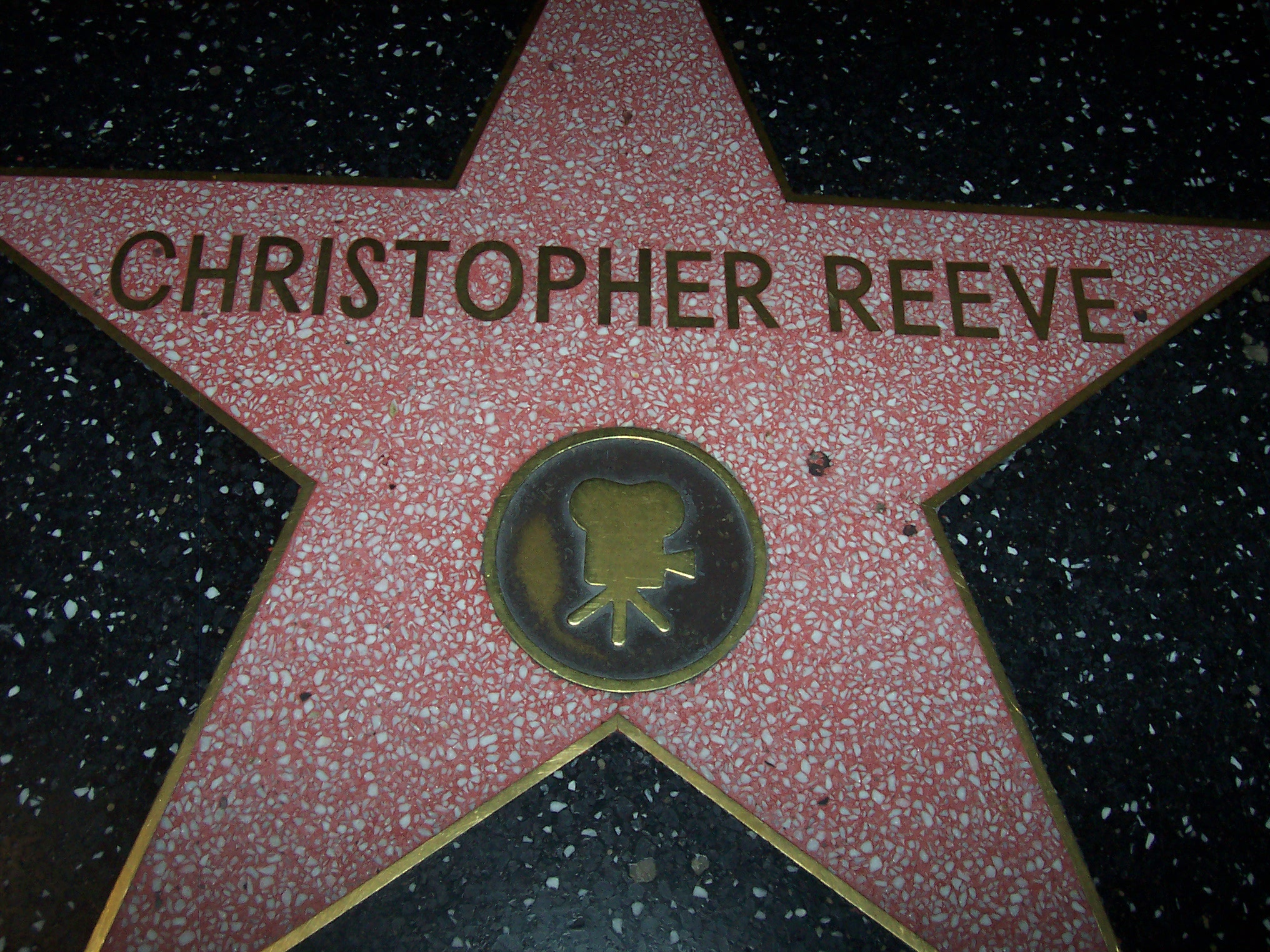
Reeve's star on the Hollywood Walk of Fame in 2010

Reeve's widow Dana continued to head the Christopher Reeve Foundation until her death in 2006, and the foundation was subsequently renamed the Christopher & Dana Reeve Foundation. Reeve's children serve on the board of directors of the foundation.

Following Reeve's death, the Society for Neuroscience added his name to their satellite symposium dedicated to stem cell research. The Annual Christopher Reeve "Hot Topics" in Stem Cell Biology is held almost annually, except for 2020, 2021, and 2024.

In 2005, Princeton Day School established the Christopher Reeve '70 Sportsmanship Award that is awarded during the Invitational Ice Hockey Tournament. In 2006, Cornell University dedicated a plaque to Reeve at the Schwartz Center for the Performing Arts and established the Christopher Reeve '74 Scholarship that provides support to students majoring in theater, film, music, and English.

In 2005, the Williamstown Theatre Festival, where Reeve often performed during his career, announced that it would dedicate the final performance of every season to his memory and would establish a fund to support artists with disabilities. In 2015, Princeton Public Library created the Christopher Reeve Theater and Dramatic Arts Collection that consists of books on acting, screenwriting, theater, filmmaking, cinema studies, music and Broadway. Reeve's books are also part of the collection.

From 2004 to 2016, Heart of America Foundation presented the Christopher Reeve Award, an annual scholarship funded by Merriam-Webster, Inc., to "a student who has demonstrated outstanding compassion and caring by serving their community." In 2018, Drexel University College of Medicine established the Christopher Reeve Endowment Award "as a scholarship fund for support of research and training of scientists and clinicians working in the area of spinal cord and brain injury research."

In March 2009, President Barack Obama signed the Christopher and Dana Reeve Paralysis Act that aims "to enhance and further research into paralysis and to improve rehabilitation and the quality of life for persons living with paralysis and other physical disabilities."

Alexander Newley's portrait of Reeve is in the collection of the National Portrait Gallery.

On September 25, 2021, Google celebrated Reeve's 69th birthday with a Google Doodle.

A documentary about Reeve's life and the aftermath of his accident titled Super/Man: The Christopher Reeve Story premiered at the Sundance Film Festival on January 19, 2024. On the 20th anniversary of Reeve's death, the Empire State Building was lit in blue, yellow, red, and orange colors in honor of the foundation's work and the wide release of the documentary. On October 25, 2024, a French documentary about Reeve titled Christopher Reeve: The Eternal Superman was released on TCM Cinéma.

== Awards and nominations ==
| Award | Year | Category | Nominated work | Result | Ref. |
|---|---|---|---|---|---|
| Audie Awards | 1999 | Inspirational | Still Me | Won | |
| Audie Awards | 1999 | Solo Narration by the Author | Still Me | Won | |
| AudioFile Earphones Award | 1998 | —N/a | Still Me | Won | |
| British Academy Film Award | 1978 | Most Promising Newcomer to Leading Film Roles | Superman | Won | |
| CableACE Award | 1997 | Directing a Dramatic Special or Series | In the Gloaming | Nominated | |
| Directors Guild of America Awards | 2004 | Outstanding Directorial Achievement in Miniseries or Movies for Television | The Brooke Ellison Story | Nominated | |
| Emmy Awards | 1997 | Outstanding Directing for a Miniseries or Special | In the Gloaming | Nominated | |
| Emmy Awards | 1997 | Outstanding Informational Special | Without Pity: A Film About Abilities | Won | |
| Emmy Awards | 1998 | Outstanding Variety, Music or Comedy Special | Christopher Reeve: A Celebration of Hope | Nominated | |
| Emmy Awards | 2003 | Outstanding Nonfiction Special | Christopher Reeve: Courageous Steps | Nominated | |
| Fantafestival | 1981 | Best Actor | Somewhere in Time | Won | |
| Golden Globe Awards | 1998 | Best Actor – Miniseries or Motion Picture Made for Television | Rear Window | Nominated | |
| Grammy Awards | 1998 | Best Spoken Word Album | Still Me | Won | |
| Grammy Awards | 2002 | Best Spoken Word Album | Nothing Is Impossible | Nominated | |
| Jupiter Award | 1979 | Best International Actor | Superman | Nominated | |
| Online Film and Television Association | 1997 | Best Direction of a Motion Picture or Miniseries | In the Gloaming | Won | |
| Saturn Awards | 1978 | Best Actor | Superman | Nominated | |
| Saturn Awards | 1980 | Best Actor | Somewhere in Time | Nominated | |
| Saturn Awards | 1981 | Best Actor | Superman II | Nominated | |
| Saturn Awards | 1982 | Best Actor | Deathtrap | Nominated | |
| Saturn Awards | 1983 | Best Actor | Superman III | Nominated | |
| Screen Actors Guild Awards | 1998 | Outstanding Performance by a Male Actor in a Miniseries or Television Movie | Rear Window | Won | |

=== Honorary awards ===
| Organizations | Year | Award | Result | Ref. |
|---|---|---|---|---|
| Obie Awards | 1988 | Special Citation | Honored | |
| Walter Briehl Human Rights Foundation | 1988 | —N/a | Honored | |
| Princeton Day School | 1990 | The Alumni Award | Honored | |
| Courage Center | 1996 | National Courage Award | Honored | |
| Paralysed Veterans of America | 1996 | Promise of Progress | Honored | |
| Young Artist Award | 1996 | The Jackie Coogan Award | Honored | |
| Hollywood Walk of Fame | 1997 | Motion Picture Star | Honored | |
| Helen Hayes Hospital Foundation | 1997 | Helen Hayes MacArthur Award | Honored | |
| GQ Men of the Year | 1997 | Man of Courage | Honored | |
| Society for Neuroscience | 2000 | Special Achievement | Honored | |
| Heart of America Foundation | 2000 | Heroes of the Heart | Honored | |
| National Italian American Foundation | 2001 | One America | Honored | |
| American Society for Cell Biology | 2001 | Public Service Award | Honored | |
| Lasker Award | 2003 | Public Service Award | Honored | |
| World Awards | 2003 | Lifetime Achievement Award | Honored | |
| Order of Bernardo O'Higgins | 2004 | Grand Cross | Honored | |
| PNC Financial Services | 2004 | Common Wealth Awards of Distinguished Service | Honored | |
| Jules Verne Awards | 2004 | Jules Verne Achievement Award | Honored | |
| CNN Heroes: An All-Star Tribute | 2007 | Heroes' Hero | Honored | |
| New Jersey Hall of Fame | 2012 | Inductee | Honored | |

=== Honorary degrees ===
| Organizations | Year | Award | Result | Ref. |
|---|---|---|---|---|
| Juilliard School | 1997 | Honorary Doctor of Fine Arts | Honored | |
| Boston University School of Medicine | 1997 | Honorary Doctor of Laws | Honored | |
| Pace University | 1998 | Honorary Doctor of Humane Letters | Honored | |
| Williams College | 1999 | Honorary Doctor of Humane Letters | Honored | |
| Drew University | 1999 | Honorary degree | Honored | |
| Middlebury College | 2004 | Honorary Doctor of Humane Letters | Honored | |
| Stony Brook University | 2005 | Honorary Doctor of Humane Letters | Honored | |
| Rutgers University | 2005 | Honorary Doctor of Humane Letters | Honored | |

== See also ==
- Superman curse – Urban myth

== Bibliography ==
- Reeve, Christopher (1998). Still Me. Random House. ISBN 0-679-45235-4.
- Reeve, Christopher (2002). Nothing Is Impossible. Random House. ISBN 0-375-50778-7.
