= What's the Deal =

What's the Deal may refer to:

- Trump: What's the Deal?, American documentary film screened in 1999 and released in 2015
- "What's the Deal?" (Beavis and Butt-head), episode of reality television series Beavis and Butt-Head
