= Without Pity =

Without Pity may refer to:

- Without Pity (1948 film), an Italian film
- Without Pity (2014 film), an Italian crime-thriller film
- Without Pity: A Film About Abilities, a 1996 American television documentary film
