= ASCB Public Service Award =

ASCB award

The American Society for Cell Biology's highest honor for Public Service, the ASCB Public Service Award is for outstanding national leadership in support of biomedical research. The awardees are selected by the ASCB Public Policy Committee.

== Awardees ==
Source: ASCB

- 2022 George Langford
- 2021 Raynard Kington and Donna Ginther
- 2020 Anthony Fauci
- 2019 James F. Deatherage
- 2018 Senator Roy Blunt (R-Mo) and Representative Tom Cole (R-OK)
- 2016 Senator Richard Durbin
- 2014 Rush Holt Jr.
- 2013 Jeremy Berg
- 2012 Keith Yamamoto
- 2010 Tom Pollard
- 2009 Larry Goldstein
- 2008 Maxine Singer
- 2007 Representative Michael N. Castle (R-DE)
- 2006 Barbara Forrest and Ken Miller
- 2005 Senator Arlen Specter (R-PA)
- 2004 Elizabeth Blackburn
- 2003 Paul Berg
- 2002 Matthew Meselson
- 2001 Christopher Reeve
- 2000 Donna Shalala, US Health & Human Services Secretary
- 1999 Harold Varmus
- 1998 J. Michael Bishop
- 1997 Representative George Gekas (R-PA)
- 1996 Marc Kirschner
- 1995 Representative John Porter (R-IL)
- 1994 Senator Tom Harkin (D-IA)

== See also ==
- List of biomedical science awards
