= Swan 40 Frers =

Sailboat class

Development
- Designer: Germán Frers
- Location: Finland
- Year: 1992
- No. built: 58
- Builder: Oy Nautor AB
- Role: Cruiser-Racer

Boat
- Displacement: 19,400 lb (8,800 kg)
- Draft: 7.04 ft (2.15 m)

Hull
- Type: monohull
- Construction: glassfibre
- LOA: 40.25 ft (12.27 m)
- LWL: 32.43 ft (9.88 m)
- Beam: 12.92 ft (3.94 m)
- Engine: Volvo Penta diesel engine

Hull appendages
- Keel: fin keel with weighted bulb
- Ballast: 6,990 lb (3,171 kg)
- Rudder: Spade-type rudder

Rig
- Rig type: Bermuda rig
- I foretriangle height: 54.79 ft (16.70 m)
- J foretriangle base: 15.91 ft (4.85 m)
- P mainsail luff: 47.57 ft (14.50 m)
- E mainsail foot: 16.57 ft (5.05 m)

Sails
- Sailplan: Masthead sloop
- Mainsail area: 394.12 sq ft (36.615 m^{2})
- Jib/genoa area: 435.85 sq ft (40.492 m^{2})
- Total sail area: 829.97 sq ft (77.107 m^{2})

Rating
- PHRF: 72-93

The Swan 40 Frers, also referred to as the Swan 40-2, is a Finnish sailboat that was designed by Germán Frers as a cruiser-racer and first built in 1992.

The design was originally marketed by the manufacturer as the Swan 40, but is now usually referred to as the Swan 40 Frers or the Swan 40-2, to differentiate it from the unrelated 1970 Sparkman & Stephens Swan 40 design.

== Production ==
The design was built by Oy Nautor AB in Finland, from 1992 until 2001, with 58 boats completed, but it is now out of production.

== Design ==
The Swan 40 Frers is a recreational keelboat, built predominantly of glassfibre, with wood trim. It has a masthead sloop rig, with three sets of unswept spreaders and aluminium spars. The hull has a raked stem, a reverse transom, an internally mounted spade-type rudder controlled by a wheel and a fixed fin keel or optional stub keel and retractable centreboard. It displaces 19,400 lb (8,800 kg) and carries 6,990 lb (3,171 kg) of lead ballast.

The keel-equipped version of the boat has a draft of 7.04 ft (2.15 m), while the centerboard-equipped version has a draft of 9.51 ft (2.90 m) with the centerboard extended and 5.25 ft (1.60 m) with it retracted, allowing operation in shallow water.

The boat is fitted with a Swedish Volvo Penta diesel engine for docking and manoeuvring. The fuel tank holds 62 U.S. gallons (230 L; 52 imp gal) and the fresh water tank has a capacity of 112 U.S. gallons (420 L; 93 imp gal).

The design has sleeping accommodation for five people, with a double "V"-berth in the bow cabin, two straight settees and a pilot berth in the main cabin and an aft cabin with a double berth. The galley is located on the port side just aft of the companionway ladder. The galley is equipped with a three-burner stove, an ice box and a double sink. A navigation station is opposite the galley, on the starboard side. There are two heads, one just aft of the bow cabin on the port side and one on the starboard side in the aft cabin.

The design has a hull speed of 7.63 kn (14.13 km/h) and a PHRF handicap of 72 to 93 for the fixed keel version and 87 to 96 for the centreboard version.

== Operational history ==
In a 2000 review, Robert Perry wrote, "the Swan 40 designed by German Frers, may be an interesting comparison boat for those of you compiling knot-per-dollar ratios. To most of us, Swans have come to represent the best of the breed. 'Swan quality' is an industry accepted specification ... design specifics aside, perhaps nobody draws as beautiful a hull shape as Frers does. He has the knack to maintain a classic set of proportions regardless of the basic parameters."

== See also ==
- List of sailing boat types
