= Still Me =

Autobiography by Christopher Reeve

First edition cover

Still Me is a 1998 autobiography by American actor Christopher Reeve. The book tells of Reeve's experiences of making the Superman films and about his horseback riding accident which resulted in his quadriplegia and its effects on his life. The book spent 11 weeks on the New York Times Best Seller list in 1998. Reeve won a Grammy Award for Best Spoken Word Album.
