= Anna Karenina (1985 film) =

1985 film by Simon Langton

- Genre: Drama; Romance
- Based on: Anna Karenina by Leo Tolstoy
- Written by: James Goldman
- Directed by: Simon Langton
- Starring: Jacqueline Bisset; Christopher Reeve; Paul Scofield; Ian Ogilvy
- Music by: Patrick Gowers
- Country of origin: United States
- Original language: English

Production
- Executive producer: Doreen Bergesen
- Producer: Simon Langton
- Production location: Hungary
- Cinematography: Kelvin Pike
- Editor: Barry Peters
- Running time: 150 minutes
- Production companies: Colgems Productions; Rastar Productions
- Budget: $5 million

Original release
- Network: CBS
- Release: March 26, 1985

Anna Karenina is a 1985 American made-for-television romantic drama film based on the famous Leo Tolstoy 1877 novel Anna Karenina starring Jacqueline Bisset and Christopher Reeve and directed by Simon Langton. The film was broadcast on CBS on March 26, 1985.

== Plot ==
The beautiful aristocrat Anna Karenina (Russian: «Анна Каренина»; Russian pronunciation: [ˈanːə kɐˈrʲenʲɪnə]) betrays her cold husband by having an affair with the dashing cavalryman Count Aleksei Vronsky in 19th-century Russia. Her decision has terrible consequences for Anna and those she loves, with a tragic ending.

== Cast ==
- Jacqueline Bisset as Anna Karenina
- Christopher Reeve as Count Aleksei Vronsky
- Paul Scofield as Aleksei Karenin
- Ian Ogilvy as Stiva
- Anna Massey as Betsy
- Joanna David as Dolly
- Judi Bowker as Kitty
- Valerie Lush as Annushka
- Judy Campbell as Countess Vronsky
- Paul Geoffrey as Petritsky

== Production notes ==
Reeve, who learned horsemanship for his role as Vronsky, developed an interest in horses and equestrian sports. In 1995, he was paralyzed from the neck down after being thrown during a ride.
