= The Aviator (1985 film) =

1985 film

- Theatrical release poster
- Directed by: George T. Miller
- Screenplay by: Marc Norman
- Based on: The Aviator; 1981 novel by Ernest K. Gann
- Produced by: Mace Neufeld; Thomas H. Brodek
- Starring: Christopher Reeve; Rosanna Arquette; Jack Warden; Tyne Daly
- Cinematography: David Connell
- Edited by: Duane Hartzell
- Music by: Dominic Frontiere
- Production companies: United Artists; Mace Neufeld Productions
- Distributed by: MGM/UA Entertainment Co.
- Release date: March 1, 1985
- Running time: 98 minutes
- Country: United States
- Language: English
- Box office: $1,304,192

The Aviator is a 1985 American aviation adventure drama film directed by George T. Miller and starring Christopher Reeve and Rosanna Arquette.

== Plot ==
Edgar Anscombe is an instructor at a US Army Air Corps flying school in 1918. While he is teaching a young pilot, the aircraft crashes during a landing attempt and bursts into flames. The student is killed, though Edgar survives.

Ten years later, Edgar is a Contract Air Mail pilot flying the rugged CAM-5 route between Elko, Nevada and Pasco, Washington. When asked to take a passenger, Edgar reluctantly agrees, revealing that the last time he had a passenger in his aircraft, it was the doomed trainee.

Tillie Hansen is outspoken and rebellious. She makes it clear that she does not want to go to her aunt's house, but her father demands it. He uses his influence as banker for the airline to secure passage for her. Tillie annoys Edgar with her questions, and he acts coldly towards her.

During the stopover at Boise, Idaho, Edgar's pilot friend, Jerry, changes the oil lines on the engine, but neglects to inspect his work after a call comes in for him. The tension between Edgar and Tillie continues to escalate, and when the flight resumes, Edgar decides to take a shortcut over the mountains, deviating from the normal route. However, the engine loses oil pressure and soon fails, causing Edgar to crash land on a remote ridge.

Tillie blames Edgar for stranding them, and Edgar calls Tillie a jinx. During the night, Tillie accidentally blows up the remains of the aircraft with a cigarette. Afterward, Edgar's anger subsides as he seems to accept the hopelessness of their situation.

The next day, Edgar goes out hunting and manages to shoot a rabbit with his pistol. However, while returning to camp he is attacked by a pack of wolves who steal the rabbit and badly injure his arm. Tillie manages to sew the wound shut and bandages his arm. Faced with the continued threat of the wolves, and since the remains of the aircraft have been destroyed, Edgar and Tillie decide to climb down the cliff to the canyon below.

During their descent, a search aircraft flies overhead. Edgar and Tillie jump on a ledge to try to signal the aircraft, but Tillie falls and breaks her leg. The two are forced to spend the night on the cliff face, and a mutual affection develops. The next day, Edgar carries Tillie to the canyon floor, where he makes a travois to haul her.

When Tillie spots some telephone lines, Edgar heads off to investigate, leaving Tillie his revolver. Meanwhile, one of the search pilots has determined the location of the crash, and flies toward the crash site. As Edgar returns to the clearing where he has left Tillie, he is again attacked by a wolf, within sight of Tillie. The rescuers fly overhead and spot Edgar, but are powerless to help. Tillie manages to crawl out of her travois and shoots the wolf, saving Edgar's life. They are rescued, with hints of a romantic relationship developing.

== Cast ==
- Christopher Reeve as Edgar Anscombe
- Rosanna Arquette as Tillie Hansen
- Jack Warden as Moravia
- Sam Wanamaker as Bruno Hansen
- Scott Wilson as Jerry Stiller
- Tyne Daly as Evelyn Stiller
- Marcia Strassman as Rose Stiller
- Will Hare as Old Man
- Robert Pierce as Student Pilot
- Glenn Neufeld as George Hansen
- Frano Lasić as Daniel Hansen
- Ron Travis as Probosky
- Jeff Harding as Carson
- Paul Reid Roman as Counterman
- Paul Lichtman as Customer

== Production ==
The story of the film was adapted by Marc Norman from the book The Aviator, written by Ernest K. Gann. In the book, Tillie is an 11-year-old girl rather than the pert teenager in the film. Also she is critically injured after the crash of the Stearman mailplane and is immobile the entire time afterward.

Although set in the northwestern United States, the film was actually shot in Croatia near Rijeka, and Ljubljana, Slovenia, then a part of Yugoslavia.

== Reception ==
Aviation film historian Stephen Pendo noted that aviation films such as The Aviator had a difficult time. The last major feature, Blaze of Noon (1947), also adapted from a Gann novel, that explored the air mail period was mildly successful. "While many aspects of aviation have continued to interest filmmakers years after the events have passed, the glamor of flying the mail faded quickly ..." and so did interest in this film, concluded Pendo. Film critic Leonard Maltin's review was succinct, "Dull Ernest Gann story barely made it (and understandably so) to theaters." Famed Chicago critics Gene Siskel and Roger Ebert slammed the film, and when they brought it on their TV show At the Movies, they included the film as a "stinker" of the week- a rare title reserved for only films they considered awful. Ebert saying that "the film takes all the basic cliches from 2 totally different genres and combine them to make one remarkably and almost transcendentally silly movie- it doesn't contain a single ounce of thought" and Siskel noting that "there isn't a single scene in this movie that is good. Not one. It is uniformly awful and boring."

On Rotten Tomatoes the film has an approval rating of 20% based on reviews from 5 critics.

== See also ==
- Airmails of the United States, which describes the Contract Air Mail service and specifically the CAM-5 route which provides the setting for the film
