= Swan 40 =

Sailboat class

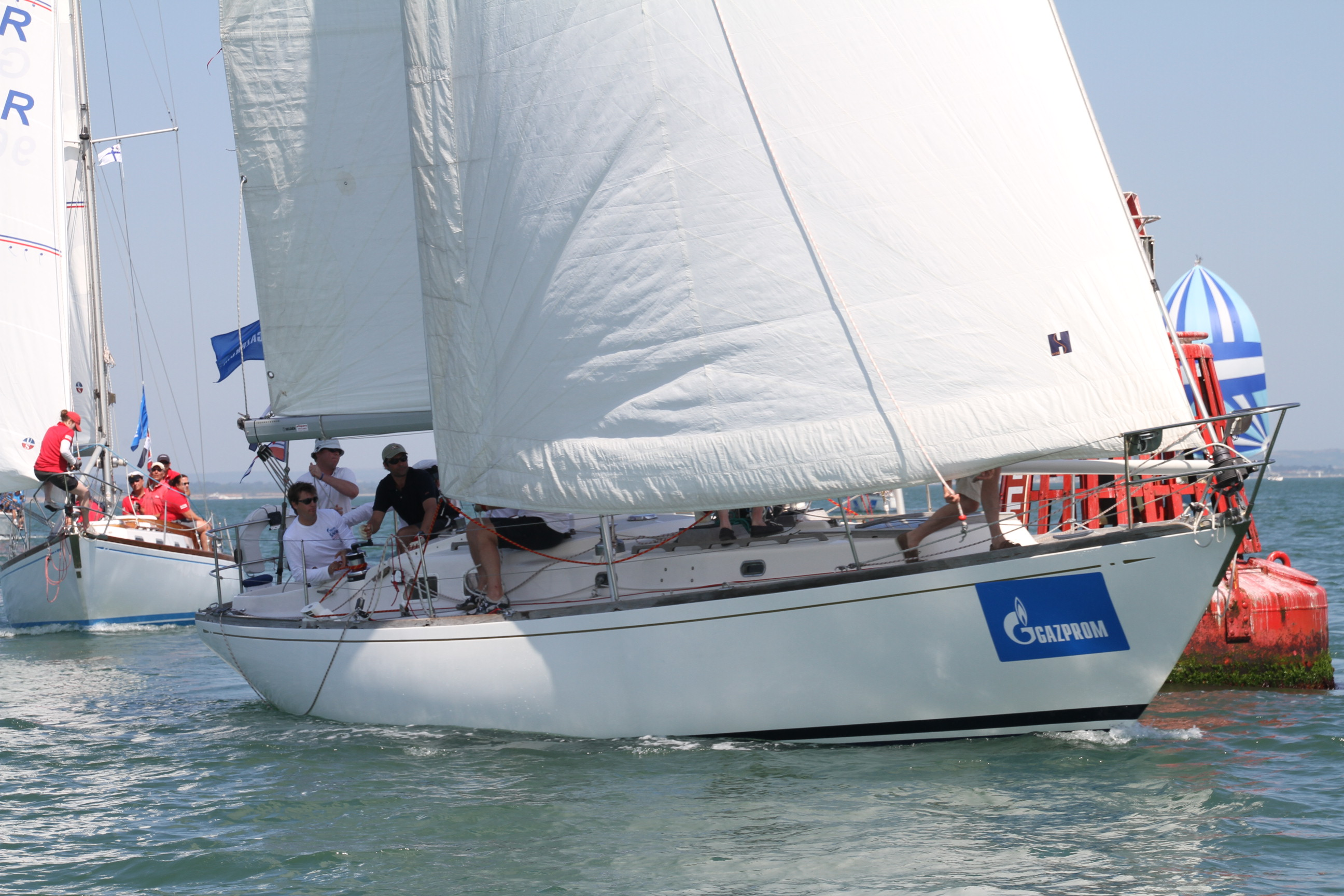

Development
- Designer: Sparkman & Stephens
- Location: Finland
- Year: 1970
- No. built: 51
- Builder: Oy Nautor AB
- Role: Cruiser
- Name: Swan 40

Boat
- Displacement: 19,000 lb (8,618 kg)
- Draft: 6.70 ft (2.04 m)

Hull
- Type: monohull
- Construction: glassfibre
- LOA: 39.30 ft (11.98 m)
- LWL: 28.54 ft (8.70 m)
- Beam: 10.83 ft (3.30 m)
- Engine: Volvo Penta MD2B 25 hp (19 kW) diesel engine

Hull appendages
- Keel: fin keel
- Ballast: 7,900 lb (3,583 kg)
- Rudder: skeg-mounted rudder

Rig
- Rig type: Bermuda rig
- I foretriangle height: 49.04 ft (14.95 m)
- J foretriangle base: 15.84 ft (4.83 m)
- P mainsail luff: 44.04 ft (13.42 m)
- E mainsail foot: 14.54 ft (4.43 m)

Sails
- Sailplan: masthead sloop
- Mainsail area: 320.17 sq ft (29.745 m^{2})
- Jib/genoa area: 388.40 sq ft (36.084 m^{2})
- Total sail area: 708.57 sq ft (65.828 m^{2})

Racing
- PHRF: 120-129

The Swan 40 is a Finnish sailboat that was designed by Sparkman & Stephens as a cruiser and first built in 1970. The boat is Sparkman & Stephens' design 2025.

The boat is often referred to as the Swan 40 (S&S) to differentiate it from the 1992 Swan 40 designed by Germán Frers. It was also sold in the United States as the Palmer Johnson 40.

== Production ==
The design was built by Oy Nautor AB in Finland, from 1970 to 1972 with 51 boats built, but it is now out of production.

== Design ==
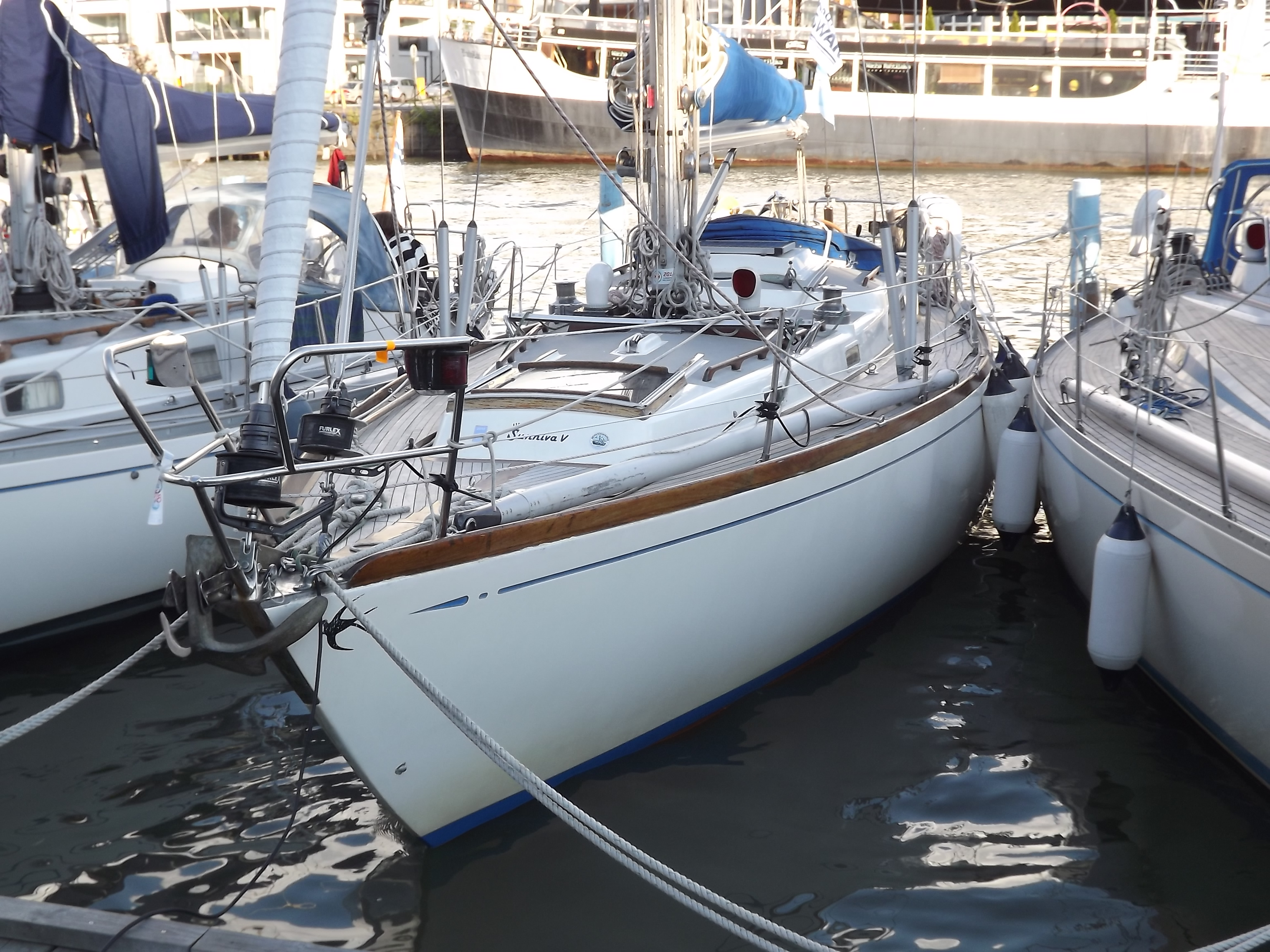
Swan 40

The Swan 40 is a recreational keelboat, built predominantly of glassfibre, with wood trim. It has a masthead sloop rig; a raked stem; a raised counter, reverse transom, a skeg-mounted rudder controlled by a wheel and a fixed fin keel or optional retractable centreboard. It displaces 19,000 lb (8,618 kg) and carries 7,900 lb (3,583 kg) of lead ballast. A tall mast was available as an option.

The boat has a draft of 6.70 ft (2.04 m) with the standard fin keel.

The boat is fitted with a Swedish Volvo Penta MD2B diesel engine of 25 hp (19 kW) for docking and manoeuvring. The fuel tank holds 40 U.S. gallons (150 L; 33 imp gal) and the fresh water tank has a capacity of 48 U.S. gallons (180 L; 40 imp gal).

The design has sleeping accommodation for six people, with a double "V"-berth in the bow cabin, two straight settee berths in the main cabin and an aft cabin with two single berths. The galley is located on the starboard side just forward of the companionway ladder. The galley is L-shaped and is equipped with a three-burner stove, an ice box and a double sink. A navigation station is opposite the galley, on the port side. The head is located just aft of the bow cabin on the port side.

The design has a hull speed of 7.16 kn (13.26 km/h) and a PHRF handicap of 120 to 129.

== See also ==
- List of sailing boat types
