= Donna Ginther =

Professor of Economics

- Education: University of Wisconsin, Madison
- Spouse: Rodger Erickson
- Children: 2
- Awards: University Scholar Award, 2012, University of Kansas Byron T. Shutz Award for Excellence in Teaching, 2012, University of Kansas; Leading Light Award, 2012, University of Kansas; Public Service Award, 2021, American Society for Cell Biology; Carolyn Shaw Bell Award, 2025, American Economic Association Carolyn Shaw Bell Award, 2025, American Economic Association
- Scientific career
- Fields: Economics
- Workplaces: University of Kansas; Federal Reserve Bank of Atlanta; Washington University; Southern Methodist University
- Doctoral advisors: Charles Manski
- Website: https://ipsr.ku.edu/dginther/

Donna Ginther is a Roy A. Roberts and Regents Distinguished Professor of economics and the director of the Institute for Policy and Social Research at the University of Kansas. She is also a research associate at the National Bureau of Economic Research. She is known for her expertise on scientific labor markets, wage inequality, and gender differences in employment outcomes.

== Biography ==
Ginther earned a Bachelor of Arts in 1987, Master of Arts in 1991, and a doctorate in economics in 1995, all from the University of Wisconsin, Madison. She taught at Southern Methodist University, Washington University in St. Louis, and has been a research economist at the Federal Reserve Bank of Atlanta.

== Research ==
Professor Ginther's research focuses on scientific labor markets, gender differences in employment, particularly in academia, and outcomes for children. It has been covered by the popular media, including Science, the New York Times, the Economist, and National Public Radio. She has testified before the U.S. Congress on multiple occasions.

=== Selected works ===
- Ceci, Stephen J., Donna K. Ginther, Shulamit Kahn, and Wendy M. Williams. "Women in academic science: A changing landscape." Psychological Science in the Public Interest 15, no. 3 (2014): 75–141.
- Ginther, Donna K., and Robert A. Pollak. "Family structure and children’s educational outcomes: Blended families, stylized facts, and descriptive regressions." Demography 41, no. 4 (2004): 671–696.
- Ginther, Donna K., and Shulamit Kahn. "Women in economics: moving up or falling off the academic career ladder?." Journal of Economic perspectives 18, no. 3 (2004): 193–214.
- Ginther, Donna, Robert Haveman, and Barbara Wolfe. "Neighborhood attributes as determinants of children's outcomes: how robust are the relationships?." Journal of Human Resources (2000): 603–642.
- Ginther, Donna K., Walter T. Schaffer, Joshua Schnell, Beth Masimore, Faye Liu, Laurel L. Haak, and Raynard Kington. "Race, ethnicity, and NIH research awards." Science 333, no. 6045 (2011): 1015–1019.
- Blau, Francine D., Janet M. Currie, Rachel TA Croson, and Donna K. Ginther. "Can mentoring help female assistant professors? Interim results from a randomized trial." American Economic Review 100, no. 2 (2010): 348–52.
