= Without Pity: A Film About Abilities =

- Written by: Michael Mierendorf
- Directed by: Michael Mierendorf
- Narrated by: Christopher Reeve
- Country of origin: United States

Production
- Executive producer: Sheila Nevins
- Producer: Michael Mierendorf
- Running time: 55 minutes
- Production company: Michael Mierendorf Productions

Original release
- Network: HBO
- Release: October 8, 1996

Without Pity: A Film About Abilities is a 1996 American television documentary film narrated by Christopher Reeve. This documentary celebrates the efforts of those with disabilities to live full, productive lives. It originally premiered on HBO on October 8, 1996.

== Summary ==
The viewers meet a cross section of Americans in the film. A young woman with cerebral palsy who cares for her baby, while a man with cerebral palsy lives successfully on his own after 40 years in a Colorado institution. The film takes a trip to school with a remarkable 6-year-old boy without arms or legs, visits the workplace of a blind computer expert, and meets a professor with polio who teaches the history of discrimination against people with disabilities. A young man recently made paraplegic discusses his daily battle with depression and his determination and motivation to overcome it and get on with his life.

This film applauds the resilience and potential of people with disabilities and their need to be determined to be self-sufficient.
