= Trump: What's the Deal? =

American documentary film screened in 1991 and released in 2015

- Written by: Jesse Kornbluth
- Produced by: Al Levin; Libby Handros
- Production company: The Deadline Company
- Release dates: July 5, 1991 (screening); 2015 (online release)
- Running time: 80 minutes
- Country: United States
- Language: English
- Budget: US$ 600,000

Trump: What's the Deal? is an American documentary film about Donald Trump's business projects, finances, and relationships. The documentary film was made for television, but was never broadcast. It was screened in 1991 and released online in 2015.

== History ==
In 1988, work on the documentary film started. It was intended as the first part of a television series about rich and famous Americans.

In 1989, the producers were unable to find a TV station that would broadcast the documentary film after syndicator LBS Communications pulled out. Executive producer Ned Schnurman claimed this happened under pressure of Trump, which both Trump and Henry Siegel of LBS denied.

On July 5, 1991, Trump: What's the Deal? was screened twice in the Bridgehampton Community House in Bridgehampton, New York.

In 2015, after Donald Trump announced he would run for President of the United States, TV stations would still not broadcast the documentary. The 80-minute documentary film was then released online with the tagline "The new Trump. The old Trump. The same Trump."

== Content ==
The documentary contains interviews and describes aspects of Trump's business projects, finances, and relationships.

David Cay Johnston wrote in The National Memo that "the documentary shows Trump manipulating politicians and the criminal justice system, pocketing millions in taxpayer welfare, not paying people he hired, doing some of his biggest deals with mobsters, retaining a cocaine dealer as his helicopter pilot, and evidently benefiting from having his sister working in the Justice Department before winning appointment as a federal judge."

In The Guardian, Charlie Lyne describes the film as "a flagrant hit piece documenting Trump's mafia connections and myriad legal troubles" with "uncomplicated aesthetic ambitions".

== Production ==
Ned Schnurman was the executive producer, Al Levin and Libby Handros were the associate producers, and Jesse Kornbluth was the script writer.

Leonard Stern, a business rival of Donald Trump, provided financing. According to Schnurman, Stern had promised not to interfere with the film making process. The costs were initially estimated at $350,000, but the film eventually cost $600,000.
