= Super/Man: The Christopher Reeve Story =

2024 documentary film

- Theatrical release poster
- Directed by: Ian Bonhôte; Peter Ettedgui
- Written by: Ian Bonhôte; Peter Ettedgui; Otto Burnham
- Produced by: Robert Ford; Lizzie Gillett; Ian Bonhôte
- Starring: Christopher Reeve; Dana Reeve; Alexandra Reeve Givens; Matthew Reeve; Will Reeve
- Cinematography: Brett Wiley
- Edited by: Otto Burnham
- Music by: Ilan Eshkeri
- Production companies: Words + Pictures; Misfits Entertainment; Passion Pictures; Jenco Films
- Distributed by: Warner Bros. Pictures (Note: Also distributed through Warner Bros.'s DC Studios, HBO Documentary Films, and CNN Films units); Fathom Events
- Release dates: January 19, 2024 (Sundance); September 21, 2024 (U.S.); November 1, 2024 (U.K.)
- Running time: 104 minutes
- Countries: United Kingdom; United States
- Language: English

Super/Man: The Christopher Reeve Story is a 2024 documentary film about the life of American actor Christopher Reeve after a horse riding accident left him paralyzed, and his subsequent work as an activist for disability rights. The documentary was directed by Ian Bonhôte and Peter Ettedgui, who co-wrote the script with Otto Burnham; its title is a reference to Reeve's role as Superman in the 1978–1987 Superman films. Reeve's children Matthew, Alexandra, and Will are featured in the film.

A British-American venture, the film is a co-production by Words + Pictures, Passion Pictures, and Misfits Entertainment in association with Jenco Films, and was acquired for distribution by Warner Bros. Pictures, DC Studios, HBO Documentary Films, CNN Films, and the streaming service Max. Super/Man: The Christopher Reeve Story premiered on January 19, 2024, at the Sundance Film Festival, and received a limited theatrical release in collaboration with Fathom Events in the United States on September 21 and 25, 2024. The film was wide released in North America on October 11.

The documentary was met with widespread acclaim from critics and audiences alike, and was named as one of the top five documentary films of 2024 by the National Board of Review. It received numerous accolades, including winning for Best Documentary at the British Academy Film Awards and the Producers Guild of America, and six awards at the Critics' Choice Documentary Awards (including Best Documentary Feature).

== Plot ==
Reeve has a difficult childhood, with his parents divorcing at a young age and his family tree being complicated due to his parents' several remarriages, and he has a particularly strained relationship with his father, Franklin. Reeve is studying at the Juilliard School and becomes close friends with his classmate Robin Williams. Superman begins casting for its titular hero, and despite offers from several celebrities interested in the film, director Richard Donner wants an unknown actor to play him. Reeve auditions and wins the role despite disapproval from his father and peers.

During filming, he meets British modeling agent Gae Exton, with whom he begins a whirlwind romance. Superman was released in 1978 and became a massive success, with Reeve unanimously praised, solidifying him into a movie star. This success continues with Superman II (1980). However, the recognition he receives for his portrayal of Superman hinders Reeve's career outside the franchise. Reeve lives in London with Exton, who gives birth to Matthew and Alexandra. He is unsatisfied with his career, only agreeing to star in Superman III (1983) and Superman IV: The Quest for Peace (1987) out of obligation. Matthew admits that his father was frequently absent and wouldn't commit due to his upbringing. Reeve and Exton separated in 1987.

Five months after his breakup with Exton, Reeve meets singer and actress Dana Morosini. The two begin dating, and Reeve eventually overcomes his hesitance about marriage and proposes to Dana. They married in April 1992, and their son Will was born in June that same year. Dana is a caring mother figure to both Matthew and Alexandra. On May 27, 1995, Reeve fell from his horse, suffering a spinal cord injury that paralyzes him from the neck down. He muses that he has ruined his family's life, but Dana reassures him, "You're still you, and I love you." He receives support from friends and family, especially Williams, who helps him laugh for the first time since the accident. Reeve is recovering at the Kessler Institute for Rehabilitation, where he befriends other disabled people. At home, Dana and a team of nurses care for him around the clock. With the help of a large van purchased by Williams and his then-wife Marsha, Reeve travels to Los Angeles and makes an appearance at the 68th Academy Awards, where he receives a standing ovation.

Having been an activist for social causes for most of his life, Reeve began using his platform to advocate for disabled people and spinal cord injury research, speaking at several major events, such as the Democratic National Convention. He started the Christopher Reeve Foundation that would open centers, lobby for several bills, and advocate for stem cell research. Reeve regains the ability to make small bodily movements, but he can't wean off the ventilator completely. The Williamses hold annual parties at Reeve's house on the anniversary of his accident to celebrate life. Reeve makes his directorial debut with In the Gloaming (1997) and also directs The Brooke Ellison Story (2004) about fellow quadriplegic Brooke Ellison.

Reeve and his family reflect on how close and fulfilling their relationship has become after his accident. On October 9, 2004, mere hours after Will's hockey game, Reeve fell into a coma and was hospitalized, ultimately dying at the age of 52. Alexandra and Will tearfully recount witnessing their father's death, while Matthew is in a taxi on the way to the hospital when he hears of his father's death. Reeve is mourned around the world by fans and those he had helped through his activism. Dana succeeds her late husband as chairman of the foundation and continues pursuing her passion for singing, but she is later diagnosed with lung cancer. Dana died on March 6, 2006, at the age of 44, leaving Will an orphan at 13 years old.

Matthew, Alexandra, and Will joined the foundation shortly afterward as board members, intending to carry on Reeve and Dana's legacy. The foundation is renamed the Christopher and Dana Reeve Foundation, and several modern-day breakthroughs and milestones involving paralysis research are attributed to Reeve and Dana's activism.

== Cast ==
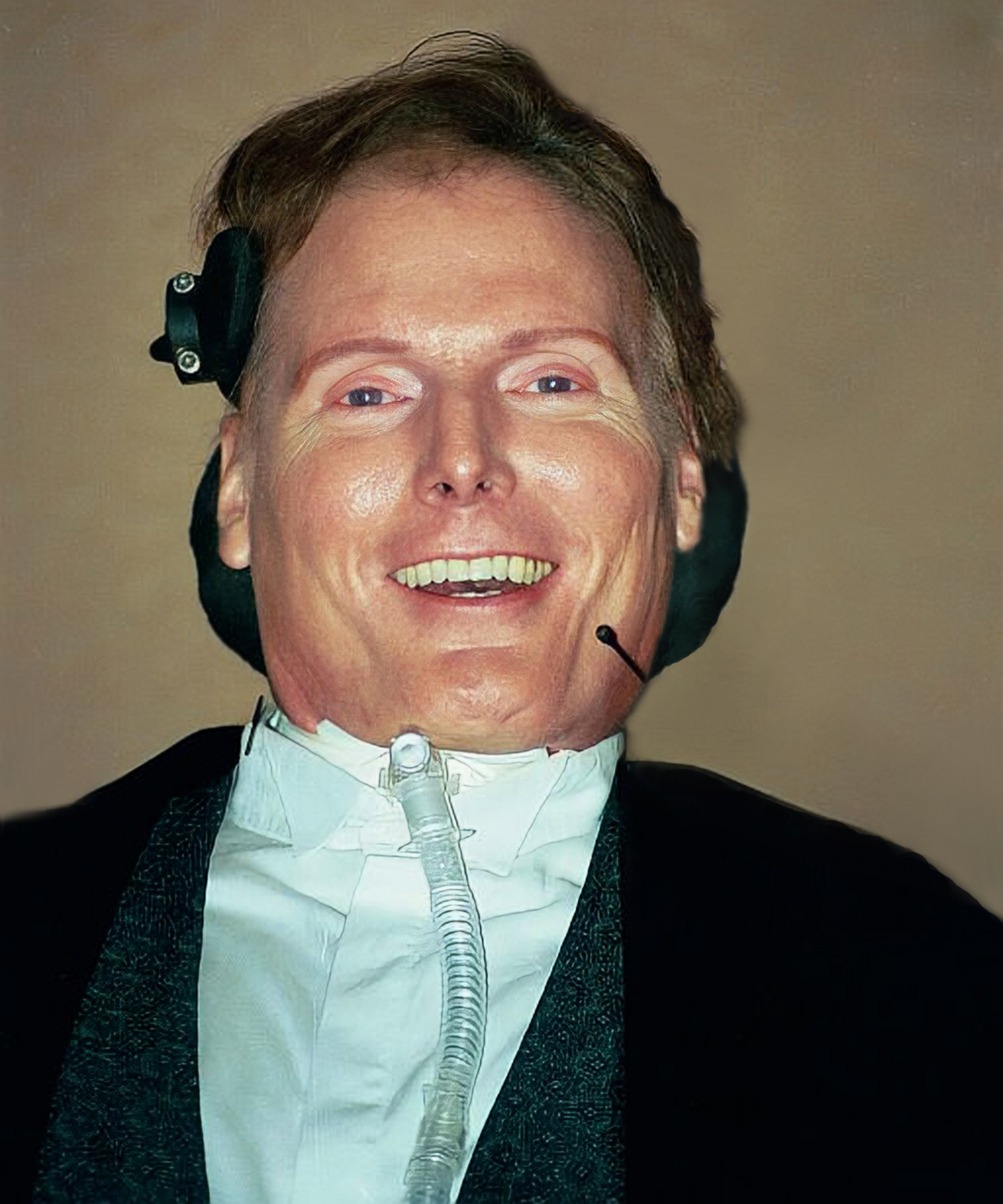
Christopher Reeve (pictured in 2001) is the primary subject of the documentary, with the film alternating between before and after his horse-riding accident.

In addition to featuring footage of Christopher Reeve and Dana Reeve, the film also features Reeve's children Alexandra Reeve Givens, Matthew Reeve, and Will Reeve. Other interviewees included Reeve's half-brother Kevin Johnson, Reeve's former partner Gae Exton, actors Jeff Daniels, Susan Sarandon, Glenn Close, and Whoopi Goldberg, politician John Kerry, activist Brooke Ellison, Superman producer Pierre Spengler, former Christopher and Dana Reeve Foundation Senior Vice President of Government Relations Michael Manganiello, Kessler Institute chief medical officer Dr. Steven Kirshblum, and Reeve's assistant Laurie Hawkins. Archive interview footage of Superman director Richard Donner and Reeve's close friend and comedian Robin Williams is included. Narration by Reeve is taken from his autobiography audiobooks Still Me (1998) and Nothing Is Impossible: Reflections on a New Life (2002).

== Release ==
=== Theatrical ===
Super/Man: The Christopher Reeve Story had its world premiere at the Rose Wagner Performing Arts Center in Salt Lake City, Utah for the Sundance Film Festival on January 19, 2024, followed by a post-screening Q&A session with the film's directors, Ian Bonhôte and Peter Ettedgui, and with Reeve's children. The following month, DC Comics owner Warner Bros. Discovery (WBD) acquired the worldwide theatrical and home media release rights to the documentary for $15 million, and worked with DC Studios co-CEOs James Gunn and Peter Safran and its corporate siblings Warner Bros. Pictures, HBO Documentary Films, CNN Films, and the streaming service Max to do so. The sale was represented by film financing company Cinetic Media.

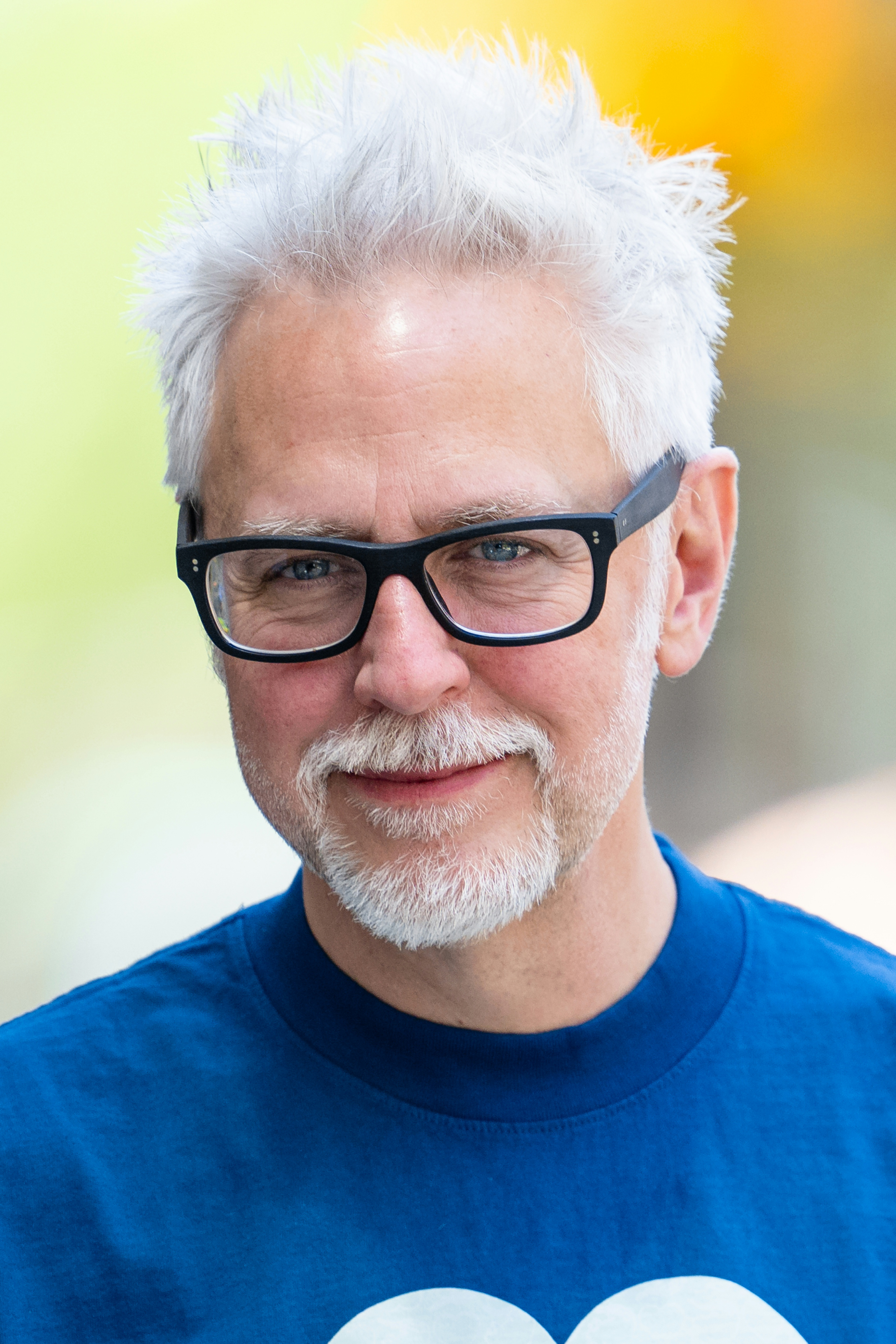
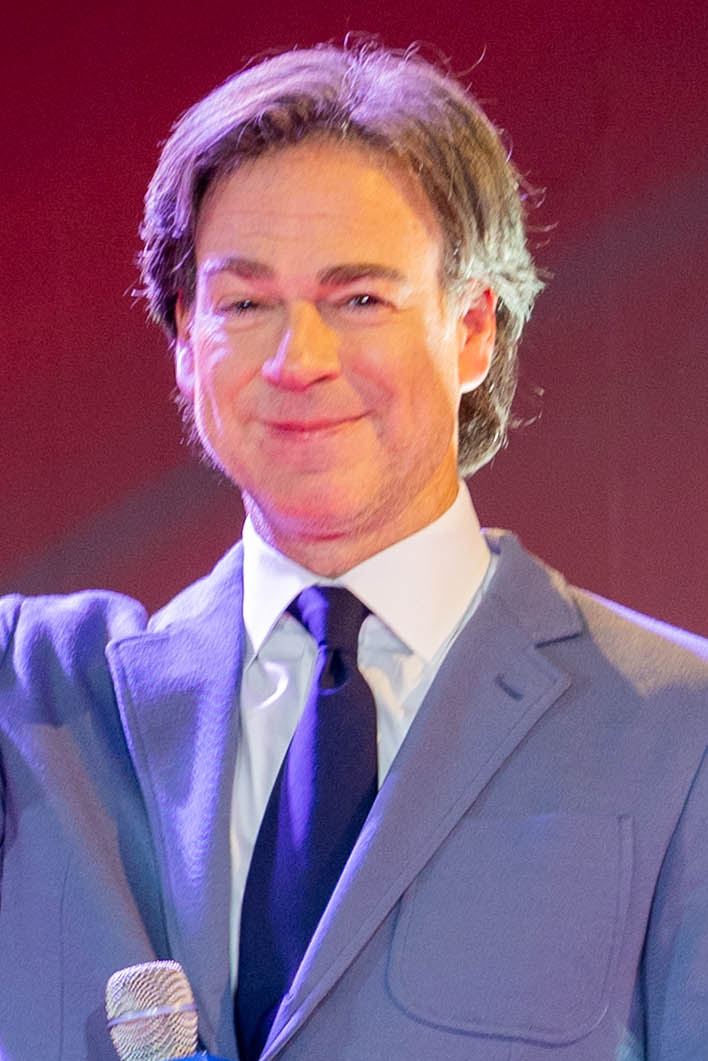
DC Studios co-chairmen James Gunn (left) and Peter Safran (right) pushed for Warner Bros. Pictures to acquire the film's distribution rights.

At the April 2024 CinemaCon, Safran announced that the documentary would be theatrically released in September 2024, under the Warner Bros. Pictures, DC Studios, HBO, and CNN labels. The following month, it was announced that the documentary would have a limited theatrical release on September 21 and 25, 2024, in collaboration with Fathom Events, although, there was a potential for a wide release. September 25, 2024, the day the film received a second theatrical release, was chosen as the date for an encore presentation because it would have been Reeve's 72nd birthday. The film received a wide release in North America on October 11, 2024, followed by international releases in late 2024, including in the United Kingdom on November 1.

=== Home video ===
The film was subsequently made available on other platforms, starting in the United States where it aired on HBO on December 7 and was made available for streaming on Max, and in the United Kingdom where it was broadcast on Sky UK and streaming on Now starting on December 28.

== Reception ==
=== Critical and public responses ===
On the review aggregator website Rotten Tomatoes, 98% of 106 critics' reviews are positive, with an average rating of 8.2/10. The website's consensus reads: "An affectionate retrospective on Christopher Reeve's bravery and heroism in his own personal life, Super/Man takes to the skies in inspirational uplift." On Metacritic, the film holds a weighted average score of 76 out of 100 from 21 critics, indicating "generally favorable reviews". Audiences polled by CinemaScore gave the film a rare average grade of "A+" on an A+ to F scale.

Screen Daily film critic Amber Wilkinson wrote, "The life and work of Superman star Christopher Reeve is framed and largely recounted by his family and friends in Ian Bonhote and Peter Ettedgui's increasingly moving documentary." Monica Castillo of RogerEbert.com described it as "Easily my big festival cry, something that moves you so deeply that the combination of sleep deprivation, altitude, and the movie's subject makes it almost impossible not to get emotional."

Adele spoke highly of the documentary at one of her concerts.

=== Accolades ===
Accolades received by Super/Man: The Christopher Reeve Story
Award	Category	Recipient	Result	Ref.
AARP Movies for Grownups Awards	Best Documentary	Super/Man: The Christopher Reeve Story	Won	
Advanced Imaging Society	Best Documentary	Super/Man: The Christopher Reeve Story	Won	
ACE Eddie Awards	Best Edited Documentary Feature	Otto Burnham	Nominated	
Astra Film Awards	Best Documentary Feature	Super/Man: The Christopher Reeve Story	Won	
Austin Film Critics Association	Best Documentary	Super/Man: The Christopher Reeve Story	Nominated	
Brazil Online Film Award	Best Documentary	Super/Man: The Christopher Reeve Story	Nominated	
British Academy Film Awards	Best Documentary	Super/Man: The Christopher Reeve Story	Won	
BFE Cut Above Awards	Best Edited Single – Documentary or Non-Fiction Programme	Otto Burnham	Won	
BFE Cut Above Awards	Best Edited British Documentary or Non-Fiction Programme	Otto Burnham	Won	
British Independent Film Awards	Best Feature Documentary	Super/Man: The Christopher Reeve Story	Nominated	
Chicago Indie Critics	Best Documentary	Super/Man: The Christopher Reeve Story	Won	
Cinema Audio Society Awards	Outstanding Achievement in Sound Mixing for a Motion Picture – Documentary	Austin Plocher, Greg Gettens, Steve McLaughlin, and Daniel Nicholls	Nominated	
Cinema Eye Honors	Audience Choice Award	Super/Man: The Christopher Reeve Story	Nominated	
Critics' Choice Documentary Awards	Best Documentary Feature	Super/Man: The Christopher Reeve Story	Won (Note: Tied with Will & Harper)	
Critics' Choice Documentary Awards	Best Director	Ian Bonhôte and Peter Ettedgui	Won	
Critics' Choice Documentary Awards	Best Editing	Otto Burnham	Won	
Critics' Choice Documentary Awards	Best Score	Ilan Eshkeri	Won	
Critics' Choice Documentary Awards	Best Archival Documentary	Super/Man: The Christopher Reeve Story	Won	
Critics' Choice Documentary Awards	Best Biographical Documentary	Super/Man: The Christopher Reeve Story	Won	
Dallas–Fort Worth Film Critics Association	Best Documentary	Super/Man: The Christopher Reeve Story	4th place	
Denver Film Critics Society	Best Documentary Feature	Super/Man: The Christopher Reeve Story	Nominated	
DiscussingFilm Critic Awards	Best Documentary Feature	Super/Man: The Christopher Reeve Story	Runner-up	
Dublin Film Critics' Circle	Best Documentary	Super/Man: The Christopher Reeve Story	3rd place	
Florida Film Critics Circle	Best Documentary	Super/Man: The Christopher Reeve Story	Nominated	
Georgia Film Critics Association	Best Documentary Film	Super/Man: The Christopher Reeve Story	Won	
Gold Derby Film Awards	Best Documentary Feature	Super/Man: The Christopher Reeve Story	Won	
Golden Reel Awards	Outstanding Achievement in Sound Editing – Feature Documentary	Greg Gettens, Will Chapman, Claire Ellis, Olly Freemantle, and Zoe Freed	Nominated	
Golden Tomato Awards	Best Documentaries	Super/Man: The Christopher Reeve Story	Nominated	
Greater Western New York Film Critics Association	Best Documentary	Super/Man: The Christopher Reeve Story	Nominated	
HamptonsFilm SummerDocs	Audience Award	Super/Man: The Christopher Reeve Story	Won	
Hawaii Film Critics Society	Best Documentary	Super/Man: The Christopher Reeve Story	Won	
Hollywood Music in Media Awards	Score – Documentary	Ilan Eshkeri	Won	
Indiana Film Journalists Association	Best Documentary	Super/Man: The Christopher Reeve Story	Nominated	
International Film Music Critics Association	Best Original Score for a Documentary	Ilan Eshkeri	Nominated	
Kansas City Film Critics Circle	Best Documentary	Super/Man: The Christopher Reeve Story	Nominated	
Las Vegas Film Critics Society	Best Documentary	Super/Man: The Christopher Reeve Story	Nominated	
Latino Entertainment Journalists Association	Best Documentary	Super/Man: The Christopher Reeve Story	Nominated	
London Film Critics' Circle	Documentary of the Year	Super/Man: The Christopher Reeve Story	Nominated	
Michigan Movie Critics Guild	Best Documentary	Super/Man: The Christopher Reeve Story	Won	
Music City Film Critics Association	Best Documentary	Super/Man: The Christopher Reeve Story	Won	
National Board of Review	Top 5 Documentaries	Super/Man: The Christopher Reeve Story	Won	
New York Film Critics Online	Best Documentary	Super/Man: The Christopher Reeve Story	Nominated	
North Carolina Film Critics Association	Best Documentary Film	Super/Man: The Christopher Reeve Story	Won	
North Texas Film Critics Association	Best Documentary	Super/Man: The Christopher Reeve Story	Won	
Online Film & Television Association	Best Documentary	Super/Man: The Christopher Reeve Story	Won	
Peabody Awards	Documentary	Super/Man: The Christopher Reeve Story	Nominated	
Philadelphia Film Critics Circle	Best Documentary Film	Super/Man: The Christopher Reeve Story	Won	
Phoenix Critics Circle	Best Documentary	Super/Man: The Christopher Reeve Story	Won	
Primetime Emmy Awards	Outstanding Directing for a Documentary/Nonfiction Program	Ian Bonhôte and Peter Ettedgui	Nominated	
Primetime Emmy Awards	Outstanding Writing for a Nonfiction Program	Peter Ettedgui, Ian Bonhôte, and Otto Burnham	Nominated	
Primetime Emmy Awards	Outstanding Music Composition for a Documentary Series or Special (Original Dramatic Score)	Ilan Eshkeri	Nominated	
Primetime Emmy Awards	Outstanding Picture Editing for a Nonfiction Program	Otto Burnham	Nominated	
Producers Guild of America Awards	Outstanding Producer of Documentary Motion Pictures	Lizzie Gillett, Robert Ford, and Ian Bonhôte	Won	
Puerto Rico Critics Association	Best Documentary	Super/Man: The Christopher Reeve Story	Runner-up	
San Diego Film Critics Society	Best Documentary	Super/Man: The Christopher Reeve Story	Won	
San Francisco Bay Area Film Critics Circle	Best Documentary Feature	Super/Man: The Christopher Reeve Story	Nominated	
Satellite Awards	Best Motion Picture – Documentary	Super/Man: The Christopher Reeve Story	Won	
Seattle Film Critics Society	Best Documentary Film	Super/Man: The Christopher Reeve Story	Nominated	
Southern Eastern Film Critics Association	Best Documentary	Super/Man: The Christopher Reeve Story	Runner-up	
St. Louis Film Critics Association	Best Documentary Feature	Super/Man: The Christopher Reeve Story	Runner-up	
Utah Film Critics Association	Best Documentary Feature	Super/Man: The Christopher Reeve Story	Won (Note: Tied with The Remarkable Life of Ibelin)	
Vancouver Film Critics Circle	Best Documentary	Super/Man: The Christopher Reeve Story	Nominated	
Washington D.C. Area Film Critics Association	Best Documentary	Super/Man: The Christopher Reeve Story	Won	
