= Tri-Institutional Training Program in Computational Biology and Medicine =

The Tri-Institutional Training Program in Computational Biology and Medicine or Tri-I CBM is a PhD program that exists as a partnership between the Weill Cornell Medical College (WMC), Rockefeller University, and Memorial Sloan-Kettering Cancer Center (MSKCC). The program is in part designed to encourage collaboration and a sense of connectedness between the two branches of Cornell University and the other institutions in Manhattan (namely, MSKCC and the Rockefeller). Dr. Christina Leslie is the current director of the program.

== Program ==
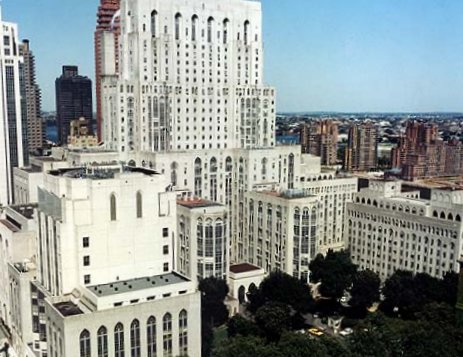
Weill Medical Center

Students may choose a thesis advisor from any of the three institutions for the completion of their PhD. The focus of study is on the various forms of mathematical and computational modeling of biological systems, particularly as they are relevant to medicine. Each year the program accepts 6 students, currently funded by an anonymous gift that established the program in 2000.

Training begins around July 1 when students will begin their first rotation in one of the institutions in Manhattan (WMC or MSKCC). Students then travel to Ithaca for coursework and more rotations at Cornell University for the Fall and Spring terms. During the winter and summer breaks, students return to New York City to complete further rotations (3 weeks in the winter, 12 weeks in the summer). After this first year, students choose a thesis advisor from the three institutions and complete their thesis within the lab.

== Housing ==
For students staying in Manhattan, subsidized housing is guaranteed by the program either in Olin Hall, a dorm-style building, or Lasdon Hall, a modernized apartment building. Some students also live off-campus.

== See also ==
- Tri-Institutional MD-PhD Program
- Cornell University
- Weill Medical College of Cornell University
- Weill Cornell Graduate School of Medical Sciences
- Memorial Sloan-Kettering Cancer Center
