= Walter Sullivan =

Walter Sullivan may refer to:

- Walter Sullivan (Silent Hill), fictional character from the video game Silent Hill 4: The Room
- Walter Francis Sullivan (1928–2012), American Catholic bishop
- Walter J. Sullivan (1923–2014), American politician
- Walter Sullivan (journalist) (1918–1996), science writer
- Walter Sullivan (novelist) (1924–2006), author and literary critic in the United States
- Walter Sullivan (actor), Australian actor
