= Will Reeve =

American television correspondent

- Born: William Elliot Reeve; June 7, 1992 (age 34); Williamstown, Massachusetts
- Education: Middlebury College (BA)
- Occupation: Television correspondent
- Employer: ABC News
- Spouse: Amanda Dubin (m. 2026)
- Parents: Christopher Reeve (father); Dana Reeve (mother)
- Relatives: F. D. Reeve (grandfather); Matthew Reeve (paternal half-brother); Alexandra Reeve Givens (paternal half-sister)

William Elliot "Will" Reeve (born June 7, 1992) is an American television correspondent. He is the youngest child of actor Christopher Reeve. He graduated from Middlebury College in 2014. Prior to joining ABC News in 2018, Reeve was a correspondent at ESPN and the MSG Network. At ABC, he works as a national correspondent across programs including Good Morning America and ABC World News Tonight.

== Early life ==
Reeve was born in Williamstown, Massachusetts. He is the third child and younger son of Superman actor Christopher Reeve and the only child of Dana Reeve. He has two older half-siblings, Matthew and Alexandra, from his father's previous relationship.

Reeve was weeks away from his third birthday when his father suffered a devastating injury while riding a horse and was paralyzed. Despite his injury, Christopher continued to raise Will, even teaching him how to ride a bicycle only through giving directions. Reeve described his childhood as "totally normal" in spite of his parents' fame and his father's disability and that he and his father bonded over sports, also describing his mother as "courageous". Reeve's parents died within seventeen months of each other, with his father dying of cardiac arrest in 2004 and his mother succumbing to lung cancer in 2006. As part of his mother's final requests, Reeve was sent to live with his next door neighbors in Bedford, New York in order to finish school where he started and remain with his friends. Additionally, his older half-siblings acted as parental roles. He continued to play sports and act in musicals during high school.

== Acting career ==
Reeve made a few appearances in film as a child actor, getting roles in three films directed by his father. He appeared as young versions of characters in the 1997 HBO film In the Gloaming and 2004's The Brooke Ellison Story, which were both television films, then voiced an unnamed character in Everyone's Hero.

== News career ==
Reeve first interned at Good Morning America while attending Middlebury College. After graduating, he gained a position with SportsCenter at ESPN in 2016 as a reporter, correspondent, and contributing anchor. During this time, he also hosted The Hockey Show for MSG Network, gaining the position after MSG viewed his work at ESPN.

=== ABC News/Good Morning America ===
After two years at ESPN, Reeve took a full time position with GMA in November 2018.

Reeve gained notoriety during the COVID-19 pandemic in April 2020 when he appeared on-camera while reporting from home seemingly without pants. Several Twitter users quickly called him out, but Reeve reassured them he was wearing shorts in preparation for a workout afterwards. He also attributed the blooper to setting up his own camera at a bad angle and promised to wear pants going forward. Reeve followed up one month later with a GMA segment on dressing presentably while on video calls for remote work, which had increased due to the pandemic.

While on-assignment in Alaska in 2021 for GMA's "Rise and Shine" series, Reeve wrote a Father's Day editorial about his father's fascination with whales in the state, and about how he also gained that fascination after watching a documentary film that his father filmed while scuba diving with the animals just months before his paralysis. Reeve described his catharsis about finally realizing his dream to venture to Alaska and witness the whales for himself.

== Personal life ==
In 2018, after becoming a reporter, Reeve penned and recited a "note to self" addressed to himself at age 13, which aired on CBS This Morning, detailing his life journey after his parents' deaths, as well as his desires to honor their legacies and become a sports anchor on ESPN. Reeve, along with his siblings, is a board member of the Christopher and Dana Reeve Foundation, and has spoken publicly about his work with the foundation and living with his father's disability.

Reeve is a sports and fitness enthusiast, lifting weights and cross-training in addition to running in the New York City Marathon in 2016, which he did with the goal of raising $35,000 for his family's foundation. He is also a fan of the New York Rangers.

In January 2026, Reeve married event planner Amanda Dubin. In September 2026, Reeve announced that he had been diagnosed earlier that year with testicular cancer, but after surgeries and chemotherapy treatment, he was declared cancer-free.

== Filmography ==
=== Film ===
Year	Title	Role	Notes
1997	In the Gloaming	Young Danny	
2004	The Brooke Ellison Story	Young David	
2006	Everyone's Hero	Big Kid	Voice role
2025	Superman	Reporter	Cameo appearance
