= Katharine Hsu =

American physician-scientist

Katharine Chia-Rae Hsu
- Education: Stanford University; Cornell University
- Known for: Director of Tri-Institutional MD–PhD Program since 2021
- Scientific career
- Fields: Hematology, oncology
- Workplaces: Memorial Sloan Kettering Cancer Center
- Thesis: Mechanisms of TNF receptor action: Studies using chimeric receptor mutants (1993)
- Doctoral advisor: Moses Chao

Katharine Chia-Rae Hsu is an American physician-scientist in the field of research in human natural killer cells. Hsu has worked as an attending physician and member at Memorial Sloan Kettering Cancer Center.

She has been a professor of medicine at Weill Cornell Medicine, and director of the Tri-Institutional MD–PhD Program.

== Education ==
Hsu received a Bachelor of Science and a Master of Science from Stanford University in 1987. She received a Doctor of Philosophy in cell biology in 1993 and a Doctor of Medicine in 1994, both from Cornell University.

During her doctoral studies at Cornell University, she studied at the laboratory of Moses Chao. Her doctoral dissertation was titled, Mechanisms of TNF receptor action: Studies using chimeric receptor mutants.

Hsu completed an internship and residency in internal medicine at Brigham and Women's Hospital in Boston in 1997. She completed a postdoctoral fellowship in hematology and oncology at Memorial Sloan Kettering Cancer Center in New York City in 2002.

== Career ==
Hsu joined the faculty of Memorial Sloan Kettering Cancer Center where she has worked as an attending physician and member in the Immuno-oncology Program. She specializes in the treatment of blood cancers. Her field of research is natural killer cells in humans and their role in killing cancer cells and cells with viruses.

Hsu was inducted into the American Society for Clinical Investigation in 2012. She is a member of the Association of American Physicians.

She became a professor of medicine at Weill Cornell Medicine in 2017. In April 2021, Hsu was named the director of the Tri-Institutional MD–PhD Program, succeeding Olaf Sparre Andersen.
