= Moses Chao =

American neuroscientist

Moses V. Chao (born May 16, 1952) is a neuroscientist and university professor at NYU Langone Health Medical Center. He studies the mechanisms of neuronal growth factor and teaches courses in cell biology, neuroscience, and physiology. He is a Fellow of the American Association for the Advancement of Science and was President of the Society for Neuroscience in 2012.

== Early life and education ==
In 1972, Chao earned a Bachelor of Arts degree in biochemistry at Pomona College in Claremont, California. In 1980, he earned a Ph.D. in biochemistry at University of California, Los Angeles. He researched chromatin structure at the Molecular Biology Institute at UCLA. After earning his doctorate, Chao worked as a research fellow at Columbia University from 1980 to 1983, where he carried out his postdoctoral research with molecular biologist Richard Axel.

== Research ==
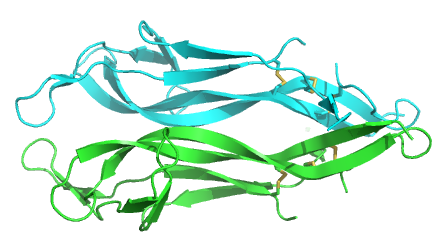
Human nerve growth factor, which is Chao's research focus at NYU.

Since 2019, Chao has been a lead investigator at New York University investigating the mechanisms behind specificity of neuronal growth factor (NGF), with specific emphasis on neuronal growth, differentiation, and signaling. A landmark discovery of Chao's lab was the identification of genes responsible for encoding the receptors of NGF. The lab is currently investigating the mechanisms of trophic factors used to alter plasticity in synapses. A significant area of focus for Chao and his research associates are neurotrophins. Neutrophins act in the nervous system to assist cells in differentiation, as well as survival mechanisms and higher-order functions, including addiction, pain, neurodegenerative conditions, anxiety, and depression. Chao has also researched the impact of exercise on the brain.

== Faculty positions ==
As of 2019, Chao has worked as a professor in the departments of Cell Biology, Neuroscience and Physiology, and Psychiatry at NYU Langone Health Medical Center. In addition, he is also the coordinator of the Molecular Biology Program. In the past, he has held a professorship in Cell Biology at the Weill Cornell Medical College. Additionally, he has held positions including Secretary, Chair of the Committee on Committees, Senior Editor of the Journal of Neuroscience, Chair of the Program Committee, and President of Society for Neuroscience in 2012. Chao has also been a member of the editorial board of the Journal of Neuroscience (Senior Editor, 11 years), Molecular and Cellular Neuroscience as well as the Journal of Biological Chemistry. Finally, he has served as a board member at Christopher & Dana Reeve Foundations, Simons Foundation, Vollum Institute, and St Jude's Cancer Center.

== Awards and honors ==
Chao was named a Fellow of the American Association for the Advancement of Science in 2008. Chao was also a recipient of a Zenith Award from the Alzheimer's Association in 1991 – 1994, Jacob Javits Neuroscience Investigator Award from 1996 – 2003, the Julius Axelrod Award from the Society for Neuroscience in 2017, and a Guggenheim Fellowship in 1994.
