= Tri-Institutional MD–PhD Program =

Academic program in New York City

- Established: 1972–1984 (original programs); 1991 (current program)
- Affiliations: Weill Cornell Medicine; Rockefeller University; Sloan Kettering Institute
- Director: Katharine Hsu
- Academic staff: 6
- Location: New York City, New York, U.S.
- Website: mdphd.weill.cornell.edu

The Tri-Institutional MD–PhD Program is a MD–PhD degree program based in Upper East Side, New York City. Introduced in 1991, the current program is operated by Weill Cornell Medicine, Rockefeller University, and Memorial Sloan Kettering Cancer Center's Sloan Kettering Institute.

The program is currently directed by Katharine C. Hsu.

== Profile ==
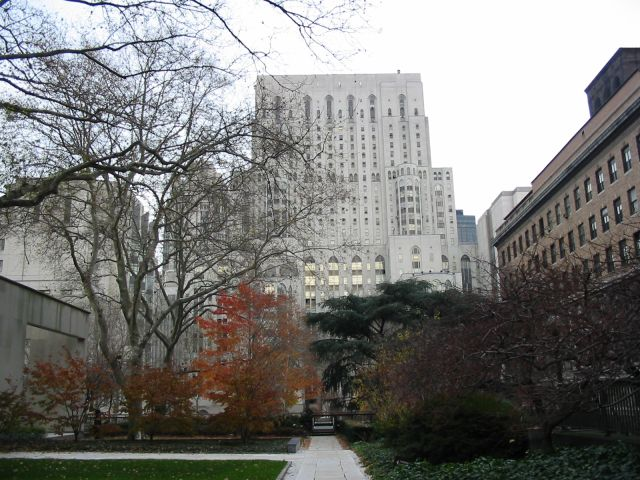
Weill Cornell Medical Center as seen from the campus of Rockefeller University

Students who complete the program are awarded an M.D. from Weill Cornell Medical College and a Ph.D. from either Weill Cornell Medicine Graduate School of Medical Sciences, Rockefeller University, or the Gerstner Sloan Kettering Graduate School of Biomedical Sciences.

In 2019, the program processed over 500 applications for 18 spots. These positions are funded by the National Institutes of Health Medical Scientist Training Program (MSTP) for the full length of training, which is typically 7–8 years.

== Directors ==
- Olaf Sparre Andersen
- Katharine C. Hsu 2021-present

== See also ==
- Memorial Sloan Kettering Cancer Center
- Rockefeller University
- Tri-Institutional Training Program in Computational Biology and Medicine
- Weill Graduate School of Medical Sciences of Cornell University
- Weill Medical College of Cornell University
