= Walter Sullivan (novelist) =

American novelist

Walter Sullivan

Walter Laurence Sullivan (January 4, 1924 in Nashville, Tennessee – August 15, 2006 in Nashville) was a southern novelist and literary critic. He published a number of works and was an English professor at Vanderbilt University for more than fifty years. He wrote chiefly about the literature, the society, and the values of the South. He was a founding charter member of the Fellowship of Southern Writers.

== Life ==
Walter Sullivan was born in Nashville. His father died three months after he was born, and Walter, an only child, spent his childhood living with his mother and various aunts, uncles, and grandparents. After attending local schools, he began his studies at Vanderbilt University in Nashville in 1941, studying creative writing under Donald Davidson. He served in the Marines during World War II but the war ended before he was assigned to combat. He resumed his studies at Vanderbilt and graduated in 1947.

He married Jane Harrison and they moved to Iowa City, where he earned an MFA at the University of Iowa, studying under Andrew Nelson Lytle. He then returned to Vanderbilt and taught in the English department there from 1949 until his retirement in 2001.

He deplored the change in English studies from the close study of the great texts to the dominance of various forms of theory, and was one of the founders of the Fellowship of Southern Writers in 1987. "We [the members of the FSW] believed that language could accurately communicate an author's intentions and that truth or an aspect thereof was available to those who were sufficiently gifted to find it. But ... our beliefs and our writings, our very selves, were anathema to a large part of the literary world." He gave up lecturing on British and American fiction and spent the later decades of his career teaching only fiction writing.

An Episcopalian, he became disenchanted with the direction the Church was taking, and helped form the Society for the Preservation of the Book of Common Prayer in the 1960s. In the late 1970s he and Jane joined the Catholic Church.

He and Jane had a daughter, Pamela (Pam), and two sons, Walter Laurence Jr. (Larry) and John.

== Walter Sullivan Prize ==
Beginning in 2007, the Sewanee Review has awarded an annual prize in Sullivan's name to "an author published in the magazine that calendar year whose work demonstrates marked accomplishment in fiction or the criticism of fiction". Sullivan contributed "fiction and criticism for over four decades" to the Sewanee Review.

Recipients have been:

- 2007 — Algis Valiunas
- 2008 — Ed Minus
- 2009 — L.E. Holder
- 2010 — Edwin M. Yoder Jr.
- 2011 — Laura C. Stevenson
- 2012 — Richard Jacobs
- 2013 — David Heddendorf
- 2014 — Susan McCallum-Smith
- 2015 — Ryan Wilson
- 2017 — Sidik Fofana
- 2018 — Austen Leah Rose
- 2019 — Jamil Jan Kochai
- 2022 — Cherline Bazile and Rickey Fayne
- 2023 — Josie Abugov

== Books ==
=== Non-fiction ===
- Death by Melancholy: Essays on Modern Southern Fiction (1972)
- A Requiem for the Renascence: The State of Fiction in the Modern South (1976)
- A Band of Prophets: The Vanderbilt Agrarians after Fifty Years (edited, with William C. Havard) (1982)
- Allen Tate: A Recollection (1988)
- In Praise of Blood Sports and Other Essays (1990)
- The War the Women Lived: Female Voices from the Confederate South (edited) (1995)
- Place in American Fiction: Excursions and Explorations (2004)
- Nothing Gold Can Stay: A Memoir (2006)

=== Fiction ===
- Sojourn of a Stranger (1957)
- The Long, Long Love (1959)
- A Time to Dance (1995)

These three books are novels. His numerous short stories remain uncollected.
