= Alexandra Reeve Givens =

British-American lawyer, technology policy expert, nonprofit executive

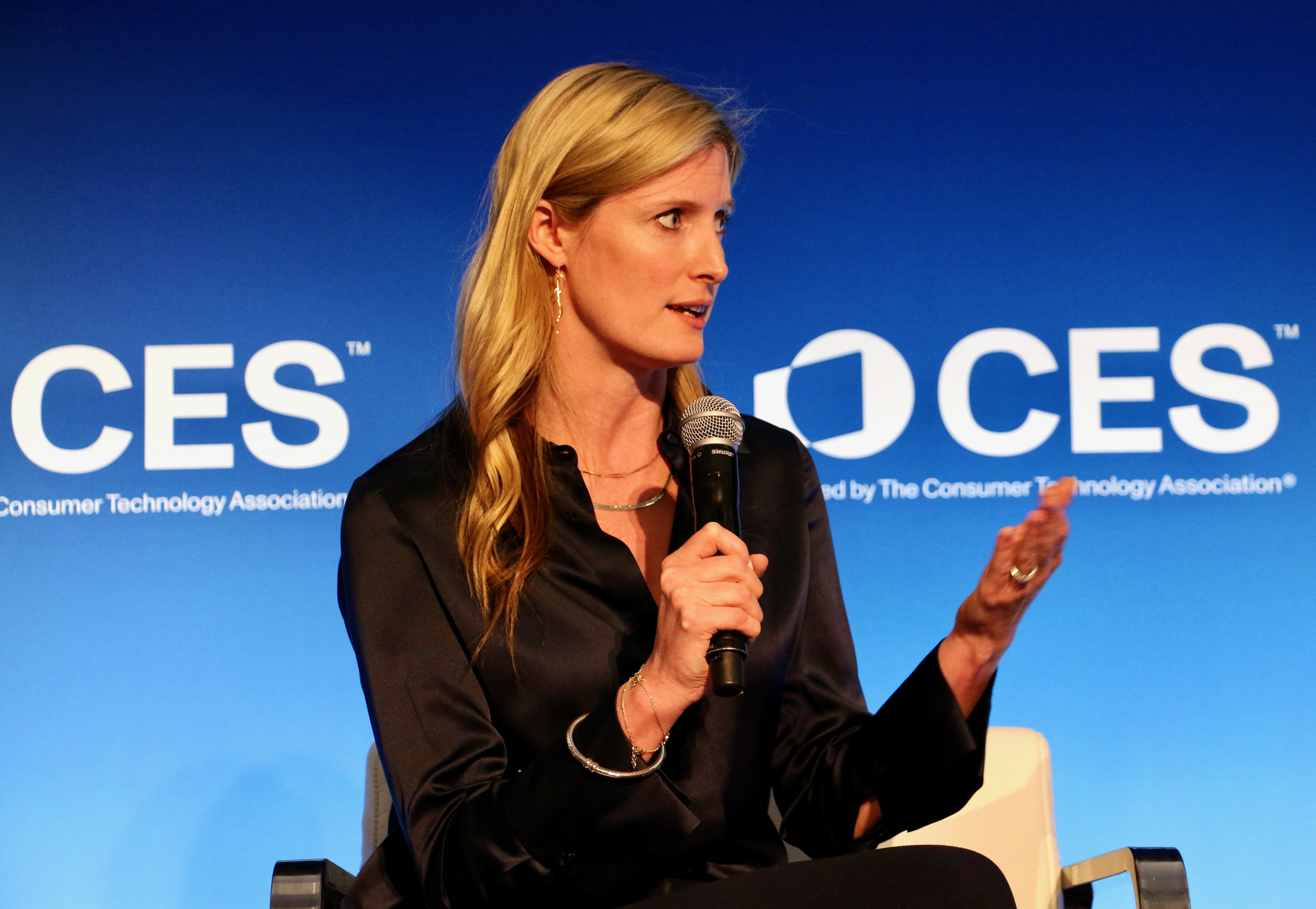
- Givens in 2025
- Born: Alexandra Exton Reeve; November 25, 1983 (age 42); London, England
- Education: Yale University (BA); Columbia Law School (JD)
- Occupation: Lawyer
- Years active: 2006–present
- Board member of: Christopher & Dana Reeve Foundation
- Spouse: Garren Givens
- Children: 2
- Father: Christopher Reeve
- Relatives: F. D. Reeve (grandfather); Matthew Reeve (brother); Dana Reeve (stepmother); Will Reeve (paternal half-brother)

Alexandra Exton Reeve Givens (born November 25, 1983) is a British-American lawyer, technology policy expert, and nonprofit executive. She serves as the President and Chief Executive Officer of the Center for Democracy & Technology (CDT), a nonpartisan nonprofit organization focused on protecting civil rights and liberties in the digital age. Givens is also known for her advocacy in online privacy, democratic accountability in technology, and ethical governance of emerging technologies.

== Early life and education ==
Givens was born in London, England. She is the only daughter of actor and activist Christopher Reeve and Gae Exton. She has an older brother Matthew Reeve, and a younger half-brother, television reporter Will Reeve. She holds a Bachelor of Arts from Yale University and a Juris Doctor from Columbia Law School.

== Career ==
Givens began her career as a litigator at Cravath, Swaine & Moore in New York City and taught for nine years as an adjunct professor at Columbia Law School and Georgetown Law. Givens served as Chief Counsel for IP and Antitrust on the United States Senate Judiciary Committee, working on innovation and consumer protection policy.

She later became the founding Executive Director of the Institute for Technology Law & Policy at Georgetown University Law Center, where she directed research, policy initiatives, and strategic programming at the intersection of law and technology.

She serves as the President and Chief Executive Officer of the Center for Democracy & Technology (CDT), a nonpartisan nonprofit organization focused on protecting civil rights and liberties in the digital age.

In a 2023 televised interview with Bloomberg UK, Givens discussed the global landscape for AI regulation, further establishing her as a key voice in international tech policy debates. She has also addressed the impact of election-related misinformation on non-English speakers, appearing on Scripps News in early 2024.

In her current role as CEO of CDT, she leads an international team of lawyers, technologists, and policy experts. Under her leadership, the organization has expanded its global reach and deepened its work on issues such as AI governance, internet freedom, surveillance reform, and algorithmic accountability. Givens frequently testifies before Congress and appears in major media outlets, including Axios, CNN, CBS News, NPR, The Washington Post, Fast Company, and Wired. Her writing has been published in Slate, Barron's, Ms., Tech Policy Press, and Democracy. She was profiled in Columbia Law School's "How I Got Here" series, which detailed her career path and public interest motivations.

== Board and advisory roles ==
Givens serves on the board of the Urban Institute, and the Christopher & Dana Reeve Foundation, which supports individuals living with paralysis and spinal cord injuries. She is also a member of advisory boards for the Aspen Institute, World Economic Forum, Partnership on AI, KKR, and various technology companies. Her World Economic Forum profile highlights her leadership on responsible tech and policy reform. In addition, she is a judge for the Webby Awards and is listed as a leading privacy and technology expert by the International Association of Privacy Professionals (IAPP).

== Personal life ==
Givens married Garren Givens in 2008. They have a son and a daughter.
