= Barbara L. Hempstead =

American hematologist, neuroscientist, physician-scientist, academic administrator

- Education: Tufts University; Washington University in St. Louis
- Scientific career
- Fields: Hematology and neuroscience
- Workplaces: Cornell University

Barbara Louise Hempstead is an American hematologist, neuroscientist, and academic administrator serving as the dean of the Weill Cornell Graduate School of Medical Sciences since 2019. She is the O. Wayne Isom Professor of Medicine.

== Life ==
Hempstead earned a bachelor's degree in biology from Tufts University in 1976. She completed a M.D. and Ph.D. in cellular biology from Washington University School of Medicine in 1982. Her dissertation was titled, The Cell Surface Receptor for Immunoglobulin E: Characterization of the Receptor from Human Basophils, Rat Mast Cells and Rat Basophilic Leukemia Cells. She completed an internal medicine residency and a fellowship in hematology and medical oncology at the NewYork-Presbyterian Hospital and Weill Cornell Medical Center.

In 1987, Hempstead became a faculty member at Weill Cornell Medicine. She joined the neuroscience program at Weill Cornell Graduate School of Medical Sciences in 1994. The following year, she joined its physiology, biophysics, and systems biology program. She was promoted to professor of medicine in 2001. From 2004 to 2012, she served as the co-chief of the division of hematology and medical oncology. She was the associate dean for faculty development from 2012 to 2016. In 2015, she became the senior associate dean for education. She is the O. Wayne Isom Professor of Medicine. On January 14, 2019, she succeeded Carl F. Nathan as the dean of the Weill Cornell Graduate School of Medical Sciences.
