= Matthew Reeve =

British-American producer, director, screenwriter, and activist

- Born: Matthew Exton Reeve; 20 December 1979 (age 46); London, England
- Education: Brown University (BA); New York University (MBA, MFA)
- Occupations: Film producer; film director; screenwriter; activist
- Years active: 2002–present
- Board member of: Christopher & Dana Reeve Foundation
- Spouse: Anna Lo Westlin
- Children: 2
- Father: Christopher Reeve
- Relatives: F. D. Reeve (grandfather); Alexandra Reeve Givens (sister); Dana Reeve (stepmother); Will Reeve (paternal half-brother)

Matthew Exton Reeve (born 20 December 1979) is a British-American producer, director, screenwriter, and activist. Born in London, he is the elder son of actor Christopher Reeve. His mother was Reeve's long-term partner Gae Exton. Reeve has a sister, Alexandra Reeve Givens, and a half-brother, television reporter and anchor Will Reeve.

== Career ==
After graduating from Brown University in 2002, Reeve produced and directed the documentary Christopher Reeve: Hope in Motion, which won the Communicator Award for Excellence in documentary filmmaking and was nominated for an Emmy. The film first aired on ABC on September 18, 2002 (as Christopher Reeve: Courageous Steps) and then later on BBC One on 9 February 2003 and in numerous other countries.

In 2007, Hope in Motion and its follow-up film, Choosing Hope, were released on DVD.

In 2009, Reeve released Over the Water, a documentary about World Champion kiteboarder Aaron Hadlow, which Reeve filmed, produced and directed over a period of three years. Also in 2009, Reeve was admitted into the NYU MBA/MFA dual degree program, a joint Master's program at the NYU Stern School of Business and NYU Tisch School of the Arts, from which he graduated in 2012.

== Activism ==
In June 2006, Reeve joined the board of directors of the Christopher & Dana Reeve Foundation, three months after the death of his stepmother Dana Reeve. He also serves on their Quality of Life committee and Executive Committee, and in 2014 became Vice-Chair of International Development. In 2009 he ran the New York City Marathon to raise money for spinal cord injury research, and in 2014 he sponsored a study of epidural stimulation.

In 2010, Reeve and his sister, Alexandra Reeve Givens, were the recipients of the National Leadership Award at the Castle Connolly Awards.

In 2010, Reeve gave the keynote commencement address to the graduating class of the Stony Brook University School of Health Technology.

In 2012, he was a keynote speaker at the Spinal Cord Injury Network's Connections 2012 convention in Sydney, Australia. He also ran the annual City2Surf event on their behalf.
