= Laura C. Stevenson =

American author

Laura C. Stevenson is an American author. She graduated from the University of Michigan in 1968 and from Yale University in 1974. In 2023, her book All Men Glad and Wise was named as a finalist for best Genre Fiction by the Independent Publishers of New England. She was married to F. D. Reeve. Stevenson is based in Vermont and taught at Marlboro College.

== Books ==
- All Men Glad and Wise
- Return in Kind
- Liar from Vermont
- Happily After All
- All the King's Horses
- A Castle in the Window
- Praise and Paradox: Merchants And Craftsmen In Elizabethan Popular Literature, 1558-1603
- The Island and the Ring
