= Everyone's Hero =

2006 animated film

- Theatrical release poster
- Directed by: Christopher Reeve; Daniel St. Pierre; Colin Brady
- Screenplay by: Robert Kurtz; Jeff Hand
- Story by: Howard Jonas
- Produced by: Ron Tippe; Igor Khait
- Starring: William H. Macy; Rob Reiner; Brian Dennehy; Raven-Symoné; Robert Wagner; Richard Kind; Dana Reeve; Jake T. Austin; Joe Torre; Mandy Patinkin; Forest Whitaker; Whoopi Goldberg
- Cinematography: Jan Carlee; Andy Wang
- Edited by: John Bryant
- Music by: John Debney
- Production company: IDT Entertainment
- Distributed by: 20th Century Fox
- Release date: September 15, 2006
- Running time: 87 minutes
- Country: United States
- Language: English
- Budget: $35 million
- Box office: $16.6 million

Everyone's Hero is a 2006 American animated sports comedy film directed by Christopher Reeve, Daniel St. Pierre and Colin Brady. Starring Jake T. Austin, Rob Reiner, William H. Macy, Raven-Symoné and Whoopi Goldberg, along with many others. The film was produced by IDT Entertainment in Toronto with portions outsourced to Reel FX Creative Studios and was distributed domestically by 20th Century Fox.

The film was theatrically released on September 15, 2006, to mixed reviews from critics and was a financial flop, earning $16.6 million on a $35 million budget. It also marked the final film for Dana Reeve before her death in March 2006, six months before the release of the film; it was dedicated to her and her husband, Christopher Reeve, who co-directed the film, and died in October 2004.

== Plot ==
In 1932 New York City during the Great Depression, Yankee Irving is a 10-year-old baseball fan who is picked on by the other kids for his poor athletic skills. On that day, he finds a talking baseball and he names him Screwie. Yankee's father, Stanley, works as a custodian at Yankee Stadium. While the two are on the premises, a thief disguised as a security guard steals Babe Ruth's "lucky" bat, Darlin'. Stanley is falsely accused of the crime and is temporarily fired until Darlin' can be found. After being wrongly blamed for the crime and being sent to his room by his father, Yankee learns that the real thief is Chicago Cubs pitcher Lefty Maginnis. Lefty works for the Cubs' general manager Napoleon Cross, who desires to see the Cubs defeat the New York Yankees during the World Series.

Determined to reclaim the bat and save his family from being evicted, Yankee goes to the train station and takes it from Lefty but fails to get off the train before it takes them to another stop. Darlin' has the ability to talk and urges Yankee to take her back to Babe Ruth in Chicago, where the next World Series game will be played. During the trip, Lefty attempts to steal the bat from Yankee during a chase. Yankee decides to return Darlin' to Babe Ruth, clearing his father's name and saving his job. Meanwhile, his parents start searching for Yankee after discovering that he left home. Yankee meets others who help him in his quest, such as hobos Andy, Louis, and Jack; a girl named Marti Brewster and her father; a Negro league pitcher named Lonnie Brewster, who helps him drive to Chicago and teaches Yankee to set his feet right while batting; and Babe Ruth himself. Lefty steals Darlin' and gives her to Cross, who kidnaps Yankee. During the game, Cross traps Yankee inside the office and reveals his plans to him.

When Yankee escapes the office, he evades several security guards and returns Darlin' to Babe. Cross tries to talk Babe out of accepting the victory, saying that Yankee is too young to be a counting player. Despite this, Babe gives Yankee a confidence boost by telling him that "it's not the bat, it's the batter". Yankee hits Screwie after two strikes. While numerous Cubs players try to tag Yankee out, he dodges and trips them. Lefty makes his last attempt to tag him out, but Yankee outsmarts him by jumping over him and landing on home plate, scoring a run. This restores the morale of the Yankees, who score seven more runs to take the lead and win the World Series. Stanley apologizes to Yankee for being too hard on him and congratulates him for being the best player.

The revelation of Darlin's theft leads to the arrest of Cross, who says that Yankee was a fan who cheated. When his involvement as an accomplice and a cheater is also revealed, Lefty is kicked off the team and arrested. Stanley's name is cleared, and he is reinstated as the stadium's custodian. Yankee, his parents, and his new baseball friends, Screwie and Darlin', celebrate the Yankees' World Series win in a victory parade where he becomes an honorary player, while Cross works as the Babe Ruth bobblehead's vendor and Lefty works as a street cleaner as part of their work release. Yankee happily plays catch with Screwie and the hobos' Boxer dog.

== Voice cast ==
- Jake T. Austin as Yankee Irving, a young 10-year-old boy who dreams of being a baseball player, looks up to his idol Babe Ruth, and who saves his dashing and beautiful baseball bat, Darlin'.
- Rob Reiner as Screwie, a sarcastic, wisecracking talking baseball who bickers with his counterpart, Darlin'.
- Whoopi Goldberg as Darlin', a loyal but egotistical talking baseball bat owned by Babe Ruth; Babe and Darlin' are inseparable; Babe takes her everywhere he goes and will protect her at any costs. Darlin' loves her owner and feels safe around him.
- Robin Williams (uncredited) as Napoleon Cross, the corrupt general manager of the Chicago Cubs and Lefty's boss.
- William H. Macy as Lefty Maginnis, a cheating baseball pitcher who is sent by Napoleon Cross to steal Babe's bat Darlin', and fights Yankee over her.
- Brian Dennehy as Babe Ruth, the New York Yankees baseball player.
- Raven-Symoné as Marti Brewster, Lonnie and Rosetta's daughter.
- Mandy Patinkin as Stanley Irving, Yankee's father and the custodian at Yankee Stadium.
- Forest Whitaker as Lonnie "The Rooster" Brewster, an African American "king of the curve ball" who is the star pitcher for the Cincinnati Tigers, the father of Marti and the husband of Rosetta.
- Dana Reeve as Emily Irving, Yankee's mother.
- Robert Wagner as Mr. Robinson, the general manager of the New York Yankees and Stanley's boss.
- Richard Kind as Hobo Andy / Maitre'D.
- Joe Torre as New York Yankees manager.
- Cherise Booth as Rosetta Brewster, Lonnie's wife and Marti's mother.
- Ritchie Allen as Officer Bryant.
- Jason Harris Katz (credited as Jason Harris) as Announcer.
- Ed Helms as Hobo Louie.
- Ray Iannicelli as Conductors/Umpire.
- Gideon Jacobs as Bully Kid Tubby.
- Marcus Maurice as Willie.
- Will Reeve as Big Kid.
- Ron Tippe as Hobo Jack.
- Jesse Bronstein as Sandlot Kid #1.
- Ralph Coppola as Sandlot Kid #2.
- Conor White as Bully Kid Arnold.

== Production ==
The film initially began as a bedtime story written by Howard Jonas of IDT Entertainment. Years later, Jonas decided to develop a feature film based on the story and directly approached Christopher Reeve to direct it, with Robert Kurtz and Jeff Hand writing the script.

Reeve later died of heart failure in October 2004, at which point, Daniel St. Pierre and Colin Brady were hired as co-directors. St. Pierre and Brady opted to remain as close as possible to Reeve's original vision, which was also overseen by Reeve's wife Dana.

The film was originally named Yankee Irving during production. On March 22, 2006, IDT announced that the film had been renamed Everyone's Hero.

== Release ==
On June 7, 2005, IDT and 20th Century Fox announced a two-year pact allowing Fox to distribute up to four computer-animated films from the studio domestically; Yankee Irving being the first under the agreement. International sale rights were held under IDT Entertainment Sales.

=== Home media ===
Everyone's Hero was released on DVD on March 20, 2007, by 20th Century Fox Home Entertainment. The movie was released on Blu-ray on March 5, 2013, exclusively at Walmart stores. The movie premiered on Disney+ on May 7, 2021, in Canada and the United States; it was previously available for streaming on HBO Max.

== Reception ==
=== Box office ===
In its opening weekend, the film grossed $6.1 million in 2,896 theaters in the United States and Canada, ranking #3 at the box office, behind Gridiron Gang and The Black Dahlia. By the end of its run, Everyone's Hero grossed $14.5 million in the US, and $2.1 million internationally, for an approximate total of $16.6 million worldwide.

=== Critical reception ===
On the review aggregator website Rotten Tomatoes, 42% of 67 critics' reviews are positive, with an average rating of 5.1/10. The website's consensus reads: "Everyone's Hero is such a predictable and bland tale that it'll appeal mostly to little kids; others seeking something in Pixar's league are looking in the wrong ballpark." Metacritic, which uses a weighted average, assigned the film a score of 51 out of 100, based on 20 critics, indicating "mixed or average" reviews. Audiences polled by CinemaScore gave the film an average grade of "A−" on a scale of A+ to F.

Jack Matthews of the New York Daily News wrote, "Whoever wanders into the theater should leave a winner."

LA Weekly called the themes "fairly pro forma" and cited the film's "antique Rockwellian look" as "its greatest pleasure".

Gregory Kirschling of Entertainment Weekly rated it "B−", and wrote, "Everyone's Hero re-creates Depression-era America with surprisingly agreeable anachronistic panache", although he criticized the character designs.

The Austin Chronicle primarily criticized Everyone's Hero for focusing too much on sentimentality over entertaining moments.

Tasha Robinson of The A.V. Club opined that the film "ranges from improbable to nonsensical to just plain dull. [...] The lame banter, the one-note characters, the predictable clumsy stabs at emotional uplift, or the booger jokes [don't help]."

Screwie and Darlin' were bashed in a review by The Washington Post's Stephen Hunter, panning their inability to "move or express emotion".

Slant Magazine's Ed Gonzalez disliked the lack of reasoning for anthropomorphic baseball gear for being "random". The anachronisms, such as its out-of-time slang, pop-song-dominated soundtrack, and use of an African-American-voiced talking bat, were also panned, with Gonzalez calling the Great Depression setting "nonexistent".

The story did have its supporters. Variety reviewer Joe Leydon honored Everyone's Hero as a "modestly engaging mix of broad comedy and nostalgic fable", picaresque plot and the inclusion of a Negro league player. However, in addition to disliking its gross humor, he questioned the low-key portrayal of segregation that occurred in the 1930s era in which the film is set. He also suggested that the film would have a hard time selling to children: "The toon's target demo — i.e., toddlers and grade-schoolers — are too young to know about the Reeves, and pic could be a hard sell to youngsters who aren't baseball fanatics and recognize Babe Ruth only as the name of a candy bar."

Seattle Post-Intelligencer writer Manny Lewis concluded, "The film certainly will appeal to kids; with its beating-the-odds theme and its dramatic finale involving a crucial at-bat in the World Series, it is reminiscent of a boyhood daydream."

Orlando Sentinel film critic Roger Moore concluded, "The kids will laugh and there's enough heart in Everyone's Hero to bring it over the plate -- barely."

MaryAnn Johanson at MTV News similarly spotlighted the "sweet gentleness" and "can-do-it-iveness" that made its otherwise typical children's film plot stand out.

Time Out London applauded the characters, especially Screwie, which recouped for its "lacking" amount of tension.

The visuals garnered a mixed response, Robinson calling the animation "bland" and "generic", and Leydon "herky-jerky". Lewis found Screwie and Darlin's visual gags "stale" but praised those of Lefty, reasoning that "his flailing limbs giving him a clumsy grace far more entertaining to watch than either the ball or the bat". Hunter acclaimed the animation as "quite advanced, bringing emotional subtleties, vivid eye dilations and expressions and complex movements to exceptional life", while Moore opined that "the animated people look plastic, but the backdrops are pretty, and the slapstick bits are a 'stitch'".

The voice acting was also praised.

== Syndication ==
In the United States, FX aired Everyone's Hero on July 12, 2009. Telemundo aired the film in the US on October 4, 2009. In Latin America, Cartoon Network Latino aired the film on November 23, 2011. In Asia, Disney Channel premiered the film on May 29, 2012. In the United States, FXM aired the film on June 16, 2012. It also aired on Disney XD in the United States on April 8, 2013, and on March 30, 2014. It also aired on Cartoon Network in the United States on November 5, 2016.

On its launch in May 2020, the movie was available to stream on HBO Max as part of a longtime distribution deal that the HBO network had made with Fox; the deal was still enacted after the acquisition of 21st Century Fox by Disney, which had its own streaming service, Disney+. However, on May 7, 2021, the film moved from HBO Max to Disney+, although it was removed from the latter service in September 2021 in the United States.

== Soundtrack ==
Everyone's Hero: Music from the Motion Picture

Soundtrack album by Various Artists
- Released: 2006
- Genre: Film soundtrack
- Length: 38:28
- Labels: Columbia; Sony Music Soundtrax

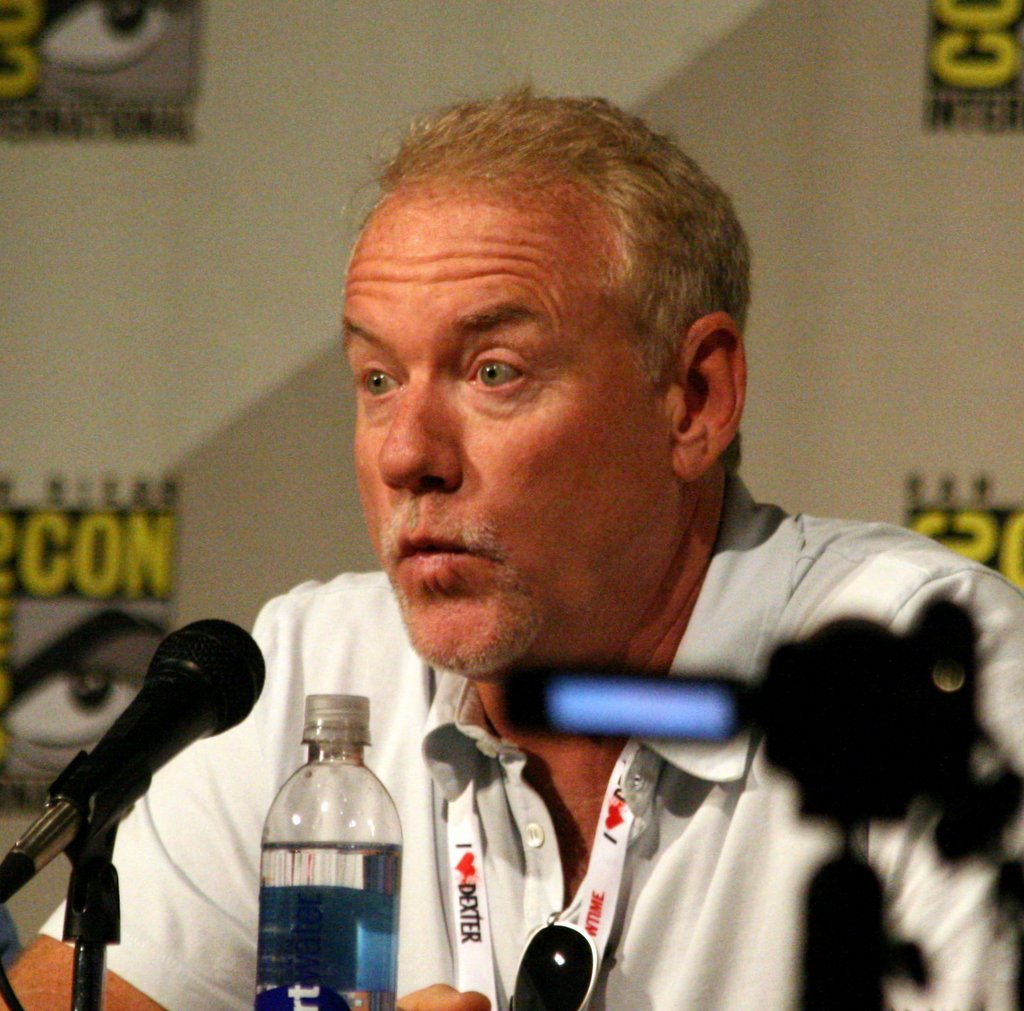
John Debney composed the film's score.

The soundtrack, released on the Columbia Records and Sony Music Soundtrax labels, features tracks by the star of the film Raven-Symoné, Grammy-winners Wyclef Jean, Brooks & Dunn, Mary Chapin Carpenter and various other artists.

No.	Title	Performer(s)	Length
1.	"The Best"	John Ondrasik	3:49
2.	"Keep On Swinging"	Brooks & Dunn	4:12
3.	"Dream Like New York"	Tyrone Wells	3:44
4.	"Chicago (That Toddling Town)"	Chris Botti featuring Lyle Lovett	2:16
5.	"The Best Day of My Life"	Jon Randall featuring Jessi Alexander	3:13
6.	"Keep Your Eye on the Ball"	Raven-Symoné	2:27
7.	"What You Do"	Wyclef Jean	3:12
8.	"Swing It"	Brooks & Dunn	3:34
9.	"Take Me Out to the Ballgame"	Lonestar	2:43
10.	"The Bug"	Mary Chapin Carpenter	3:48
11.	"The Tigers"	John Debney featuring Paris Bennett	1:46
12.	"At Bat"	Debney	3:44
Total length:			38:28

== See also ==
- List of animated feature films
- List of baseball films
- List of computer-animated films
