= Weill Cornell Graduate School of Medical Sciences =

Graduate college for biomedical sciences located in New York City

Coordinates: 40°45′52.38″N 73°57′14.93″W

- Type: Private
- Established: 1952
- Dean: Barbara L. Hempstead
- Faculty: More than 330
- Students: More than 400
- Location: New York City, New York, United States
- Website: gradschool.weill.cornell.edu

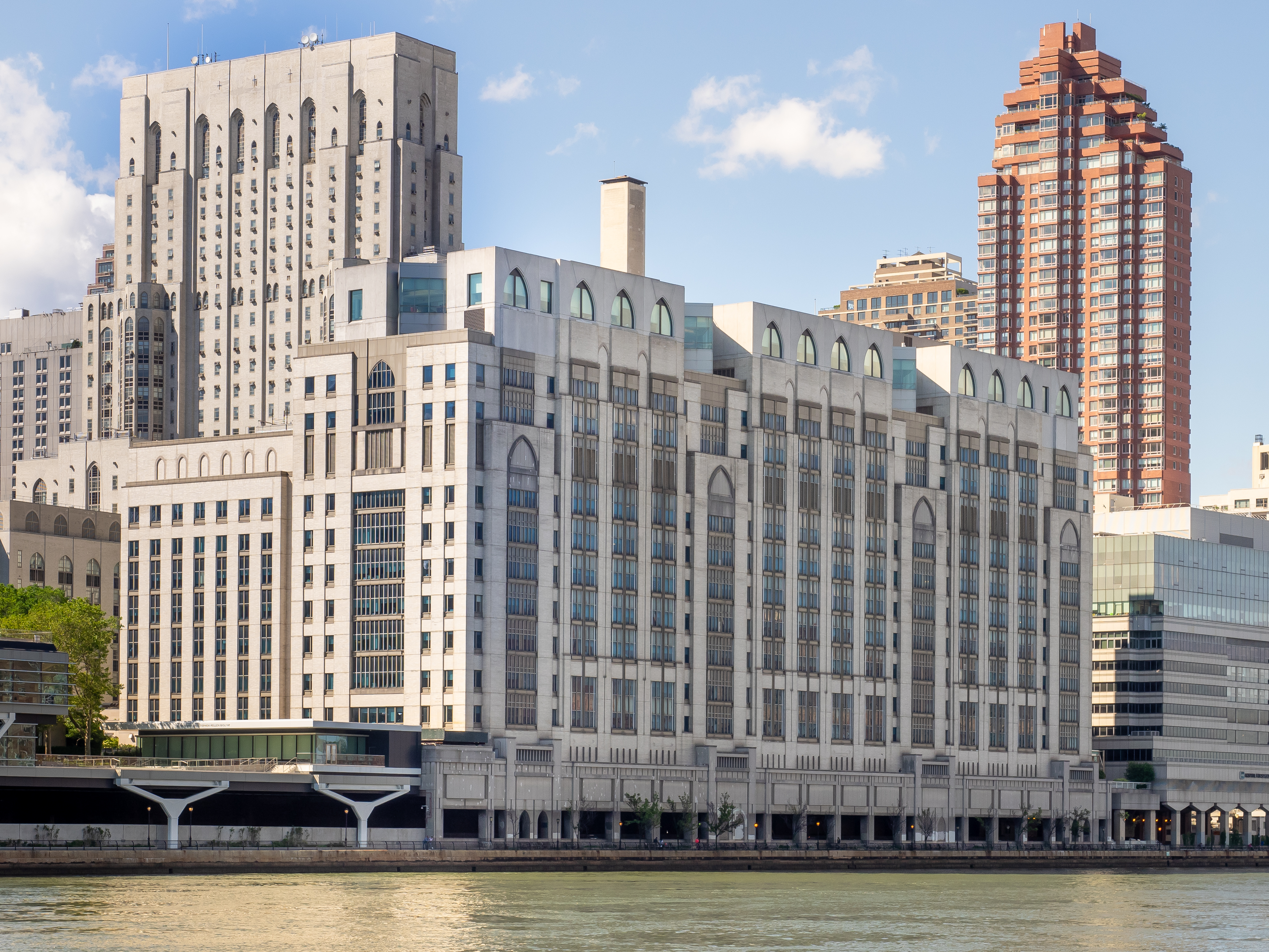
Weill Medical Center

The Weill Cornell Graduate School of Medical Sciences (WCGS; originally the Cornell University Graduate School of Medical Sciences) is the graduate school for biomedical science of Cornell University, located in Manhattan, New York City.

== Programs of study ==
The Weill Cornell Graduate School of Medical Sciences (WCGS) partners with neighboring institutions along York Avenue, also known as the "corridor of science" in New York City. Such partnerships with Memorial Sloan Kettering Cancer Center, New York-Presbyterian Hospital, the Hospital for Special Surgery, and The Rockefeller University offer specialized learning opportunities.

The school offers a variety of programs at both the Masters and Doctoral levels. As a partnership between the Sloan Kettering Institute and Weill Cornell Medical College, WCGS offers seven PhD programs as well as four distinct Masters programs. Additionally, the school offers two Tri-Institutional PhDs, a Tri-Institutional MD/PhD and the opportunity for students to participate in an Accelerated PhD/MBA program.

PhD Programs:

- Biochemistry and Structural Biology
- Molecular Biology
- Cell and Developmental Biology
- Immunology and Microbial Pathogenesis
- Pharmacology
- Neuroscience
- Physiology Biophysics and Systems Biology

Tri-Institutional PhD Programs

- Chemical Biology
- Computational Biology and Medicine
- Tri-I MD / PhD Program

== See also ==
- Tri-Institutional MD-PhD Program
- Weill Cornell Medical College
