= F. D. Reeve =

American poet

- Born: September 18, 1928; Philadelphia, Pennsylvania, U.S.
- Died: June 28, 2013 (aged 84); Lebanon, New Hampshire, U.S.
- Education: Princeton University (BA); Columbia University (PhD)
- Occupations: Writer; poet; academic
- Spouses: Barbara Lamb (m. 1951; div. 1956); Helen Schmidinger (divorced); Ellen Swift (m. 1983, divorced); Laura C. Stevenson
- Children: 5, including Christopher
- Relatives: Franklin D'Olier (grandfather); Matthew Reeve (grandson); Alexandra Reeve Givens (granddaughter); Will Reeve (grandson); Dana Morosini (daughter-in-law)
- Awards: See Awards

Franklin D'Olier Reeve (September 18, 1928 – June 28, 2013) was an American academic, writer, poet, Russian translator, and editor. He was the grandson of the first American Legion national commander, Franklin D'Olier, and the father of Superman actor Christopher Reeve.

== Life and career ==
Reeve was born in Philadelphia, the son of Anne Conrad D'Olier and Richard Henry Reeve. He was brought up outside New York City. Reeve worked in the Dakota wheat fields for a while during college and, after graduation, was a Hudson River longshoreman for a while. He graduated from Princeton University (1950) and Columbia University (1958), and in 1961 was one of the first exchanges between the American Council of Learned Societies and the USSR Academy of Sciences. In the late summer of 1962 he accompanied Robert Frost to Russia for his meeting with Nikita Khrushchev, where Reeve served as Frost's translator.

Reeve started his academic career teaching Russian language and literature at Columbia University. After teaching at Columbia, Reeve moved to Wesleyan University in 1962 as chairman of the Russian Department. In 1967, he joined Wesleyan's inter-disciplinary College of Letters where he taught literature, humanities and creative writing until his retirement in 2002. During the course of his career he had visiting appointments at Oxford University, Yale, and Columbia.

From 1994 on, he lived in Wilmington, Vermont with his wife, novelist Laura C. Stevenson. Reeve was an officer of the Poetry Society of America, the founding editor of Poetry Review, the secretary of Poets House in its formative years, and was associated with the New England Poetry Club and the New York Quarterly. He published over two dozen books of poetry, fiction, criticism, and translation.

Reeve died on June 28, 2013, at Dartmouth Hitchcock Hospital in Lebanon, New Hampshire from complications from diabetes.

== Awards ==
- New England Poetry Club's Golden Rose Award
- Award in literature from the American Academy of Arts and Letters
- Lit.D. from New England College

== Works ==
- Venus, Half Dressed
- The Old World
- Barnyard
- Coasting
- The auctioneer

=== Poetry ===
- In the Silent Stones
- The Blue Cat
- Nightway
- Concrete Music
- The Moon and Other Failures
- The Urban Stampede and Other Poems
- A World You Haven't Seen: Selected Poems
- The Return of the Blue Cat
- The Toy Soldier
- The Blue Cat Walks the Earth
- The Blue Cat Walks the Earth
- The Puzzle Master

=== Fiction ===
- Nathaniel Purple
- North River: short stories
- My Sister Life
- A Few Rounds of Old Maid
- White Colors
- The Brother
- Just Over The Border
- The Red Machines

=== Criticism ===
- The White Monk: An Essay on Dostoevsky and Melville
- The Russian Novel
- Robert Frost in Russia
- Aleksandr Blok: Between Image and Idea

=== Translations ===
- The Garden, New and Selected Poetry and Prose by Bella Akhmadulina
- Contemporary Russian Drama
- Anthology of Russian Plays, volume 2, 1890-1960
- Anthology of Russian Plays, volume 1, 1790-1890
- Resurrection (Revision and edit of Leo Wiener translation.)

=== Oratorio ===
- "The Urban Stampede", with music by Andrew Gant, Barbican Centre, London, 2000
