= Dana Reeve =

American actress and singer (1961–2006)

- Reeve in 1999
- Born: Dana Charles Morosini; March 17, 1961; Teaneck, New Jersey, U.S.
- Died: March 6, 2006 (aged 44); New York City, U.S.
- Education: Middlebury College (BA); California Institute of the Arts
- Occupations: Actress; singer; activist
- Years active: 1983–2006
- Spouse: Christopher Reeve (m. 1992; died 2004)
- Children: Will Reeve
- Relatives: F. D. Reeve (father-in-law)
- Website: www.christopherreeve.org

Dana Charles Reeve (née Morosini; March 17, 1961 – March 6, 2006) was an American actress and singer. She was the wife of actor Christopher Reeve and mother of television reporter and anchor Will Reeve.

== Early life ==
Dana Morosini was born in Teaneck, New Jersey, to Charles Morosini (died 2018), a cardiologist, and Helen Simpson Morosini (died 2005). She was of Italian descent.

Morosini grew up in the town of Greenburgh, New York, where she graduated from Edgemont High School in 1979.

Morosini graduated summa cum laude and Phi Beta Kappa in English Literature from Middlebury College in Vermont in 1984. In 2004 she and husband Christopher Reeve received honorary Doctorates of Humane Letters from Middlebury.

Morosini spent the junior year of her studies at the Royal Academy of Dramatic Art in London. In 1984, she pursued an MFA in acting from the California Institute of the Arts in Valencia, California.

== Career ==
Her many singing and acting credits included appearances on television, where she had guest roles on Dick Wolf's Law & Order, Law & Order: Criminal Intent, soap operas All My Children as Eva Stroupe and Loving, among others. She performed at theatres on Broadway, off-Broadway, and at numerous regional theatres.

In 2000, she co-hosted a live daily talk show for women on the Lifetime Network with Deborah Roberts called Lifetime Live and also wrote a brief column for the defunct AccessLife.com. These articles can be found at the Christopher Reeve Homepage. She sang the title song on the soundtrack of the HBO drama In the Gloaming, directed by her husband. Reeve also had another cameo in her husband's movie The Brooke Ellison Story as a teacher.

She authored the book Care Packages: Letters to Christopher Reeve from Strangers and Other Friends. In 2004, she was performing in the Broadway-bound play Brooklyn Boy at South Coast Repertory in Costa Mesa, California, when she had to rush home to reach her husband's bedside after he went into cardiac arrest and a coma. In April 2005, it was also announced that she signed a seven-figure book deal with Penguin Books to write about her relationship with her famous husband. It is not known how far Reeve got with writing the book before she died; the book was never published.

The children's book Dewey Doo-it Helps Owlie Fly Again: A Musical Storybook Inspired by Christopher Reeve was published in 2005 and included an audio to accompany the book with Mandy Patinkin reading the story as well as Reeve and Bernadette Peters singing.

On February 2, 2005, eight days before the death of her mother Helen, Reeve attended President George W. Bush's State of the Union address and seated in the Capitol gallery in Washington, D.C., as the guest of Congressman Jim Langevin (D–RI).

Several months before her death, Reeve taped the PBS documentary The New Medicine focusing on the growing trend in medical care combining holistic and traditional treatment. The program premiered after her death, on March 29, 2006. She also worked on the animated movie Everyone's Hero, a project with the working title Yankee Irving when her husband was the director at the time of his death. The film was released on September 15, 2006, and is dedicated to both her and Christopher Reeve.

== Personal life ==
Morosini married actor Christopher Reeve in Williamstown, Massachusetts, on April 11, 1992. Their son, William Elliot "Will" Reeve, was born two months later, on June 7, 1992. As of 2020, Will reports for ABC News.

Reeve was an avid horserider. In 2005, she told Larry King, "I rode my whole life, and after Chris had his accident, I stopped riding, primarily because he loved it so much, and I think it really would have been painful for him if I was going off riding and he wasn't able to. And it didn't mean that much to me to drop."

=== Illness and death ===
In August 2005, ten months after the death of her husband, Reeve announced that she had been diagnosed with lung cancer. She had never smoked cigarettes, a primary risk factor, but early in her career often sang in bars and hotel lobbies with exposure to secondhand smoke.

In 2005, Reeve received the "Mother of the Year Award" from the American Cancer Society for her dedication and determination in raising her son after the loss of her husband. In her final public appearances, Reeve stated that the tumor had responded to therapy and was shrinking. She appeared at Madison Square Garden on January 12, 2006, and sang the Carole King song "Now and Forever" in honor of New York Rangers hockey player Mark Messier, whose number was retired that evening.

Reeve died, aged 44, on March 6, 2006, at Memorial Sloan Kettering Cancer Center in New York City, 17 months after her husband. On the night that she died, instead of live performers singing the national anthem at Madison Square Garden prior to the Rangers' game, a recording of Reeve singing was played. She arranged for her orphaned 13-year-old son, Will, to live with their next-door neighbors so he could finish school instead of being forced to move in with relatives elsewhere.

== Legacy ==
On March 11, 2007, the Christopher Reeve Foundation, which Dana chaired after her husband Christopher Reeve died in October 2004, announced that it had changed its name to the Christopher & Dana Reeve Foundation on the first anniversary of her death.

Reeve and her husband were the namesake of the Christopher and Dana Reeve Paralysis Act signed by President Barack Obama in March 2009. The legislation coordinates research through the National Institutes of Health into paralysis and treatments to improve the quality of lives for those living with paralysis.

Episode 16 of the fifth season of Smallville titled "Hypnotic" is dedicated to her and the film Superman Returns is dedicated to both her and Christopher. The animated film Everyone's Hero (2006) is also dedicated in memory of Christopher and Dana Reeve.

== Filmography ==
Year	Title	Role	Notes
1983	Loving		
1990	Steel Magnolias (TV Movie)	Elise	(listed as Dana Morosini)
1995	Above Suspicion	Female Detective	
1997	Law and Order: Barter	Mrs. Taschian	
2000	Oz	Wendy Schultz	
2003	Freedom: A History of US	various roles	PBS documentary (voice acting)
2004	The Brooke Ellison Story	English Professor	Television film
2006	Everyone's Hero	Emily Irving	Posthumous (voice acting)
2024	Super/Man: The Christopher Reeve Story	self	Archival footage; posthumous
