= Christopher & Dana Reeve Foundation =

Charitable organization

Christopher and Dana Reeve Foundation
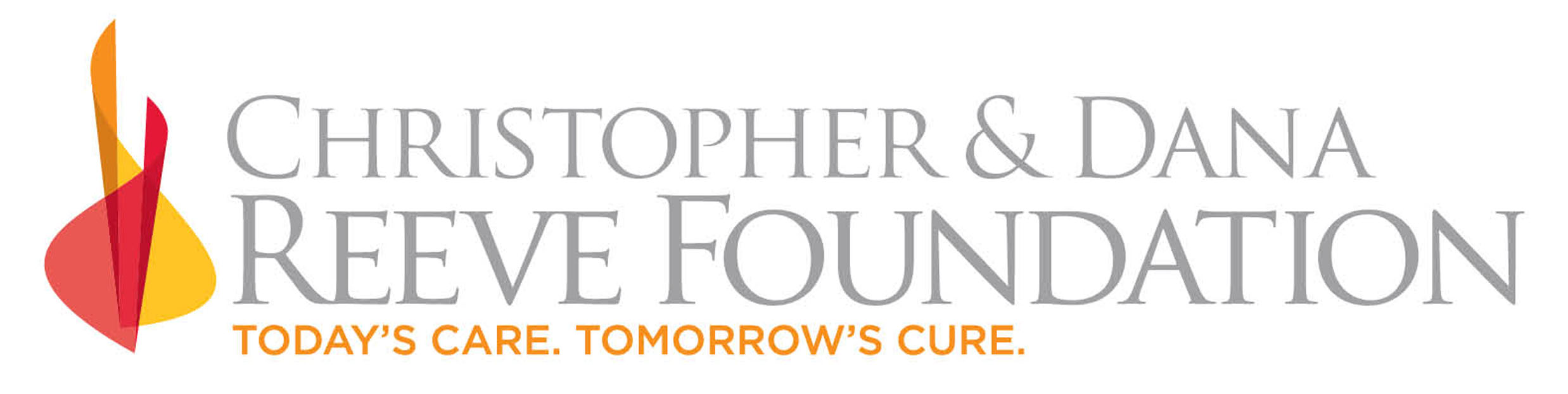
- Logo as of 2024
- Founded: 1982
- Location: Short Hills, New Jersey, U.S.
- Key people: Maggie Goldberg (President and CEO); Denise Andersen (Chief Development Officer); Marco Baptista (Chief Scientific Officer)
- Website: christopherreeve.org

The Christopher & Dana Reeve Foundation is a charitable organization headquartered in Short Hills, New Jersey, dedicated to finding treatments and cures for paralysis caused by spinal cord injury and other neurological disorders.

The organization's mission statement states: "We are dedicated to curing spinal cord injury by advancing innovative research and improving quality of life for individuals and families impacted by paralysis." As of 2024, it has distributed over $140 million to spinal cord researchers, and $46 million to nonprofits that aim to support better quality-of-life for people with disabilities.

== History ==
The foundation was started in 1982 by Hank Stifel, whose son Henry had been injured in a motor vehicle accident. Its original name was the Stifel Paralysis Research Foundation. In the mid-1980s, Stifel approached the American Paralysis Association (APA) about a merger under the APA banner. In 1995, actor Christopher Reeve became quadriplegic as a result of a horse riding accident. Reeve reached out to the APA and raised funds for it. He joined the board of directors and was elected chairman. In 1996, Reeve established the Christopher Reeve Foundation (CRF). In 1999, CRF and APA merged into the Christopher Reeve Paralysis Foundation. Later, the word "paralysis" was dropped from its name and the organization was called the Christopher Reeve Foundation.

After Reeve's death in October 2004, his widow, Dana Reeve, assumed the chairmanship of the Foundation. She died 17 months later, in March 2006, of lung cancer.

On March 11, 2007, the Foundation announced that it had changed its name to the Christopher & Dana Reeve Foundation on the first anniversary of Dana Reeve's death. As of 2025, all three of Christopher Reeve's children serve on the foundation's board of directors. They are television reporter and anchor Will Reeve, film producer and director Matthew Reeve, and lawyer Alexandra Reeve Givens.

== See also ==
- Spinal cord injury research
- Rehabilitation in spinal cord injury
