= Brooke Ellison =

American politician (1978–2024)

- Born: Brooke Mackenzie Ellison; October 20, 1978; Long Island, New York, U.S.
- Died: February 4, 2024 (aged 45); Stony Brook, New York, U.S.
- Education: Harvard University (BS, MPP); Stony Brook University (PhD)
- Political party: Democratic
- Website: Official website

Brooke Mackenzie Ellison (October 20, 1978 – February 4, 2024) was an American academic, disability advocate, and the first person with quadriplegia to graduate from Harvard University.

== Life and career ==
Ellison was born in Rockville Centre, New York, on October 20, 1978, to Edward and Jean (née Derenze) Ellison. She had an older sister, Kysten, and a younger brother, Reed. On September 4, 1990, at age 11, she was hit by a car while walking home from school, resulting in paralysis from the neck down. Her father worked for the Social Security Administration as a manager, while her mother began working as a special education teacher on her first and only day at the time of the accident. Although her injuries left her completely dependent on other people, she graduated from Ward Melville High School in 1996 with high honors, and was accepted to Harvard. She graduated magna cum laude from Harvard with a bachelor of science in cognitive neuroscience in 2000 and a master's degree in public policy from Harvard's Kennedy School of Government, making her the first quadriplegic to graduate from Harvard. In 2014, Rutgers University awarded Ellison an honorary doctorate in humane letters. She completed her Ph.D. in 2012 from Stony Brook University.

In 2002, Ellison's memoir Miracles Happen: One Mother, One Daughter, One Journey, which she co-wrote with her mother following her graduation from Harvard, was published.

=== The Brooke Ellison Story ===
The Brooke Ellison Story premiered in 2004, based on Ellison's 2002 memoir Miracles Happen: One Mother, One Daughter, One Journey. The television film was directed by Christopher Reeve, the star of Superman, who himself had quadriplegia. Ellison was portrayed by Vanessa Marano as a child and Lacey Chabert as a teenager, and Mary Elizabeth Mastrantonio portrayed Ellison's mother Jean. It is also notable for being Reeve's final directing project. The film aired on the A&E network on October 25, 2004.

=== Candidacy for State Senate ===
Ellison ran for New York State Senate as a Democrat in 2006 but was defeated by the Republican incumbent, John Flanagan. One of Ellison's principal issues was her support for embryonic stem cell research. She served on the advisory board of the Genetics Policy Institute.

=== Later life ===
Ellison was a professor in the School of Health Technology and Management at Stony Brook University and a motivational speaker.

In November 2015, Ellison teamed up with director James Siegel to create the award-winning documentary "Hope Deferred", which aims to educate the general public about embryonic stem cell research.

Ellison was an advocate for accessible technology. She served as Vice President of Tech Access for United Spinal Association beginning in January 2023 following her 2022 appointment to their board.

Two decades following the publication of Miracles Happen, Ellison wrote and published her second book, Look Both Ways in 2021.

Ellison died at Stony Brook University Hospital on February 4, 2024, at age 45, of complications from quadriplegia.

== Books ==
- Ellison, Brooke; Ellison, Jean (January 9, 2002). Miracles Happen: One Mother, One Daughter, One Journey. New York: Hyperion Press. ISBN 0-7868-6770-1.
- Ellison, Brooke (August 15, 2021). Look Both Ways. Adaptation Publishing. ISBN 978-1-7373389-1-8.
