= Fabrizio Michelassi =

Surgeon and surgical researcher

Fabrizio Michelassi, M.D., F.A.C.S. is the Lewis Atterbury Stimson Professor, and Chairman of the Department of Surgery at Weill Cornell Medicine and Surgeon-in-Chief at NewYork-Presbyterian/Weill Cornell Medical Center.

== Education ==
Michelassi received his M.D. from the University of Pisa School of Medicine, followed by a general surgery residency at New York University in New York.

== Career ==
After residency, Michelassi joined the University of Chicago as an assistant professor. He stayed at the University of Chicago for twenty years during which time he became the Thomas D. Jones Professor of Surgery, Chief of the Section of General Surgery and vice-chair of the Department of Surgery. In 2004, Michelassi was recruited by NewYork-Presbyterian/Weill Cornell Medical Center in New York City to become the Lewis Atterbury Stimson Professor, Chairman of the Department of Surgery and Surgeon-in-Chief at NewYork-Presbyterian/Weill Cornell Medical Center.

His main research focus is the surgical treatment of pancreatic and colorectal cancers, ulcerative colitis and Crohn's disease. Michelassi developed a novel bowel-sparing procedure, now known as the "Michelassi Strictureplasty", designed to avoid sacrificing large amounts of bowel during surgery. Strictureplasties are categorized into three groups: conventional, intermediate, and complex procedures. The Heineke-Mikulicz Strictureplasty is the most common among the conventional strictureplasties, the Finney Strictureplasty is the most common intermediate strictureplasty, and the most common complex strictureplasty is the Michelassi Strictureplasty.

== Awards and honors ==
Michelassi was honored as an Official of the Order of Merit of the Republic of Italy with the rank of Commendatore, In 2010, he received the "Campano d'Oro" medal from the University of Pisa, the highest honor that can be accorded to a University of Pisa alumnus. In 2012, he received the “Grand Award of Merit,” the most notable award of the American Society of the Italian Legions of Merit. In 2017, he was the recipient of the "Society of Surgical Oncology Distinguished Service Award," presented for outstanding contributions to surgical oncology through service to SSO, research, clinical care or health policy. In 2019, he was named an "Honorary Fellow of the Society of Black Academic Surgeons." In 2022, he was honored with the "SSAT Founders Medal," in recognition of his contributions to GI Surgery. In 2024, he received the "Rosenthal Humanitarian Award," from the Crohn's and Colitis Foundation-Greater New York Chapter.

Michelassi has been honored also by international surgical societies for his contribution to Surgery. He was awarded honorary membership in the Societa’ Italiana di Chirurgia (Italian Surgical Society) in 2018, in the European Surgical Association in 2019 and in the Deutsche Gesellschaft fur Chirurgie (German Society of Surgery) in 2024, in the Royal College of Surgeons of England and the Japanese Surgical Society in 2025.
