= Christopher E. Mason =

American geneticist

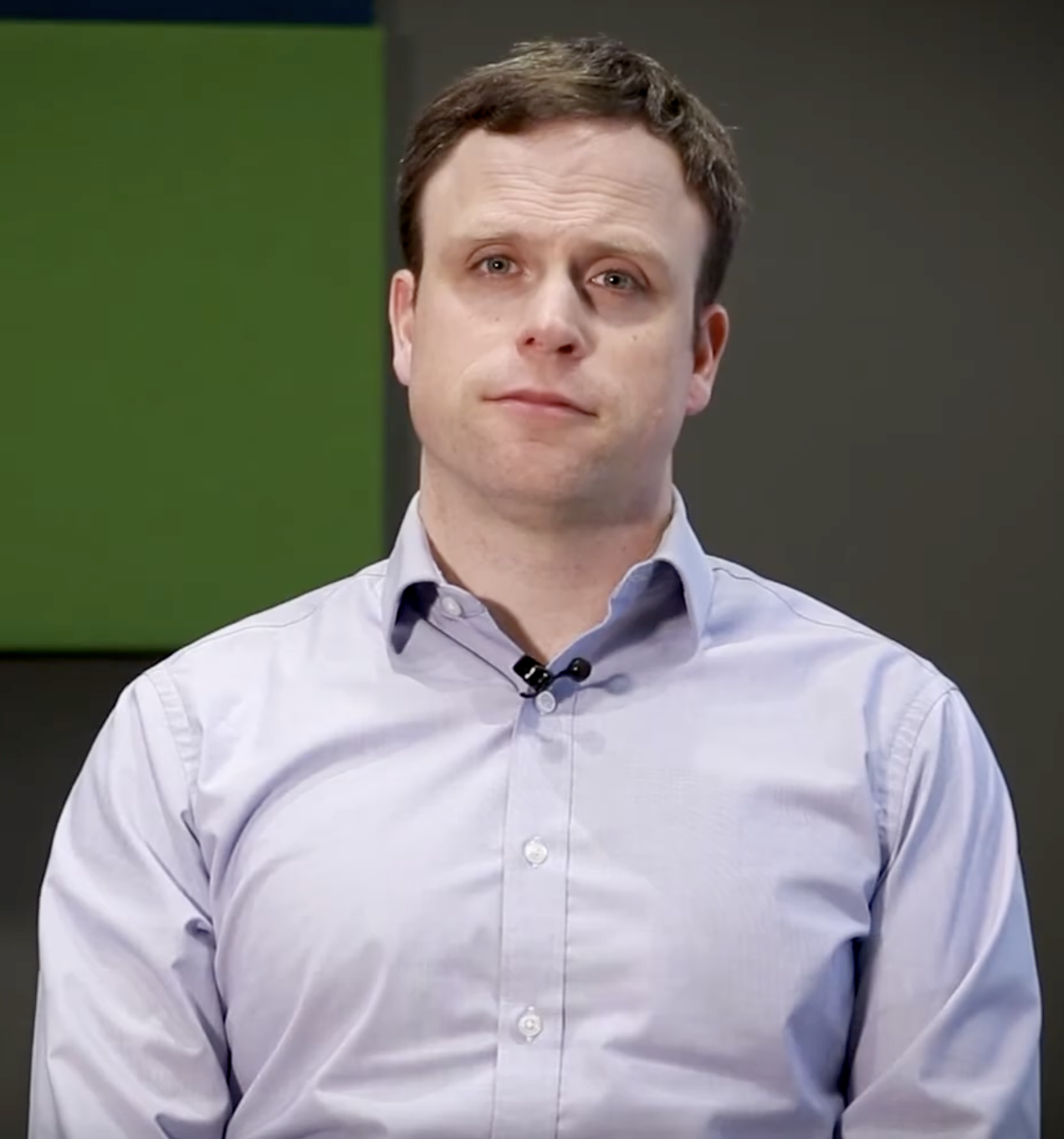
- April 2019
- Education: University of Wisconsin–Madison (BS), Yale University (PhD)
- Scientific career
- Fields: Biology
- Workplaces: Weill Cornell Medicine
- Doctoral students: Lenore Pipes
- Website: https://physiology.med.cornell.edu/people/christopher-mason-ph-d/

Christopher E. Mason is a professor of Genomics, Physiology, and Biophysics at Weill Cornell Medicine. He is also one of the founding Directors of the WorldQuant Initiative for Quantitative Prediction together with Olivier Elemento. Mason has co-founded four biotechnology startup companies including Onegevity Health, Biotia, BridgeOmics, and Nurture Genomics. He holds four patents related to his research.

== Education ==
Mason completed his dual BS in genetics and biochemistry from the University of Wisconsin–Madison in 2001. He did his PhD in genetics from Yale University in 2006. He completed a post-doctoral fellowship in clinical genetics at Yale Medical School, while also serving as a visiting fellow of genomics, ethics, and law at the Information Society Project at Yale Law School. Mason began work at Weill Cornell Medical College in 2009.

== Career ==
=== Human Spaceflight Research ===
Mason was a principal investigator for the NASA Twins Study. He also led the first demonstration of sequencing in zero gravity and designed the genomics and bioinformatics methods and experimental protocols that were used on the International Space Station (ISS) for the mission to sequence DNA in space for the first time. The results looks promising for Mars mission. This work also led to Mason's selection as the chair of the steering committee for the NASA GeneLab Data and Sample Archive (2018-2022) and has highlighted Weill Cornell Medicine on two NASA mission patches. Mason also was selected by the National Academy of Sciences for the Decadal Survey for NASA.

=== Microbe Research ===
In 2013, Mason launched the PathoMap project to create the first genetic map of a city. This study led to the establishment of the International MetaSUB Consortium. Mason's group additionally elucidated the underlying microbial mechanisms for the pink color of Lake Hillier.

=== Research Software ===
In addition to producing journal articles, Mason's laboratory has also released 12 open-source software packages in genomics, epigenomics, metagenomics, and machine learning (methylKit, r-make, MeRiPPeR, eDMR, methclone, mCaller, genomation, DISCO, UNFOG, CNVision, TWG Browser, Metagenscope).

== Bibliography ==
- Mason, Christopher E. (2021). The Next 500 Years: Engineering Life to Reach New Worlds. MIT Press. ISBN 9780262360067.
- Tulchinsky, Igor; Mason, Christopher E. (2023). The Age of Prediction: Algorithms, AI, and Shifting Shadows of Risk. MIT Press. ISBN 9780262047739.
