= Olivier Elemento =

French-American computational biologist

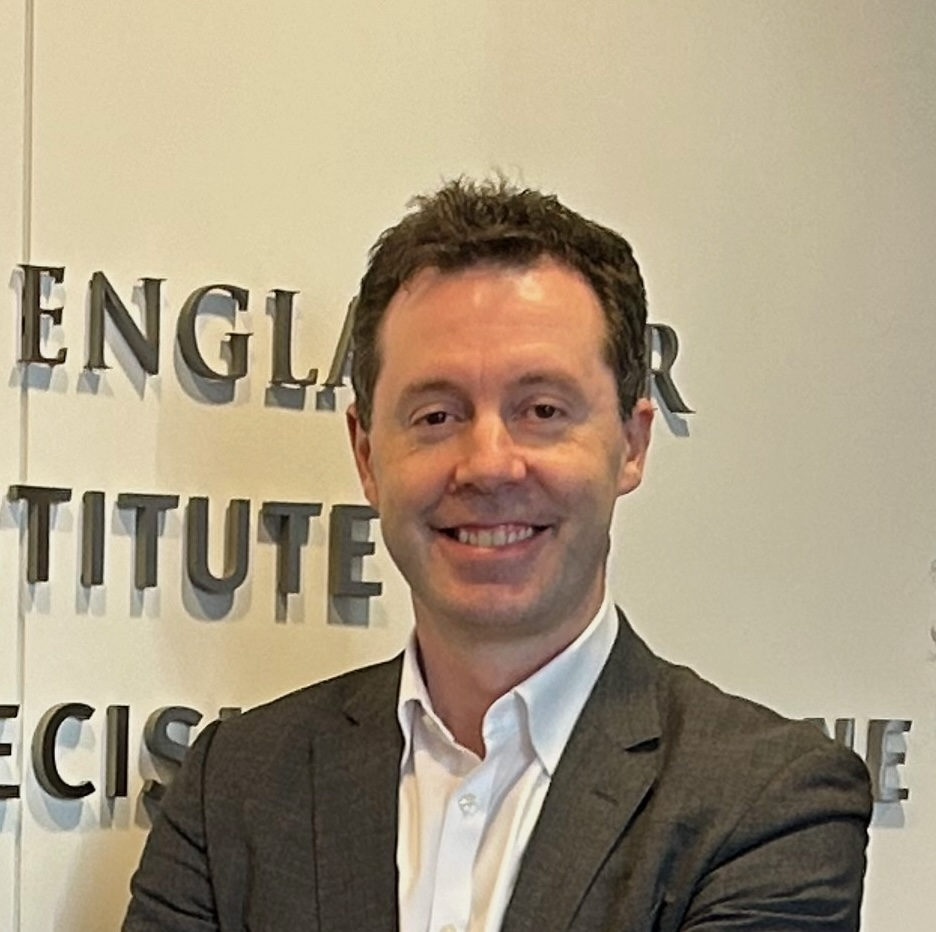
- Elemento in 2024
- Education: University Paul Sabatier (BS); INSA Toulouse (MS); University of Paris Dauphine (MS); University of Montpellier (PhD)
- Known for: AI applications in oncology; leadership of the Englander Institute for Precision Medicine
- Awards: NSF CAREER Award (2012); Walter B. Wriston Research Scholar (2016–2019); Clarivate Highly Cited Researcher (2019–2025)
- Scientific career
- Fields: Artificial intelligence; oncology; computational biology; genomics; precision medicine
- Workplaces: Weill Cornell Medicine

Olivier Elemento is a French-American computational biologist who directs the Caryl and Israel Englander Institute for Precision Medicine (EIPM) at Weill Cornell Medicine in New York City. As of June 2025 he has authored more than 500 peer-reviewed publications and is listed as a Clarivate Highly Cited Researcher. Elemento's work has been profiled in The New York Times Magazine, NPR, Wired, and other national outlets.

== Early life and education ==
Elemento earned a bachelor's degree in mechanical engineering from the Université Paul Sabatier in Toulouse. He obtained master's degrees from INSA Toulouse (mechanical engineering) and the University of Paris Dauphine (intelligent systems), then completed a doctorate in computational biology at the University of Montpellier/CNRS in 2003 under Olivier Gascuel and Marie-Paule Lefranc. He carried out post-doctoral research at Princeton University's Lewis-Sigler Institute for Integrative Genomics.

== Career ==
Elemento joined Weill Cornell Medicine in 2008 and became full professor of physiology and biophysics in 2019. In September 2017 he was appointed director of the Englander Institute for Precision Medicine, succeeding founding director Mark Rubin. He also serves as co-director of the WorldQuant Initiative for Quantitative Prediction alongside Christopher E. Mason.

In 2020 Elemento launched a hospital-wide whole-genome-sequencing (WGS) initiative with NewYork-Presbyterian Hospital and Illumina. Genetic Engineering & Biotechnology News described it as "the largest clinical WGS effort of its kind in the United States," and The New York Times Magazine featured the program in a major article about the transformative potential of genomic sequencing.

Elemento has served as a public voice on the adoption and responsible development of precision oncology and medical AI. In March 2018 Wired reported on Medicare's decision to reimburse genomic cancer testing and quoted Elemento on the mainstreaming of sequencing in care, and he later argued in a Wall Street Journal op-ed that regulation should not slow access to sequencing-based diagnostics. In 2025, he published an opinion piece in STAT News advocating for randomized controlled trials in medical AI implementation, arguing that Silicon Valley companies should be held to the same rigorous standards as traditional medical interventions.

In September 2022 Elemento and otolaryngologist Yaël Bensoussan became co-principal investigators of Voice as a Biomarker of Health, a National Institutes of Health Bridge2AI consortium. The Verge characterized the effort as "an attempt to turn the human voice into a new vital sign."

In 2024, Elemento co-chaired a workshop with Regina Barzilay convened by the National Cancer Institute, ARPA-H, and Department of Energy on "Using AI Approaches to Target Undruggable Cancer Targets," which brought together leading scientists to address one of oncology's most challenging problems. The insights from this workshop led to a published Nature Biotechnology commentary on redefining druggable targets with artificial intelligence.

Outside academia Elemento co-founded Volastra Therapeutics with Lewis C. Cantley and Samuel Bakhoum. Volastra is developing treatments targeting chromosomal instability in cancer, with two small molecules currently in Phase 1 clinical trials. The company raised $44 million in seed funding before securing an additional $60 million in Series A financing in 2023, along with a strategic partnership with Microsoft to leverage AI in addressing cancer metastasis.

Three of his doctoral students have been recognized on Forbes 30 Under 30: Tomer Yaron-Barir, Kaitlyn Gayvert, Neel Madhukar. Kaitlyn Gayvert and Neel Madhukar were named to the Healthcare list in 2016 for work completed in his lab. Tomer Yaron-Barir was recognized on Forbes "30 Under 30: Science" in 2024 for co-inventing the Kinase Library under the joint supervision of Elemento and Lewis C. Cantley.

== Research highlights ==
Elemento's laboratory combines high-throughput sequencing, single-cell technologies and machine learning.

- Artificial-intelligence approaches in oncology – Developed the machine-learning model PrOCTOR for predicting clinical-trial toxicity. He presented related work in the opening-plenary lecture at AACR Virtual Annual Meeting II (June 22, 2020).
- AI embryo assessment – Contributed to STORK, a computer-vision system (led by Iman Hajirasouliha) that outperformed embryologists at grading IVF embryos; the study was profiled in Wired.
- Spatial-omics of disease – Led development of UTAG, an unsupervised algorithm for tissue-architecture mapping. He also co-led a Nature atlas of COVID-19 lung pathology. In 2025, amfAR INNOVATIONS interviewed Elemento about applying these AI and spatial-omics methods to HIV research.

== Leadership and advisory roles ==
- Board of Scientific Counselors, National Cancer Institute.
- Executive Committee member, International Cancer Genome Consortium ARGO (Accelerating Research in Genomic Oncology).
- Co-investigator, SAMBAI (Societal, Ancestry, Molecular and Biological Analyses of Inequalities) Cancer Grand Challenge.
- Scientific Review Council member, Pershing Square Sohn Cancer Research Alliance.
- Board member, Advancium Health Network.
- Scientific Advisory Board member, Owkin.
- Scientific Advisory Board member, Harmonic Discovery.
- Scientific Advisory Board member, Pannex Therapeutics.

== Awards and honours ==
- NSF CAREER Award (2012).
- Walter B. Wriston Research Scholar, Weill Cornell Medicine (2016–2019).
- Clarivate Highly Cited Researcher (2019–2025).

== Selected publications ==
- Elemento O.; Khozin S.; Sternberg C.N. (2025). "The Use of Artificial Intelligence for Cancer Therapeutic Decision-Making." NEJM AI. doi:10.1056/AIra2401164.
- Akinsanya K.; AlQuraishi M.; Boija A.; et al. (2025). "Redefining druggable targets with artificial intelligence." Nature Biotechnology. doi:10.1038/s41587-025-02770-1.
- Bhinder B.; Gilvary C.; Madhukar N.S.; Elemento O. (2021). "Artificial Intelligence in Cancer Research and Precision Medicine." Cancer Discovery 11: 900–915. doi:10.1158/2159-8290.CD-21-0090.
- Rendeiro A.F.; Ravichandran H.; Bram Y.; Chandar V.; Kim J.; Meydan C.; Park J.; Foox J.; Hether T.; Warren S.; Kim Y.; Reeves J.; Salvatore S.; Mason C.E.; Swanson E.C.; Borczuk A.C.; Elemento O.; Schwartz R.E. (2021). "The spatial landscape of lung pathology during COVID-19 progression." Nature 593: 564–569. doi:10.1038/s41586-021-03475-6.
- Gayvert K.; Madhukar N.S.; Elemento O. (2016). "A data-driven approach to predicting successes and failures of clinical trials." Cell Chemical Biology 23 (10): 1294–1301. doi:10.1016/j.chembiol.2016.07.023.

== Personal life ==
Elemento was born and raised in France and holds dual French-American citizenship.
