= Reuben Shaw =

American cancer scientist

- Education: Cornell University (BS, Biology) Massachusetts Institute of Technology (PhD)
- Awards: Clarivate Top Cited Researcher (2019, 2020, 2021, 2022) NCI Outstanding Investigator Award (2017) Howard Hughes Medical Institute Early Career Scientist (2009)
- Scientific career
- Fields: Cancer Cell biology Metabolism
- Academic advisors: Tyler Jacks (MIT) and Lewis C. Cantley (Harvard)

Reuben Shaw is an American cancer researcher. He is a professor and director of the National Cancer Institute-Designated Cancer Center at the Salk Institute for Biological Studies, one of the NCI's seven basic laboratory cancer centers in the United States. He researches signaling pathways that control tumor metabolism, with a specific focus on an ancient energy-sensing pathway that controls biological response to starvation.

== Education ==
Reuben Shaw grew up in New York state, where he later earned a degree in biology from Cornell University. Shaw then earned his Ph.D. in cancer biology at Massachusetts Institute of Technology with advisor Tyler Jacks. He completed his postdoctoral fellowship at Harvard Medical School with advisor Lewis C. Cantley.

== Career and research ==
In 2004, Reuben Shaw discovered a link between primitive energy-sensing AMP-activated protein kinase and tumor suppressing Lkb1. In 2005, his lab showed that the type 2 diabetes drug Metformin operates by targeting both Lkb1 and AMP-activated protein kinase. Since then, he has researched AMPK, its downstream targets, and how its molecular pathway functions in relation to diabetes and cancer.

Shaw joined the Salk Institute for Biological Studies as an assistant professor in 2006. He became a professor at Salk in 2014 and currently holds the William R. Brody Chair. He is also currently an adjunct professor in molecular biology at University of California, San Diego.

Shaw has made a variety of discoveries related to the AMPK pathway:

- The enzyme AMPK senses when nutrients and energy levels are low, then consequently limits cell growth and reprograms metabolism to withstand such deficits.
- The AMPK pathway is related to LKB1 and altered in non-small-cell lung cancer.
- A non-small-cell lung cancer altered AMPK pathway can be reinitiated by treatment with the type 2 diabetes medication Metformin.

Shaw uses a combination of genetic engineering in mice and interdisciplinary studies across cancer, diabetes, neurodegenerative disease, and aging. His research contributes to the development of therapeutic solutions to cancers and metabolic diseases, such as the pivot of Metformin to potentially treat cancers and the identification of LKB1 as a target for non-small-cell lung cancer treatments.

== Awards and honors ==
- Clarivate Top Cited Researcher, 2019, 2020, 2021, 2022, 2024, 2025
- Member of Lustgarten Advancing Breakthrough Science Program, 2022
- Mark Foundation for Cancer Research Endeavor Award, 2022
- Curebound Discovery Grant, 2022, and member of Scientific Advisory Board
- NCI Outstanding Investigator Award, 2017
- Howard Hughes Medical Institute Early Career Scientist, 2009
- The V Foundation for Cancer Research Scholar Award, 2006
