= Jonathan Avery =

American psychiatrist and academic

- Occupations: Psychiatrist, academic

Academic background
- Education: New York University School of Medicine

Academic work
- Discipline: Addiction medicine Addiction psychiatry
- Institutions: Weill Cornell Medical College; NewYork-Presbyterian Hospital

Jonathan Avery is an American addiction psychiatrist and academic based at Weill Cornell Medical College. At Weill Cornell, he serves as Vice Chair for Addiction Psychiatry and holds the endowed Stephen P. Tobin and Dr. Arnold M. Cooper Professorship in Consultation Liaison Psychiatry. Avery hosts the podcast Thriving with Addiction and is the author of Thriving with Addiction: A New Roadmap for Lasting Recovery and Health. He is also the medical director of the NBA/NBPA Anti-Drug Program.

== Early life and education ==
Avery was born in the United States. His father was a hospice physician.

Jonathan Avery earned his M.D. from New York University School of Medicine in 2009, followed by a psychiatry residency at NewYork-Presbyterian Hospital / Payne Whitney Clinic, where he was co-chief resident. He later completed a specialization in addiction psychiatry at NYU School of Medicine.

== Medical career ==
After fellowship, Avery joined the faculty at Weill Cornell Medical College and NewYork-Presbyterian Hospital. He is now Program Director for the Addiction Psychiatry Fellowship and Vice Chair for Addiction Psychiatry in the Department of Psychiatry.

He founded the Weill Cornell / New York-Presbyterian Program for Substance Use and Stigma of Addiction. The program was launched in 2019 and focuses on reducing stigma in medical settings, as well as improving intervention strategies. Since 2023, he has been the medical director of the NBA/NBPA Anti-Drug Program. In 2026, Avery launched Thriving with Addiction, a podcast featuring conversations about addiction, recovery, and mental health. He is also the author of Thriving with Addiction: A New Roadmap for Lasting Recovery and Health (2026), a book for a general audience about addiction treatment and long-term recovery.

== Research and advocacy ==
Avery's research topics include clinician attitudes toward patients with substance use disorders, adoption of buprenorphine, and stigma-reduction interventions for health care professionals and trainees. He has authored or edited texts such as Co-occurring Mental Illness and Substance Use Disorders: A Guide to Diagnosis and Treatment and The Stigma of Addiction: An Essential Guide.

== Selected publications ==
Selected publications by Avery include the following.

- Avery, Jonathan (2026). Thriving with Addiction. Prometheus. ISBN 9781493096756.
- Baig Z, Appel G, Verzani Z, Abramson E, Safdieh JE, Kang Y, Avery J (May 2024). "Beyond Labels". The Primary Care Companion for CNS Disorders. 26 (3). doi:10.4088/PCC.23lr03693. PMID 38815267.
- Balmuth EA, Iyer S, Scales DA, Avery J (August 2024). "Perspectives and Recommendations from Hospitalized Patients with Substance Use Disorders: A Qualitative Study". Journal of General Internal Medicine. 39 (11): 2087–2096. doi:10.1007/s11606-024-08745-3. PMC 11306722. PMID 38698295.
- Woods M, Appel G, Daulbayeva A, Harris C, Picard R, Iyasere J, Avery J (February 2024). "Integrating Technology into Undergraduate Medical Education: Can Affective Computing Help Teach Empathy?". Academic Psychiatry. 48 (1): 110–111. doi:10.1007/s40596-023-01900-8. PMC 12013501. PMID 37957428.
- Avery J (December 2022). "Naltrexone and Alcohol Use". American Journal of Psychiatry. 179 (12): 886–887. doi:10.1176/appi.ajp.20220821. PMID 36453035.
- Fruitman K, Knight RN, Avery J (2022). "Virtual Engagement With Peer Recovery Specialists for Patients With Substance Use Disorders Hospitalized During the COVID-19 Pandemic: A Case Report". Journal of the Academy of Consultation-Liaison Psychiatry. 63 (3): 292–293. doi:10.1016/j.jaclp.2022.01.001. PMC 8755552. PMID 35033730.
- Sundaresh S, Appel G, Ho K, Card A, Avery JJ, Avery JD (October 2021). "Demonstrating the Efficacy of Incorporating Peers Into Addiction Training for Internal Medicine Residents". The Primary Care Companion for CNS Disorders. 23 (5). doi:10.4088/PCC.20m02875. PMID 34619811.
