= Douglas Scherr =

American surgeon

Douglas S. Scherr (born January 7, 1967) is an American surgeon and specialist in Urologic Oncology. He is currently the Clinical Director of Urologic Oncology at NewYork-Presbyterian / Weill Cornell Medicine. He also holds an appointment at the Rockefeller University as a Visiting Associate Physician. Scherr was the first physician at Cornell to perform a robotic prostatectomy as well as a robotic cystectomy.

== Background ==
A native of New York, Scherr studied at Cornell University and received an undergraduate degree in government. Scherr spent a year abroad in Shenyang, China, after which he attended medical school at the George Washington University School of MedicineWashington, D.C. Subsequently, he completed a 6-year residency in Urology at the New York-Presbyterian Hospital and a Fellowship in Urologic Oncology at Memorial Sloan Kettering Cancer Center for two years. He is married to Jennifer Scherr and they have three children.

== Areas of focus ==
Scherr specializes in treating urologic malignancies. His focus is on the treatment of prostate cancer, bladder cancer, kidney cancer, testicular cancer, and genitourinary and retroperitoneal sarcomas. He performs robotic assisted removal of bladders with total bladder reconstructions, along with colleague Shahrokh Shariat.

He sits on several advisory boards in companies involved in urologic technology development. He has been influential in the ergonomics of robotic technology. He has been active in the development of optical coherence tomography and its application to urologic imaging.

Also active in the Laboratory of Urologic Oncology, Scherr has been instrumental in defining the hormonal regulation of bladder cancer and is currently developing a novel class of compounds that utilize the innate immune system to fight urologic tumors. He is working on the development of a non-invasive means to assess human tissue at the microscopic level. To this end, he has patented and developed the concept of “multiphoton endoscopy” which utilizes high speed laser energy to create high quality microscopic images of human tissue. This breakthrough has vast applications in cystoscopy, colonoscopy and bronchoscopy.

== Honors and awards ==
- William Beaumont Medical Research Honor Society First Prize for Best Original Medical Essay, The William Shafirt Award, The George Washington University School of Medicine. “A crisis of unknown proportion: An empirical analysis of the American medical malpractice system.” 1994
- First Prize for Clinical Investigation, Ferdinand C. Valentine Urology Residents Essay Meeting, “BCL-2 and P53 expression in clinically localized prostate cancer as predictive markers for the response to external beam radiotherapy.” 1998
- First Prize for Clinical Investigation, Society of University Urology Residents, Annual Chief Resident Meeting, Marietta, Georgia. “Anti-androgen therapy for prostate cancer and the prevention of osteoporosis: The role of DES.” 2000
- Second Prize for Clinical Investigation, Ferdinand C. Valentine Urology Residents Essay Meeting, “Collagen Type I Crosslinked N-Telopeptide as a urinary marker for osteoporosis in prostate cancer: The role of Diethylstilbesterol (DES).” 2000
- Pfizer, Scholars in Urology Award, Awarded for advancing the scientific and clinical field of urology. 2000
- Ferdinand C. Valentine Fellowship for Research in Urology. The New York Academy of Medicine. 2001–2002. Syndecan-1 expression in prostate cancer and the role of p27 in primary prostate epithelial cell transformation.
- T32 Research Training Grant Memorial Sloan Kettering Cancer Center. 2000–2002.
- Edwin Beer Research Award NY Academy of Medicine. Effective Tumor Immunotherapy in Transitional Cell Carcinoma of the Bladder. 2005-2007
- Career Development Award Kidney Urology Foundation of America. The role of the Pim-1 Oncoprotein in Prostate Carcinogenesis. 2004-2005
- Best Video Award Society of Laparoscopic Surgery. Oncological Outcomes of Robotic Cystectomy. San Francisco, CA August, 2007.

== Publications ==
- Raman, JD; Sosa, RE; Vaughan Ed, Jr; Scherr, DS (2007). "Pathologic features of bladder tumors after nephroureterectomy or segmental ureterectomy for upper urinary tract transitional cell carcinoma". Urology. 69 (2): 251–4. doi:10.1016/j.urology.2006.09.065. PMID 17320658.
- Smith, EB; Schwartz, M; Kawamoto, H; You, X; Hwang, D; Liu, H; Scherr, DS (2007). "Antitumor effects of imidazoquinolines in urothelial cell carcinoma of the bladder". The Journal of Urology. 177 (6): 2347–51. doi:10.1016/j.juro.2007.01.112. PMID 17509356.
- Barocas, DA; Mathew, S; Delpizzo, JJ; Vaughan Ed, ED; Sosa, RE; Fine, RG; Akhtar, M; Scherr, DS (2007). "Renal cell carcinoma sub-typing by histopathology and fluorescence in situ hybridization on a needle-biopsy specimen". BJU International. 99 (2): 290–5. doi:10.1111/j.1464-410X.2006.06607.x. PMID 17092279. S2CID 27845456.
- Raman, JD; Dong, S; Levinson, A; Samadi, D; Scherr, DS (2007). "Robotic Radical Prostatectomy: Operative Technique, Outcomes, and Learning Curve". JSLS. 11 (1): 1–7. PMC 3015817. PMID 17651548.
- Raman, JD; Scherr, DS (2007). "Management of patients with upper urinary tract transitional cell carcinoma". Nature Clinical Practice Urology. 4 (8): 432–43. doi:10.1038/ncpuro0875. PMID 17673914. S2CID 21351473.
- Wang, GJ; Barocas, DA; Raman, JD; Scherr, DS (2008). "Robotic vs open radical cystectomy: prospective comparison of perioperative outcomes and pathological measures of early oncological efficacy". BJU International. 101 (1): 89–93. doi:10.1111/j.1464-410X.2007.07212.x. PMID 17888044. S2CID 10233606.
- Liu, H; Schwartz, MJ; Hwang, DH; Scherr, DS (2008). "Tumour growth inhibition by an imidazoquinoline is associated with c-Myc down-regulation in urothelial cell carcinoma". BJU International. 101 (7): 894–901. doi:10.1111/j.1464-410X.2008.07459.x. PMID 18241249. S2CID 205538510.
- Schwartz, MJ; Hwang, DH; Hung, AJ; Han, J; Mcclain, JW; Shemtov, MM; Te, AE; Sosa, RE; et al. (2008). "Negative influence of changing biopsy practice patterns on the predictive value of prostate-specific antigen for cancer detection on prostate biopsy". Cancer. 112 (8): 1718–25. doi:10.1002/cncr.23353. PMID 18330908.
- Richstone, L; Bianco, FJ; Shah, HH; Kattan, MW; Eastham, JA; Scardino, PT; Scherr, DS (2008). "Radical prostatectomy in men aged >or=70 years: effect of age on upgrading, upstaging, and the accuracy of a preoperative nomogram". BJU International. 101 (5): 541–6. doi:10.1111/j.1464-410X.2007.07410.x. PMID 18257855.
- Seandel, M; James, D; Shmelkov, SV; Falciatori, I; Kim, J; Chavala, S; Scherr, DS; Zhang, F; et al. (2007). "Generation of functional multipotent adult stem cells from GPR125+ germline progenitors". Nature. 449 (7160): 346–50. Bibcode:2007Natur.449..346S. doi:10.1038/nature06129. PMC 2935199. PMID 17882221.
- Barocas, DA; Rabbani, F; Scherr, DS; Vaughan Ed, ED (2006). "A population-based study of renal cell carcinoma and prostate cancer in the same patients". BJU International. 97 (1): 33–6. doi:10.1111/j.1464-410X.2005.05880.x. PMID 16336324. S2CID 10616104.
- Barocas, DA; Rohan, SM; Kao, J; Gurevich, RD; Del Pizzo, JJ; Vaughan Ed, Jr; Akhtar, M; Chen, YT; Scherr, DS (2006). "Diagnosis of renal tumors on needle biopsy specimens by histological and molecular analysis". The Journal of Urology. 176 (5): 1957–62. doi:10.1016/j.juro.2006.07.038. PMID 17070218.
- Raman, JD; Palese, MA; Ng, CK; Boorjian, SA; Scherr, DS; Del Pizzo, JJ; Sosa, RE (2006). "Hand-Assisted Laparoscopic Nephroureterectomy for Upper Urinary Tract Transitional Cell Carcinoma". JSLS. 10 (4): 432–8. PMC 3015762. PMID 17575752.
- Shelton, JB; Barocas, DA; Conway, F; Hart, K; Nelson, K; Richstone, L; Gonzalez, RR; Raman, JD; Scherr, DS (2005). "Prostate-specific antigen screening in a high-risk population: lessons from the community and how they relate to large-scale population-based studies". Urology. 65 (5): 931–6. doi:10.1016/j.urology.2004.11.047. PMID 15882726.
- Boorjian, S; Ng, C; Munver, R; Palese, MA; Vaughan Ed, Jr; Sosa, RE; Del Pizzo, JJ; Scherr, DS (2005). "Impact of delay to nephroureterectomy for patients undergoing ureteroscopic biopsy and laser tumor ablation of upper tract transitional cell carcinoma". Urology. 66 (2): 283–7. doi:10.1016/j.urology.2005.02.022. PMID 16098357.
- Pittsjr, W; Scherr, D (2005). "Unified theory of prostate cancer: the role of steroid 5 alpha reductase and steroid aromatase". Urology. 66 (3): 11–12. doi:10.1016/j.urology.2005.06.039.
- Barocas, DA; Kawamoto, H; Dreizin, DF; Howard, ME; Choi, J; Pitts, WR; You, X; Tickoo, SK; et al. (2005). "Five-alpha-reductase expression in benign and malignant urothelium: correlation with disease characteristics and outcome". Urology. 66 (5): 1134–9. doi:10.1016/j.urology.2005.06.079. PMID 16286153.
- Raman, JD; Mongan, NP; Tickoo, SK; Boorjian, SA; Scherr, DS; Gudas, LJ (2005). "Increased expression of the polycomb group gene, EZH2, in transitional cell carcinoma of the bladder". Clinical Cancer Research. 11 (24 Pt 1): 8570–6. doi:10.1158/1078-0432.CCR-05-1047. PMID 16361539.
- Raman, JD; Ng, CK; Boorjian, SA; Vaughan Ed, ED; Sosa, RE; Scherr, DS (2005). "Bladder cancer after managing upper urinary tract transitional cell carcinoma: predictive factors and pathology". BJU International. 96 (7): 1031–5. doi:10.1111/j.1464-410X.2005.05804.x. PMID 16225523. S2CID 26096624.
- Raman, JD; Mongan, NP; Liu, L; Tickoo, SK; Nanus, DM; Scherr, DS; Gudas, LJ (2006). "Decreased expression of the human stem cell marker, Rex-1 (zfp-42), in renal cell carcinoma". Carcinogenesis. 27 (3): 499–507. doi:10.1093/carcin/bgi299. PMID 16344273.
- Boorjian, S; Scherr, DS; Mongan, NP; Zhuang, Y; Nanus, DM; Gudas, LJ (2005). "Retinoid receptor mRNA expression profiles in human bladder cancer specimens". International Journal of Oncology. 26 (4): 1041–8. doi:10.3892/ijo.26.4.1041. PMID 15754000.
- Boorjian, S; Ng, C; Munver, R; Palese, MA; Sosa, RE; Vaughan, ED; Del Pizzo, JJ; Scherr, DS (2004). "Abnormal selective cytology results predict recurrence of upper-tract transitional-cell carcinoma treated with ureteroscopic laser ablation". Journal of Endourology. 18 (9): 912–6. doi:10.1089/end.2004.18.912. PMID 15659932.
- Richstone, L; Scherr, DS; Reuter, VR; Snyder, ME; Rabbani, F; Kattan, MW; Russo, P (2004). "Multifocal renal cortical tumors: frequency, associated clinicopathological features and impact on survival". The Journal of Urology. 171 (2 Pt 1): 615–20. doi:10.1097/01.ju.0000106955.19813.f6. PMID 14713772.
- Boorjian, S; Tickoo, SK; Mongan, NP; Yu, H; Bok, D; Rando, RR; Nanus, DM; Scherr, DS; Gudas, LJ (2004). "Reduced lecithin: retinol acyltransferase expression correlates with increased pathologic tumor stage in bladder cancer". Clinical Cancer Research. 10 (10): 3429–37. doi:10.1158/1078-0432.CCR-03-0756. PMID 15161698.
- Boorjian, S; Ugras, S; Mongan, NP; Gudas, LJ; You, X; Tickoo, SK; Scherr, DS (2004). "Androgen receptor expression is inversely correlated with pathologic tumor stage in bladder cancer". Urology. 64 (2): 383–8. doi:10.1016/j.urology.2004.03.025. PMID 15302512.
- Chen, David Y. T.; Sosa, RE; Scherr, DS (2004). "Treatment of adrenocortical carcinoma: Contemporary outcomes". Current Urology Reports. 5 (1): 65–72. doi:10.1007/s11934-004-0014-x. PMID 14733841. S2CID 41696275.
- Scherr, D; Swindle, PW; Scardino, PT; National Comprehensive Cancer Network (2003). "National Comprehensive Cancer Network guidelines for the management of prostate cancer". Urology. 61 (2 Suppl 1): 14–24. doi:10.1016/S0090-4295(02)02395-6. PMID 12667883.
- Scherr, Douglas S.; Ng, C; Munver, R; Sosa, RE; Vaughan Jr, ED; Del Pizzo, J (2003). "Practice patterns among urologic surgeons treating localized renal cell carcinoma in the laparoscopic age: technology versus oncology". Urology. 62 (6): 1007–11. doi:10.1016/S0090-4295(03)00773-8. PMID 14665345.
- Scherr, DS; Pitts Wr, Jr (2003). "The nonsteroidal effects of diethylstilbestrol: the rationale for androgen deprivation therapy without estrogen deprivation in the treatment of prostate cancer". The Journal of Urology. 170 (5): 1703–8. doi:10.1097/01.ju.0000077558.48257.3d. PMID 14532759.
- Knudsen, Beatrice S; Gmyrek, GA; Inra, J; Scherr, DS; Vaughan, ED; Nanus, DM; Kattan, MW; Gerald, WL; Vande Woude, GF (2002). "High expression of the Met receptor in prostate cancer metastasis to bone☆". Urology. 60 (6): 1113–7. doi:10.1016/S0090-4295(02)01954-4. PMID 12475693.
- Scherr, D; Pittsjr, WR; Vaughanjr, ED (2002). "Diethylstilbesterol Revisited: Androgen Deprivation, Osteoporosis and Prostate Cancer". The Journal of Urology. 167 (2 Pt 1): 535–8. doi:10.1016/S0022-5347(01)69080-3. PMID 11792913.
- Scherr, DS; Eastham, J; Ohori, M; Scardino, PT (2002). "Prostate biopsy techniques and indications: when, where, and how?". Seminars in Urologic Oncology. 20 (1): 18–31. doi:10.1053/suro.2002.30395. PMID 11828354.
- Chen, A; Scherr, D; Eid, JF (2000). "Renal Transplantation After in Vivo Excision of an Angiomyolipoma from a Living Unrelated Kidney Donor". The Journal of Urology. 163 (6): 1859. doi:10.1016/S0022-5347(05)67561-1. PMID 10799200.
- "ERRATA". The Journal of Urology. 162 (2): 503. 1999. doi:10.1016/S0022-5347(05)68615-6.
- Scherr, DS; Vaughan Ed, Jr; Wei, J; Chung, M; Felsen, D; Allbright, R; Knudsen, BS (1999). "BCL-2 and p53 expression in clinically localized prostate cancer predicts response to external beam radiotherapy". The Journal of Urology. 162 (1): 12–6, discussion 16–7. doi:10.1097/00005392-199907000-00003. PMID 10379729.
- Scherr, D; Goldstein, M (1999). "Comparison of bilateral versus unilateral varicocelectomy in men with palpable bilateral varicoceles". The Journal of Urology. 162 (1): 85–8. doi:10.1097/00005392-199907000-00021. PMID 10379746.
- Scherr, D; Poppas, DP (1998). "Laser Tissue Welding". Urologic Clinics of North America. 25 (1): 123–35. doi:10.1016/S0094-0143(05)70439-0. PMID 9529543.
- Poppas, DP; Scherr, DS (1998). "Laser tissue welding: a urological surgeon's perspective". Haemophilia. 4 (4): 456–62. doi:10.1046/j.1365-2516.1998.440456.x. PMID 9873775. S2CID 1078110.
- Schultz, PK; Herr, HW; Zhang, ZF; Bajorin, DF; Seidman, A; Sarkis, A; Fair, WR; Scherr, D; et al. (1994). "Neoadjuvant Chemotherapy for Invasive Bladder Cancer: Prognostic Factors for Survival of Patients Treated with M-VAC with Five-Year Follow-Up". Journal of Clinical Oncology. 12 (7): 1394–1401. doi:10.1200/JCO.1994.12.7.1394. PMID 8021730.
