= Vicki Sato =

American biologist

Vicki L. Sato
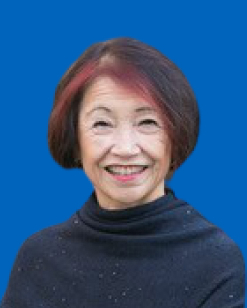
- Education: Harvard University
- Known for: Vertex Pharmaceuticals
- Scientific career
- Fields: Biotechnology
- Workplaces: Harvard Business School
- Doctoral advisor: Paul Levine
- Other academic advisors: Leonard Herzenberg

Vicki L. Sato is a retired professor of management practice at Harvard Business School and a professor of the practice in the department of molecular and cell biology at Harvard University. Since 2021, she has been a member of the President’s Council of Advisors on Science and Technology (PCAST).

== Background and career ==
She earned her A.B. in biology from Radcliffe College and her A.M. and Ph.D. (1972) in biology from Harvard University focusing on the genetics of photosynthesis under the guidance of Paul Levine. She then did her postdoctoral work at University of California, Berkeley with Kenneth Sauer and Stanford Medical Center with Leonard Herzenberg where she shifted fields from biophysics into immunology. Initially, she returned to Harvard as a professor in the Department of Cell and Developmental Biology. During that time, she co-taught immunology with Walter Gilbert who was beginning to found Biogen Inc. along with Phil Sharp, Charles Weissmann, and Kenneth Murray. During her sabbatical after eight years at Harvard, she became involved with a startup and eventually joined Biogen Inc. in 1984. In 1992, she left as the VP of Research and a member of the Scientific Board. She then joined Vertex Pharmaceuticals as the chief scientific officer before becoming the senior VP of research and development and ultimately serving as the president of Vertex Pharmaceuticals from 2000 to 2005. During her tenure, the drugs Avonex, Tysabri, and Telaprevir were developed.

After retirement, she joined the faculty at Harvard in 2006 where she researched innovation and productivity in biotechnology and pharmaceutical research and development. She retired from Harvard in 2017.

She serves on the Board of Directors of Akouos, Allogene Therapeutics, Vir and Syros Pharmaceuticals. She was formerly on the Board of Directors for Bristol Myers Squibb, BorgWarner, PerkinElmer, Inc., Galapagos NV, and Alnylam Pharmaceuticals, Inc. She was also a founding member of the Scientific Board of the Broad Institute. She also acts as an advisor to Atlas Venture. She was given the Xport of the Year award by Xconomy in 2017.

She is married to Harvard Professor Lewis C. Cantley.
