= Heineke–Mikulicz strictureplasty =

Surgical procedure

Heineke–Mikulicz Strictureplasty is the most common among the conventional strictureplasties. Emmanuel Lee introduced this strictureplasty for the treatment of Crohn's disease in 1976. A similar technique for tubercular strictures of the terminal ileum was reported by RN Katariya et al. in 1977 This technique is similar to a Heineke–Mikulicz pyloroplasty from which it derives its name.

The technique is optimal to address short strictures (≤7 cm). This technique is performed by making a longitudinal incision on the antimesenteric side of the bowel, extending from 2 cm proximal to 2 cm distal to the stricture. The enterotomy is then closed in a transverse fashion in one or two layers.

Strictureplasties are categorized into three groups: Conventional, intermediate, and complex procedures. The Heineke–Mikulicz strictureplasty is the most common among the conventional stricutreplasties, the Finney strictureplasty is the most common intermediate strictureplasty, and the most common complex strictureplasty is the Michelassi strictureplasty.
