= Utthara Nayar =

Cancer researcher

Utthara Nayar is a cancer researcher based in Boston, Massachusetts. Her work focuses specifically on breast cancer.

== Biography ==
Nayar lived in the country of Oman during her childhood. She was encouraged to participate in science, with her passion being in biology and physics.

For her undergraduate degree Nayar attended the University of Wisconsin-Madison as a part of their biology Honors Program with a major in biology. She earned her doctorate through Weill Cornell Medical College. She is employed at Dana-Farber Cancer Institute as a researcher in the lab of Nikhil Wagle. She is also a member of a team at Harvard Medical School as a research affiliate.

== Research ==
At the Dana-Farber Cancer Institute, Nayar and her team have been investigating metastatic breast cancer and how hormones affect patient treatment. For some forms of breast cancer a patient is ER positive, or estrogen receptor positive, meaning that tumors grow as the levels of estrogen in the body increase. For this type of breast cancer, patients quickly become resistant to the treatment methods available and their bodies stop responding to any medical help they receive, seemingly without any connection. However, Nayar and her team found a link in patients who became resistant to ER positive treatment- many had HER-2 gene mutations. This possible discovery has spurred on a five-year phase 2 trial by Nayar and her team, investigating the connection between ER positive treatment rejection and the HER-2 gene.

== Publications ==
Journal Publications
Year	Publication
2013	Nayar, U., Pin Lu, Goldstein, R. L., Vider, J., Ballon, G., Rodina, A., ... Cesarman, E. (2013). Targeting the Hsp90-associated viral oncoproteome in gammaherpesvirus-associated malignancies. Blood, 122(16), 2837–2847. https://doi.org/10.1182/blood-2013-01-479972
2017	Nayar, U., Sadek, J., Reichel, J., Hernandez-Hopkins, D., Akar, G., Barelli, P. J., ... Cesarman, E. (2017). Identification of a nucleoside analog active against adenosine kinase-expressing plasma cell malignancies. Journal of Clinical Investigation, 127(6), 2066–2080. https://doi.org/10.1172/JCI83936

== Awards and recognition ==
In 2012 while at Cornell, Nayar was awarded the AACR-Aflac, Inc. Scholar-in-Training Award.

In 2018 while working at the Dana-Farber Cancer Institute, Nayar was awarded the 2018 Women In Cancer Research Scholar Award by the American Association for Cancer Research for her work with breast cancer.
