= Lewis C. Cantley =

American biochemist

- Born: February 20, 1949 (age 77); West Virginia, U.S.
- Education: West Virginia Wesleyan College; Cornell University
- Known for: PI-3-kinase; Phosphatidylinositol (3,4,5)-trisphosphate Oriented Peptide Libraries/Scansite; Phosphatidylinositol 5-phosphate
- Scientific career
- Fields: Biochemistry; Cell Biology; Systems Biology
- Workplaces: Weill Cornell Medical College; Harvard Medical School; Beth Israel Deaconess Medical Center; Tufts University; Harvard University
- Doctoral advisor: Gordon Hammes
- Other academic advisors: Guido Guidotti
- Notable students: Alex Toker, Matthew Vander Heiden, Reuben Shaw, Jeffrey Engelman, Benjamin Turk, Michael Yaffe, Brendan Manning, Jared Johnson

Lewis Clayton Cantley (born February 20, 1949) is an American cell biologist and biochemist who has made significant advances to the understanding of cancer metabolism. Among his most notable contributions are the discovery and study of the enzyme PI-3-kinase, now known to be important to understanding cancer and diabetes mellitus. He was Meyer Director and Professor of Cancer Biology at the Sandra and Edward Meyer Cancer Center at Weill Cornell Medicine in New York City. He is a professor in the Departments of Systems Biology and Medicine at Harvard Medical School, and the Director of Cancer Research at the Beth Israel Deaconess Medical Center, in Boston, Massachusetts. In 2016, he was elected Chairman of the Board for the Hope Funds for Cancer Research.

== Biography ==
Cantley grew up in West Virginia, remaining there at Wesleyan College where he graduated summa cum laude in chemistry in 1971. Cantley obtained his PhD at Cornell University in Ithaca, New York, where he worked with Gordon Hammes on enzyme kinetics, using FRET to study enzyme conformational changes. In 1975 he moved to Harvard University for a postdoctoral fellowship under Guido Guidotti, where he discovered that an impurity in commercial preparations of ATP, vanadate, acts as a transition state analog for phosphate hydrolysis. In 1978 Cantley became assistant professor of Biochemistry and Molecular Biology at Harvard, being promoted to associate professor in 1981. In 1985, he became a full professor in physiology at Tufts University School of Medicine. In 1985 Cantley and colleagues Malcolm Whitman, David Kaplan, Tom Roberts, and Brian Schaffhausen made the seminal discovery of the existence of phosphoinositide-3-kinase (PI3K). In 1992, Cantley moved to Harvard Medical School as a Professor of Cell Biology and the Director of the Division of Signal Transduction at the former Beth Israel Hospital (now Beth Israel Deaconess Medical Center). In 2003, Cantley became a founding member of the newly formed Department of Systems Biology at Harvard Medical School. In 2007, Cantley also became the Director of Cancer Research at the Beth Israel Deaconess Medical Center. He joined the faculty of Weill Cornell Medicine and NewYork–Presbyterian Hospital in 2012. Dr. Cantley was elected the Chairman of the Board of the Hope Funds for Cancer Research in 2016. In 2022, he rejoined his former departments at Harvard and the Dana–Farber Cancer Institute.

Cantley is married to Vicki Sato, herself a prominent figure in the pharmaceutical industry and a professor at Harvard University in both the Business and Medical Schools.

== Research ==
=== Discovery of PI-3-kinase and PtdIns(3,4)P2 ===
In a series of studies spanning several years, Cantley and colleagues demonstrated that a kinase activity associated with the middle T oncoprotein is a phosphoinositide kinase, that it is a novel type of phosphoinositide kinase that phosphorylates the 3' position on the inositol ring, and that this phosphatidylinositol-3-kinase (PI-3-kinase) is activated by growth factors to produce novel 3'-phosphorylated phosphoinositides, in particularly PtdIns(3,4,5)P3 that had previously been identified in physiologically stimulated human neutrophils. In subsequent years Cantley and colleagues identified critical aspects of the regulation of PI-3-kinase by growth factor receptors. Specifically, they discovered that the catalytic subunit p110 dimerizes with the regulatory subunit p85, and that the SH2 domain of p85 specifically recognized phosphotyrosines on growth factor receptors or adaptor proteins via the pY-X-X-M motif.

The Cantley lab has also made seminal contributions to understanding signaling downstream of PI-3-kinase. They discovered that the Pleckstrin Homology domain of AKT binds to PtdIns(3,4,5)P3 (and PtdIns(3,4)P2) and that this binding is critical for activation of AKT catalytic activity. They further demonstrated that tuberin/TSC2 is a critical substrate of AKT, and together with the laboratory of John Blenis they discovered that AKT phosphorylation of tuberin/TSC2 is required for activation of mTOR TORC1 kinase activity via regulation of the small GTPase rheb. The Cantley lab also was one of a few labs that nearly simultaneously identified LKB1 as a regulator of AMPK that also serves to regulate TORC1.

For the discovery of PI-3-Kinase and its role in cancer metabolism, Cantley was one of eleven recipients of the inaugural Breakthrough Prize in Life Sciences, "the world's richest academic prize for medicine and biology. The prize, which carries a $3 million cash award, recognizes excellence in research aimed at curing intractable diseases and human life." The fundamental and far-reaching nature of the discovery of PI-3-kinase, together with Cantley's role in mapping the upstream regulation of PI-3-kinase and the downstream signaling pathways, have led to speculation that Cantley is a likely candidate for the Nobel prize in Medicine or Physiology. The growing evidence for a primary role for PI-3-kinase in cancer and its critical role in insulin signaling have served to strengthen the significance of this fundamentally important discovery.

The first drug targeting the PI-3-kinase pathway as a treatment for cancer – Idelalisib (PI3K Delta inhibitor) – was approved by the FDA as a treatment for leukemia and two types of lymphoma in July 2014. Other drugs are currently in clinical development.

=== Use of Oriented Peptide Libraries to determine phosphopeptide binding specificity and protein kinase substrate specificity ===
In 1994, the Cantley lab published a novel strategy to determine the sequence specificity of phosphopeptide binding domains (initially SH2 domains). Subsequently, the oriented peptide library approach was extended to identify the substrate specificity of protein kinases toward synthetic peptides. This approach was then extended to characterize the specificity of Ser/Thr kinases and phospho-Ser/Thr binding domains. This approach was used to characterize the substrate specificity of a large number of protein kinases. The kinase specificity matrices generated from these experiments served as the basis for creating the website Scansite, allowing the de novo identification of candidate phosphorylation sites in an arbitrary protein.

In later research, the oriented peptide library approach has also been used to characterize protease cleavage specificity. Modification of the original oriented peptide approach has allowed for large scale, kinome-wide determination of protein kinase specificity.

=== Discovery of PtdIns(5)P ===
In 1997, the Cantley lab discovered that the enzymes that had been referred to as type II PIP-kinases, instead of using PtdIns(4)P as a substrate, in fact required PtdIns(5)P as a substrate to produce PtdIns(4,5)P2. Further research demonstrated that PtdIns(5)P is naturally occurring in all eukaryotes.

Of the seven naturally occurring phosphoinositides, the existence of four of them (PtdIns(5)P, PtdIns(3)P, PtdIns(3,4)P2, and PtdIns(3,4,5)P3) was discovered by Cantley and colleagues.

=== Role of metabolism in cancer ===
The role of PI-3-kinase in anabolic signaling by insulin, IGF-1, and other growth factors makes a straightforward link between metabolism and cancer, especially in light of the discovery that the PIK3CA gene encoding PI-3-kinase is an oncogene.

In recent years Cantley and colleagues have made additional links between metabolic regulation and oncogenic transformation with their discovery that the M2 isoform of pyruvate kinase is associated with cancer. This discovery provides a molecular basis for understanding the Warburg effect. Cantley is now a major player in the resurgence of the importance of the Warburg effect in the process of oncogenesis.

=== Role of PI-3-kinase in different cancers ===
Cantley was part of the Stand Up to Cancer "dream team" that was brought together to investigate ways to target PI-3-kinase as a way to treat women's cancers, and he now leads a national effort targeting triple-negative breast cancer and ovarian cancer with novel drug combinations. Recent research found that high levels of Vitamin C halted the growth of aggressive forms of colorectal tumors. His lab also elucidated the role of Nrf2 in serine production in non-small cell lung cancer, with potential implications for pancreatic and other cancers as well.

== Industrial activities ==
Lewis C. Cantley has been involved in numerous companies. Recent examples include the following:

- Co-founder of Petra Pharma (with Nathanael Gray).
- Co-founder of Agios Pharmaceuticals (with Tak Mak and Craig B. Thompson).
- Co-founder of Volastra Therapeutics (with Sam Bakhoum and Olivier Elemento), developing treatments targeting chromosomal instability in cancer.
- Co-founder of Marendis Therapeutics (with Tomer Yaron-Barir and Olivier Elemento), targeting drug resistance in cancer.

== Awards, honors and media appearances ==
Cantley has received numerous awards and honors, including:

- ASBMB Avanti Award for Lipid Research (1998)
- Elected to the American Academy of Arts and Sciences (1999)
- Heinrich Wieland Prize for Lipid Research (2000)
- Elected to the National Academy of Sciences (2001)
- Caledonian Prize from the Royal Society of Edinburgh (2002)
- Pezcoller-AACR International Award for Cancer Research (2005)
- Rolf Luft Award of the Karolinska Institute (2009)
- Pasrow Prize for Cancer Research (2011)
- Breakthrough Prize in Life Sciences (2013)
- Jacobaeus Prize for Diabetes Research, from the Karolinska Institute (2013)
- Elected to the Institute of Medicine of the National Academies (2014)
- AACR Princess Takamatsu Memorial Lectureship (2015)
- Ross Prize in Molecular Medicine (2015)
- Canada Gairdner International Award (2015)
- Elected to European life sciences academy EMBO (2015)
- The Association of American Cancer Institutes Distinguished Scientist Award (2015)
- Thomson Reuter's "The World's Most Influential Scientific Minds 2015".
- The Wolf Prize in Medicine (2016)
- The Hope Funds Award of Excellence in Basic Science (2016)
- Louisa Gross Horwitz Prize (Columbia University) (2019)

He appeared in the 60 Minutes program "Is sugar toxic?".
