= Finney strictureplasty =

Surgical procedure in Intestine

- Specialty: Gastroenterology

Finney strictureplasty is a procedure in gastroenterology. It is indicated for strictures up to 15 centimetres (5.9 in). The Finney strictureplasty is performed by folding the diseased bowel on itself and creating a large opening between the two loops. This strictureplasty can be used to address longer strictures—greater than 7 centimetres (2.8 in) and not greater than 15 centimetres (5.9 in)—than those manageable with the Heineke-Mikulicz technique (usually performed for strictures up to 7 cm).

The Finney strictureplasty is named after the Finney pyloroplasty, first described in 1937. The strictured loop is folded over itself at its midpoint section, forming a U shape. A longitudinal enterotomy is then performed halfway between the mesenteric and the antimesenteric side on the folded loop. The opposed edges of the bowel are sutured together to create a short side-to-side anisoperistaltic enteroenterostomy. Concerns about long-term complications, such as bacterial overgrowth in the bypassed segment, limit the length of the stricture to be addressed by this strictureplasty to less than 15 cm.

Strictureplasties are categorized into three groups: conventional, intermediate, and complex procedures. The Heineke–Mikulicz strictureplasty is the most common among the conventional strictureplasties, the Finney strictureplasty is the most common intermediate strictureplasty, and the most common complex strictureplasty is the Michelassi strictureplasty.
