= Weill Cornell Medicine =

Medical school of Cornell University

Joan and Sanford I. Weill Medical College of Cornell University
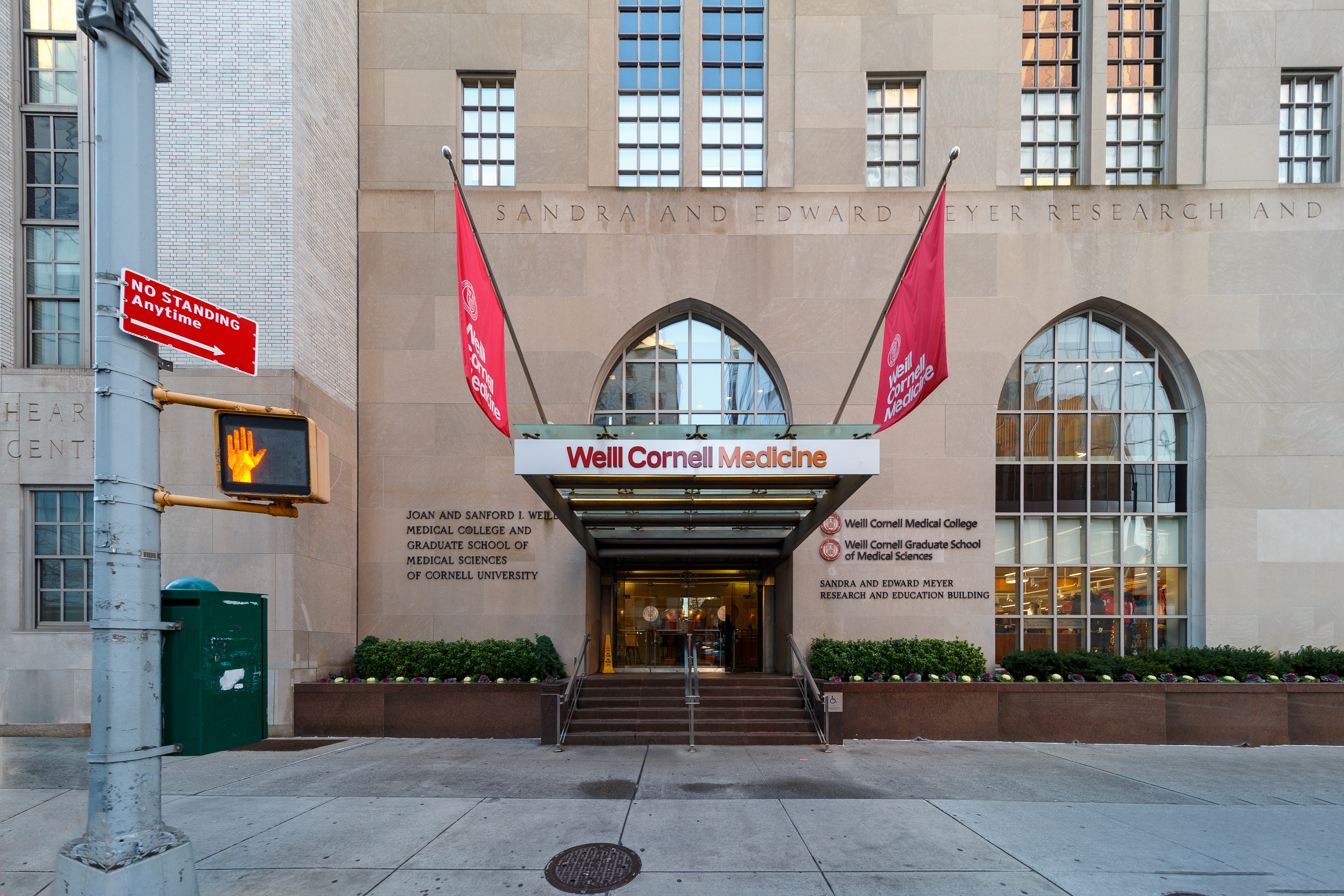
- The York Avenue entrance to Weill Cornell Medicine in December 2021
- Former names: Cornell University Medical College, Weill Cornell Medical College
- Type: Private medical school
- Established: 1898 (as Cornell University Medical College)
- Parent institution: Cornell University
- Affiliations: NewYork-Presbyterian/Weill Cornell Medical Center; Weill Cornell Medical College in Qatar
- Dean: Robert A. Harrington
- Faculty: 1,814
- Students: 414
- Location: 1300 York Avenue, New York City, U.S. 40°45′52.38″N 73°57′14.93″W
- Website: weill.cornell.edu

Weill Cornell Medicine (/waɪl/; officially Joan and Sanford I. Weill Medical College of Cornell University), originally Cornell University Medical College, is the medical school of Cornell University, located on the Upper East Side neighborhood of Manhattan in New York City, New York, United States.

The school and its associated research organization is affiliated with several hospitals and medical centers, including NewYork-Presbyterian Hospital, Weill Cornell Medical Center, Hospital for Special Surgery, Memorial Sloan Kettering Cancer Center, and Rockefeller University, all of which are located on or near York Avenue and Sutton Place. Since 2004, Weill Cornell has also been affiliated with Houston Methodist Hospital.

In 1991, Memorial Sloan Kettering Cancer Center and Rockefeller University joined Weill Cornell to establish the Tri-Institutional MD–PhD Program. In 2001, the school opened the Weill Cornell Medical College in Qatar, a medical school in Qatar.

== History ==
=== 19th century ===
Weill Cornell Medicine

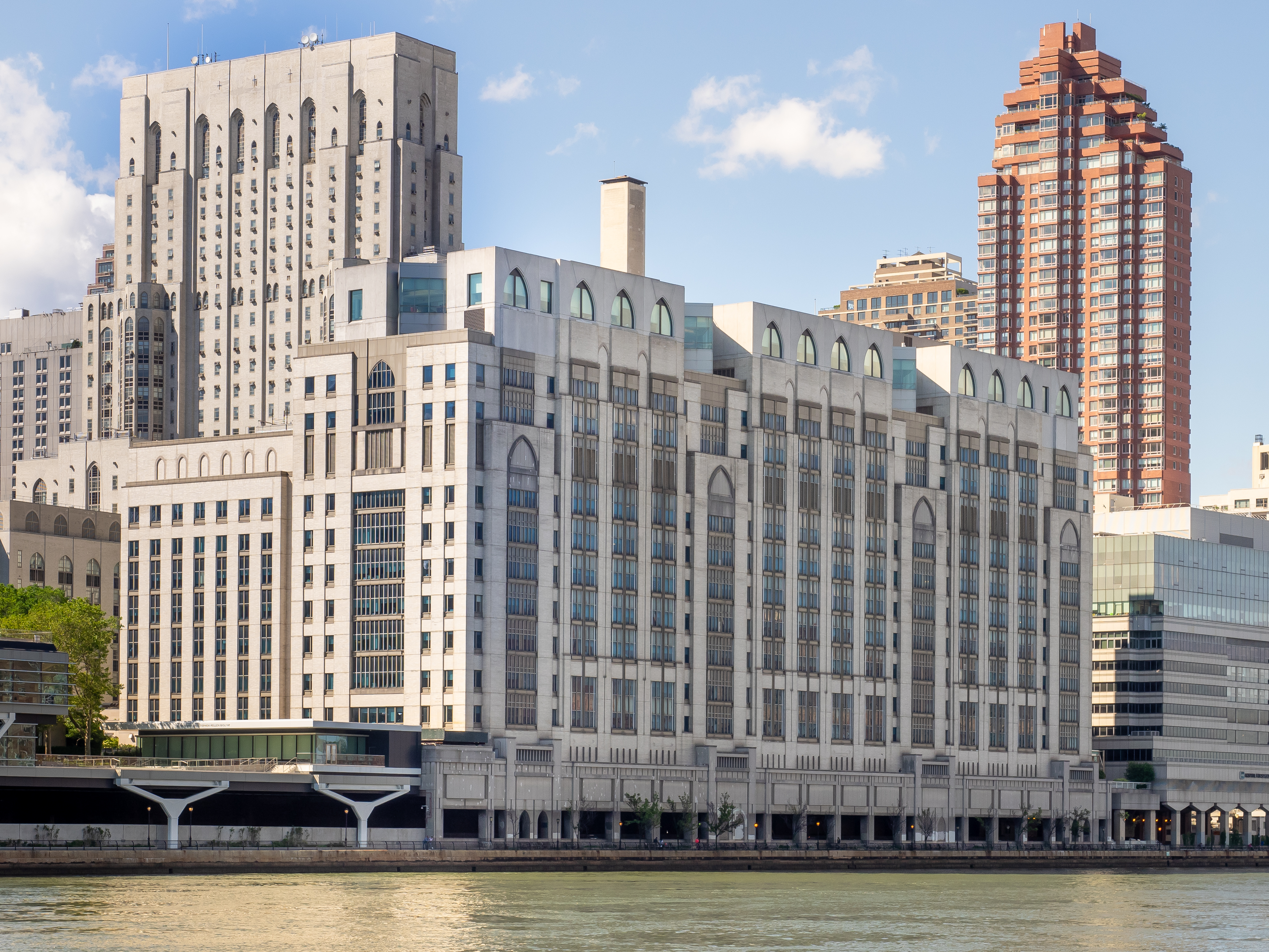
Weill Cornell Medicine's facade on the East River

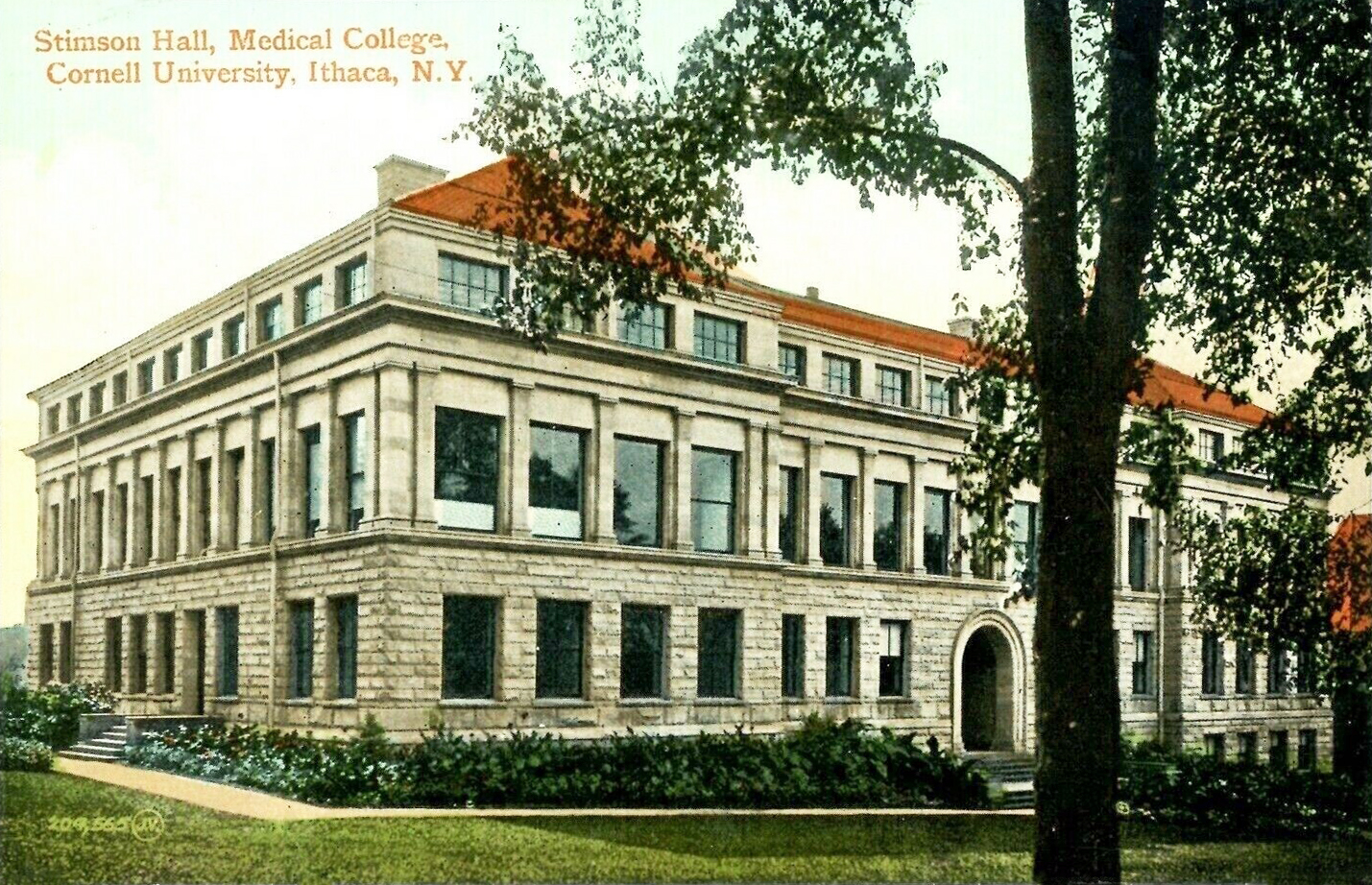
Cornell Medical College's Stimson Hall on the main campus in Ithaca in 1910

The Cornell Medical College was founded on April 14, 1898, with an endowment by Col. Oliver H. Payne. The college was established in New York City because Ithaca, where the Cornell main campus is located, was deemed too small to offer adequate clinical training opportunities. James Ewing was the first professor of clinical pathology at the school, and for a while the only full-time professor.

=== 20th century ===
The college founded the medical fraternity, Phi Delta Epsilon, on October 13, 1904.

A branch of the medical school operated in Stimson Hall on the main campus. The two-year Ithaca course paralleled the first two years of the New York school. The Ithaca location closed in 1938 due to declining enrollment.

The school became affiliated with New York Hospital, now NewYork–Presbyterian Hospital, in 1913. The institutions opened a joint hospital-educational campus in Yorkville in 1932.

In 1927, William Payne Whitney's $27 million donation led to the building of the Payne Whitney Psychiatric Clinic, which became the name for Cornell's large psychiatric effort. Its Training School for Nurses became affiliated with the university in 1942, operating as the Cornell Nursing School until it closed in 1979.

In 1936, the Swiss professor and psychiatrist Oskar Diethelm contributed a collection of more than 10,000 titles related to the history of psychiatry, helping to build up the Oskar Diethelm Historical Library.

The Cornell University Medical College was renamed the "Joan and Sanford I. Weill Medical College of Cornell University" after then-Citigroup chairman Sanford I. Weill pledged a $100 million donation to Cornell University for its biomedical research in 1998.

=== 21st century ===
In 2015, the school was renamed Weill Cornell Medicine.

On September 16, 2019, Augustine M.K. Choi announced Weill Cornell Medicine would make the cost of attendance free for all students who qualify for financial aid, made possible by a $160 million gift from The Starr Foundation, directed by Weill Cornell Medicine overseer Maurice R. Greenberg, in partnership with gifts from Joan and Board of Overseers Chairman Emeritus Sanford I. Weill.

In March 2024, Augustine M.K. Choi, professor and former Dean of Weill Cornell Medicine, was accused of altering data for two decades in his research on animals.

== DeWitt Wallace Institute ==
The DeWitt Wallace Institute of Psychiatry: History, Policy, and the Arts at Weill Cornell, was formerly known as The History of Psychiatry Section. Founded in 1958 by Dr. Eric T. Carlson, the institute is devoted to the study of the history of the mind-sciences and the preservation of resources on the history of psychology, psychiatry, psychoanalysis, neuroscience and other related disciplines. Its companion library, the Oskar Diethelm Library, houses over 50,000 titles on these subjects, with the earliest dating to the 14th century. The present Director is George Makari.

== Notable alumni ==
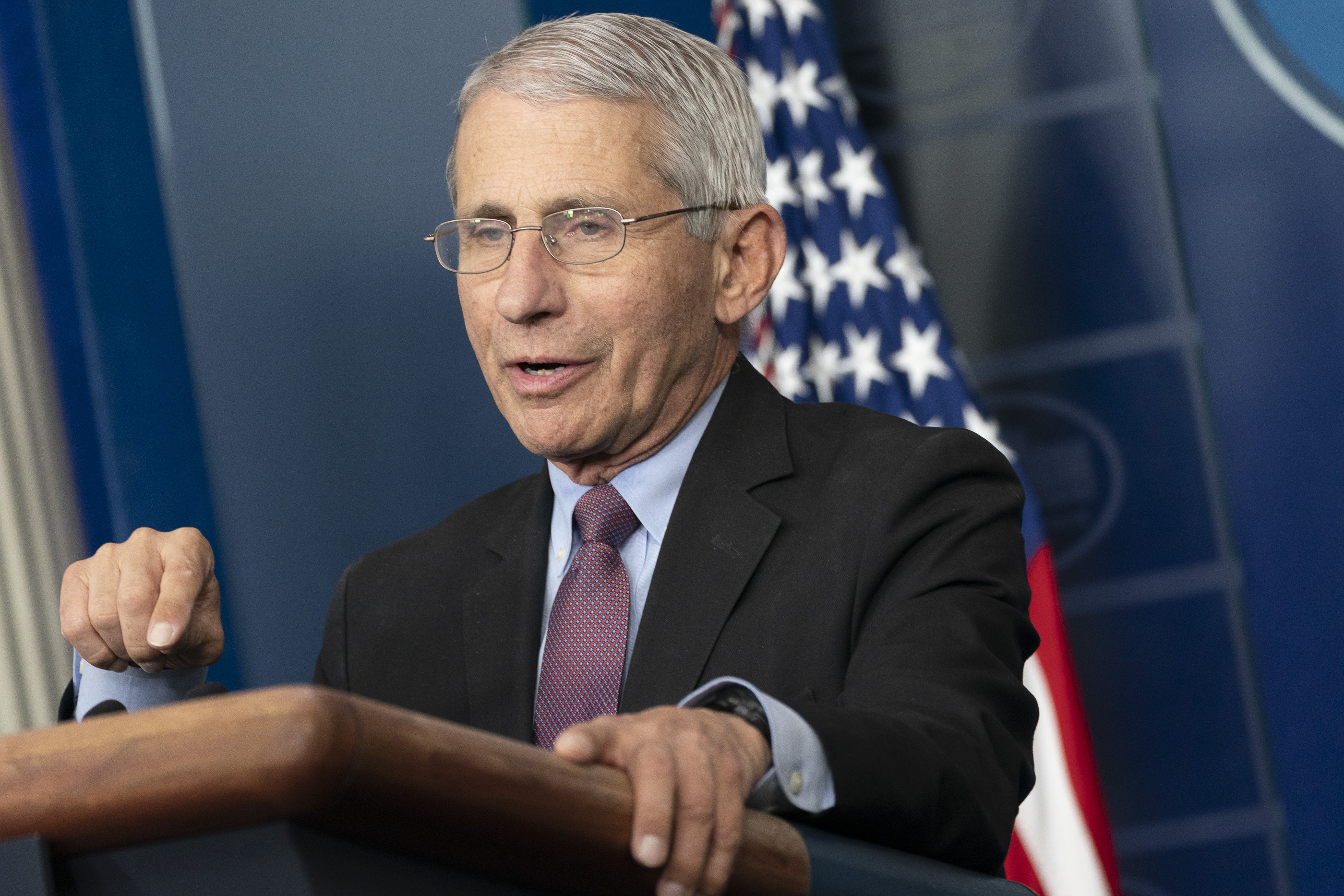
Anthony Fauci, a 1966 Weill Cornell Medicine alumnus

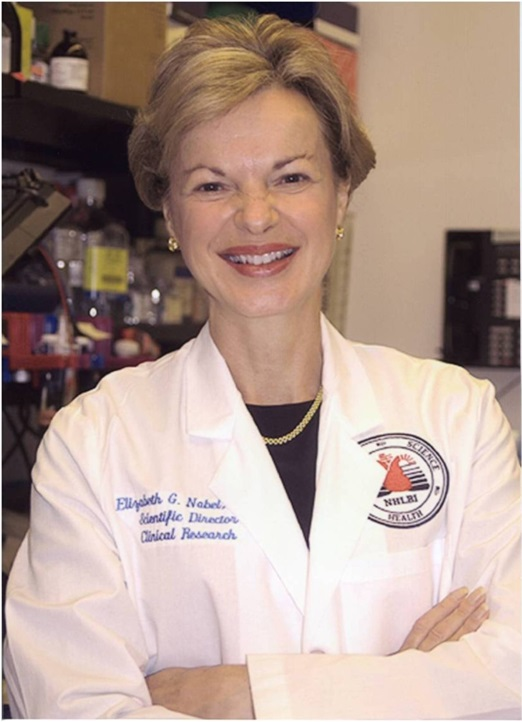
Elizabeth Nabel, a 1981 Weill Cornell Medicine alumnus

- Iqbal Mahmoud Al Assad, pediatric cardiologist
- Robert Atkins, creator of the Atkins Diet
- Hilary Blumberg, professor of psychiatric neuroscience
- Carlos Cordon-Cardo, physician and scientist
- John P. Donohue, physician and testicular cancer researcher
- Mario Gaudino, cardiac surgeon and coronary revascularization expert
- Anthony Fauci, former director of the National Institute of Allergy and Infectious Disease
- John Gartner, psychotherapist; author; former Johns Hopkins University Medical School professor; founder or dutytowarn.org PAC
- Wilson Greatbatch, inventor of the cardiac artificial pacemaker
- Iser Ginzburg, physician and journalist
- Nan Hayworth, physician and former U.S. Representative
- Henry Heimlich, physician and namesake of the Heimlich maneuver
- Roy S. Herbst, oncologist, lung cancer researcher, and academic at Yale Cancer Center and Yale School of Medicine
- Richard Hooker, surgeon and writer
- Peter Hotez, scientist, pediatrician, advocate in the fields of global health and vaccinology
- John Howland, pediatrician
- Mae C. Jemison, former astronaut
- Amy Kelley, geriatrician and palliative care specialist, deputy director of the National Institute on Aging
- C. Everett Koop, former Surgeon General
- Bonnie Mathieson, scientist and HIV/AIDS researcher
- Alton Meister, scientist and HIV/AIDS researcher
- Elizabeth Nabel, president of Brigham and Women's Hospital
- Utthara Nayar, cancer researcher at the Dan-Farber Cancer Institute
- James Peake, former United States Secretary of Veterans Affairs
- Jacob Robbins, endocrinologist at the National Institutes of Health
- Ida S. Scudder, medical missionary in India
- Ruth Westheimer, sex therapist and talk show host

== Notable faculty ==
- David H. Abramson, ophthalmic surgeon
- Jonathan Avery, addiction psychiatrist
- Lewis C. Cantley, Meyer Director and Professor of Cancer Biology at the Sandra and Edward Meyer Cancer Center at Weill Cornell Medicine
- Olivier Elemento, Director of the Englander Institute for Precision Medicine
- Mario Gaudino, professor of cardiothoracic surgery, principal investigator of the ROMA trial, a multinational trial of radial artery grafting in CABG
- Antonio Gotto, cardiologist and dean emeritus
- Amos Grunebaum, obstetrician and gynecologist
- David P. Hajjar, dean emeritus, Professor and Professor of Pathology and Biochemistry, and the Frank Rhodes Distinguished Professor of Cardiovascular Biology and Genetics
- Allan McLane Hamilton, Professor of Psychiatry at Cornell Medical College
- Yoon Kang, Richard P. Cohen, M.D. Professor of Medical Education and the senior associate dean for education
- Ben Kean, Professor of Medicine, founder of the Tropical Medicine Unit, chief of the Parasitology Laboratory at New York Hospital, and personal physician to the Shah of Iran, whose health and treatment was a factor in the Iran Hostage Crisis
- Otto F. Kernberg, psychiatrist
- David Kissane, Professor of Psychiatry and Chairman, Department of Psychiatry and Behavioral Sciences and inaugural Jimmie C. Holland Chair in Psychiatric Oncology at Memorial Sloan Kettering Cancer Center
- Bruce Lerman, cardiologist, the Hilda Altschul Master Professor of Medicine at Weill Cornell Medical College, and Chief of the Division of Cardiology and Director of the Cardiac Electrophysiology Laboratory at Weill Cornell Medicine and the New York Presbyterian Hospital
- Fabrizio Michelassi, Lewis Atterbury Stimson Professor and Chairman of the Department of Surgery at Weill Cornell Medicine
- John P. Moore, virologist and professor at Weill Cornell Medicine
- Georgios Papanikolaou, Former professor of clinical anatomy at Cornell University Medical College, inventor of the Pap test
- Rajiv Ratan, professor, administrator, scientist, and the Burke Professor of Neurology and Neuroscience at Weill Cornell Medicine
- Douglas Scherr, surgeon, medical researcher and Clinical Director of Urologic Oncology at Weill Cornell Medicine
- Harold E. Varmus, Nobel Prize-winning scientist and the Lewis Thomas University Professor of Medicine at Weill Cornell Medicine
- Radu Lucian Sulica, Professor and Chief, Laryngology and Voice Disorders
- Ruth Westheimer (born Karola Siegel, 1928; known as "Dr. Ruth"), German American sex therapist, talk show host, author, professor, Holocaust survivor, and former Haganah sniper

== See also ==
- List of Ivy League medical schools
- Tri-Institutional MD–PhD Program
- Weill Cornell Graduate School of Medical Sciences
