= Yoon Kang =

American internist and academic administrator

- Education: University of Pennsylvania; Washington University in St. Louis
- Scientific career
- Fields: Internal medicine, medical simulation
- Workplaces: Washington University in St. Louis; Cornell University

Yoon Kang is an American internist and academic administrator specializing in medical simulation. She is the Richard P. Cohen, M.D. Professor of Medical Education and the senior associate dean for education at Weill Cornell Medicine.

== Life ==
Kang completed a B.S., summa cum laude, in economics with a concentration in finance from the Wharton School at the University of Pennsylvania in 1991. She earned a M.D. from the Washington University School of Medicine in 1995. Kang completed an internal medicine residency and served as chief resident at Barnes-Jewish Hospital.

Kang worked as the director of standardized patient programs at the Washington University School of Medicine. She joined the Weill Cornell Medicine in 2003 as an assistant professor of medicine. She specializes in medical simulation and technology-based education innovation. She led the simulation education program and became the founding director of the Margaret and Ian Smith Clinical Skills Center in 2006. Kang was promoted to assistant professor in 2009 and an associate professor later that year. In 2015, she became the first assistant dean of clinical curriculum. She was promoted to associate dean for program development and operations (medical education), and associate dean for program development, operations, and continuous quality improvement. She became the acting senior associate dean of education in January 2019, succeeding Barbara L. Hempstead. She formally assumed the role on December 9, 2019. In 2023, she became the Richard P. Cohen, M.D. Professor of Medical Education and a professor of medicine.
