= Michelassi strictureplasty =

Surgical technique used to treat Crohn's disease

- Specialty: Colorectal surgery

The side-to-side isoperistaltic strictureplasty, also now known as the Michelassi stricureplasty, was designed to avoid sacrificing large amounts of small bowel in case of long segments of stricturing Crohn's disease.

In this strictureplasty the long loop of the bowel affected by Crohn's disease is first divided at its midpoint. The two halves are then moved side to side. A very long opening is created between two loops, which are then sutured together.

The recent extension of this technique to Crohn's disease of the last portion of the small bowel (terminal ileum) going into the right colon is poised to change the paradigm of surgical treatment of terminal ileitis from a conventional resection (ileocolectomy) to a bowel sparing procedure. This technique is now used around the globe. Long-term results with this technique are very satisfactory.

Strictureplasties are categorized into three groups: Conventional, intermediate, and complex procedures. The Heineke-Mikulicz Strictureplasty is the most common among the conventional stricutreplasties, the Finney Strictureplasty is the most common intermediate strictureplasty, and the most common complex strictureplasty is the Michelassi Strictureplasty.
