= Iqbal El-Assaad =

Arab-American pediatric physician and researcher

- Born: February 2, 1993 (age 33); Palestine

Iqbal Mahmoud El-Assaad (Arabic: إقبال محمود الأسعد, romanized: Iqbāl Maḥmūd al-Asʻad; also romanized as Iqbal Al Assad) is a Palestinian physician whose research has focused on cardiology. She was recognized as one of the youngest doctors in the world when she completed her medical training at age 20.

== Biography ==
Iqbal Mahmoud Al Assad was born February 2, 1993, in Palestine to a Palestinian father and a Lebanese mother. Her father’s family is originally from Mughr al-Khayt, a village in Safed. At the time of the Nakba, her family sought refuge in the Beqaa region in Lebanon, where her grandfather and his children worked in agriculture. She graduated from high school at age 12 and at age 20 had graduated from the Weill Cornell Medical College in Qatar with a degree in general medicine. She was honored as the youngest Arab doctor after completing her medical accreditation at the age of 20. She has also been rated as one of the most influential women in the Arab world.

She pursued a residency in pediatrics at Cleveland Clinic Children's Hospital after witnessing the disparities in healthcare among the Palestinian refugees in Lebanon. She held the Pediatric Cardiology Fellowship at Boston Children's Hospital and is scheduled to graduate in June 2020. She plans to pursue a subspecialty fellowship in pediatric electrophysiology afterwards.

== Awards ==
- Children's Hospital of Philadelphia Cardiology Outstanding Investigator Award. Project: "Patient and Neighborhood Level Characteristics as Predictors of Survival in Pediatric Out-of-Hospital Arrests"
- Qatar foundation scholarship. Facilitated by the Lebanon Ministry of Education.

== Indexed publications ==
- El-Assaad, Iqbal; Al-Kindi, Sadeer G.; Oliveira, Guilherme H.; Houghtaling, Penny; Wilkoff, Bruce L.; Boyle, Gerard J.; Aziz, Peter F. (August 2015). "Pacemaker implantation in pediatric heart transplant recipients: Predictors, outcomes, and impact on survival". Heart Rhythm. 12 (8): 1776–1781. doi:10.1016/j.hrthm.2015.04.045. ISSN 1556-3871. PMID 25956965.
- El-Assaad, Iqbal; Al-Kindi, Sadeer G.; Oliveira, Guilherme H.; Boyle, Gerard J.; Aziz, Peter F. (December 2015). "Implantable cardioverter-defibrillator and wait-list outcomes in pediatric patients awaiting heart transplantation". Heart Rhythm. 12 (12): 2443–2448. doi:10.1016/j.hrthm.2015.07.036. ISSN 1556-3871. PMID 26247317.
- El-Assaad, Iqbal; Al-Kindi, Sadeer G.; Abraham, JoEllyn; Sanatani, Shubhayan; Bradley, David J.; Halsey, Colby; Law, Ian H.; Balaji, Seshadri; Shetty, Ira (October 2016). "Use of dofetilide in adult patients with atrial arrhythmias and congenital heart disease: A PACES collaborative study". Heart Rhythm. 13 (10): 2034–2039. doi:10.1016/j.hrthm.2016.07.016. ISSN 1556-3871. PMID 27435587.
- El-Assaad, Iqbal; Al-Kindi, Sadeer G.; Saarel, Elizabeth V.; Aziz, Peter F. (June 2017). "Lone Pediatric Atrial Fibrillation in the United States: Analysis of Over 1500 Cases". Pediatric Cardiology. 38 (5): 1004–1009. doi:10.1007/s00246-017-1608-7. ISSN 1432-1971. PMID 28374048.
- El-Assaad, Iqbal; Al-Kindi, Sadeer G.; Aziz, Peter F. (December 2017). "Trends of Out-of-Hospital Sudden Cardiac Death Among Children and Young Adults". Pediatrics. 140 (6): e20171438. doi:10.1542/peds.2017-1438. ISSN 1098-4275. PMID 29180463.
- El-Assaad, Iqbal; Al-Kindi, Sadeer G.; McNally, Bryan; Vellano, Kimberly; Worley, Sarah; Tang, Anne S.; Aziz, Peter F.; CARES Surveillance Group (October 2018). "Automated External Defibrillator Application Before EMS Arrival in Pediatric Cardiac Arrests". Pediatrics. 142 (4): e20171903. doi:10.1542/peds.2017-1903. ISSN 1098-4275. PMID 30262669.
- El-Assaad, Iqbal; Hood-Pishchany, M. Indriati; Kheir, John; Mistry, Kshitij; Dixit, Avika; Halyabar, Olha; Mah, Douglas Y.; Meyer-Macaulay, Colin; Cheng, Henry (2020-07-15). "Complete Heart Block, Severe Ventricular Dysfunction, and Myocardial Inflammation in a Child With COVID-19 Infection". JACC: Case Reports. 2 (9): 1351–1355. doi:10.1016/j.jaccas.2020.05.023. PMC 7237189. PMID 32835278.
- El Assaad, Iqbal; Gauvreau, Kimberlee; Rizwan, Raheel; Margossian, Renee; Colan, Steven; Chen, Ming Hui (2020-07-01). "Value of Exercise Stress Echocardiography in Children with Hypertrophic Cardiomyopathy". Journal of the American Society of Echocardiography. 33 (7): 888–894.e2. doi:10.1016/j.echo.2020.01.020. ISSN 0894-7317. PMID 32279939.
