= Strictureplasty =

Surgical procedure performed to alleviate bowel narrowing

- Specialty: Gastroenterology

Strictureplasty (also spelled Stricturoplasty) is a surgical procedure performed to alleviate bowel narrowing due to scar tissue that has built up in the intestinal wall from inflammatory bowel conditions such as Crohn's disease. The scar tissue accumulates as a result of repeated damage and healing, with the scarring causing a stricture (a narrowing of the lumen of the bowel). The narrowing can force bowel contents into fissures and ulcers at the site, causing additional damage and narrowing. The surgery restores free flow through the bowel without the need for removing bowel segments (i.e., without bowel resection).

The first strictureplasty for Crohn's disease was performed by Emanoel Lee in 1976 and was reported in 1982. The course of the following two decades several papers demonstrated that strictureplasties were safe and effective.

Strictureplasties are categorized into three groups: Conventional, intermediate, and complex procedures. The Heineke-Mikulicz Strictureplasty is the most common among the conventional stricutreplasties. Best-suited for short (up to 7 centimeters) strictures, the H-M Strictureplasty is performed by making a cut lengthwise along one side of the bowel, pushing the two ends of the cut together and then suturing the bowel widthwise (picture), thus, having the effect of widening the segment of narrowed bowel, therefore resolving the stricture.

The Finney Strictureplasty is the most common intermediate strictureplasty. Indicated for strictures up to 15 centimeters, the Finney Strictureplasty is performed by folding the diseased bowel on itself and creating a large opening between the two loops.

For multiple strictures or for longer strictures neither the conventional nor the intermediate strictureplasties are suitable. In these cases surgeons need to use complex procedures. The most common complex strictureplasty is the Michelassi Strictureplasty. In this strictureplasty the long loop of the bowel affected by Crohn's is first divided at its midpoint. The two halves are then moved side to side. A very long opening is created between the two loops, which are then sutured together (Figure 1), (Figure 2), (Figure 3), (Figure 4).

Multiple strictureplasty can be performed in the same patient. All strictureplasty techniques spare the patient from bowel resections, an important consideration in a chronic recurrent intestinal condition or in patients with short gut. In addition, recent data suggests that strictureplasty has a protective effect on disease recurrence. Because of the reconfiguration of the bowel, strictureplasty causes slight discontinuities in peristalsis, visible in some imaging tests.
