= Enterotomy =

Surgical incision into an intestine

Enterotomy is the surgical incision into an intestine. It may be purposeful or a complication of an abdominal surgery, such as exploratory laparotomies or hernia repair.

An enterotomy can be done to remove an obstruction or foreign body from the intestine.

If an accidental enterotomy is not noticed during surgery, it can take days to become apparent. Surgical repair is required.
