= List of pathologists =

Thus is a list of people notable in the field of pathology.

== A ==
- John Abercrombie, Scottish physician, neuropathologist and philosopher.
- Maude Abbott (1869–1940), Canadian pathologist, one of the earliest women graduated in medicine, expert in congenital heart diseases.
- Emile Achard (1860–1944), French internist and pathologist.
- A. Bernard Ackerman (1936–2008), American dermatopathologist & dermatologist
- Lauren Ackerman (1905–1993), American pathologist and one of the fathers of Surgical pathology.
- Theodor Ackermann (1825–1896), German pathologist.
- Albert Wojciech Adamkiewicz (1850–1921), Polish pathologist, (see Artery of Adamkiewicz).
- W. Stewart Alexander, contemporary British pathologist (see Alexander disease).
- Dame Ingrid Allen, Northern Irish neuropathologist.
- Friedrich August von Ammon (1799–1861), German ophthalmologist and pathologist.
- Gabriel Andral (1797–1876) French pathologist.
- Peter Angritt (1938-2024), U.S. Army colonel and clinical pathologist
- Nikolay Anichkov (1885–1964), Russian pathologist.
- Julius Arnold (1835–1915), German pathologist.
- Ludwig Aschoff (1866–1942), German pathologist, discoverer of the Aschoff body and the Atrioventricular node in the heart.
- Max Askanazy (1865–1940), German pathologist (see Askanazy cell).
- E. Ask-Upmark, 20th-century Swedish pathologist (see Ask-Upmark kidney).

== B ==
- Matthew Baillie (1761–1823), British physician and pathologist, credited with first identifying transposition of the great vessels and situs inversus.
- Heinrich von Bamberger (1822–1888), Austrian pathologist from Prague.
- Paul Clemens von Baumgarten (1848–1928), German pathologist.
- John Bruce Beckwith (1933–2025), American pathologist (see Beckwith–Wiedemann syndrome).
- Antonio di Paolo Benivieni (1443–1502), Florentine physician who pioneered the use of the autopsy and many medical historians have considered him a founder of pathology.
- Franz Best (1878–1920), German pathologist (see Best's disease).
- Xavier Bichat (1771–1802), French anatomist and physiologist, remembered as father of modern histology and pathology.
- Max Bielschowsky (1869–1940), German neuropathologist & developer of histochemical stains.
- Edmund Biernacki (1866–1912), Polish pathologist (see Biernacki Reaction).
- Felix Victor Birch-Hirschfeld (1842–1899), German pathologist.
- Giulio Bizzozero (1846–1901), Italian doctor and medical researcher.
- Otto Bollinger (1843–1909), German pathologist.
- Charles-Joseph Bouchard (1837–1915), French pathologist.
- William Boyd (1885–1979), Scottish-Canadian physician, pathologist, academic and author of several 20th-century textbooks on general and surgical pathology.
- Erich Franz Eugen Bracht (1882–1969), German pathologist and gynaecologist.
- Fritz Brenner (1877–1969), German pathologist (see Brenner tumor).
- Alexander Breslow (1928–1980), American pathologist (see Breslow's depth).
- Richard Bright (1789–1858), British internist and pathologist (see Bright's disease).
- Ludwig von Buhl (1816–1880), German pathologist.

== C ==
- Santiago Ramón y Cajal (1852–1934), Spanish pathologist and Nobel laureate in Physiology or Medicine 1906
- Francis Camps (1905–1972), English forensic pathologist.
- Myrtelle Canavan (1879–1953), American physician, medical researcher, and one of the first female pathologists (see Canavan disease).
- Karl Friedrich Canstatt (1807–1850), German physician, pathologist, and medical author.
- Marie Cassidy (born 1959), Irish forensic pathologist.
- Benjamin Castleman (1906–1982), American surgical pathologist and eponymist of Castleman's disease.
- Jamie Chapman (1970–present), Australian ground-breaking histologist.
- Hans Chiari (1851–1916), Austrian pathologist (see Arnold–Chiari malformation, Budd–Chiari syndrome).
- Jacob Churg (1910–2005), Russian-born American pathologist (see Churg–Strauss syndrome).
- Giuseppe Vincenzo Ciaccio (1824–1901), Italian anatomist and histologist.
- Julius Friedrich Cohnheim (1839–1884), German pathologist known for his research on the mechanism of inflammation and the study of circulation.
- Albert Coons (1912–1978), American physician, immunologist, & immunopathologist.
- Astley Cooper (1768–1841), English surgeon, anatomist & pathologist.
- Victor André Cornil (1837–1908), French pathologist and histologist.
- Dominic Corrigan (1802–1880), Irish physician & pathologist (see Corrigan's pulse).
- Ramzi Cotran, American pathologist
- William Thomas Councilman (1854–1933), American pathologist (see Councilman body).
- Jean Cruveilhier (1791–1874), French anatomist and pathologist (see Cruveilhier's sign, Cruveilhier–Baumgarten disease).

== D ==
- David C. Dahlin (1917–2003) American surgical & orthopedic pathologist.
- Jean Baptiste Hippolyte Dance (1797–1832) French pathologist.
- Ferdinand-Jean Darier (1856–1938), French pathologist and dermatologist.
- James R. Dawson (1908–1986), American pathologist (see Dawson encephalitis).
- Francis Delafield (1841–1915), American physician & pathologist.
- Franz Dittrich (1815–1859), Austrian-Bohemian-German pathologist.
- Karl Gottfried Paul Döhle (1855–1928), German pathologist & histologist (see Döhle bodies).
- William L. Donohue (1906–1985), Canadian pathologist (see Donohue syndrome).
- Georges Dreyer (1873–1934), Danish pathologist, professor of pathology at Oxford University.
- I. N. Dubin (born 1913), American pathologist (see Dubin–Johnson syndrome).
- Cuthbert Dukes (1890–1977), English physician and pathologist for whom the Dukes classification for colorectal cancer is named.
- Guillaume Dupuytren (1777–1835), French military surgeon & surgical pathologist.

== E ==
- Karl Joseph Eberth (1835–1926), German pathologist and bacteriologist.
- William E. Ehrich (1900–1967), German-American pathologist, professor of pathology at Philadelphia General Hospital and the Graduate School of Medicine of the University of Pennsylvania.
- Paul Ehrlich (1854–1915), German physician, researcher and pathologist, Nobel laureate, one of the founders of immunology & laboratory medicine.
- Jakob Erdheim (1874–1937), Austrian pathologist (see Erdheim–Chester disease).
- James Ewing (1866–1943), American surgical pathologist, first professor of pathology at Cornell University, eponymist of Ewing's sarcoma, one of the founders of AACR.

== F ==
- Robert (Robin) Sanno Fåhræus (1888–1968), Swedish pathologist (see Fåhræus effect and Fåhræus–Lindqvist effect).
- Sidney Farber (1903–1973), American pediatric pathologist, regarded as the father of modern chemotherapy, and after whom the Dana–Farber Cancer Institute is named.
- Martin J. Fettman (born 1956), American veterinarian, veterinary pathologist, and astronaut
- Johannes Andreas Grib Fibiger (1867–1928), Danish physician & pathologist, Nobel laureate in Physiology or Medicine 1926.
- Paul Flechsig (1847–1929), German neuroanatomist, psychiatrist and neuropathologist.
- Christopher D. M. Fletcher, Anglo-American pathologist
- Friedrich Theodor von Frerichs (1819–1885), German pathologist.
- Nikolaus Friedreich (1825–1882), German pathologist and neurologist.
- August von Froriep (1849–1917), German anatomist.
- Robert Froriep (1804–1861), German anatomist and medical publisher.

== G ==
- Carl Jakob Adolf Christian Gerhardt (1833–1902), German pathologist
- Joseph von Gerlach (1820–1896), German professor of anatomy, pioneer of histological staining and micrography
- Gustav Giemsa (1867–1948), German physician, pathologist, & histochemist (see Giemsa stain)
- Anthony Gill (born 1972), Australian pathologist and medical researcher
- Camillo Golgi (1843–1926), Italian neuropathologist & Nobel laureate in Physiology or Medicine, 1906
- Ernest Goodpasture (1886–1960), American pathologist, eponymist of Goodpasture's syndrome
- Austin Gresham (1925–2009), English forensic pathologist

== H ==
- Hakaru Hashimoto (1881–1934), Japanese medical scientist.
- Ludvig Hektoen (1863–1951), American researcher on pathology of infectious diseases.
- Arnold Ludwig Gotthilf Heller (1840–1913), German anatomist and pathologist.
- Friedrich Gustav Jakob Henle (1809–1885), German physician, pathologist and anatomist.
- Richard L. Heschl (1824–1881), Austrian anatomist & pathologist.
- Thomas Hodgkin (1798–1866), English physician & pathologist; eponymist of Hodgkin's disease.
- Friedrich Albin Hoffmann (1843–1924), German internist and pathologist.
- Jason Hornick, American pathologist and researcher
- Karl Hürthle (1860–1945), German physiologist and histologist.
- Helen Hart (1900–1971), American plant pathologist

== J ==
- Elaine Jaffe, American pathologist, expert in research, diagnostics and classification of lymphomas, particularly follicular lymphoma.

== K ==
- Fujiro Katsurada (1867–1946), Japanese pathologist.
- Eduard Kaufmann (1860–1931), German pathologist.
- Ernest Kennaway (1881–1958), English clinical chemist and researcher on carcinogenesis.
- Jack Kevorkian (1928–2011), American pathologist, controversial advocate of euthanasia.
- Theodor Albrecht Edwin Klebs (1834–1913), German-Swiss pathologist.
- Julius von Kossa 19th-century Austro-Hungarian pathologist (see Von Kossa stain).
- Leiv Kreyberg (1896–1984), Norwegian war hero, humanitarian and pathologist known for typology of lung cancer.
- Hans Kundrat (1845–1893), Austrian pathologist.
- Kathleen Coard (born 1952), Grenadian pathologist.

== L ==
- Paul Eston Lacy (1924–2005), former chairperson of pathology at Washington University and diabetes researcher.
- Paul Langerhans (1847–1888), German pathologist, physiologist and biologist.
- William Boog Leishman (1865–1926), English authority on the pathology of human parasitic diseases (see leishmaniasis)
- George Lignac (1891–1954), Dutch pathologist-anatomist.
- Henrique da Rocha Lima (1879–1956), Brazilian physician, pathologist and infectologist
- James Linder (born 1954), American cytopathologist and technological developer
- Leo Loeb (1869–1959), American pathologist and early cancer researcher.
- Esmond Ray Long (1890–1970), American pathologist, epidemiologist, and medical historian.

== M ==
- Frank Burr Mallory (1862–1941), American surgical pathologist & histochemist (see Mallory bodies)
- Rod Markin (born 1956) American pioneer in laboratory automation.
- Alexander A. Maximow (1874–1928), Russian-American scientist, histologist and embryologist.
- John McCrae (1872–1918), Canadian pathologist, physician, soldier and poet, author of [In Flanders Fields].
- Frances Gertrude McGill (1882–1959), pioneering Canadian pathologist and criminologist
- Tracey McNamara, veterinary pathologist at the Bronx Zoo who played a pivotal role in identifying the first outbreak of West Nile Virus in the United States
- Giovanni Battista Morgagni (1682–1771), Italian pathologist, considered the father of modern Anatomical Pathology

== N ==
- Heijiro Nakayama (1871–1956), Japanese pathologist.
- Bernhard Naunyn (1839–1925), German pathologist.
- Franz Ernst Christian Neumann (1834–1918), German pathologist.
- Thomas Noguchi (born 1927), Japanese American forensic pathologist & medical examiner.

== O ==
- Shuji Ogino (born 1968), Japanese pathologist, epidemiologist, Harvard University professor, and pioneer in molecular pathological epidemiology.
- Eugene Lindsay Opie (1873–1971), American pathologist and researcher on tuberculosis.
- Johannes Orth (1847–1923), German pathologist.
- William Osler (1849–1919), Canadian physician and pathologist, founder professor at Johns Hopkins Hospital.

== P ==
- Richard Paltauf (1858–1924), Austrian pathologist and bacteriologist.
- George Nicolas Papanicolaou (1883–1962), Greek-American cytopathologist & developer of the Papanicolaou cervical smear (see Pap smear)
- Artur Pappenheim (1870–1916), German physician, developer of histochemical stains.
- Lukáš Plank (born 1951), Slovak pathologist specializing in oncopathology and hematopathology.
- Emil Ponfick (1844–1913), German pathologist.

== R ==
- Louis-Antoine Ranvier (1835–1922), French physician, pathologist, anatomist and histologist, discoverer of nodes of Ranvier.
- Ronald Rapini (born 1948), US dermatopathologist; discoverer of sclerotic fibroma.
- Friedrich Daniel von Recklinghausen (1833–1910), German pathologist.
- Benno Reinhardt (1819–1852), German physician, specialized in pathological anatomy.
- Donald Rix (1931–2009), founder of a Canadian commercial pathology laboratory.
- Carl von Rokitansky (1804–1878), Bohemian autopsy pathologist.
- Juan Rosai (1940–2020), Italian-American surgical pathologist, discoverer of Rosai-Dorfman disease and the desmoplastic small round cell tumor.
- Gustave Roussy (1874–1948), Swiss-French neuropathologist.

== S ==
- Christian Georg Schmorl (1861–1932), German pathologist.
- Richard Scolyer (1966–2026), Australian pathologist
- Johann Lukas Schönlein (1793–1864), German naturalist, and pathologist.
- Charles Scott Sherrington (1857–1952), English neuropathologist & Nobel laureate in Physiology or Medicine 1932
- Richard Shope (1901–1966), American virologist and pathologist.
- Keith Simpson (1907–1985), English forensic pathologist.
- Maud Slye (1879–1954), American experimental pathologist.
- Theobald Smith (1859–1934), American pioneering epidemiologist and pathologist.
- Kim Solez (born 1946), American pathologist, father of the Banff Classification of Transplantation Pathology.
- Sir Bernard Spilsbury (1877–1947), British pathologist.
- Sophie Spitz (1910–1956), American surgical pathologist, eponymist of Spitz nevus
- Edward Stafne (born 1894, date of death unknown), American oral pathologist (see Stafne defect).
- Allen Starry (1890–1973), American pathologist (see Warthin–Starry stain).
- Javier Arias Stella (1924–2020), Peruvian pathologist, describer of the Arias Stella reaction in the endometrium.
- Stephen Sternberg (1920–2021), American pathologist, founding Editor-in-Chief of The American Journal of Surgical Pathology and editor of several 20th-century pathology textbooks.
- Arthur Purdy Stout (1885–1967). American surgeon and pathologist, & one of the fathers of modern Surgical pathology.
- Lotte Strauss (1913–1985), American pathologist (see Churg–Strauss syndrome).

== T ==
- Sunao Tawara (1873–1952), Japanese pathologist, discoverer of the Atrioventricular node.
- Donald Teare (1911–1979), British pathologist.
- Jacques-René Tenon (1724–1816), French surgeon and pathologist.
- Ludwig Traube (1818–1876), German physician, co-founder of the experimental pathology in Germany.
- Václav Treitz (1819–1872), Czech pathologist.
- Charles Emile Troisier (1844–1919), French doctor.

== U ==
- Johann Paul Uhle (1827–1861), German physician and pathologist.
- Paul Gerson Unna (1850–1929), one of the founders of dermatopathology.
- James Underwood (born 1942), British pathologist.

== V ==
- José Verocay (1876–1927), Uruguayan pathologist (see Verocay body).
- Rudolf Virchow (1821–1902), German physician, politician, & the father of "cellular" pathology.
- Adolf Vossius (1855–1925), German pathologist (see Vossius ring).

== W ==
- Erik Waaler (1903–1997), Norwegian professor of medicine.
- Hermann Julius Gustav Wächter (born 1878, date of death unknown), German physician (see Bracht-Wachter bodies).
- Ernst Leberecht Wagner (1829–1888), German pathologist.
- Heinrich von Waldeyer-Hartz (1836–1921), German anatomist.
- Robin Warren (born 1937), Australian gastrointestinal pathologist & Nobel laureate in Physiology or Medicine, 2005.
- Aldred Scott Warthin (1866–1931), American pathologist (see Warthin–Starry stain).
- David Weatherall (1933–2013), British physician and researcher
- Friedrich Wegener (1907–1990), Nazi German pathologist (see granulomatosis with polyangiitis).
- Anton Weichselbaum (1845–1920), Austrian pathologist and bacteriologist.
- Carl Weigert (1845–1904), developer of histochemical stains.
- Adolf Weil (1848–1916), German physician and pathologist (see Weil's disease).
- Ronald S. Weinstein (1938–2021), American pathologist, inventor, educator (see Telepathology).
- Sharon Weiss (born 1945), American surgical pathologist, expert on soft tissue pathology (see Sarcoma).
- William Henry Welch (1850–1934), American physician, pathologist, bacteriologist, medical school administrator, founder professor at Johns Hopkins Hospital.
- Max Westenhöfer, (1871–1957), German pathologist, disciple of Rudolf Virchow, author of the aquatic ape hypothesis and influential on the development of pathology and social medicine in Chile.
- George Whipple (1878–1976), American physician, pathologist, biomedical researcher, and medical school educator and administrator, Nobel laureate in Physiology or Medicine, 1934.
- James Homer Wright (1869–1928), surgical pathologist and developer of histochemical stains (see Wright stain).
- Guy Alfred Wyon (1883–1924), English pathologist, one of the team which resolved the issue of potentially-fatal TNT poisoning in shell factories during World War I

== Y ==
- Yamagiwa Katsusaburō (1863–1930) Japanese pathologist, developed the concept of chemical carcinogenesis.

== Z ==
- Friedrich Wilhelm Zahn (1845–1904), German pathologist.
- Friedrich Albert von Zenker (1825–1898), German pathologist and physician.
- Hugo Wilhelm von Ziemssen (1829–1902), German pathologist and physician.

== See also ==
- Lists of people by occupation
