= Kehrer =

Kehrer is a rare German surname native to the mountain areas of Switzerland, Bavaria and Saxony. Etymologically, it appears to be a topographical name meaning "someone living by a bend in a road". In modern German it means a "cleaner" and this is assumed by some to be its origin as an occupational name. Notable people with the surname include:

- Caroline Victoria Kehrer (b. 1997), Canadian women's soccer player
- Christian Wilhelm Karl Kehrer (1775–1869), German court painter and archivist
- Emilio Giuseppe Kehrer (b. 2002), German soccer player
- Ferdinand Adolf Kehrer (1837–1914), German gynaecologist and obstetrician
- Gerd Kehrer (b. 1939), German painter
- Hugo Ludwig Kehrer (1876–1967), German art historian
- Jürgen Kehrer (b. 1956), German journalist and writer
- Karl Christian Kehrer (1755–1833), German portrait painter
- Klaus Kehrer (fl. 1995+), German book publisher
- Rudolf Kehrer (1923–2013), Georgian classical pianist
- Stefan Kehrer (b. 1985), German wrestler
- Thilo Kehrer (b. 1996), German soccer player
