= Ludwig von Buhl =

German pathologist

Ludwig von Buhl (4 January 1816 – 30 July 1880) was a German pathologist born in Munich.

He studied medicine at the Ludwig-Maximilians-Universität München and the University of Vienna, and in 1847 was habilitated as a lecturer of pathological anatomy and microscopy at the Ludwig-Maximilians-Universität München. In 1850, he was chosen as an associate professor, and from 1854 served as prosector at the university general hospital. In 1859, he was appointed professor of general pathology and pathological anatomy at the Ludwig-Maximilians-Universität München, where in 1875 he became director of the pathological institute. Two of his better known assistants were Ernst Schweninger (1850–1924) and Wilhelm Heinrich Erb (1840–1921).

With Max Pettenkofer (1818–1901), Carl von Voit (1831–1908) and Ludwig Adolph Timotheus Radlkofer (1829–1927), he published the biological journal Zeitschrift für Biologie. His best written effort was the 1872 Lungenentzündung, Tuberkulose und Schwindsucht, a book that was later translated into English as Inflammation of the lungs: tuberculosis and consumption (1874).

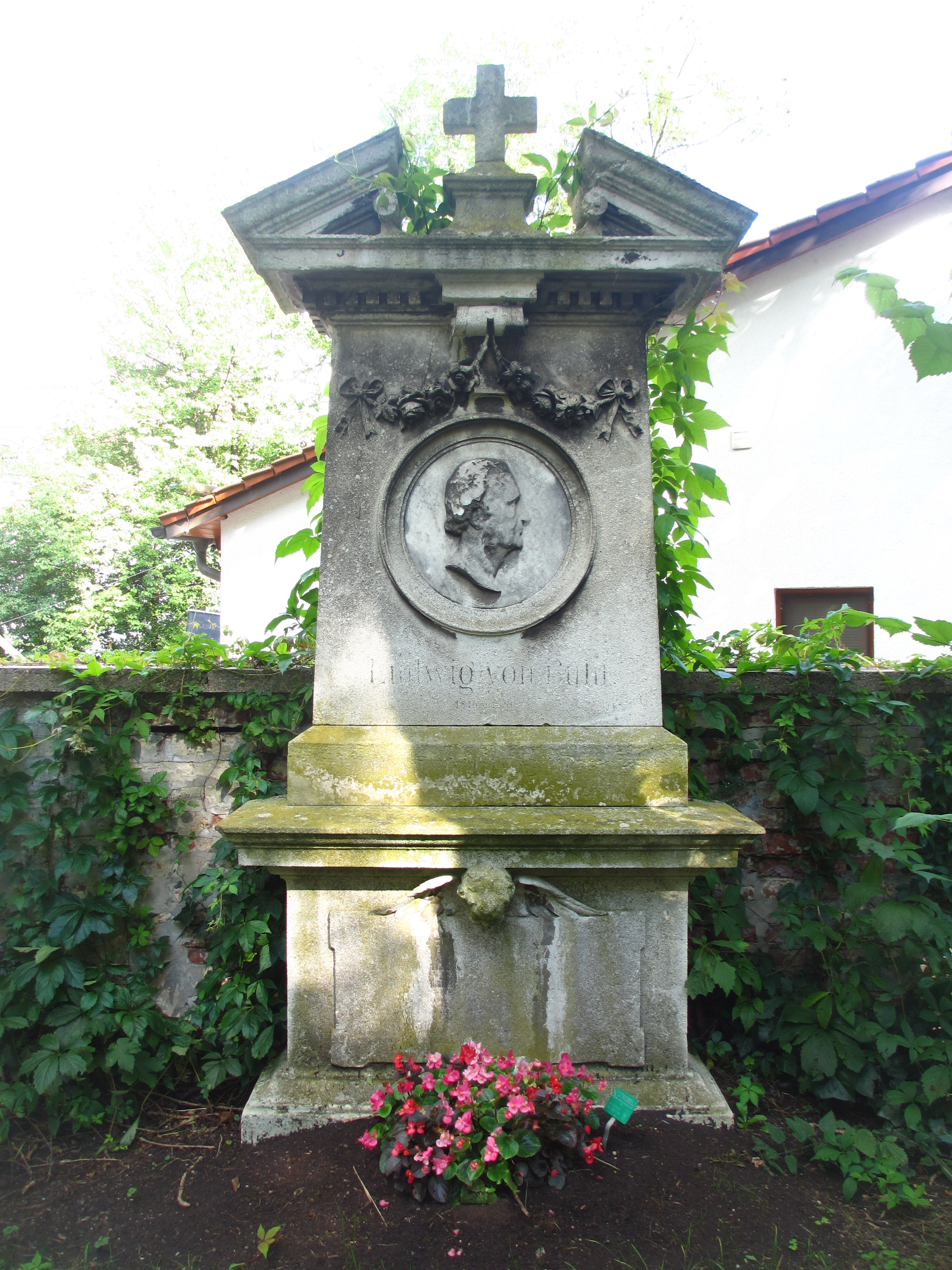
Gravesite of Buhl at Alter Südfriedhof in Munich

Buhl is remembered for his work with infectious diseases, in particular, pioneer research of miliary tuberculosis. With Austrian pathologist Franz Dittrich (1815–1859) is obtained the "Buhl-Dittrich law", a supposition that states that "In every case of acute miliary tuberculosis, there exists at least one old focus of causation in the body".

His name is associated with "Buhl's disease", a rare disorder of newborns that he first described in 1861. The disease is defined as an acute parenchymatous fatty degeneration of the liver, kidney, or heart, combined with hemorrhages into the various organs.

== Selected writings ==
- Klinik der Geburtskunde (Clinic of obstetrics), with Karl von Hecker (1827–1882); 1861.
- Lungenentzündung, Tuberkulose und Schwindsucht (Inflammation of the lungs, tuberculosis and consumption), 1872.
- Mitteilungen aus dem pathologischen Institut zu München (Messages from the pathological institute at Munich), 1877

== See also ==
- Pathology
- List of pathologists
