= August Eduard Martin =

German obstetrician and gynecologist (1847–1933)

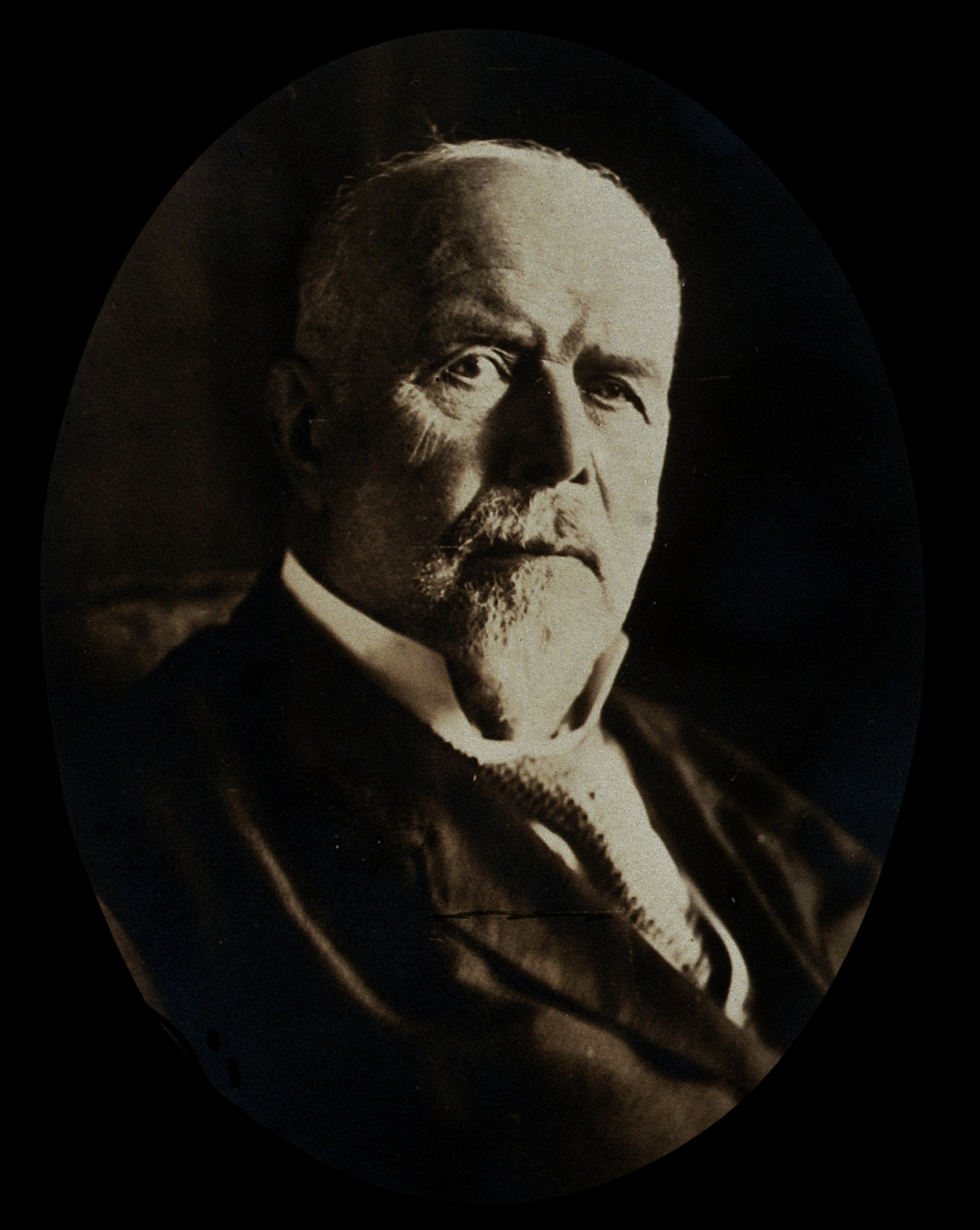
1927 portrait photograph

August Eduard Martin (14 July 1847, Jena – 26 November 1933, Berlin) was a German obstetrician and gynecologist. His father, Eduard Arnold Martin (1809–1875), was also a specialist in OB/GYN.

He studied medicine at the universities of Jena and Berlin, receiving his doctorate at the latter institution in 1870. He worked as an assistant to his father in Berlin, where he obtained his habilitation in 1876. In Berlin, he opened a private clinic that became renowned for operative gynecology. From 1899 to 1907, he served as a full professor at the University of Greifswald, where he was also appointed head of the Frauenklinik.

He is credited with developing a variety of gynecological and obstetrical surgical procedures, being especially recognized for his work involving vaginal operations. He also introduced several instruments into medicine, that included a Scheidenspekulum. With Max Saenger, he founded the publication "Monatsschrift für Geburtshilfe und Gynäkologie" in 1894.

He described isolated Fallopian tube torsion from ectopic tubal pregnancy in 1893, before J. Praeger, from Klinikum Chemnitz, published a first case of isolated Fallopian tube torsion in normal pregnancy in 1899.

== Selected works ==
- Leitfaden der operativen Geburtshülfe, 1877.
- Hand-Atlas der Gynäkologie und Geburtshülfe (2nd edition, 1878), by Eduard Arnold Martin, edited by August Eduard Martin, translated into English as "Atlas of obstetrics and gynaecology" (1880).
- Lehrbuch der Geburtshilfe, für praktische Ärzte und Studirende, 1891.
- Handbuch der Krankheiten der weiblichen Adnexorgane, 1895.
- Pathologie und Therapie der Frauenkrankheiten (4th edition 1907), with Philipp Jacob Jung, translated into English and published as "Pathology and treatment of diseases of women" (1912).

== External Sources ==
- Media related to August Eduard Martin at Wikimedia Commons
- Guide to August Eduard Martin, Illustrations of Forcepses Scrapbook circa 1800s at the University of Chicago Special Collections Research Center
- Guide to August Eduard Martin, Notes 1837 at the University of Chicago Special Collections Research Center
