= Franz Dittrich =

Austrian pathologist

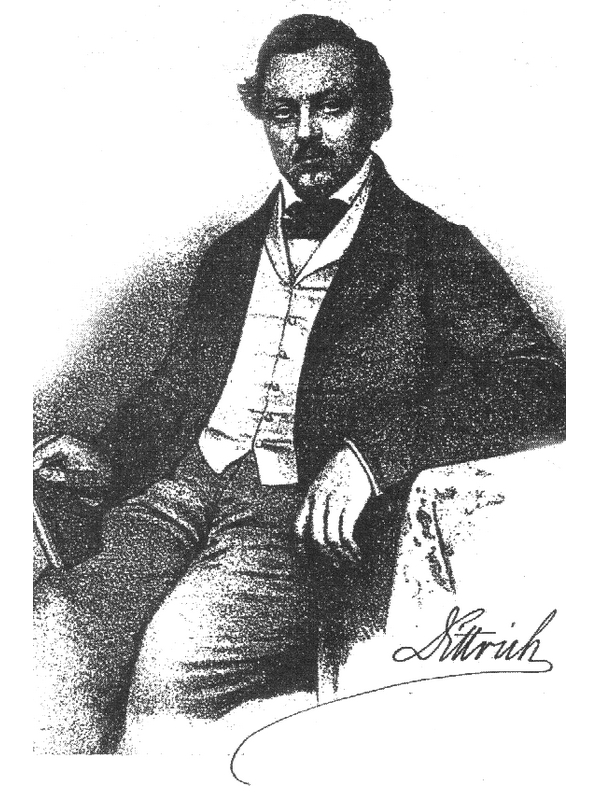
Franz Dittrich (1815–1859)

Franz Dittrich (16 October 1815 – 29 August 1859) was an Austrian pathologist born in Nixdorf, Bohemia (today Mikulášovice, Czech Republic).

He studied medicine at the University of Prague under Joseph Hyrtl (1810-1894), receiving his doctorate in 1841. He continued his studies in Vienna and in 1842 returned to Prague, where he worked as a medical assistant with Anton von Jaksch (1810-1887) and Franz Kiwisch von Rotterau (1814-1852). He later served as prosector of anatomical pathology, and in 1848 succeeded Anton Dlauhy (1807-1888) as professor of pathological anatomy. In 1850 he succeeded Karl Friedrich Canstatt (1807-1850) as director at the medical clinic in Erlangen. In 1856 Dittrich succumbed to brain disease that ultimately led to his death a few years later.

From 1845 Dittrich published reports on his activities in the Prague faculty journal, Vierteljahrsschrift für praktische Heilkunde. Topics that he covered in the journal included stomach cancer, syphilis of the liver, heart stenosis, et al. His name is associated with the following two eponyms:

- Dittrich's plugs: Minute, foul-smelling masses of bacteria, granular debris, and fatty acid crystals found in the sputum in fetid bronchitis and pulmonary gangrene.
- Dittrich's stenosis: Stenosis of the conus arteriosus.

== See also ==
- Pathology
- List of pathologists
