= Erich Franz Eugen Bracht =

German pathologist and gynecologist

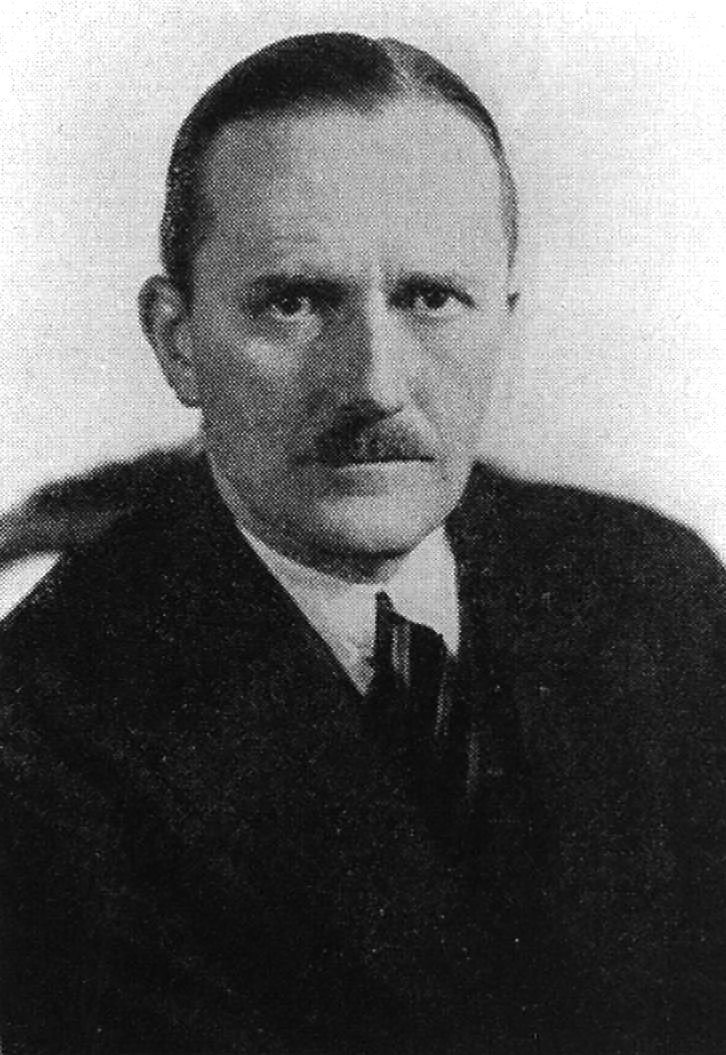
- Born: 1882; Berlin
- Died: 1969 (aged 86–87)
- Occupations: pathologist, gynaecologist
- Known for: Bracht manoeuvre

The Bracht manoeuvre

Erich Franz Eugen Bracht (5 June 1882 – 1969) was a German pathologist and gynaecologist born in Berlin.

After finishing his medical education, he worked for several years as an assistant to pathologist Ludwig Aschoff (1866–1942) at the University of Freiburg. Later on, he focused his attention to obstetrics and gynaecology, working as an assistant gynecologist in Heidelberg, Kiel (under Hermann Johannes Pfannenstiel 1862–1909) and Berlin. In 1922 he became an associate professor at the University of Berlin and eventually director of the Charité Frauenklinik. Following World War II he served as a consultant of gynaecology and obstetrics during the American occupation of Berlin.

While at Freiburg, Bracht made important contributions involving the pathological study of rheumatic myocarditis. With Hermann Julius Gustav Wächter, he described the eponymous "Bracht-Wachter bodies", defined as myocardial microabscesses seen in the presence of bacterial endocarditis.

He is also remembered for the "Bracht manoeuvre" (first described in 1935), a breech delivery that allows for delivery of the infant with minimum interference.

== Publications ==
- Beitrag zur Aetiologie und pathologischen Anatomie der Myokarditis rheumatica (pp. 493–530, 2 Abb., 2 Taf.). Dtsch. Arch. klin. Med., 96. - Leipzig 1909, (with H. Wachter).

== See also ==
- Pathology
- List of pathologists
