= Small cell (disambiguation) =

A small cell is the radio access node that make up a cellular network that has a cell size between 10 meters to 2 kilometers.

Small cell may also refer to:

- Small-cell carcinoma, a type of highly malignant cancer that most commonly arises within the lung
- Small-cell melanoma, a tumor that contains variably-sized, large nests of small melanocytes with hyperchromatic nuclei and prominent nucleoli
- B-cell chronic lymphocytic leukemia, the most common type of leukemia and a stage of small lymphocytic lymphoma

== See also ==
- Large cell
