= Eduard Arnold Martin =

German obstetrician and gynecologist

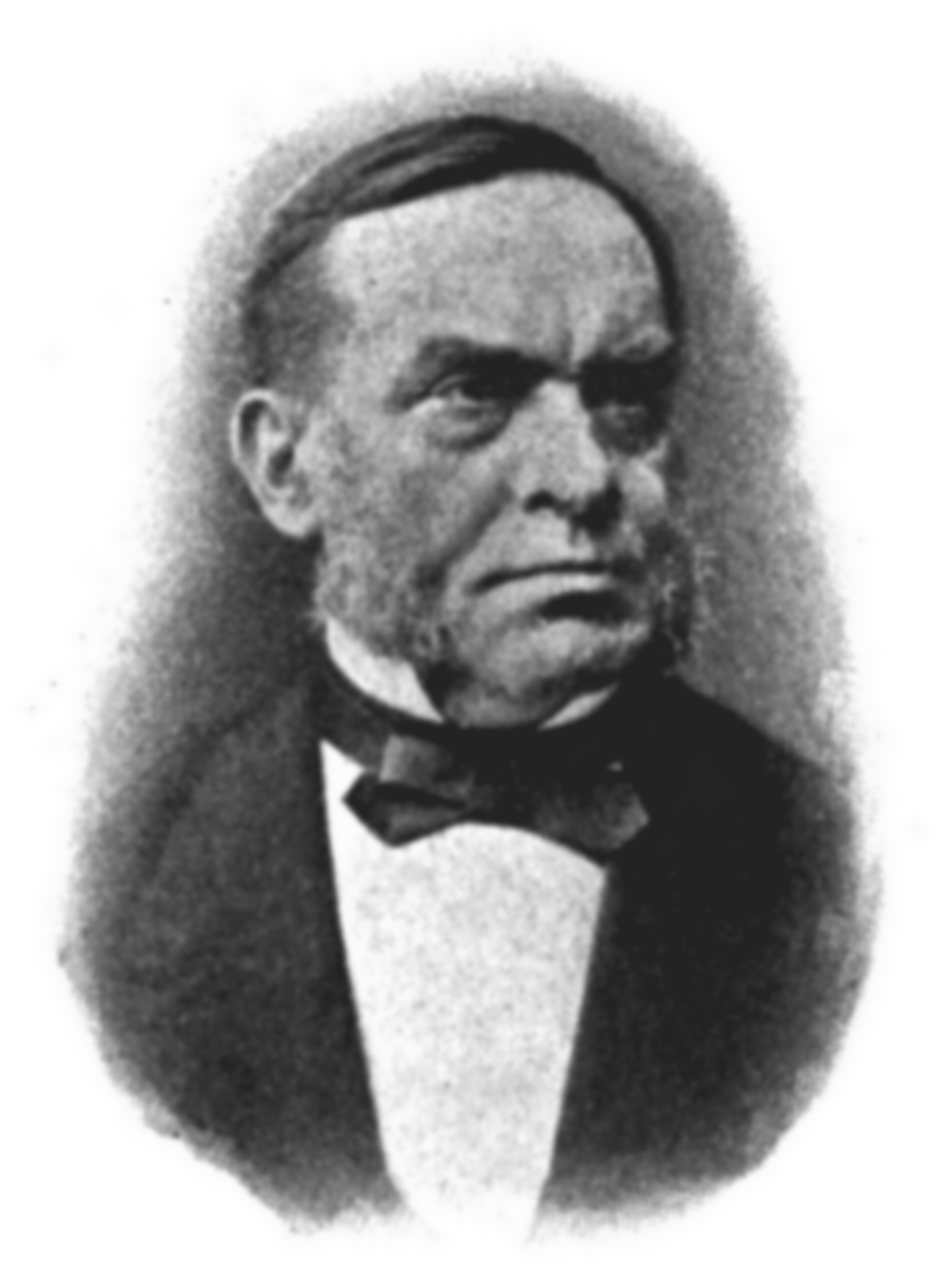
Eduard Arnold Martin

Eduard Arnold Martin (22 April 1809, Heidelberg – 5 December 1875, Berlin) was a German obstetrician and gynecologist. He was the father of medic Carl Eduard Martin (1838-1907), philologist Ernst Eduard Martin (1841-1910) and obstetrician August Eduard Martin (1847-1933).

Initially a student of law, he later studied medicine at the University of Heidelberg (1830–31), where his instructors included Maximilian Joseph von Chelius and Franz Naegele. He then continued his education at the University of Jena, and received his doctorate in 1833 at the University of Göttingen with the thesis "De lithogenesi praesertim urinaria". Following an extended study trip to Prague, Vienna, Berlin, England and France, he obtained his habilitation at Jena in 1835.

In 1837 he became an associate professor at the University of Jena, where during the following year he was named subdirector of the university maternity hospital. In 1846 he became a full professor as well as director of the maternity hospital. In 1858 he relocated to Berlin as successor to Dietrich Wilhelm Heinrich Busch as director of the maternity hospital at the Charité. At Berlin he also established a department of gynecology. Among his better known students and assistants were Robert Michaelis von Olshausen and Adolf Gusserow.

In 1873 he founded the Gynäkologische Gesellschaft (Gynecological Society) in Berlin. His "Hand-Atlas der Gynäkologie und Geburtshülfe" was later translated into English and published as: "Atlas of obstetrics and gynaecology" (1880).
