= David Dahlin =

American physician (1917-2003)

David Carl Dahlin
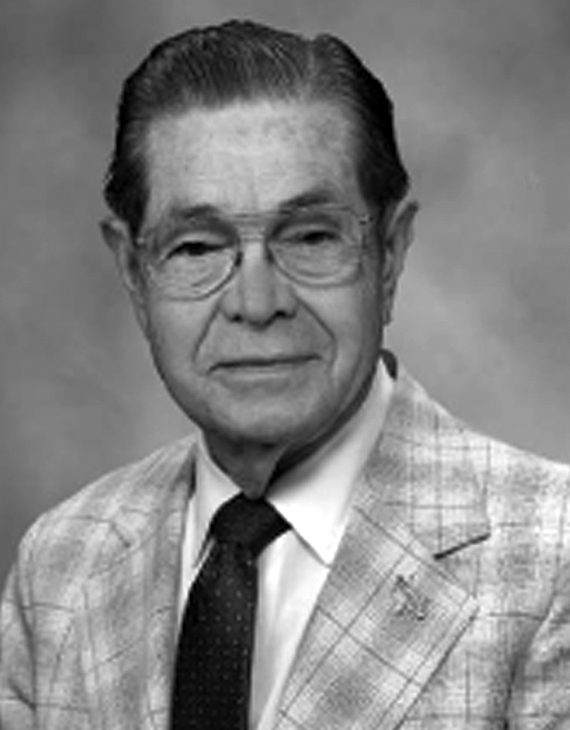
- Born: September 3, 1917; Beresford, South Dakota, U.S.
- Died: September 12, 2003 (aged 86); Rochester, Minnesota, U.S.
- Education: University of South Dakota, University of Minnesota & Rush Medical College
- Known for: Research in Surgical pathology
- Awards: Gold medal of the International Skeletal Society; Distinguished Pathologist Award of the United States & Canadian Academy of Pathology; Fred Stewart Award; Inductee into South Dakota Hall of Fame; Military awards-- Bronze star
- Scientific career
- Fields: Medicine & pathology

David Carl Dahlin, Jr. (September 3, 1917 – September 12, 2003) was a North American physician and pathologist who trained and worked at the Mayo Clinic in Rochester, Minnesota for virtually his entire career in medicine. He was internationally recognized as an expert diagnostician with regard to tumors of the musculoskeletal system—especially the bones, but was also an experienced and skilled general surgical pathologist.

== Early life and education ==
Dahlin was born in September 1917 to David and Rose Dahlin in Beresford, South Dakota. They were farmers who had little cash income; therefore, young David Jr.-- and his three brothers and sisters—learned frugality and the virtues of hard work from an early age. As a teen, an entire summer of plowing sixty-five acres with a horse-drawn plow led him to conclude that another vocation was a wise choice. Accordingly, despite the fact that the Dahlin family had virtually no money, David enrolled in the University of South Dakota in Vermillion, South Dakota. He worked his way through school, graduating magna cum laude with a B.Sc. degree in 1938.

== Medical education ==
Dahlin was accepted to Rush Medical College in Chicago, Illinois. He again worked nights throughout his time as a medical student, usually for less than 40 cents per hour. Despite this arduous schedule and the demands of school, David graduated with an M.D. in the spring of 1940. He then served as a rotating intern at Ancker General Hospital (formerly City & County Hospital) in St. Paul, Minnesota, and continued as a first-year resident in general pathology at that institution. The United States entered World War II during his Ancker pathology training experience, and Dahlin enlisted in the U.S. Army Air Corps (USAAC) in 1942.

== Military service ==
Once commissioned as an officer in the USAAC Medical Corps, Dahlin was accepted into the training program for flight surgeons. He spent his first service year in the training command in Texas and North Carolina, and was then posted to Bari, Italy, as a medical officer in the 15th Air Force. He supported the 5th Photo Reconnaissance Group, comprising P-38 fighter planes equipped with high-resolution photographic equipment. After two years overseas, Dahlin was discharged from the Army in the fall of 1945 with the rank of Major (O4), having been awarded the Bronze Star. Dahlin also held the European-African-Middle Eastern Campaign Medal and the World War II Victory Medal. He retained a keen interest in the history of the European Theater of Operations in World War II throughout the rest of his life.

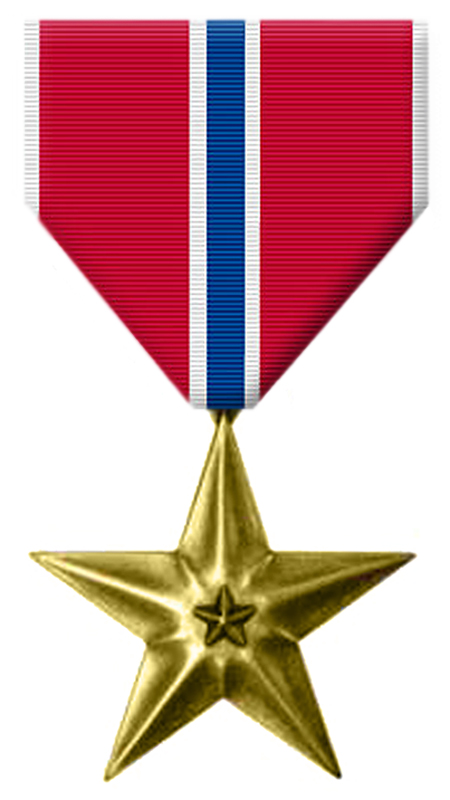
Bronze Star Medal

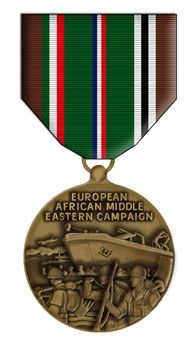
European-African-Middle Eastern Campaign Medal

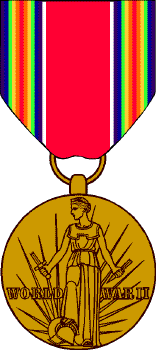
World War II Victory Medal

== Residency and early career ==
Dahlin returned to Rochester in November 1945, intending to begin residency training in general surgery. However, because of scheduling issues, he was assigned first to the surgical pathology laboratory at St. Mary's Hospital, under the tutelage of Dr. Malcolm Dockerty. Dockerty was a dynamic and gifted pathologist, whose teaching captured Dahlin's interest and loyalty. Hence, he switched his training emphasis to anatomic and clinical pathology, completing residency in 1948 and publishing his master's degree thesis (at the University of Minnesota) on systemic amyloidosis. He was then appointed to the staff of the Mayo Clinic as a consultant in pathology.

Rapidly, Dahlin became a skilled general surgical pathologist in the mold of Dockerty, but began to develop special expertise in neoplasms of the skeletal system. No one had previously studied such lesions systematically at the Mayo Clinic; indeed worldwide knowledge on that topic was then quite limited. Working with Mark Coventry, an orthopedic oncologist, Dahlin cataloged the clinical, radiographic, macroscopic, and histopathologic features of virtually all bone tumors in the Mayo archive. That undertaking eventuated in the publication of a book entitled "Bone Tumors: General Aspects and an Analysis of 2276 Cases," in 1957. That text has subsequently gone through 5 additional editions and is still in print under the editorship of Krishnan K. Unni and Carrie Inwards.

== Later career and honors ==
The publication of his book and other writings on bone tumors—eventually numbering over 200 original articles—prompted many invitations for lectureships throughout the world. Dahlin’s opinion was sought internationally on a huge number of challenging bone tumor cases, not only for advice on pathologic interpretation but clinical management as well. He served as section-head of surgical pathology at Mayo for many years, and was a Professor in the Mayo Medical School. Dahlin received a host of professional honors, including the first gold medal of the International Skeletal Society, the Distinguished Pathologist Award of the United States & Canadian Academy of Pathology, the Fred Stewart Award from Memorial Sloan-Kettering Cancer Center, the Distinguished Alumnus Award from the Mayo Clinic, and an honorary doctorate from the University of Gothenburg, Sweden. Dahlin also was the first physician inducted into the South Dakota Hall of Fame. He retired from active practice in 1983, but continued to serve as an informal consultant for some years thereafter.

== Personal life ==
Dahlin married Helen DePass in October 1941. She died of gallbladder carcinoma in March 1990 at the age of 69. The couple had three children together—Brian, Eric (1948-2005), and Martha. Dahlin was an avid sportsman, enjoying hunting, fishing, canoeing, camping, and handball.

== Death ==
In July 2003, Dahlin was interviewed for the U.S. Veterans History Project. Two months later, he contracted viral encephalitis while on a camping trip at the age of 86 and died of that illness on September 12, 2003. He is buried next to his wife and son in Rochester, Minnesota.

== See also ==
- Pathology
- List of pathologists
