= Elsbeth Steinheil =

German engineer (1893–1955)

- Born: 10 July 1893; Munich
- Died: July 27, 1955 (aged 62)
- Education: Technical University of Munich
- Known for: first German woman to graduate in mechanical engineering

Elsbeth Steinheil (married name Franz) (10 July 1893 - 27 July 1955) was the first German woman to graduate in mechanical engineering, qualifying in 1917 from the Technical University of Munich.

== Early life and education ==
Steinheil was born on 10 July 1893 in Munich, to Emmy (née von Voit) and physicist Rudolf Steinheil, the eldest of five daughters. Her maternal grandfather was physiologist and dietitian Carl von Voit, and her maternal great-grandfather was architect August von Voit.

Steinheil attended the Städtische Höhere Töchterschule in Munich, and from 1909 to 1913 she attended grammar school courses for women at a private grammar school in Munich. In 1913, she passed her Abitur (secondary education examinations) as an external student at the Wittelsbacher Gymnasium.

Steinheil then studied mechanical engineering at the Technical University of Munich. Her father encouraged her studies and her four sisters also attended university. She graduated with a degree in mechanical engineering in 1917, the first German woman to achieve this.

== Career ==
After graduating, she worked in her father's family company, "Optical-astronomic Anstalt CA Steinheil & Söhne", founded by her paternal great-grandfather Carl August von Steinheil. In 1918, she married Ludwig Franz, a graduate engineer who was chief engineer in her father's company. In 1918, in his speech at her wedding, Rudolf Steinheil said "If nowadays someone has no son but a daughter and a profession in which he needs help and a successor, then he simply lets his daughter learn the necessary things and everything is won". Elsbeth stopped working at the company shortly after she married, which disappointed her father, who lamented her "relapse into atavistic tendencies".

== Later life ==
She died in 1955.

== Commemoration ==
Hamburg University of Technology (TUHH) named a room for Steinheil in 2022, alongside ones for Elisabeth von Knobelsdorff, the first woman in Germany to earn a degree from a technical university, graduating in architecture in 1911, and Verena Wein-Wilke, who was the first woman to graduate from the TUHH, also in architecture.
