= Ellrich =

- Town
- Coat of arms

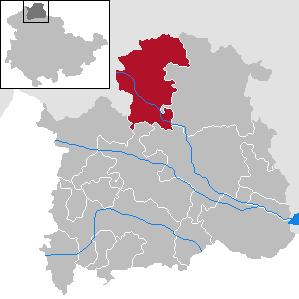
- Location of Ellrich within Nordhausen district
- Interactive map of Ellrich
- Location within Germany Location within Thuringia
- Coordinates: 51°35′8″N 10°40′5″E
- Country: Germany
- State: Thuringia
- District: Nordhausen

Government
  - Mayor (2024–30): Henry Pasenow (CDU)

Area
  - Total: 69.43 km^{2} (26.81 sq mi)
- Elevation: 255 m (837 ft)

Population (2025-12-31)
  - Total: 5,239
  - Density: 75.46/km^{2} (195.4/sq mi)
- Time zone: UTC+01:00 (CET)
  - Summer (DST): UTC+02:00 (CEST)
- Postal codes: 99755
- Dialling codes: 036332
- Vehicle registration: NDH

Ellrich (German pronunciation: [ˈɛlʁɪç]) is a town in the district of Nordhausen, in Thuringia, Germany. It is situated on the southern edge of the Harz, 13 km northwest of Nordhausen. It is the northernmost settlement in Thuringia.

== History ==
=== Second World War ===
During the Second World War, Ellrich housed two subcamps at Juliushütte and Bürgergarten of the Mittelbau-Dora concentration camp.

== Personalities ==
=== Sons and daughters of the city ===
- Wilhelm Wiegand (1851–1915), historian and archivist
- Wilhelm Apel (1905–1969), Hessian politician (SPD) and deputy of the Hessian state parliament
- Dietrich Haugk (1925–2015), film director and voice actor
- Rolf Hoppe (1930–2018), actor
