= Wilhelm Wiegand =

German archivist and historian (1851–1915)

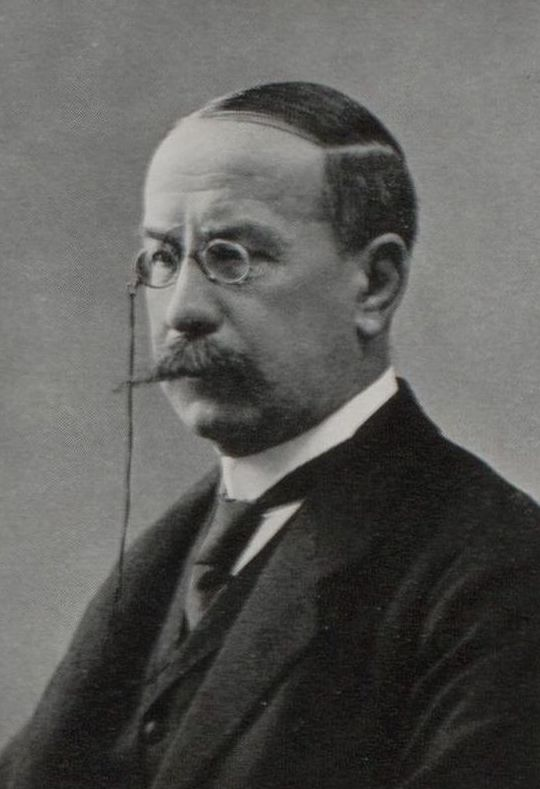
Wilhelm Wiegand

Wilhelm Wiegand (5 November 1851, Ellrich – 8 March 1915, Strasbourg) was a German archivist and historian. He is best known for his research of Alsatian history and his publications involving Frederick the Great.

In 1874 he received his doctorate at the University of Strasbourg with the dissertation-thesis Die Vorreden Friedrichs des Grossen zur "Histoire de mon temps". From 1876 he worked as an archivist for the city of Strasbourg. In 1878 he obtained his habilitation from the university with a thesis titled "Bellum Waltherianum". From 1883, with philologist Ernst Martin, he was editor of the journal "Strassburger studien; zeitschrift für geschichte, sprache und litteratur des Elsasses" (Strassburg studies; magazine on the history, language and literature of Alsace).

== Published works ==
- Urkundenbuch der Stadt Straßburg, volume 1, Urkunden u. Stadtrecht bis zum J. 1266, (1879) – Documents of the city of Strasbourg, records and legal issues up until 1266.
- Verzeichniss der in den Jahren 1870-1882 erschienenen Litteratur über das Elsass; with Ernst Martin (1883) – Directory on the literature of Alsace, 1870-1882 .
- Urkundenbuch der Stadt Straßburg, volume 2, Politische Urkunden von 1266 bis 1332, (1886) – Documents of the city of Strasbourg, political records from 1266 to 1332.
- Friedrich der Grosse im Urteil der Nachwelt. Vortrag, etc. (1888) – Frederick the Great in the judgment of posterity.
- Bezirks- und Gemeinde-Archive im Elsass (1898) – District and municipal archives in Alsace.
- Friedrich der Große, (1902, 2nd edition 1909, 3rd edition 1922) – Frederick the Great.

He was also the author of numerous biographies in the Allgemeine Deutsche Biographie.
