= Dietrich Wilhelm Heinrich Busch =

German obstetrician

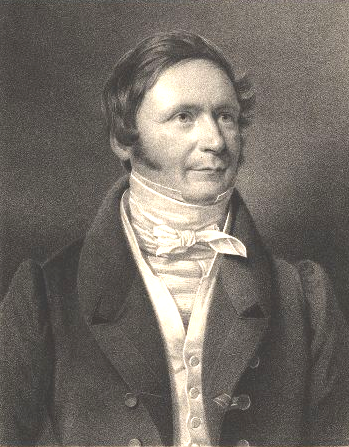
Dietrich Busch (1788-1858)

Dietrich Wilhelm Heinrich Busch (16 March 1788 – 15 March 1858) was a German obstetrician born in Marburg.

In 1806 he earned his medical doctorate at the University of Marburg, becoming an associate professor of surgery in 1814. In 1817 he was appointed professor of obstetrics at Marburg, where from 1820 to 1829 he was director of the department of obstetrics. In 1829 he succeeded Adam Elias von Siebold (1775–1828) as professor and director of the obstetrics clinic at Friedrich Wilhelm University in Berlin, serving as university rector in 1835/36. He would remain as director of the obstetrical clinic in Berlin until his death.

Among his better known students in Berlin were Carl Siegmund Franz Credé (1819–1892), Karl von Hecker (1827–1882) and Bernhard Sigmund Schultze (1827–1919). Following his death, he was succeeded in Berlin by Eduard Arnold Martin (1809–1875).

During his career he was an editor of the following journals; Gemeinsame Zeitschrift für Geburtskunde (1825–34), Neue Zeitschrift für Geburtskunde (1834–53) and Monatsschrift für Geburtskunde (1853–58).

== Selected publications ==
- Lehrbuch der Geburtskunde (1829); several editions - Textbook of obstetrics.
- Die theoretische und practische geburtskunde durch abbildungen erläutert, (1838) - Theoretical and practical obstetrics explained through pictures.
- Das Geschlechtsleben des Weibes in physiologischer, pathologischer und therapeutischer Hinsicht, five volumes (1839–44) - Female sexuality based on physiological, pathological and therapeutic aspects.
- Atlas geburtshülflicher Abbildungen, mit Bezugnahme auf das Lehrbuch der Geburtskunde, (1841)
- Handbuch der Geburtskunde in alphabetischer Ordnung, four volumes w/A. Moser (1840–43) - Handbook of obstetrics, alphabetically.
