= Emil Ponfick =

German pathologist

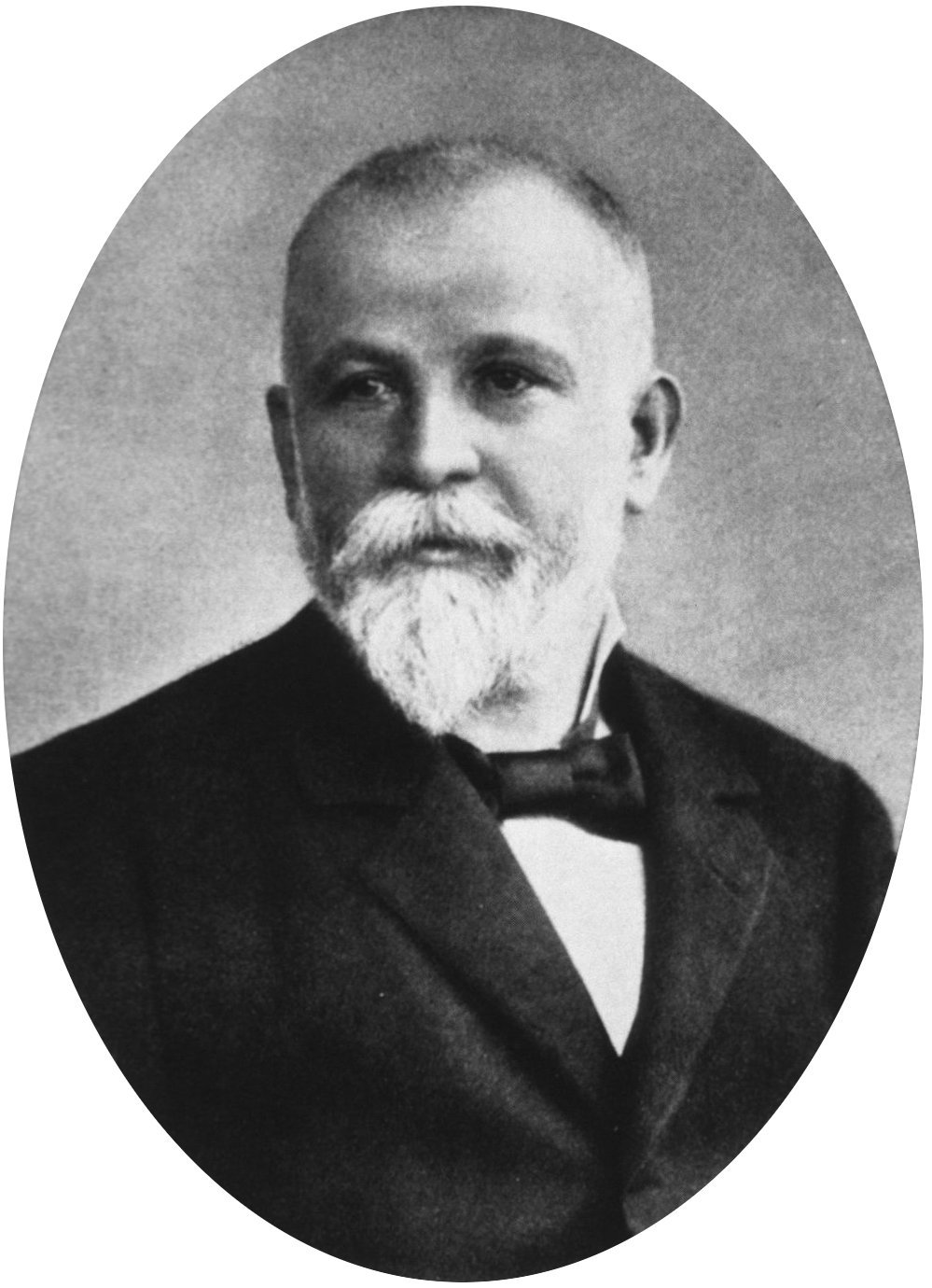
- Born: 3 November 1844; Frankfurt am Main
- Died: November 3, 1913 (aged 69); Breslau
- Education: University of Heidelberg
- Known for: Research on actinomycosis and myxedema
- Scientific career
- Fields: Pathology

Emil Ponfick (3 November 1844 – 3 November 1913) was a German pathologist born in Frankfurt am Main.

In 1867 he received his medical doctorate from the University of Heidelberg, and later was an assistant to Friedrich Daniel von Recklinghausen (1833–1910) at Würzburg, and to Rudolf Virchow (1821–1902) in Berlin. Afterwards, he succeeded Theodor Ackermann (1825–1896) as professor of pathology at Rostock (1873), followed by professorships at Göttingen (from 1876) Breslau (from 1878), where he replaced Julius Friedrich Cohnheim (1839–1884) as director of the pathological institute. He remained at the University of Breslau until his death in 1913.

Ponfick is remembered for his pioneer research of actinomycosis, and his recognition of the causative role Actinomyces played in human actinomycosis. He is credited with establishing the unity of human and bovine forms of the disease. In 1882 he published Die Actinomykose des Menschen, eine neue Infectionskrankheit (Actinomycosis of humans, a new infectious disease) in regards to the disease. He also made significant contributions in his research of myxedema, writing two articles on the disorder, Myxoedem und Hypophysis (Myxedema and hypophysis) and Zur Lehre vom Myxoedem (The doctrine of myxedema).

In 1874, Ponfick warned the Association of Baltic Physicians about the dangers of animal-to-human blood transfusions (xenotransfusion). This warning was based on empirical experience: a patient had died after receiving blood from a sheep. The following year physiologist Leonard Landois (1837–1902) from the University of Greifswald backed up Ponfick's findings with statistical data on the dangers of xenotransfusion.

== Principal writings ==
- Die Actinomykose des Menschen, eine neue Infectionskrankheit. Monograph, Berlin, 1882.
- Topographischer Atlas der medizinisch-chirurgischen Diagnostik. Jena, 1901
- Untersuchungen über die exsudative Nierenentzündung. Text and atlas. Jena, 1914.
