= Eduard Kaufmann =

German physician

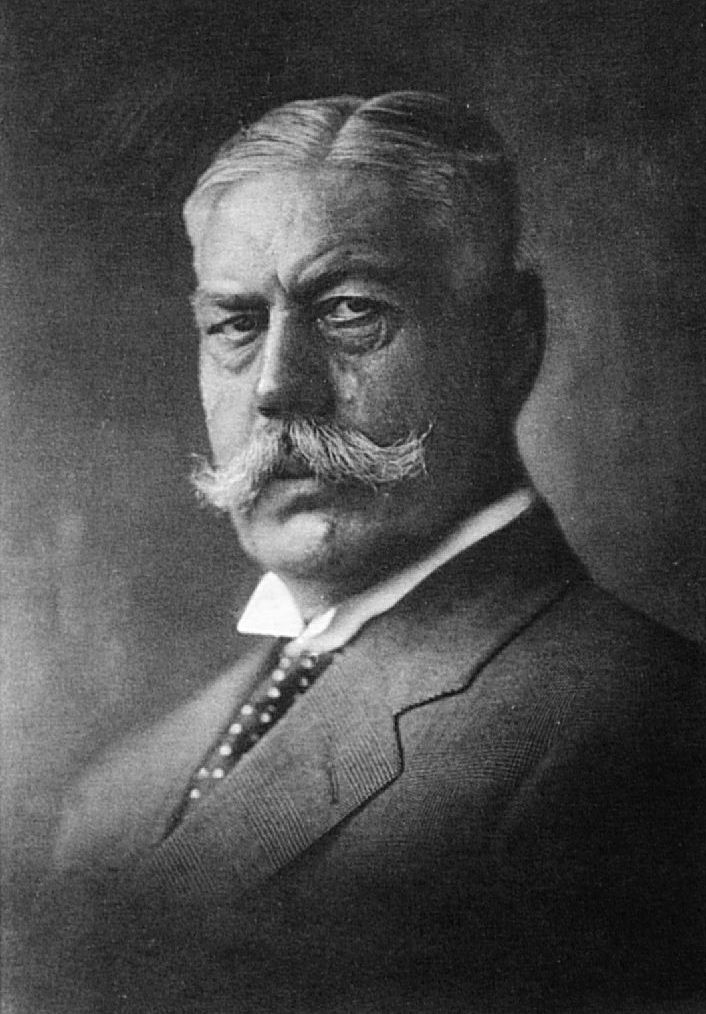
Eduard Kaufmann

Eduard Kaufmann (24 March 1860, Bonn – 15 December 1931, Göttingen) was a German physician.

The disease Abderhalden–Kaufmann–Lignac syndrome is named for him.

== Career ==
Kaufmann studied in Bonn and Berlin, and earned his doctorate from the University of Bonn in 1884. He was appointed Privatdozent for anatomical pathology in Breslau three years later, and assisted at Emil Ponfick’s institute.

In 1896 Kaufmann became prosector at Allerheiligenhospital in Breslau and professor in 1897. In 1898 he became professor of pathology and anatomical pathology and head of the Pathological Anatomical Institute of the University of Basel. Kaufmann moved in 1907 to Göttingen and finally withdrew from active work in 1927.

Kaufmann undertook the first study of cartilage changes in achondroplasia. His first textbook was in pathological anatomy, titled "Lehrbuch der speciellen pathologischen Anatomie". He was the author of significant works involving chondrodystrophy and on malignant tumors of the prostate.
