= Carl von Voit =

German physiologist and dietitian

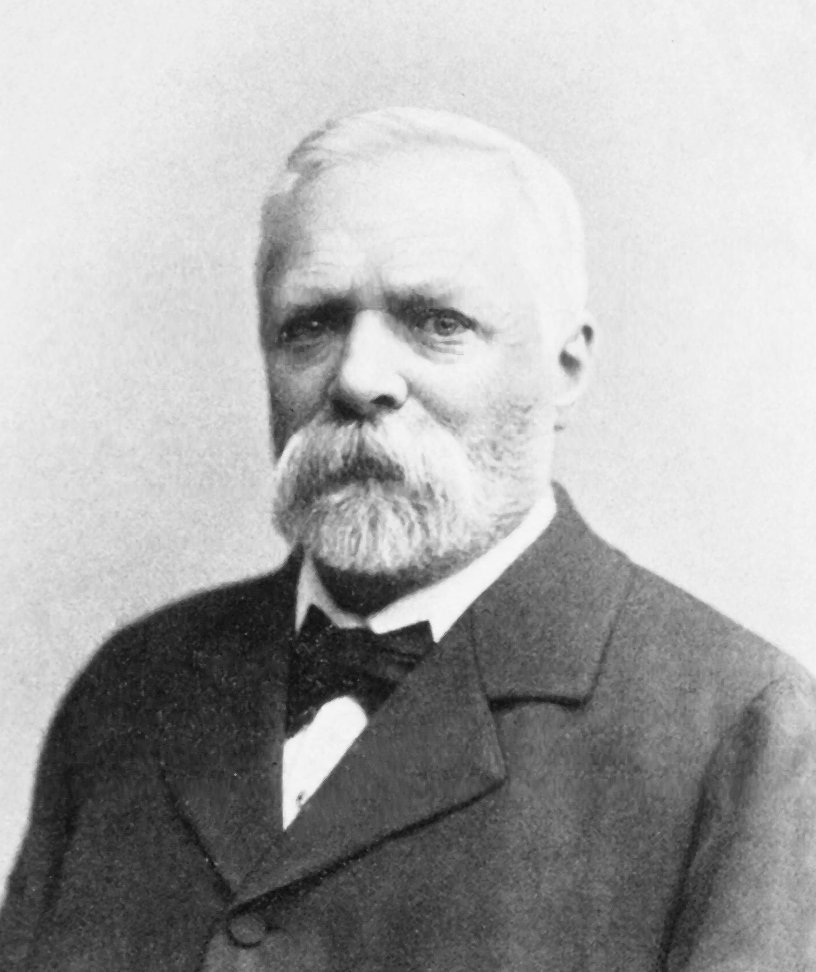
- Carl von Voit
- Born: 31 October 1831; Amberg
- Died: 31 January 1908 (aged 76); Munich, German Empire
- Education: Ludwig-Maximilians-Universität München
- Known for: dietetics
- Scientific career
- Fields: physiology

Carl von Voit (31 October 1831 – 31 January 1908) was a German physiologist and dietitian.

== Biography ==
Voit was born in Amberg, the son of August von Voit and Mathilde Burgett. From 1848 to 1854, he studied at the Ludwig-Maximilians-Universität München and the University of Würzburg. At the Ludwig-Maximilians-Universität München, his teachers were Justus von Liebig and Max Joseph Pettenkofer, and at the University of Würzburg, he was a pupil of Albert von Kölliker. In 1855, he furthered his education at the University of Göttingen under chemist Friedrich Wohler, and in 1856/57 served as an assistant to Theodor von Bischoff at the Ludwig-Maximilians-Universität München. In 1857, he obtained his habilitation, and from 1863 was a full professor of physiology, as well as curator of the physiological collection at the Ludwig-Maximilians-Universität München.

== Contributions ==
Carl von Voit is considered by many to be the "father" of modern dietetics. As a chemist and physiologist, he found that the amount of nitrogen in excreted urea is a measure for the protein turnover. Using a respiration calorimeter, he could measure the contribution of individual nutrients, known as Voitsche Kostmaß. Around 1860, the chemist and physiologist investigated metabolic balances alongside Max von Pettenkofer. The two Munich scientists demonstrated that living organisms are primarily composed of the organic compounds proteins, fats, and carbohydrates, and require these for nutrition. Using a respiration chamber, he was able to further characterize the significance of individual nutrients for human nutrition and established the Voit nutritional standard. He determined the average daily ration of an adult laborer to be 3000 kcal.

Voit was also highly successful as a teacher; the "Munich School" of nutritional science attracted students worldwide. In particular, the early development of nutritional science in the United States was deeply shaped here. In Germany, Max Rubner was Voit's most famous student. Other students included Otto Frank and Hermann von Tappeiner. The research of Voit and Rubner also had a major influence on the work of Wilbur Olin Atwater.

== Personal life ==
In 1860, Voit married Laura von Hößlin (1831-1910) in Augsburg. She was the younger sister of his stepmother Ottilie. They had six children Karoline (born in 1862), Friedrich (1863–1944), Emilie (1864-1903; married name Steinheil), Bertha (b. 1866), Louise Auguste (born in 1868) and Johanna (born in 1870). His granddaughter via Emilie was Elsbeth Steinheil, the first German woman to graduate in mechanical engineering, qualifying in 1917 from the Technical University of Munich.

Carl von Voit died in Munich on 31 January 1908.

The German Nutrition Society has been awarding the Carl-von-Voit-medal since 1961.

== Works ==
- Die Gesetze der Ernährung des Fleischfressers (Leipzig 1860)
- Über die Wirkung des Kochsalzes, des Kaffees und der Muskelbewegung auf den Stoffwechsel (Munich 1860)
- Über die Kost in öffentlichen Anstalten (Munich 1876)
- Untersuchung der Kost in einigen öffentlichen Anstalten (Munich 1877)
- Über die Entwickelung der Erkenntnis (Munich 1879)
- Physiologie des allgemeinen Stoffwechsels und der Ernährung (volume 6, first section of Ludimar Hermann's "Handbuch der Physiologie", Leipzig 1881)
- Zeitschrift für Biologie (as publisher, together with Ludwig von Buhl und Max von Pettenkofer)
