= Ernst Martin =

German philologist (1841–1910)

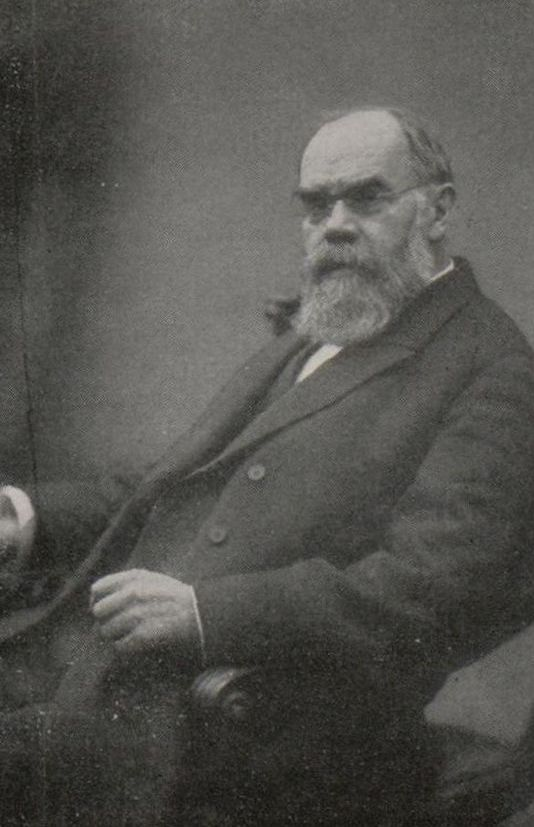
Ernst Martin (August 1910)

Ernst Eduard Martin (5 May 1841 in Jena – 13 August 1910 in Strasbourg) was a German philologist of Romance and Germanic studies. He was the son of gynecologist Eduard Arnold Martin (1809–1875).

He studied at the universities of Jena, Berlin and Bonn, obtaining his habilitation in 1866 at the University of Heidelberg. Later on, he worked as a professor at the universities of Freiburg, Prague (from 1874) and Strasbourg (from 1877). Beginning in 1883, with Wilhelm Wiegand, he was editor of the journal "Strassburger studien; Zeitschrift für geschichte, sprache und litteratur des Elsasses".

== Selected works ==
- Bermerkungen zur Kudrun, 1867 – Remarks about Kudrun.
- Goethe in Strassburg, 1871 – Goethe in Strassburg.
- Kudrun (1872, second edition 1902).
- Fergus; roman von Guillaume le Clerc, 1872 – Guillaume le Clerc's Roman de Fergus.
- Mittelhochdeutsche Grammatik (12th edition, 1892) – Middle High German grammar.
- Das niederländische Volksbuch Reynaert de Vos, 1876 – The Dutch chapbook involving Reinaert de Vos.
- Hermann von Sachsenheim, 1878 – On German poet Hermann von Sachsenheim (died 1458).
- Elsässische litteraturdenkmäler aus dem XIV-XVII. Jahrhundert (with Erich Schmidt), 1878 – Alsatian literature monuments from the 14th to 17th centuries.
- Geschichte der deutschen litteratur, (new edition of Wilhelm Wackernagel's history of German literature, 1879–94).
- Der Goethehügel bei Sesenheim, 1880 – The Goethehügel at Sessenheim.
- Le Roman de Renart, 1882 – The epic of Reynard.
- Wolframs von Eschenbach Parzival und Titurel, 1900 – Wolfram von Eschenbach's Parzival und Titurel.
- Der Versbau des Heliand und der altsächsischen Genesis, 1907 – The versification of Heliand and the Old Saxon Genesis.
