= Small-cell melanoma =

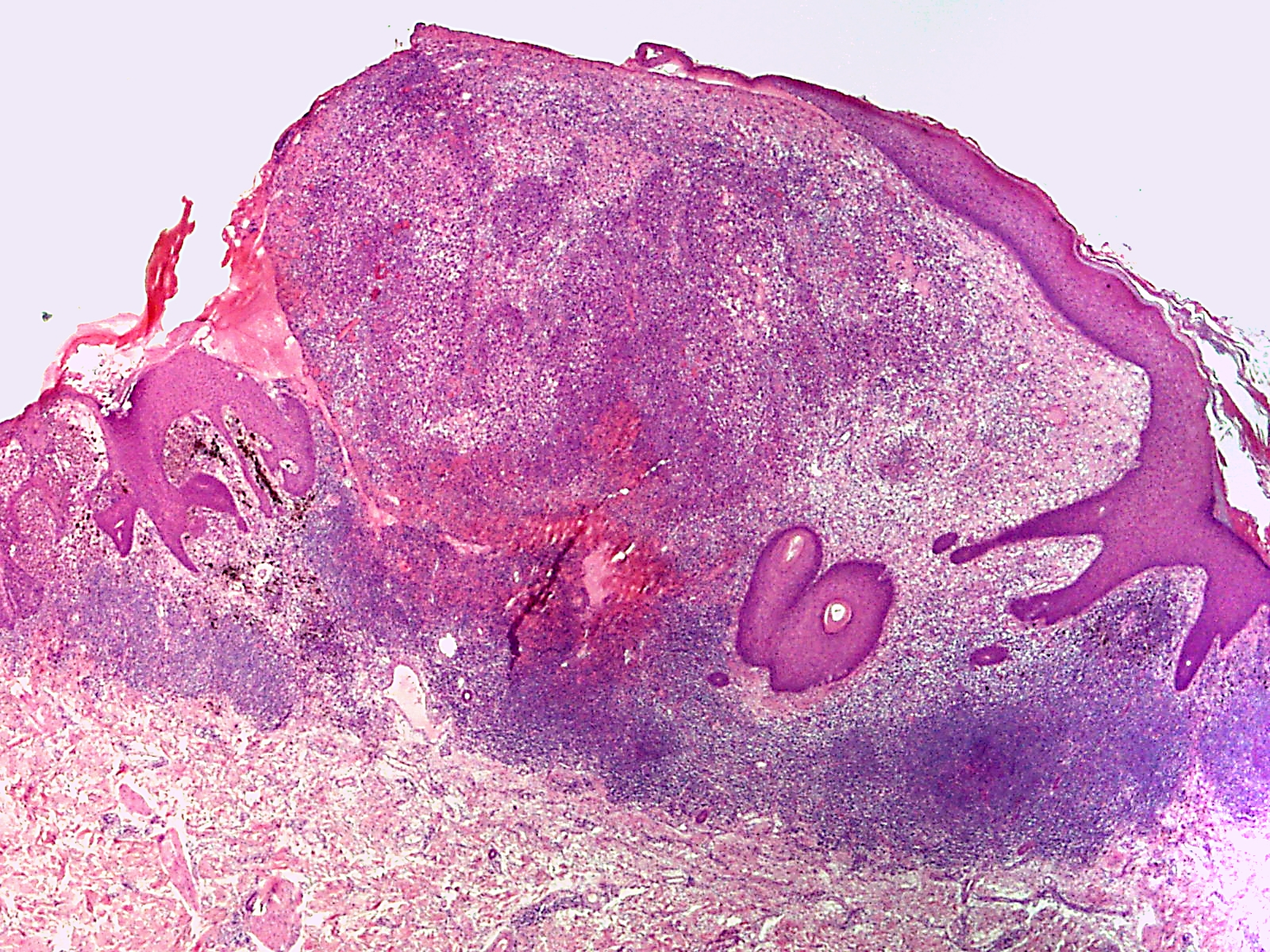
Small-cell melanoma

Small-cell melanoma, also known as melanoma with small nevus-like cells, is a cutaneous condition, a tumor that contains variably-sized, large nests of small melanocytes with hyperchromatic nuclei and prominent nucleoli.

== See also ==
- Melanoma with features of a Spitz nevus
- List of cutaneous conditions
