= Ferdinand Adolf Kehrer =

German gynecologist (1837–1914)

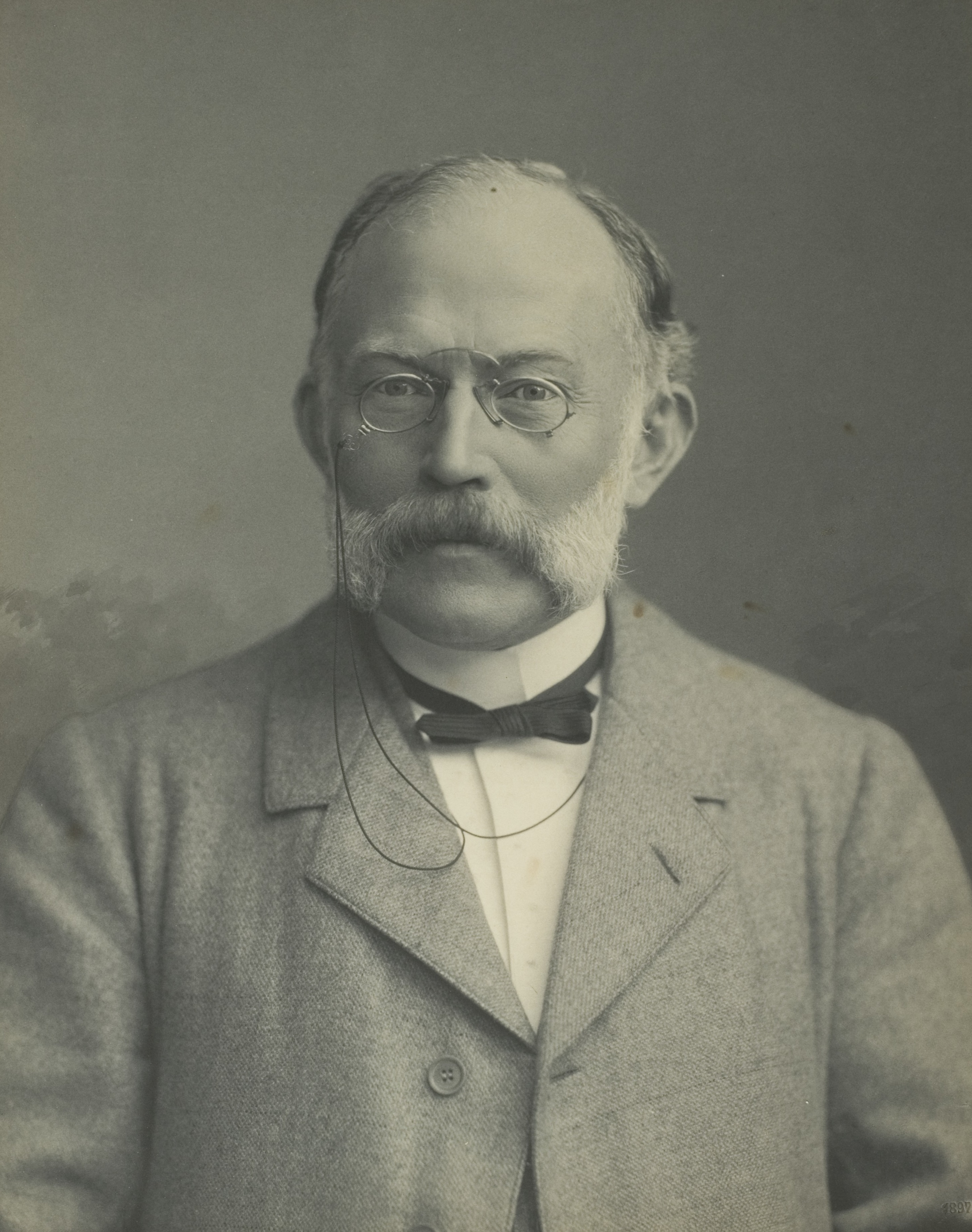
- Born: 16 February 1837
- Died: 16 June 1914 (aged 77)
- Occupation: Gynecologist

Signature
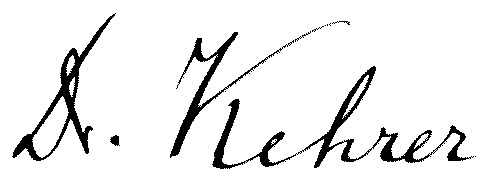

Ferdinand Adolf Kehrer (16 February 1837 – 16 June 1914) was a German gynecologist who was a native of Guntersblum in Rhenish Hesse. He was the father of Ferdinand Adalbert Kehrer (1883–1966), a neurologist and Hugo Ludwig Kehrer (1876-1967), a German art historian.

He studied medicine at the University of Giessen under Ferdinand von Ritgen (1787–1867), at the Ludwig-Maximilians-Universität München with Karl von Hecker (1827–1882), and the University of Vienna under Karl von Braun-Fernwald (1822–1891). From 1872 to 1881, he was a "full professor" of obstetrics at the University of Giessen, where he also served as director of the Frauenklinik. In 1881, he relocated to Heidelberg University as chair of gynecology.

Kehrer is remembered for performing the first modern Caesarean section in 1881. It involved a transverse incision of the lower segment of the uterus, a procedure that minimizes bleeding, and is still widely used today, typically in form of the Pfannenstiel incision, a modification made by Hermann Johannes Pfannenstiel in 1900.

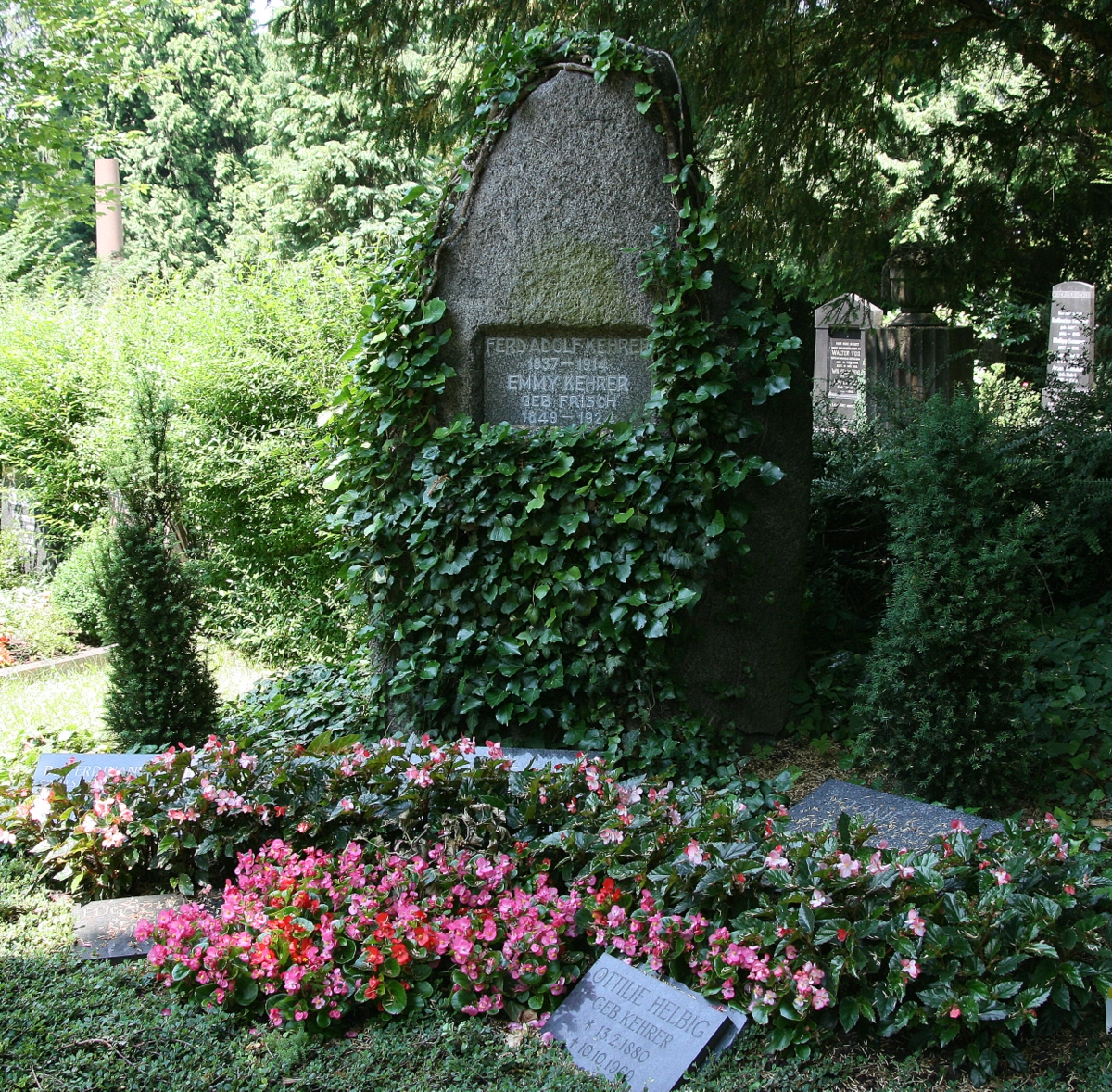
His grave in Heidelberg

On 25 September 1881, in the town of Meckesheim, he performed the first modern C-section. The patient was a 26-year-old woman, and the operation proved to be a success. Prior to Kehrer's operation, Caesarean sections were seldom performed, and when they were, the mortality rate of mothers was very high. The following year, Max Sanger (1853–1903), introduced the practice of suturing the uterus' Caesarean wound.

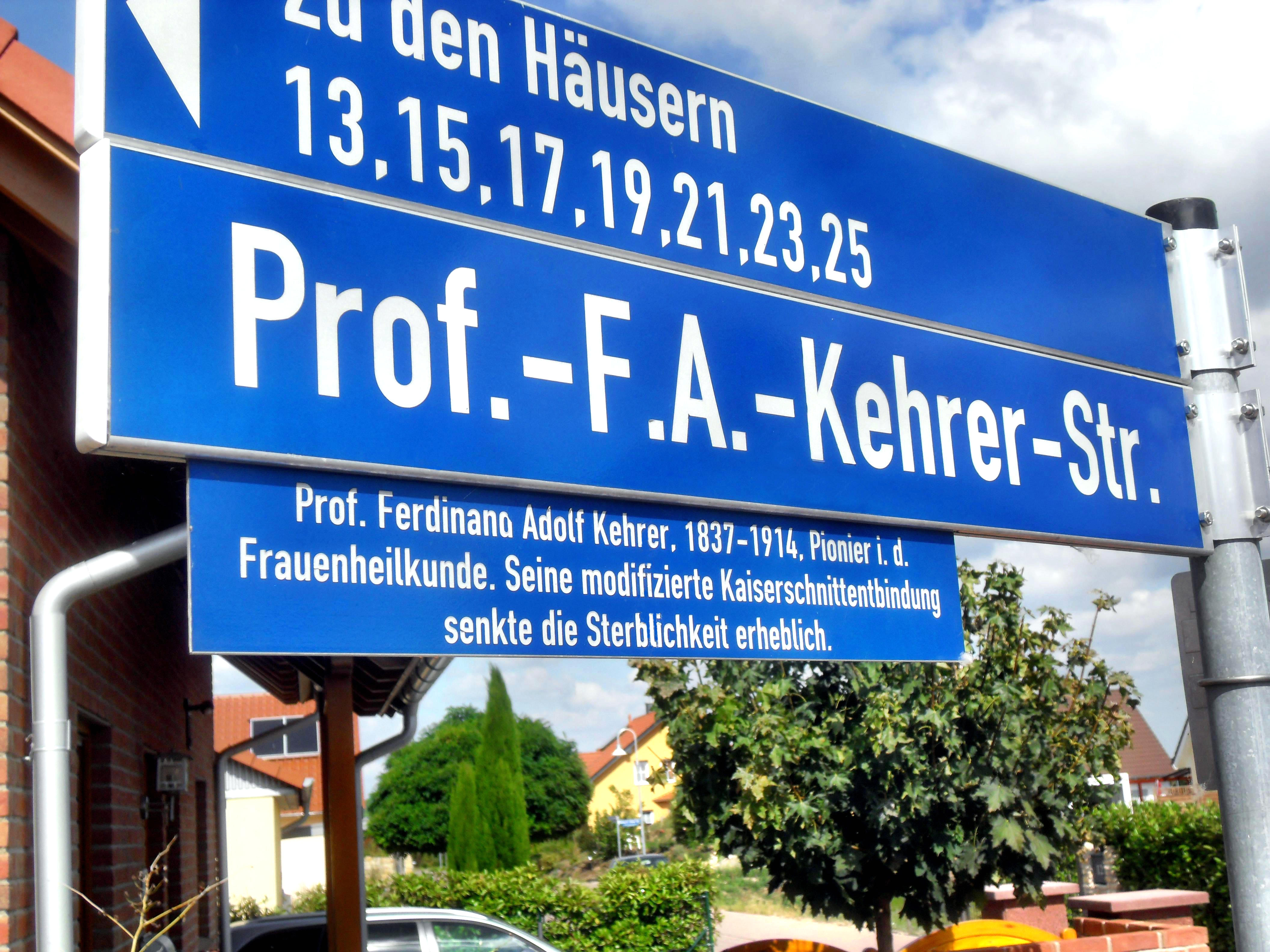
Street sign in Guntersblum

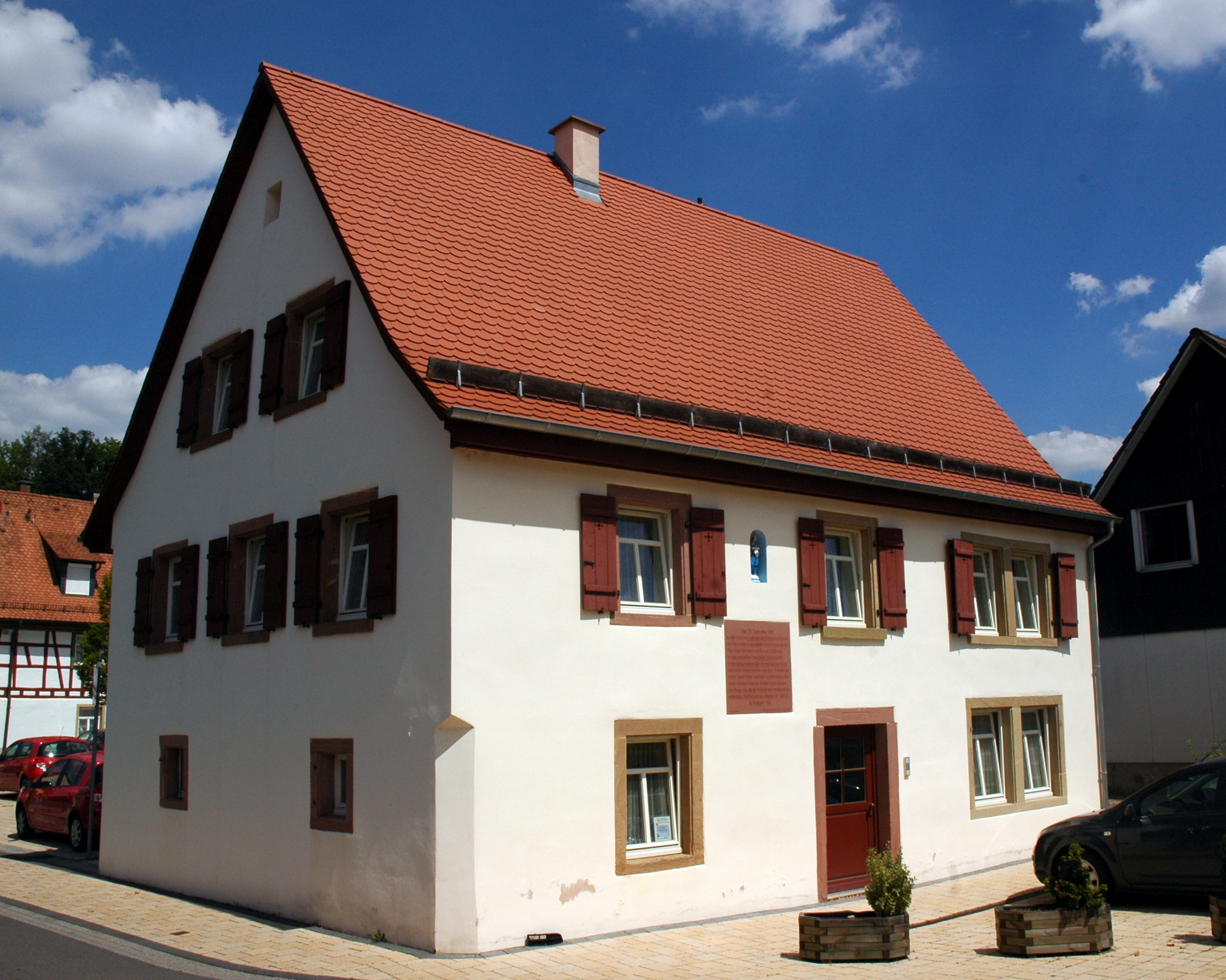
Meckesheim house, where Adolf Kehrer performed his first caesarean section

He died in Heidelberg.

== Selected publications ==
- Die Geburten in Schädellagen mit rückwärts gerichtetem Hinterhaupt, (dissertation- Giessen 1860)
- Lehrbuch der Geburtshilfe für Hebammen, (Textbook of midwifery for midwives), 1880 and 1891
- Ueber den Soorpilz– Pulscurve im Wochenbett, (Heidelberg 1883)
- Physiologie und Pathologie des Wochenbetts, (Physiology and pathology of the puerperium), in Volumes I and III of P. Müller's Handbuch der Geburtshülfe (1888–89)
- Lehrbuch der operativen Geburtshilfe, (Textbook of operative obstetrics), 1891.
