= Elisabeth von Knobelsdorff =

German engineer (1877–1959)

- Born: 17 June 1877
- Died: 20 April 1959 (aged 81)
- Education: TH Charlottenburg
- Occupation: Architect
- Practice: master builder for the government

Elisabeth von Knobelsdorff (17 June 1877 – 20 April 1959) was a German engineer and architect.

== Early life ==
She was born on 17 June 1877 in Potsdam. Her parents were the Major General Heinrich Wilhelm Kurt von Knobelsdorff and Marie Elizabeth Fancis Gertrud Dyhrenfurth.

== Education ==
In 1906, Elisabeth von Knobelsdorff graduated from the real school in Munich. In 1907, she began studying architecture at the TH Charlottenburg, first as a guest student, after the admission of women at the universities in the Kingdom of Prussia in 1909. She finished her studies in 1911, as the first woman in Germany with the diploma in engineering.

== Career ==
In 1912, she became the first female member of the Association of Architects and Engineers in Berlin (AIV) and took part in the exhibition "The Woman in Home and Work", a showcase of the women's movement. The organisers of this exhibition included her aunt Gertrud Dyrenfurth, who lived on the estate of the family near Wrocław.

In World War I, she worked as a "field architect in the rank of lieutenant" in the military building administration in Doberitz near Potsdam, and at the German Army High Command in occupied Belgium. After World War I, she worked as an architect at the provincial government in Potsdam. In 1921, she passed the state examination for the building authority, and was again appointed as the first woman in Germany, master builder for the government.

In 1922, she married Kurt Wilhelm Viktor von Tippelskirch, Legation manager in the Foreign Office, and was then released in 1923 (as married) from the civil service. She then worked freelance as an architect in Berlin-Charlottenburg, until she accompanied her husband to the United States in 1927.

After returning in 1938, the couple lived in Silesia, from where she was expelled at the end of World War II. Elisabeth von Knobelsdorff lived in Bassum near Bremen from 1946 until her death on 20 April 1959.

== Commemoration ==
Hamburg University of Technology (TUHH) named a room for Elisabeth von Knobelsdorff in 2022, alongside ones for Elsbeth Steinheil the first woman mechanical engineering graduate in Germany, and Verena Wein-Wilke, who was the first woman to graduate from the TUHH, in architecture.
