= Hugo Kehrer =

German art historian (1876–1967)

Hugo Ludwig Kehrer (27 April 1876 – 3 January 1967) was a German art historian.

== Life ==
Hugo Kehrer was born on 27 April 1876 in Giessen, the son of gynecologist Ferdinand Adolf Kehrer and Emmy (1849–1924), née Frisch, daughter of the Darmstadt animal painter Friedrich Frisch. After graduating from high school in Heidelberg, Kehrer initially pursued a career as an army officer and attended the Danzig Military Academy. After graduating, he served as an officer in a Baden Grenadier Regiment until 1901.

In 1900, he switched careers and began studying art history, Protestant theology, and philosophy at Heidelberg University under Henry Thode, Kuno Fischer, Friedrich von Duhn, Karl Neumann, Adalbert Merx, and Ernst Troeltsch, before receiving his doctorate in 1903. In 1904, Kehrer passed his first theological examination at the University of Karlsruhe. He then continued his studies at the Marburg University under Hermann Cohen and Paul Natorp in the same year, and finally, from 1905 to 1908, at the University of Strasbourg under Georg Dehio, Adolf Michaelis, and Johannes Ficker. After further studies at the Friedrich Wilhelm University of Berlin, he qualified as a professor at the Ludwig-Maximilians-Universität München in 1909 on the recommendation of Heinrich Wölfflin, publishing his work on "The Three Magi in Literature and Art" (2 volumes, 1908), which remains fundamental to this day. He subsequently stayed in Rome until 1910 on a travelling scholarship from the German Archaeological Institute.

Kehrer's first of thirteen trips to Spain took place in 1909, beginning the decisive impact of Spanish art on his academic career. From 1911 to 1912/13, he taught art history at the Women's Academy of the Munich Artists' Association. Finally, from 1915 to 1945, he taught as an associate professor of Medieval and Modern Art History at the Ludwig-Maximilians-Universität München.

Kehrer joined the Nazi Party (NSDAP) on 1 May 1933 (membership number 1929687). ). He dedicated his 1938 study, "Greco as a Figure of Mannerism," to "the glorious liberator of Spain," General Francisco Franco.

In Munich in 1919, Kehrer married Katharina Knauer (1885-1966), who was the daughter of Ernst Wilhelm Christian Knauer, which union produced a daughter and a son. He died in Munich on 3 January 1967 at the age of 90.

== Work ==
Hugo Kehrer was one of the discoverers of El Greco in his ‘’(1912 Special College)’’ and, along with August Liebmann Mayer, one of the most important interpreters of Spanish painting, enjoying international renown as a connoisseur. His writings are distinguished by their vividness, based on his intuitive grasp of the artistry and remarkable use of language, as well as by their clear vision and succinct historiographic analysis.

== Selected publications ==
- Die gotischen Wandmalereien in der Kaiser-Pfalz zu Forchheim. Ein Beitrag zur Ursprungsfrage der fränkischen Malerei (= Abhandlungen der Bayerischen Akademie der Wissenschaften. Philosophisch-Philologische und Historische Klasse. 26, 3, ZDB-ID 209997-4). Verlag der Königlich Bayerischen Akademie der Wissenschaften, München 1912.
- Die Kunst des Greco. Schmidt, München 1914, (3., vermehrte Auflage. ebenda 1920).
- Alt-Antwerpen. Eine kunsthistorische Studie. Schmidt, München 1917.
- Francisco de Zurbarán. Schmidt, München 1918.
- Peter Paul Rubens. Mit 80 Abbildungen, Briefen des Künstlers und seiner Schrift „Über die Nachahmung antiker Statuen“. Schmidt, München 1919.
- Velázques. Schmidt, München 1919.
- Neues über Francisco de Zurbarán. In: Zeitschrift für bildende Kunst. Bd. 55, Nr. 11, 1919/1920, S. 248–251.
- als Herausgeber: Francisco de Goya: Los Desastres de la Guerra. 82 Faksimile-Wiedergaben in Kupfertiefdruck nach den Vorzugsdrucken des Kupferstichkabinetts in Berlin. Schmidt, München 1921, (Faksimile-Ausgabe in 500 nummerierten Exemplaren).
- als Herausgeber: Francisco de Goya: Tauromachia. 43 Faksimile-Wiedergaben in Kupfertiefdruck. Schmidt, München 1923, (Faksimile-Ausgabe in 500 nummerierten Exemplaren).
- Über Artus Quellin den Jüngeren. In: Paul Clemen (Hrsg.): Belgische Kunstdenkmäler. Band 2: Vom Anfang des sechzehnten bis zum Ende des achtzehnten Jahrhunderts. Bruckmann, München 1923, S. 259–280.
- Spanischer Barock. In: Festschrift Heinrich Wölfflin. Beiträge zur Kunst- und Geistesgeschichte. Zum 21. Juni 1924 überreicht von Freunden und Schülern. Schmidt, München 1924, S. 233–243.
- Spanische Kunst von Greco bis Goya. Schmidt, München 1926.
- Koepfe des Velázquez. In: Estudios eruditos in memoriam de Adolfo Bonilla y San Martín. (1875–1926). Band 2. Ratés, Madrid 1930, S. 369–374.
- Dürers Selbstbildnisse und die Dürer-Bildnisse. Mann, Berlin 1934.
- Franz von Lenbach. 100 Jahre Wesen und Welt. Neuer Filser-Verlag, München 1937.
- Greco als Gestalt des Manierismus. Neuer Filser-Verlag, München 1939.
- Der Prado in Madrid. In: Atlantis (Zeitschrift)|Atlantis. Jg. 11, Heft 9, 1939, ZDB-ID 211777-0, S. 497–504.
- Ein neuer Greco. In: Pantheon. Jg. 13, Bd. 26, Nr. 11, 1940, ISSN 0031-0999, S. 250–252.
- Deutschland in Spanien. Beziehung, Einfluß und Abhängigkeit. Callwey, München 1953, (Auch in spanischer Übersetzung).
- Grecos La Veronica con la Santa Faz, eine Neuerwerbung der Bayerischen Staatsgemäldesammlungen. In: Die Kunst und das schöne Heim. Bd. 52, Nr. 7, 1954, S. 241–243.
- Einführung in: El Greco. Dominikos Theotokópulos. (1541–1614) (= Welt in Farben.). Desch, München u. a. 1953.
- Einführung in: Diego Velazquez. (1599–1660) (= Welt in Farben.). Desch, München u. a. 1954.
- Greco in Toledo. Höhe und Vollendung 1577–1614. Kohlhammer, Stuttgart 1960.
- Die Meninas des Velázquez. Bruckmann, München 1966.
- Esencia y sentido del arte de Velázquez. In: Varia Velázqueña. Homenaje a Velazquez en el III centenario de su muerte. 1660–1960. Band 1: Estudios sobre Velazquez y su obra. Ministerio de Educacion Nacional – Direccion General de Bellas Artes, Madrid 1960, S. 34–37.
