= Julius Friedrich Cohnheim =

German-Jewish pathologist (1839–1884)

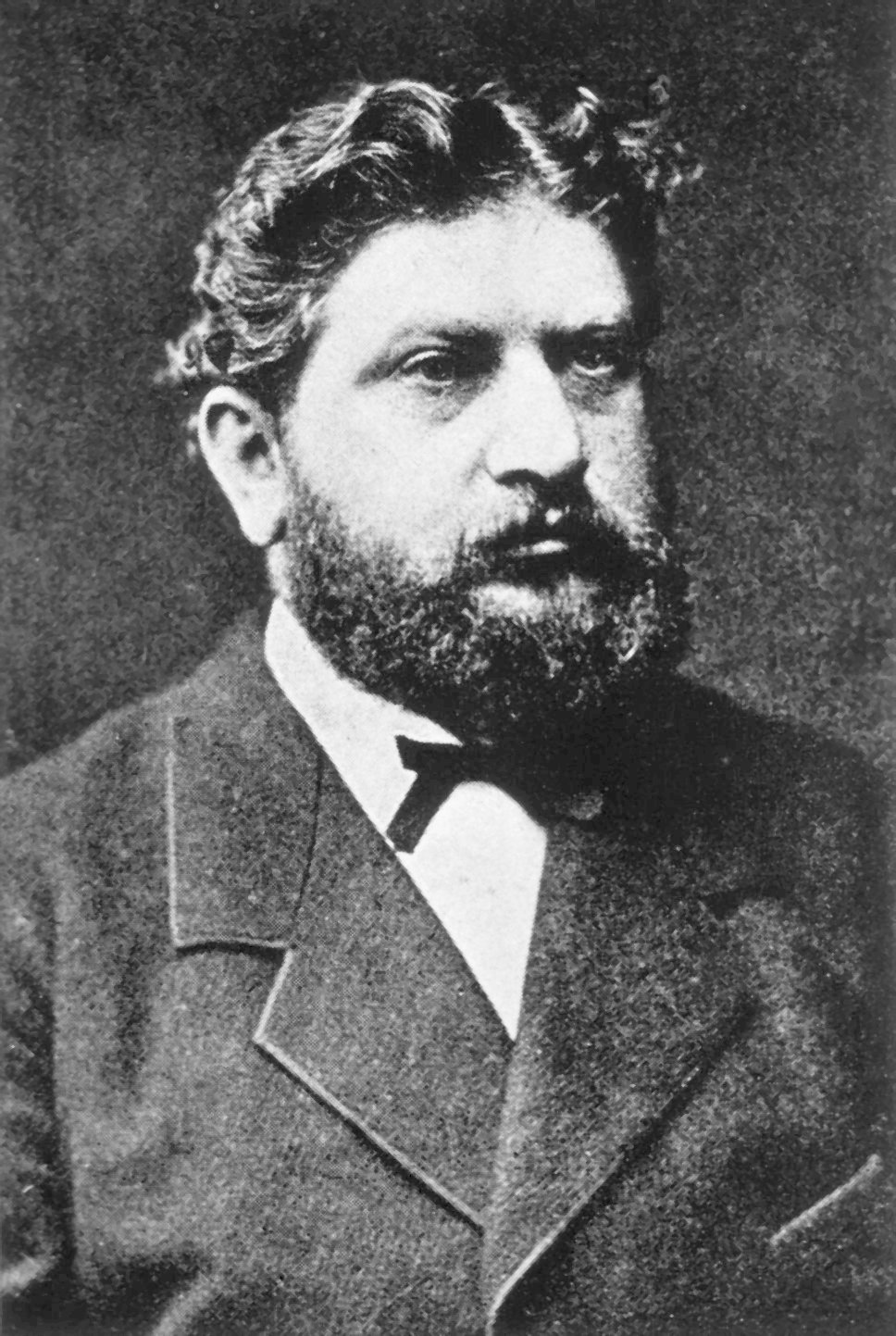
- Julius Friedrich Cohnheim
- Born: 20 July 1839; Demmin, Pomerania
- Died: 15 August 1884 (aged 45); Leipzig
- Scientific career
- Fields: Pathology

Julius Friedrich Cohnheim (20 July 1839 – 15 August 1884) was a German-Jewish pathologist.

== Biography ==
Cohnheim was born at Demmin, Pomerania. He studied at the universities of Würzburg, Marburg, Greifswald, and Berlin, receiving his doctoral degree at the University of Berlin in 1861. After taking a postgraduate course in Prague, he returned to Berlin in 1862, where he practised until 1864, when he took service as surgeon in the war against Denmark. In the fall of the same year he became assistant at the pathological institute of Berlin University under Rudolf Virchow, remaining there until 1868. During this time he published several articles relating to physiological chemistry and histology, but finally turned his especial attention to pathological anatomy. In 1867 there appeared in Virchow's "Archiv für Pathologische Anatomie und Physiologie und für Klinische Medicin" (xli) Cohnheim's essay, "Ueber Entzündung und Eiterung", which made his reputation as a pathologist. In it he proved that the emigration of the white blood-corpuscles is the origin of pus, a statement which produced a great revolution in pathology. In 1868 Cohnheim was appointed professor of pathological anatomy and general pathology in the University of Kiel; and four years later (1872) he went to the University of Breslau to fill a similar position. His work there was interrupted in the winter of 1873–74 by illness. In 1878 he accepted an invitation to become professor of pathology in the University of Leipzig, which chair he occupied until his death.

Cohnheim was the first to use the now universal method of freezing fresh pathological objects for examination; he also first demonstrated nerve-termination in "Cohnheim's areas" (polygonal areas indicating the cut ends of muscle-columns, seen in the cross-sections of striated muscle-fiber); he was the pioneer in the theory of inflammation, which is now universally accepted; and his researches in the field of pathological circulation and the causes of embolism marked a new departure in the methods of medical treatment.

Aside from his literary and experimental activity, Cohnheim was both popular and successful as a teacher.

He died in Leipzig in 1884.

== Selected works ==
Ueber die Entzündung seröser Häute," in Virchow's Archiv für pathologische Anatomie und Physiologie und für klinische Medicin, xxii.

- "Zur Kenntniss der zuckerbildenden Fermente," ib. xxviii.
- "Ein Fall von Abscessen in Amyloid entarteten Organen," ib. xxxiii.
- "Ueber die Endigung der Muskelnerven," ib. xxxiv.
- "Ueber den feineren Bau der quergestreiften Muskelfasern," ib. xxxiv.
- "Zur pathologischen Anatomie der Trichinenkrankheit," ib. xxxvi.
- "Ueber die Endigung der sensiblen Nerven in der Hornhaut," ib. xxxviii.
- "Ueber Entzündung und Eiterung," ib. xl.
- "Ueber Venöse Stauung," ib. xli.
- With Bernhard Fränkel, "Experimentelle Untersuchungen über die Uebertragbarkeit der Tuberkulose auf Thiere," ib. xlv.
- "Untersuchungen über die embolischen Processe," Berlin, 1872
- "Neue Untersuchungen über die Entzündung," Berlin 1873
- Vorlesungen über allgemeine Pathologie: Ein Handbuch für Aertze und Studirende, Berlin 1877–80, 2d ed. 1882
- Die Tuberkulose vom Standpunkte der Infectionslehre, Leipzig, 2d ed., 1881.
- Gesammelte Abhandlungen, Berlin, 1885, Herausgegeben von E. Wagner. Mit einem Lebensbilde Cohnheim's von W. Kühne.

== See also ==
- Pathology
- List of pathologists
