= Karl Friedrich Canstatt =

German physician and medical author

- Born: July 11, 1807; Regensburg, Kingdom of Bavaria
- Died: March 10, 1850 (aged 42); Erlangen, Kingdom of Bavaria
- Education: University of Vienna, University of Würzburg
- Known for: Founding Jahresbericht über die Fortschritte der Gesammten Medicin; coining the term "psychosis" (1841)
- Scientific career
- Fields: Medicine, Pathology, Ophthalmology
- Workplaces: University of Erlangen
- Doctoral advisor: Johann Lukas Schönlein

Karl Friedrich Canstatt (11 July 1807 in Regensburg – 10 March 1850 in Erlangen) was a German medical doctor and medical author.

== Biography ==
He received his education at the University of Vienna, followed by studies under Johann Lukas Schönlein at the University of Würzburg, where in 1831 he obtained his medical doctorate. The following year, he went to Paris to study Asiatic cholera, a disease that was then epidemic in the French capital. Canstatt's study of the disease, published in 1832, attracted the attention of the Belgian government, which commissioned him to take charge in establishment and management of a cholera hospital.

He remained in Brussels until 1838, afterwards returning to Regensburg in order to practice ophthalmology. The same year he was appointed physician to the provincial law court at Ansbach, where he stayed until 1843. Following the death of professor Adolph Henke (1843), he was appointed to the chair of pathology at the University of Erlangen. In 1846, he was stricken with tuberculosis, and believing that a change of climate would be beneficial, he relocated to Pisa. After a period of time in Italy, with no substantial improvement to his health, he returned to Erlangen.

== Works ==
Canstatt's greatest service to medicine was the creation and publication of the yearbook, Jahresbericht über die Fortschritte der Gesammten Medicin in Allen Ländern (Annual report of progress on the whole of medicine in all countries), begun in 1841, and continued for many years after his death. He was also the author of treatises on diseases of the eyes (1841) and Bright's disease (1844). Significant publications by Canstatt include:

- Die Cholera in Paris (1832) - Cholera in Paris.
- Über die Krankheiten der Choreida (1837) - On diseases of the choroid.
- Die Krankheiten des Höheren Alters und Ihre Heilung (1839).
- Handbuch der Medicinischen Klinik (1841) — he appears to have been the first to use the term psychosis in his 1841 handbook.
- Die Specielle Pathologie und Therapie, etc. (1841–42) - Special pathology and therapy.
- Klinische Rückblicke und Abhandlungen (1848) - Clinical summaries and treatises.

== See also ==
- List of pathologists
