= Karl von Hecker =

German gynecologist and obstetrician

Karl Hecker (8 May 1827 – 14 December 1882) was a German gynecologist and obstetrician born in Berlin. He was the only son of medical historian Justus Hecker (1795–1850).

He studied medicine at the Friedrich Wilhelm University of Berlin, Heidelberg University, the University of Paris, and the University of Vienna, receiving his doctorate in 1848 from Berlin. In 1851, he became an assistant at the clinic of obstetrics at the Berlin-Charité under Dietrich Wilhelm Heinrich Busch (1788–1858). Here he gained his habilitation in 1853 with a thesis involving retroverted gravid uterus (De retroversione uteri gravidi).

In 1858, he was an associate professor of obstetrics at Marburg University, and during the following year accepted an appointment as a gynecologist at the Ludwig-Maximilians-Universität München. In Munich, he was also director of the municipal district maternity hospital and school for midwives. From 1874 to 1875, he served as university rector. From 1877, he worked with Carl Siegmund Franz Credé (1819–1892) and Alfred Hegar (1830–1914) for the creation of an independent gynecological society, but it was not until 1885, three years after his death, when the Deutsche Gesellschaft für Gynäkologie was established.

Hecker was a son-in-law to politician Johann Caspar Bluntschli (1808–1881).

== Written works ==
- Beiträge zur Lehre der Schwangerschaft außerhalb der Gebärmutterhöhle (Contributions on the topic of pregnancy outside the uterus). 1858
- Klinik der Geburtskunde (Clinic of Obstetrics), 1861; with Ludwig von Buhl (1816–1880)
- Ueber die Schädelform bei Gesichtslagen. 1869
- Ueber den Gesundheitszustand der Wöchnerinnen in der Kreis- und Lokal-Gebäranstalt München (On the health of mothers in the district and local maternity hospital in Munich) 1877
- Beobachtungen und Untersuchungen aus der Gebäranstalt zu München, umfassend den Zeitraum von 1859–1879 (Observations and studies from the maternity hospital in Munich, comprising the period from 1859 to 1879).
