= Vossius ring =

Vossius ring (also called Vossius's ring or Vossius' ring) is due to blunt trauma to the eye. When the eye is injured, a circular ring of fainted or stippled opacity is seen on the anterior surface of the lens due to brown amorphous granules of pigment lying on the capsule. It has the same diameter as the contracted pupil, and is due to impression of the iris on the lens as a result of the force of a concussion injury, which drives the cornea and iris backward.

It is named after German ophthalmologist Adolf Vossius, who first described the condition in 1906.

== Differential Diagnosis ==
While typically caused by blunt trauma to the eye, Vossius rings can also be a sign of previous or active anterior uveitis. Inflammation in the anterior chamber can lead to Synechia (eye) in which the pupillary ruff adheres to the anterior lens surface. Once the synechia resolve, some pigment can remain on the lens leading to perceived blurring of bright lights. This is often exacerbated in low light conditions due to the pupil dilating, thus exposing more of the ring to the retina.
