= Spitz nevus =

Benign skin tumor

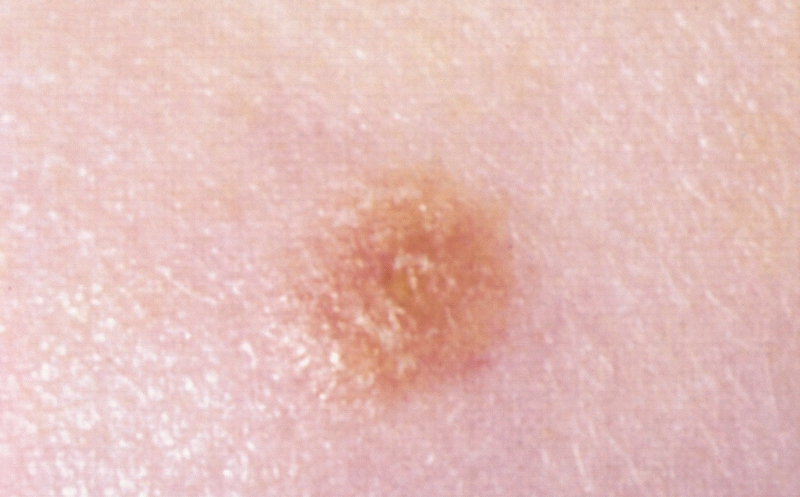
- Spitz nevus
- Specialty: Oncology, Dermatology
- Prognosis: benign

A Spitz nevus is a benign skin lesion. A type of melanocytic nevus, it affects the epidermis and dermis.

It is also known as an epithelioid and spindle-cell nevus, and misleadingly as a benign juvenile melanoma, and Spitz's juvenile melanoma). The name juvenile melanoma is generally no longer used as it is neither a melanoma, nor does it occur only in children.

== Pathophysiology ==
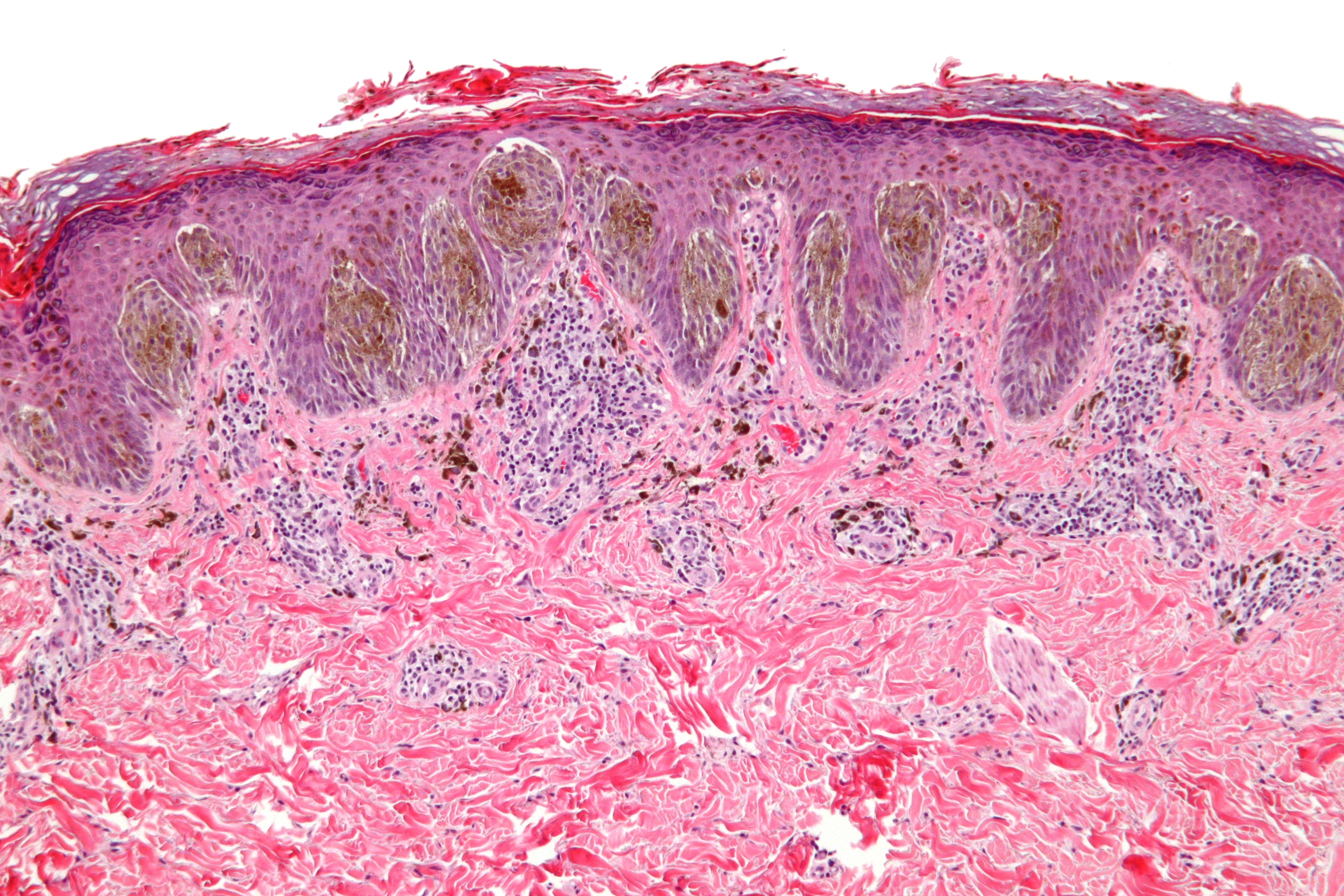
Micrograph of a Spitz nevus showing the characteristic vertically arranged nests of cells ("hanging bananas"). H&E stain.

The cause of Spitz nevi is not yet known. There is an association with sunburn, but causation is not established. Genetic studies of Spitz nevi have shown that most cells have the normal number of chromosomes, however a minority (25%) of cells have been shown to contain extra copies of parts of some chromosomes, such as the short arm of chromosome 11 (11p).

== Diagnosis ==
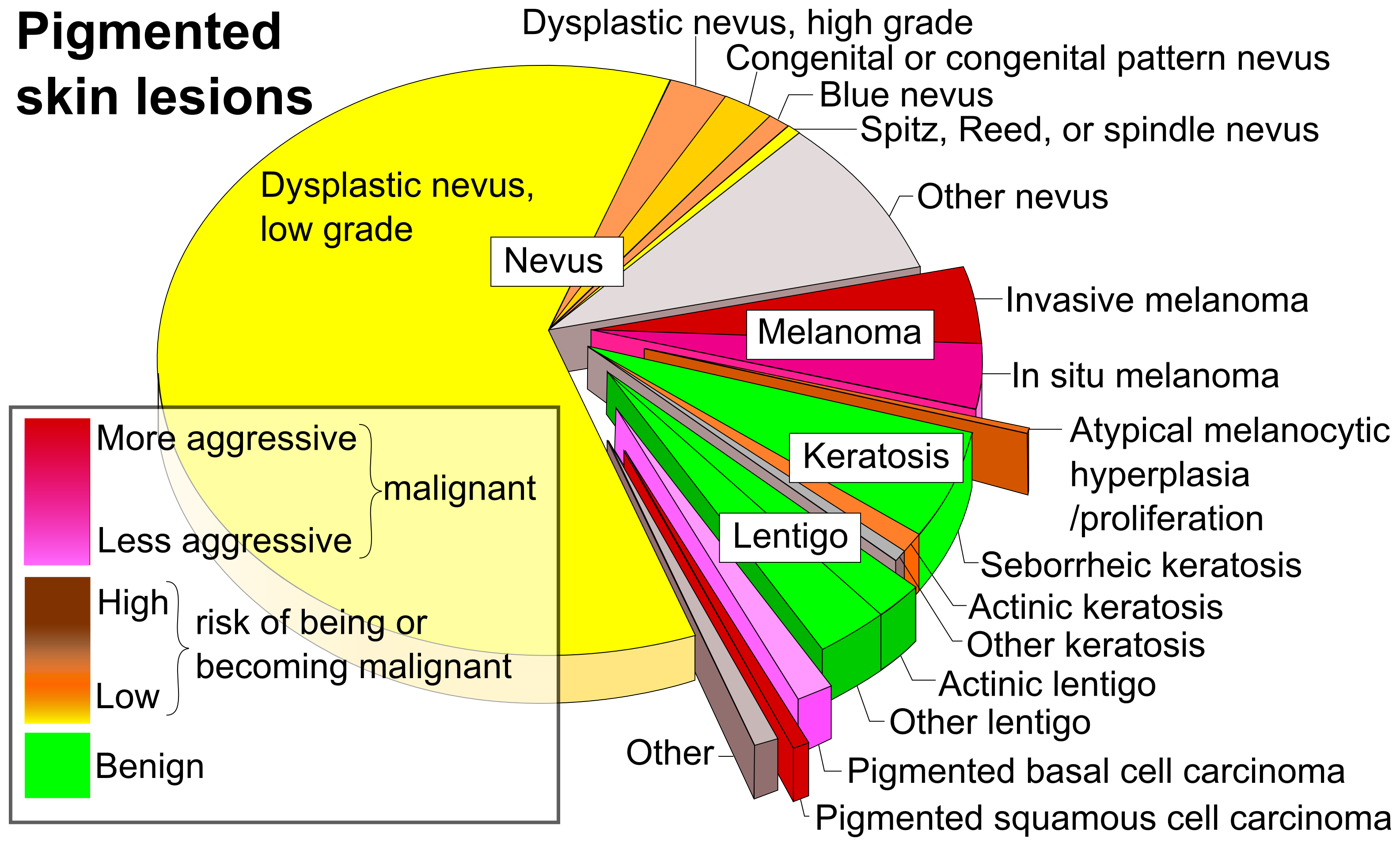
Various differential diagnoses of pigmented skin lesions, by relative incidence and malignancy potential, including "Spitz, Reed or spindle nevus" at top right.

On histopathology, Spitz nevi characteristically have vertically arranged nests of nevus cells that have both a spindled and an epithelioid morphology. Apoptotic cells may be seen at the dermoepidermal junction. The main histologic differential diagnoses are pigmented spindle cell nevus and melanoma.

== Treatment ==
Surgical removal is usually performed, even though it is benign.

== Epidemiology ==
Spitz nevi are uncommon. Their annual incidence was estimated in a coastal population of sub-tropical Queensland to be 1.4 cases per 100,000 people. For comparison, the annual incidence of melanoma in the same population, which is high by world standards is 25.4 cases per 100,000 people.

Although they are most commonly found on people in their first two decades of life, the age range for people with Spitz nevi is from 6 months to 71 years, with a mean age of 22 years and a median age of 19 years.

== Eponym ==
The lesion is named after Sophie Spitz, the pathologist who originally described it in 1948.

== See also ==
- List of cutaneous conditions
- List of genes mutated in pigmented cutaneous lesions
- Melanoma with features of a Spitz nevus
