= Stephen Sternberg =

American surgical pathologist (1920–2021)

Stephen S. Sternberg
- Born: July 30, 1920; New York City, New York, U.S.
- Died: May 12, 2021 (aged 100)
- Education: Colby College; New York University School of Medicine
- Occupations: Physician; Pathologist; Author; Editor
- Employer(s): Cornell University; Memorial Sloan-Kettering Cancer Center
- Known for: Work in experimental pathology; book and journal editorship in anatomic pathology & histology

Stephen Stanley Sternberg (July 30, 1920 – May 12, 2021) was an American surgical pathologist, who is known for his long career at the Memorial Sloan-Kettering Cancer Center and his contributions to diagnostic surgical pathology.

He served as the founding editor-in-chief of The American Journal of Surgical Pathology, a position he held for 24 years, and was an expert in colorectal neoplasia.

Sternberg was well known because of his editorship of two widely used reference books in anatomical pathology (Diagnostic Surgical Pathology, later renamed Sternberg's Diagnostic Surgical Pathology, and Histology for Pathologists).

== Biography ==
Sternberg was a native of Queens, New York, and was educated at Colby College, Waterville, Maine (B.S., class of 1941) and New York University School of Medicine (M.D., class of 1947). He subsequently completed postgraduate training in pathology at Charity Hospital, New Orleans, Louisiana and the Memorial Sloan-Kettering Cancer Center in New York City. He joined the attending staff of the latter institution in 1951, and rose through the ranks of the Cornell University faculty to become Professor of Pharmacology & Experimental Therapeutics.

He died in May 2021 at the age of 100.

== Research ==
In addition to his work in hospital-based surgical pathology, Sternberg had a prolific career as an experimental pathologist. His research topics included the toxicity of antineoplastic agents in laboratory animals, and the carcinogenic potential of selected chemical compounds in vertebrate organisms.

== As a consultant ==
Sternberg was an advisor or consultant to several national and international medical organizations, including the U.S. Department of Health, Education, and Welfare, the U.S. Food & Drug Administration, the U.S. Environmental Protection Agency, the World Health Organization, the New York Science Policy Association, the American Council on Health & Science, the National Science Foundation, the Association for the Advancement of Medical Instrumentation, and the Dutch Cancer Society.
