= Sophie Spitz =

American pathologist

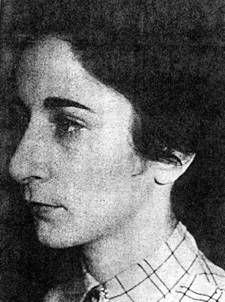
- Born: 4 February 1910; Nashville, Tennessee, United States
- Died: 11 August 1956 (aged 46); New York City, New York, United States
- Education: Vanderbilt University
- Spouse: Arthur Allen
- Scientific career
- Fields: Pathology
- Workplaces: New York Infirmary for Women and Children; Memorial Sloan-Kettering Cancer Center

Sophie Spitz (4 February 1910 – 11 August 1956) was an American pathologist who published the first case series of "juvenile melanoma," (a special form of benign melanocytic nevi), skin lesions that have come to be known as Spitz nevi. For her contributions to pathology, and especially for her foresight in advocating the use of the pap smear when it was newly devised, she is recognized as a prominent pathologist of her time.

== Life and career ==
Spitz was born in Nashville, Tennessee, the daughter of the tailor Joe Spitz (1883–1925) and Florence Spitz (née Levy, 1883–1974). Spitz had a passion for music in her youth and especially loved the violin.

Her uncle, Herman Spitz, was a pathologist and inspired her to pursue a career in medicine. She earned her MD from Vanderbilt University in 1932 and commenced her residency at the New York Infirmary for Women and Children.

Spitz met and married her husband, Arthur Allen, also a pathologist, in 1942. At around this time, she joined the Army Institute of Pathology, where she remained until 1945. It was here she developed an interest in tropical diseases and co-authored Pathology of Tropical Diseases: An Atlas with James Earle Ash.

Following World War II, she returned to work at the New York Infirmary and also at Memorial Sloan Kettering Cancer Center, where she described the twelve cases of what was then known as juvenile melanoma and recognized that these lesions have benign behavior despite their microscopic resemblance to melanoma. This clinically important information came to be published in the American Journal of Pathology in 1948, and the lesion now bears her name.

== Death ==
At 46 years of age, Spitz died from colon cancer at Memorial Hospital in New York City, before the term Spitz nevus was popularized.

She was living in New York City and was the director of the pathology department of the New York Infirmary before her death.
