= Adolf Vossius =

German ophthalmologist (1855–1925)

Adolf Vossius (10 February 1855, Zempelburg – 28 June 1925, Giessen) was a German ophthalmologist.

He studied medicine at the universities of Königsberg and Giessen, receiving his doctorate in 1879. Following graduation, he remained at Giessen as an assistant to Arthur von Hippel at the university eye clinic. In 1882 he obtained his habilitation at Königsberg, where five years later, he was named an associate professor. In 1890 he returned to the University of Giessen as a full professor of ophthalmology. At Giessen he opened a new eye clinic on Friedrichstrasse.

In 1906 he described a ring-shaped pigment deposit on the anterior lens surface following trauma to the eye, an injury now known as "Vossius' ring" or as "Vossius' lenticular ring". He described the condition in a paper titled "Über ringförmige Trübungen an der Linsenvorderfläche nach Kontusionsverletzungen des Auges".

== Selected works ==
- Grundriss der Augenheilkunde, 1888 – Outline of ophthalmology.
- Die wichtigsten Geschwülste des Auges, 1895 – The main tumors of the eye.
- Der gegenwärtige Standpunkt in der Pathologie und Therapie des ulcus corneae serpens, 1898 – The current position in regards to the pathology and therapy of ulcus corneas serpens.
- Über die hemianopische Pupillenstarre, 1901 – On hemianopic pupillary immobility.
- Über Star und Staroperationen in der Giessener Augenklinik, 1906 – Cataracts and cataract operations at the Giessen Eye Clinic.
- Lehrbuch der Augenheilkunde, 4th edition 1908 – Textbook of ophthalmology.
