= Theodor Ackermann =

German pathologist

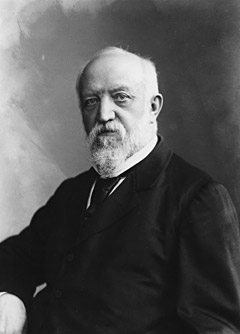
Theodor Ackermann (1825-1896)

Theodor Ackermann (17 September 1825 – 22 November 1896) was a German pathologist born in Wismar.

In 1852 he obtained his medical doctorate from the University of Rostock, obtaining his habilitation a few years later (1856) with a treatise on the physiological effects of emetics. In 1859 he became an associate professor, afterward turning down a professorship in internal medicine at Dorpat, and instead, he accepted a position as a professor at the Institute of Pathological Anatomy and Experimental Pathology at Rostock in 1865.

In 1873 he was appointed the Director of the Institute of Pathology at the University of Halle, where, in 1884-1885 he served as rector. In 1895 he was forced to resign for health reasons, his replacement being Karl Joseph Eberth (1835-1926).

== Written works ==
Among his better written efforts was a book involving the 1859 cholera epidemic in the Grand Duchy of Mecklenburg-Schwerin, Die Choleraepidemie des Jahres 1859 im Großherzogthum Mecklenburg-Schwerin (1860). Other principal works by Ackermann include:

- Über hypertrophische und atrophische Lebercirrhose (Virchow's Arch. Bd. CX).-- On hypertrophic and atrophic cirrhosis of the liver.
- Die Schädeldeformität bei der Encephalocele congenita (Halle 1882).-- treatise involving encephalocele congenita.
- Die Histogenese und Histologie der Sarkome, (Leipzig 1883). -- On the histogenesis and histology of sarcomas.
- Mechanismus und Darwinismus in der Pathologie (Rektoratsrede 1888) -- Darwinism and the mechanism of pathology.

== See also ==
- Pathology
- List of pathologists
