= Bracht–Wachter bodies =

Inflammatory cells seen in infective endocarditis

Bracht–Wachter bodies are a finding in infective endocarditis consisting of yellow-white miliary spots in the myocardium.

Histologically, these are collections of chronic inflammatory cells, mainly lymphocytes and histiocytes.

== History ==
They were described by two Germans, Erich Franz Eugen Bracht, a pathologist and obstetrician-gynecologist, and Hermann Julius Gustav Wächter, a physician.

== Related findings ==
Other findings in infective endocarditis are:

- Osler's nodes
- Janeway lesions
- Roth's spots
- Flea-bitten kidneys- pyemic spots
