= Melanoma with features of a Spitz nevus =

- Other names: Spitzoid melanoma
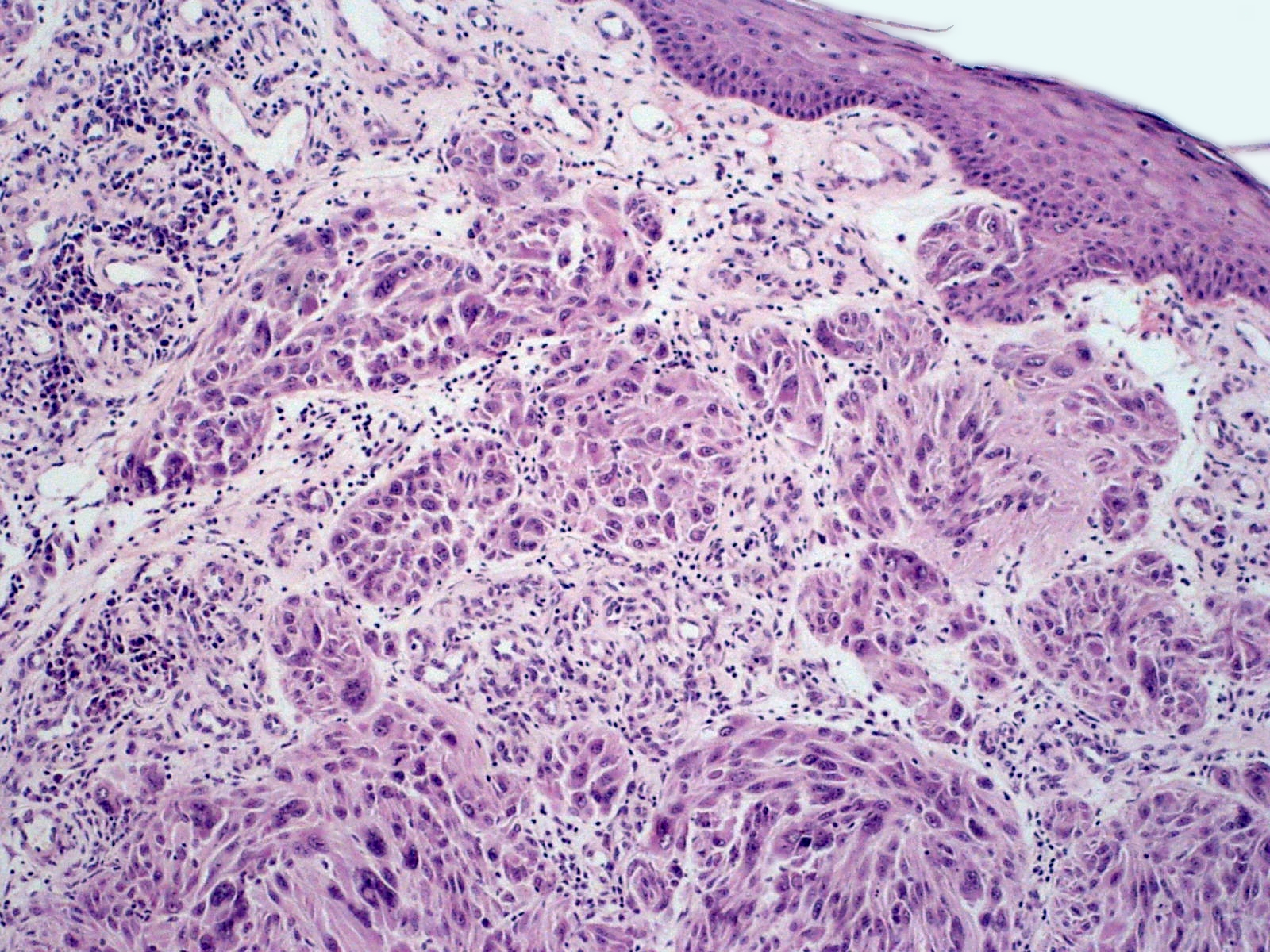
- Spitzoid melanoma
- Specialty: Dermatology

Melanoma with features of a Spitz nevus, also known as a Spitzoid melanoma, is a cutaneous condition characterized histologically with tissue similar to a spitz nevus and with overall symmetry and a dermal nodule of epithelioid melanocytes that do not mature with progressively deeper dermal extension.

== See also ==
- Melanoma
- Spitz nevus
- List of cutaneous conditions
