= Max Saenger =

German obstetrician and gynecologist

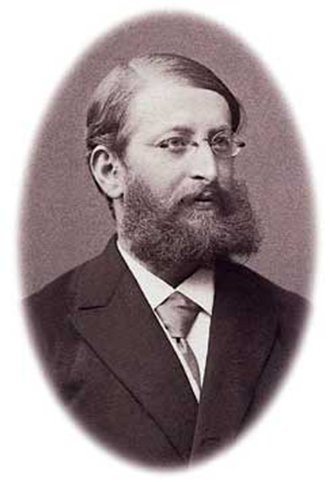
Max Saenger

Max Saenger (German: Max Sänger) (14 March 1853, Bayreuth – 12 January 1903, Prague) was a German obstetrician and gynecologist who was a native of Bayreuth.

He studied medicine at the University of Leipzig, then continued with graduate studies in OB/GYN and pathology under Carl Siegmund Franz Credé (1819–1892). He later became a professor of obstetrics and gynecology at Leipzig, and in 1890 was appointed professor of OB/GYN at the German University in Prague. In 1894 he co-founded the journal Monatsschrift für Geburtshilfe und Gynäkologie.

In 1882 he introduced the practice of sutural closure of the uterus following Caesarean section operations. The previous autumn, Ferdinand Adolf Kehrer (1837-1914) performed the first lower segment Caesarean section in Europe. Sänger's contribution preserved the mother's uterus and helped reduce the chance of infection. Afterwards, Kehrer and other surgeons adopted Sänger's methodology.

Sänger used silver and silk thread as suture material. Silver sutures had been introduced into medicine by the American gynecologist James Marion Sims (1813-1883).

Sänger was originally Jewish, but later converted to Lutheranism. Despite his conversion, he suffered discrimination due to his Jewish background.

== Terminology ==
- Saenger's suture: the closure of the uterine wound in Caesarean section by eight or ten deep silver wire sutures, and the use of twenty or more superficial stitches taken through the peritoneum.
- Saenger's operation: Cesarean section followed by careful closure of the uterine wound by three tiers of sutures. Also described as a Caesarean section in which the uterus is taken out through a long abdominal cut before the fetus is removed.

== Literature ==
- The Illustrated American Medical Dictionary (1938)
- NCBI National Library of Medicine; Max Sänger
