= The American Journal of Surgical Pathology =

- Discipline: Surgical pathology
- Language: English
- Edited by: Stacey E. Mills

Publication details
- History: 1977-present
- Publisher: Lippincott, Williams & Wilkins (United States)
- Frequency: Monthly
- Impact factor: 5.6 (2022)

Standard abbreviations
- ISO 4: Am. J. Surg. Pathol.

Indexing
- ISSN: 0147-5185 (print); 1532-0979 (web)
- OCLC no.: 3181447

Links
- Journal homepage; Online access; Online archive

The American Journal of Surgical Pathology is a peer-reviewed medical journal covering surgical pathology. It was established in 1977. Its first editor-in-chief was Stephen Sternberg (Memorial Sloan-Kettering Cancer Center); the current editor-in-chief is Stacey Mills (University of Virginia). According to the Journal Citation Reports, the journal has a 2022 impact factor of 5.6.
