= Hermann Julius Gustav Wächter =

German physician

Hermann Julius Gustav Wächter (1878 – c. 1944) was a German physician remembered for describing Bracht-Wachter bodies in infective endocarditis.

== Death ==
During World War II, Wächter was enlisted by the German Army to cure and alleviate depressed soldiers stationed on the front lines, however, he refused many times. In 1944, he was told that he and his family would be killed if he did not do as he was ordered, so he gave in and was assigned to Crucifix Hill. It is said that he did little to help the soldiers, but devoted most of his time to tending to the prisoners. He was declared a traitor and was to be killed by the Gestapo, but on October 8, 1944, while the Germans were fighting American forces, American bombers dropped tons of bombs on the hill. Apparently, Wächter was killed among others listed in the Waffen-SS defending the hill. His body was never found.
