= Prosector =

Profession in anatomy and pathology

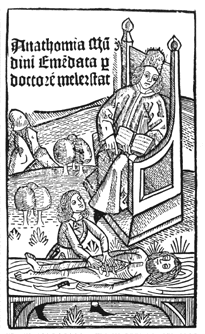
Prosector and physician in a dissection. From "Anathomia", M. da Luzzi, 1459

A prosector is a person with the special task of preparing a dissection for demonstration, usually in medical schools or hospitals. Many important anatomists began their careers as prosectors working for lecturers and demonstrators in anatomy and pathology.

The act of prosecting differs from that of dissecting. A prosection is a professionally prepared dissection prepared by a prosector – a person who is well versed in anatomy and who therefore prepares a specimen so that others may study and learn anatomy from it. A dissection is prepared by a student who is dissecting the specimen for the purpose of learning more about the anatomical structures pertaining to that specimen. The term dissection may also be used to describe the act of cutting. Therefore, a prosector dissects to prepare a prosection.

Prosecting is intricate work where numerous tools are used to produce a desired specimen. Scalpels and scissors allow for sharp dissection where tissue is cut, e.g. the biceps brachii muscle can be removed from the specimen by cutting the origin and insertion with a scalpel. Probes and the prosector's own fingers are examples of tools used for blunt dissection where tissue may be separated from surrounding structures without cutting, i.e. the bellies of biceps brachii and coracobrachialis muscle were made clearer by loosening the fascia between the two muscles with a blunt probe.

== Occupational risks ==
Generally, the risks to prosectors are low. Cadavers used for teaching purposes are embalmed before they are encountered by a prosector and students. Embalming fluid usually contains formaldehyde, phenol and glycerine which disinfect and kill pathogens within the cadaver. With exposure to embalming fluid, tissues and bodily fluids, such as blood, become fixed. Prosectors and students working with embalmed cadavers must always wear protective gloves, but that is more for protection against the harsh chemicals used in embalming, such as formaldehyde, which can cause moderate to severe skin irritation.

Further to the protection that embalming provides against disease, educational institutions take great care in screening the cadavers accepted into their body donation programs. Cadavers are not accepted if they have a medical history of infectious disease such as tuberculosis and HIV/AIDS.

Prosectors for autopsies of diseased cadavers may run a high risk of suffering from health problems when caution is not used, because cadavers are not fixed when being dissected for autopsy. At least two diseases are named after prosectors:

- Prosector's paronychia: a primary inoculation of tuberculosis of the skin and nails.
- Prosector's wart, a skin lesion, also caused by contamination with tuberculous material

Contracting infections caused by contaminated cadavers is a constant danger among prosectors, particularly if a skin puncture accident results from the sharp surgical instruments used in this kind of work (about 70% of pathology workers report having at least one percutaneous incident). In those cases, thin surgical gloves do not provide protection. There are many cases of pathologists dying of acute sepsis (blood poisoning) because of that. A famous historical case is that of Ernst von Fleischl-Marxow, an Austrian physician, pathologist and physiologist, who infected his finger during an autopsy and, due to the pain, became dependent on morphine and then cocaine, the latter at the instigation of his friend, Sigmund Freud.

Presently, AIDS presents a problem. Although it is difficult to contract it by a single puncture incident (the overall personal risk has been estimated to be 0.11%), at least one case has been reported among pathologists.

The continuous respiratory exposure to formaldehyde, used to preserve cadavers, is also an occupational risk of prosectors, as well as medical students, anatomists and pathologists. Inhaled formaldehyde can irritate the eyes and mucous membranes, resulting in watery eyes, headache, a burning sensation in the throat, and difficulty breathing. Formaldehyde is listed as a potential human carcinogen.

== Famous prosectors ==
- Jean Zuléma Amussat
- Paul Clemens von Baumgarten
- Frank Evers Beddard
- Christian Albert Theodor Billroth
- William Bowman
- Paul Broca
- Korbinian Brodmann
- Ernst Wilhelm von Brücke
- Alexis Carrel
- Niels Ryberg Finsen
- Friedrich Gustav Jakob Henle
- Josef Hyrtl
- Eduard Kaufmann
- Albert von Kölliker
- Eber Landau
- Karl Langer
- Paul Langerhans
- Giovanni Battista Morgagni
- Jan Evangelista Purkyně
- Heinrich Christian Friedrich Schumacher
- Joseph Toynbee
- Rudolf Virchow
