= Myocardial infarction complications =

Medical problems resulting from heart attacks

Myocardial infarction complications may occur immediately following a myocardial infarction (heart attack) (in the acute phase), or may need time to develop (a chronic problem). After an infarction, an obvious complication is a second infarction, which may occur in the domain of another atherosclerotic coronary artery, or in the same zone if there are any live cells left in the infarct.

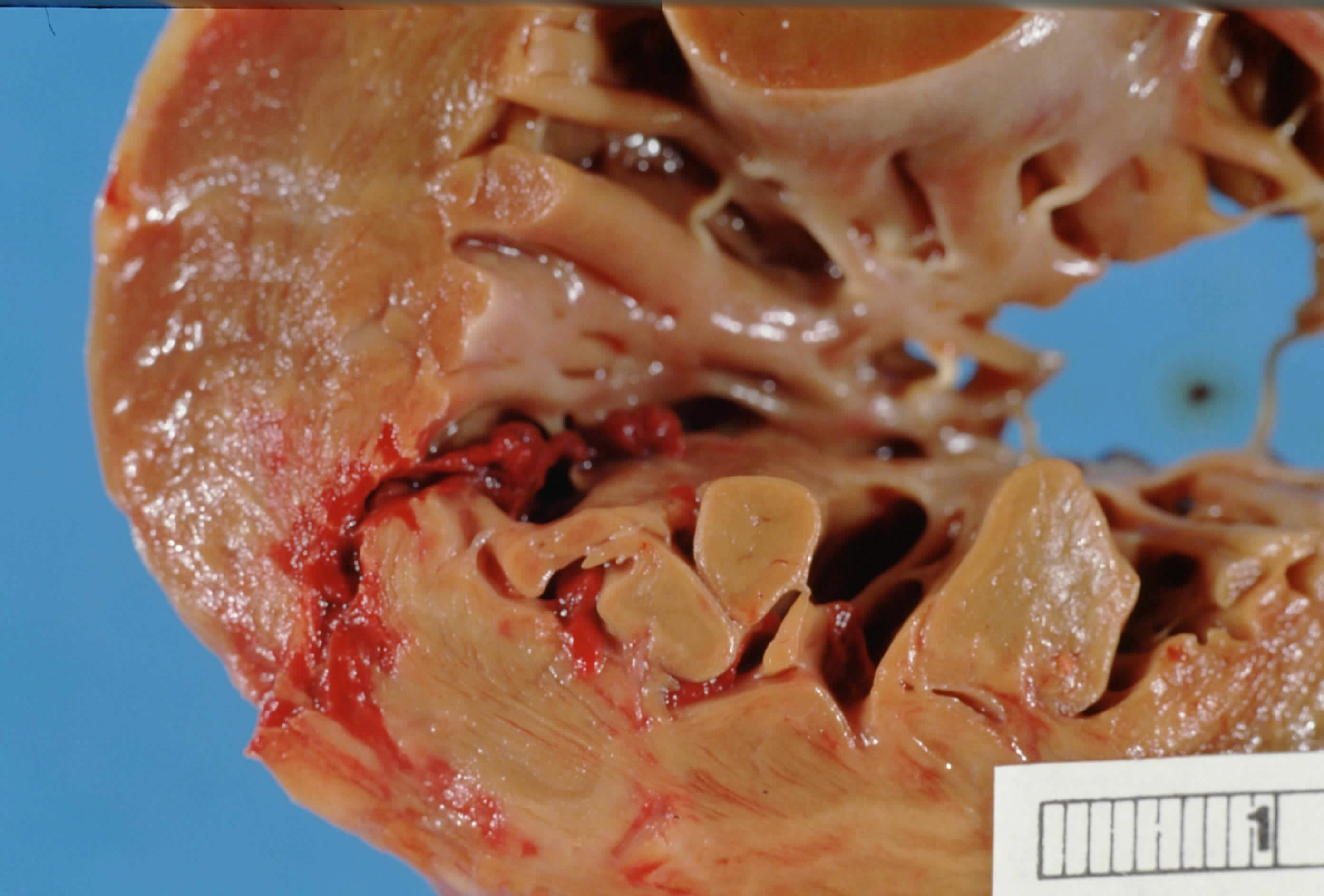
Rupture lateral margin of a 10 day infarct.

Post-myocardial complications occur after a period of ischemia; these changes can be seen as gross tissue and microscopic changes. Necrosis begins after 20 minutes of an infarction. Under four hours of ischemia, no gross or microscopic changes are noted. From 4-24 hours coagulative necrosis begins to be seen, which is characterized by the removal of dead cardiomyocytes through heterolysis and the nucleus through karyorrhexis, karyolysis, and pyknosis. On gross examination, coagulative necrosis shows darkened discoloration of the infarcted tissue. The most common complication during this period is an abnormal heart rhythm. The inflammatory phase marks days 1-7. Days 1-3 are marked by “acute inflammation”, in which neutrophils infiltrate the ischemic tissue. A major complication during this period is fibrinous pericarditis, particularly in transmural ventricular wall damage (an infarct that impacted all three layers of the heart, the epicardium, myocardium, and endocardium). This leads to inflammation, such as swelling, leading to rubbing of the heart on the pericardium. Days 4 through 7 are marked by “chronic inflammation”; on histology, macrophages will be seen infiltrating the tissue. The role of these macrophages is to remove necrotic myocytes. However, these cells weaken the tissue, leading to complications such as a ventricular free wall rupture, an intraventricular septum rupture, or a papillary muscle rupture. At a gross anatomical level, this stage is marked by a yellow pallor. Weeks 1-3 are marked on histology by abundant capillaries and fibroblast infiltration. Fibroblasts begin replacing lost cardiomyocytes with collagen type 1, leading to the formation of granulation tissue. After several weeks, fibrosis occurs and heavy collagen formation. Collagen is not as strong or compliant as the myocardium that it replaced; this instability could lead to a ventricular aneurysm, and the stasis of blood in an aneurysm can lead to a mural thrombus. A rarer complication that also occurs during this time is Dressler's syndrome and is thought to have autoimmune origins.

== Congestive heart failure ==
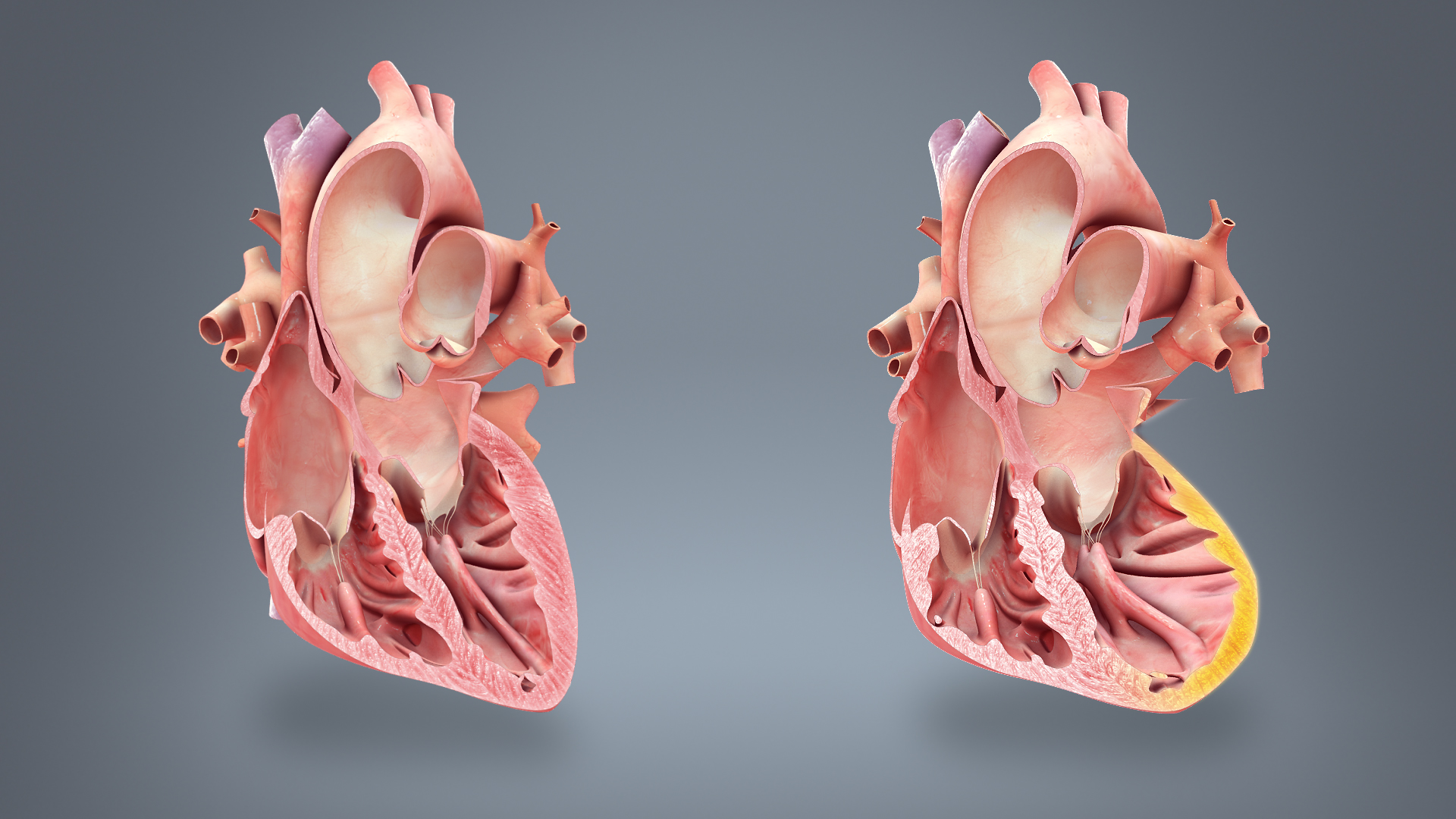
3D still showing normal heart vs heart failure.

A myocardial infarction may compromise the function of the heart as a pump for the circulation, a state called heart failure. There are different types of heart failure; left- or right-sided (or bilateral) heart failure may occur depending on the affected part of the heart, and it is a low-output type of failure. If one of the heart valves is affected, this may cause dysfunction, such as mitral regurgitation in the case of left-sided coronary occlusion that disrupts the blood supply of the papillary muscles. The incidence of heart failure is particularly high in patients with diabetes and requires special management strategies.

== Myocardial rupture ==
Myocardial rupture is most common three to seven days after myocardial infarction, commonly of a small degree, but may occur one day to three weeks later. In the modern era of early revascularization and intensive pharmacotherapy as treatment for MI, the incidence of myocardial rupture is about 1% of all MIs. This may occur in the free walls of the ventricles, the septum between them, the papillary muscles, or less commonly the atria. Rupture occurs because increased pressure against the weakened walls of the heart chambers occurs when the heart muscle cannot pump blood out effectively. The weakness may also lead to a ventricular aneurysm, a localized dilation or ballooning of the heart chamber.

Risk factors for myocardial rupture include completion of infarction (no revascularization performed), female sex, advanced age, and a lack of a previous history of myocardial infarction. In addition, the risk of rupture is higher in individuals who are revascularized with a thrombolytic agent than with percutaneous coronary intervention. The shear stress between the infarcted segment and the surrounding normal myocardium (which may be hypercontractile in the post-infarction period) makes it a nidus for rupture.

Rupture is usually a catastrophic event that may result in a life-threatening process known as cardiac tamponade, in which blood accumulates within the pericardium or heart sac. It compresses the heart to the point where it cannot pump effectively. Rupture of the intraventricular septum (the muscle separating the left and right ventricles) causes a ventricular septal defect with shunting of blood through the defect from the left side of the heart to the right side of the heart, which can lead to right ventricular failure as well as pulmonary overcirculation. Rupture of the papillary muscle may also lead to acute mitral regurgitation and subsequent fluid in the lungs and possibly even cardiogenic shock.

== Arrhythmia ==
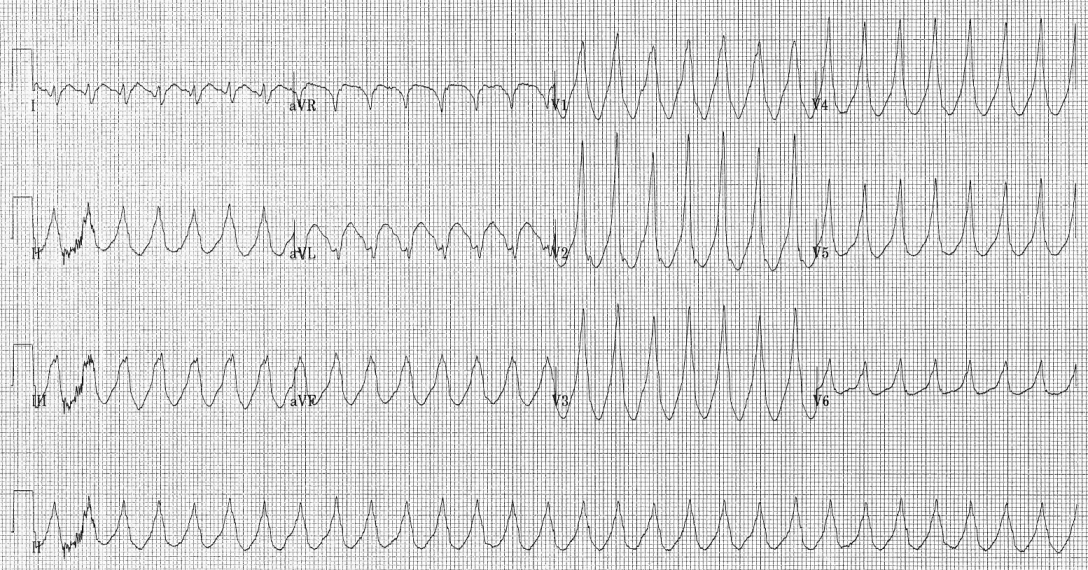
A 12 lead electrocardiogram showing ventricular tachycardia.

Since the electrical characteristics of the infarcted tissue change (see pathophysiology section), abnormal heart rhythms are a frequent complication. The re-entry phenomenon may cause rapid heart rates (ventricular tachycardia and even ventricular fibrillation), and ischemia in the electrical conduction system of the heart may cause a complete heart block (when the impulse from the sinoatrial node, the normal cardiac pacemaker, does not reach the heart chambers).

== Pericarditis ==
As a reaction to the damage of the heart muscle, inflammatory cells are attracted. The inflammation may extend and affect the heart sac. This is called pericarditis. In Dressler's syndrome, this occurs several weeks after the initial event. If pericarditis were to persist, pericardial effusion may also occur, which could in turn lead to cardiac tamponade if not properly treated.

== Cardiogenic shock ==
A complication that may occur in the acute setting, soon after a myocardial infarction or in the weeks following, is cardiogenic shock. Cardiogenic shock is defined as a hemodynamic state in which the heart cannot produce enough of a cardiac output to supply an adequate amount of oxygenated blood to the tissues of the body.

While the data on performing interventions on individuals with cardiogenic shock is sparse, trial data suggest a long-term mortality benefit in undergoing revascularization if the individual is less than 75 years old and if the onset of the acute myocardial infarction is less than 36 hours and the onset of cardiogenic shock is less than 18 hours. If the patient with cardiogenic shock is not going to be revascularized, aggressive hemodynamic support is warranted, with insertion of an intra-aortic balloon pump if not contraindicated. If diagnostic coronary angiography does not reveal a culprit blockage that is the cause of the cardiogenic shock, the prognosis is poor.
