= Recklinghausen (disambiguation) =

Recklinghausen may refer to:

- Recklinghausen (city), a city in Germany
- Recklinghausen (district), a district in Germany
- Neurofibromatosis type I, also known as Von Recklinghausen syndrome
- Heinrich von Recklinghausen (1867-1942), a German physiologist
- Friedrich Daniel von Recklinghausen, a German pathologist
