= Entosis =

Aspect of microbiology

Entosis (from Greek ἐντός entos, "within" and -ωσις -osis, "development process") is the invasion of a living cell into another cell's cytoplasm. The process was discovered by Overholtzer et al. as reported in Cell.

Entotic cells, also referred to as cell-in-cell structures, are triggered by loss of attachment to the extracellular matrix (ECM). This internalization of one cell by another is dependent on adherens junctions, and is driven by a Rho-dependent process, involving actin polymerization and myosin II activity in the internalized cell. Adherens junctions bind cells together by linking cadherin transmembrane protein complexes of adjacent cells to the cytoskeleton. When certain cell types are detached from the ECM and have lost adhesion, the compaction force between neighboring cells can cause them to push into their neighbors, forming the trademark cell-in-cell structures. Though cell-in-cell structures commonly refer to the interaction between two neighboring cells, entosis has been observed involving more than two cells. In the case of an entotic structure formed between three cells, the middle cell acts as both an internalizing and an outer host cell simultaneously.

Aneuploidy, a condition in which nondisjunction gives rise to gametes with an abnormal number of chromosomes, is one of the most prevalent phenotypes of human tumors. The underlying cause of aneuploidy remains highly debated; however, entosis is shown to perturb cytokinesis (cytoplasmic division) and trigger the formation of aneuploid cells. This would be in line with past research, as cell-in-cell structures have been widely observed in the focused study of many human tumors, including lung, breast, and endometrial stromal carcinomas.

A cell trapped by entosis is initially alive and can divide inside the cell that has enveloped it. On occasion, the entotic cell will be released by the host cell, but most internalized cells are eventually killed. Normal cells can kill themselves via apoptosis, which is followed by the programmed engulfment and phagocytic ingestion of the cell's remain by another. Entosis differs greatly from apoptosis in that the entotic process exhibits behavior closely resembling cellular invasion rather than cellular engulfment.

== General mechanism ==
The process is initiated when epithelial cells form adherens junctions, this is followed by the generation of actomyosin-contractility. The generation of mechanical stress drives cell engulfment by neighbor cell. After internalization, the inner cell is usually killed and digested by the outer cell. This process involves non-canonical autophagy, formation of lysosomes and nutrient recovery. Novel degradation and signaling pathways are employed during the inner cell killing and digestion process.

== Entosis in cancer ==
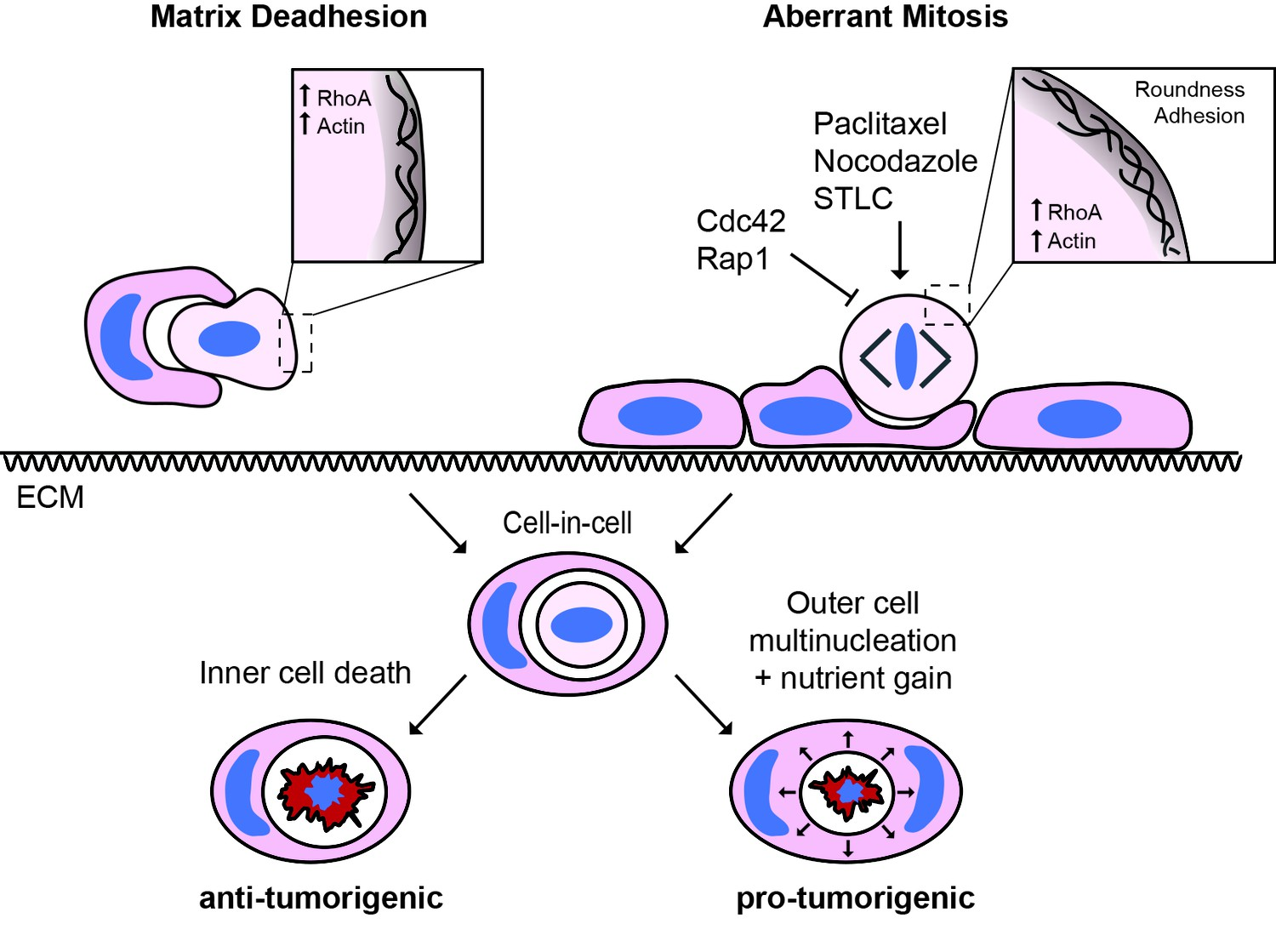
The triggers and consequences of entosis in cancer

Entosis has been found to be a different mechanism for cancer cells to form cell-in-cell structures at tumor sites. The entosis process in cancer cells is mediated via E-cadherin and P-cadherin. Since cadherins usually create homolytic cell to cell junctions, it is believed that the process mainly occurs between homologous cells. After cell-cell adhesions are mediated, the engulfed cells promote their own uptake into the neighbor cell. Additionally, they promote the ingestion process through actin polymerization and myosin contraction. The invading cell (outer cell) actomyosin contraction is regulated by controllers or cell tension such as RhoA, furthermore they accumulate actin and myosin at the cell cortex which generates the mechanical tension that generates the cell-in-cell invasion mechanism. The entosis mechanism can potentially have substantial energetic implication in cancer cells compared to other mechanisms of cell death and engulfment. A crucial part of the process is the active involvement of invading cells, which does not happen in other forms of cell engulfment. This allows the mechanism to selectively target living cells, excluding dead cells or non-living material such as cell debris. After internalization, engulfed cells are killed by the host cell following the maturation of the entotic vacuole that encapsulates the entotic cell. The maturation of the entotic vacuole involves modification by autophagy pathway proteins, followed by lysosome fusion and inner cell dead and degradation inside the host cell. In this mechanism, the autophagy pathway proteins play an important role by scavenging extracellular nutrients derived from the inner cell death. Internalized cells can also undergo alternative fates such as apoptosis or unharmed escape from host cell. In clinical cancer specimens, evidence of DNA fragmentation has been found suggesting that non-apoptotic cell death may be a common fate for entotic cells in human cancers. Entosis correlates with cancer worse prognosis in head and neck squamous cell carcinoma, anal carcinoma, lung adenocarcinoma, pancreatic ductal carcinoma, and some breast ductal carcinoma. In breast cancer, entosis correlates with two classical prognostic factors of breast cancer (HER2 and Ki67). In the analysis of entosis of the clinical case - calculations of the frequency of entosis showed that the highest frequency of entosis is during the formation of metastasis and when the neoplastic process is very advanced, the frequency of entotic structures decreases, suggesting entosis is a regulated process that varies according to stage.

== Videos ==
- Entosis: a cell-in-cell invasion and death process: https://hms.harvard.edu/news-events/multimedia/entosis
- Entosis of prostate cancer PC-3 cells: https://www.youtube.com/watch?v=R5zNk0uXJHA
- When cells invade: Entosis: https://www.youtube.com/watch?v=fJxA-XoAK-A

== See also ==
- Apoptosis
- Autoschizis
- Necrosis
- Autophagy
- Emperipolesis
