= Coagulative necrosis =

Unplanned cell death in which cellular structures are preserved

Coagulative necrosis is a type of accidental cell death typically caused by ischemia or infarction. In coagulative necrosis, the architectures of dead tissue are preserved for at least a couple of days. It is believed that the injury denatures structural proteins as well as lysosomal enzymes, thus blocking the proteolysis of the damaged cells. The lack of lysosomal enzymes allows it to maintain a "coagulated" morphology for some time. Like most types of necrosis, if enough viable cells are present around the affected area, regeneration will usually occur. Coagulative necrosis occurs in most bodily organs, excluding the brain. Different diseases are associated with coagulative necrosis, including acute tubular necrosis and acute myocardial infarction.

Coagulative necrosis can also be induced by high local temperature; it is a desired effect of treatments such as high intensity focused ultrasound applied to cancerous cells.

== Causes ==
Coagulative necrosis is most commonly caused by conditions that do not involve severe trauma, toxins or an acute or chronic immune response. The lack of oxygen (hypoxia) causes cell death in a localized area which is perfused by blood vessels failing to deliver primarily oxygen, but also other important nutrients. While ischemia in most tissues of the body will cause coagulative necrosis, in the central nervous system ischemia causes liquefactive necrosis, as there is very little structural framework in neural tissue.

== Pathology ==
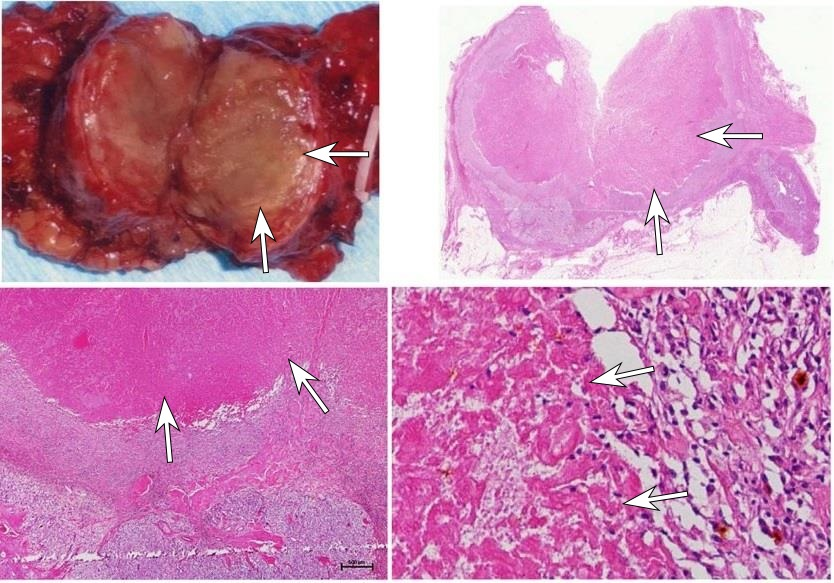
Histopathology of a pheochromocytoma with coagulative necrosis, displayed at gross pathology (upper left) and light microscopy at low (upper right), medium (lower left) and high magnification (lower right).

=== Macroscopic ===
The macroscopic appearance of an area of coagulative necrosis is a pale segment of tissue contrasting against surrounding well vascularized tissue and is dry on cut surface. The tissue may later turn red due to inflammatory response. The surrounding surviving cells can aid in regeneration of the affected tissue unless they are stable or permanent.

=== Microscopic ===
Microscopically, coagulative necrosis causes cells to appear to have the same outline, but no nuclei. The nucleus is lost and there is cytoplasmic hypereosinophilia on H&E stain.(Protein denaturation results in exposure of hydrophobic regions normally sequestered within the three-dimensional center of the molecules and may explain why necrotic cells display an increased capacity to bind the hydrophobic Eosin pigment) Also, it is characteristic of coagulative necrosis to not have a zone in between necrotic cells and viable cells. There is an instant transition, lacking granulation tissue in between.

== Treatments ==
Coagulative necrosis can be induced for treatments of cancers. Radiofrequency (RF) energy can be used in liver resection surgeries to produce coagulative necrosis, creating a coagulative necrosis zone. This coagulates the liver resection margins and is useful in liver resection surgeries for helping to stop bleeding within the resection margin, increasing the safety margin. To achieve coagulative necrosis in tumor tissue, it only takes around 20 minutes of application with the RF probe. Additionally, high-intensity focused ultrasound (HIFU) also induces coagulative necrosis in target tumors. Both of these treatments use coagulative necrosis in treatment of cancer.

== Regeneration ==
As the majority of the structural remnants of the necrotic tissue remains, labile cells adjacent to the affected tissue will replicate and replace the cells that have been killed during the event. Labile cells are constantly undergoing mitosis and can therefore help reform the tissue, whereas nearby stable and permanent cells (e.g. neurons and cardiomyocytes) do not undergo mitosis and will not replace the tissue affected. Fibroblasts will also migrate to the affected area, depositing fibrous tissue producing fibrosis or scarring in areas where viable cells do not replicate and replace tissue.
