= Liquefaction =

Process that generates a liquid from a solid or a gas

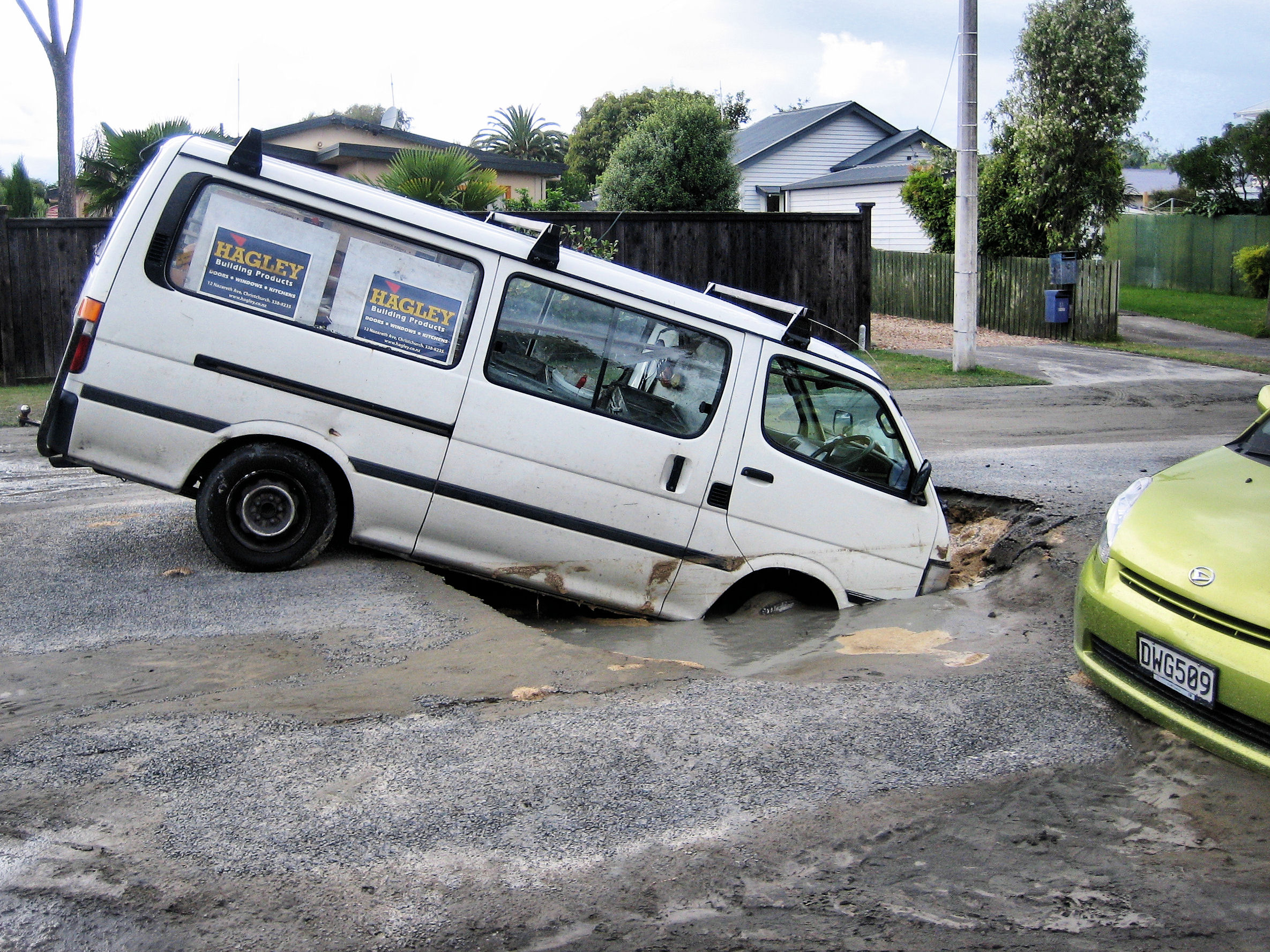
The effects of soil liquefaction, seen after 2011 Canterbury earthquake

In materials science, liquefaction is a process that generates a liquid from a solid or a gas or that generates a non-liquid phase which behaves in accordance with fluid dynamics. It occurs both naturally and artificially. As an example of the latter, a "major commercial application of liquefaction is the liquefaction of air to allow separation of the constituents, such as oxygen, nitrogen, and the noble gases." Another is the conversion of solid coal into a liquid form usable as a substitute for liquid fuels.

In geology, soil liquefaction refers to the process by which water-saturated, unconsolidated sediments are transformed into a substance that acts like a liquid, often in an earthquake. Soil liquefaction was blamed for building collapses in the city of Palu, it made the ground less compact Indonesia in October 2018.

In a related phenomenon, liquefaction of bulk materials in cargo ships may cause a dangerous shift in the load.

In physics and chemistry, the phase transitions from solid and gas to liquid (melting and condensation, respectively) may be referred to as liquefaction. The melting point (sometimes called liquefaction point) is the temperature and pressure at which a solid becomes a liquid. In commercial and industrial situations, the process of condensing a gas to liquid is sometimes referred to as liquefaction of gases. Coal liquefaction is the production of liquid fuels from coal using a variety of industrial processes.

Liquefaction is also used in commercial and industrial settings to refer to mechanical dissolution of a solid by mixing, grinding or blending with a liquid. In kitchen or laboratory settings, solids may be chopped into smaller parts sometimes in combination with a liquid, for example in food preparation or laboratory use. This may be done with a blender.

In biology, liquefaction often involves organic tissue turning into a more liquid-like state. For example, liquefactive necrosis in pathology, or liquefaction as a parameter in semen analysis.

== See also ==
- Cryogenic energy storage
- Fluidization
- Liquifaction point
- Thixotropy
