= Autoschizis =

Form of cancer cell death

"Autoschizis" is a term derived from the Greek αὐτο- auto-, meaning "self", and σχίζειν skhizein, "to split". It was introduced in 1998 to describe a novel form of cancer cell death characterized by a reduction in cell size that occurs due to the loss of cytoplasm through self-excision (the cell splits open) without the loss of cell organelles, morphologic degradation of the cells nucleus and nucleolus without the formation of apoptotic bodies and destruction of the cell membrane. The cell death results from karyorrhexis and karyolysis. Autoschizis can be initiated via in vivo treatment with vitamin C (VC), synthetic vitamin K (VK3) or, better, a combination of both. The treatment has been tested on various types of cancer cells in vitro and in vivo with positive results.
