= Peripolesis =

Process of cellular attachment

Peripolesis is the process in which a cell attaches itself to another cell. This is differentiated from emperipolesis, which is when one cell is engulfed by another.

Peripolesis is thought to be a physiological mechanism involved in regulating some processes of immune response. It was observed between lymphocytes and macrophages following skin grafts between subjects, and after immune challenge with antigens. Peripolesis was also observed in lung alveoli, where the peripolesed macrophages were not injured, but the cell membrane did appear to be temporarily altered. In patients with active sarcoidosis, which is characterized by lymphocyte-macrophage cooperation, lymphocyte peripolesis appeared to occur in clusters and could last for minutes to hours. The lymphocytes could be seen moving around a macrophage while maintaining contact.
