= ENDOG =

Protein-coding gene in the species Homo sapiens

Identifiers
- Aliases: ENDOG, endonuclease G
- External IDs: OMIM: 600440; MGI: 1261433; GeneCards: ENDOG

Gene location (Human)
Chr.	Chromosome 9 (human)
Band	9q34.11	Start	128,818,500 bp
Band	9q34.11	End	128,822,676 bp

Gene location (Mouse)
Chr.	Chromosome 2 (mouse)
Band	2|2 B	Start	30,061,505 bp
Band	2|2 B	End	30,064,081 bp
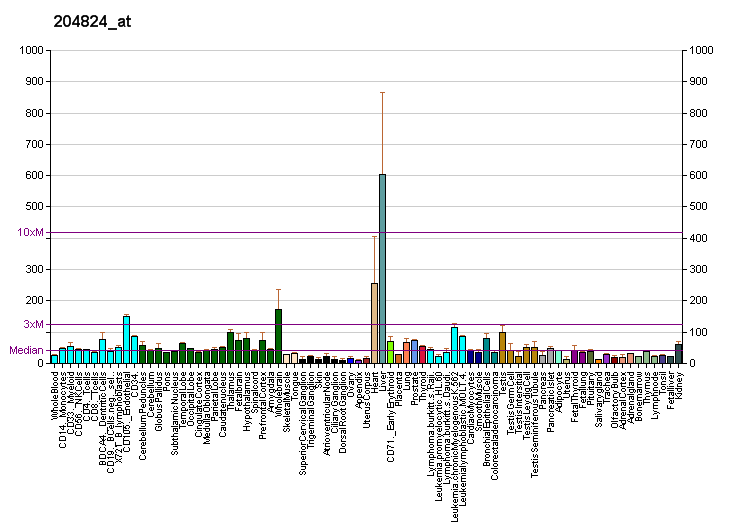
RNA expression pattern
Bgee	Human / Mouse (ortholog); Top expressed in: muscle of thigh; apex of heart; gastrocnemius muscle; triceps brachii muscle; body of tongue; vastus lateralis muscle; Skeletal muscle tissue of rectus abdominis; thoracic diaphragm; biceps brachii; Skeletal muscle tissue of biceps brachii / Top expressed in: right ventricle; digastric muscle; myocardium of ventricle; masseter muscle; sternocleidomastoid muscle; soleus muscle; extraocular muscle; temporal muscle; right kidney; tibialis anterior muscle; More reference expression data
BioGPS	More reference expression data
Gene ontology
Molecular function	deoxyribonuclease activity; metal ion binding; protein binding; nucleic acid binding; nuclease activity; endonuclease activity; hydrolase activity; single-stranded DNA endodeoxyribonuclease activity; endoribonuclease activity; exodeoxyribonuclease activity
Cellular component	cytosol; perikaryon; mitochondrion; nucleus; mitochondrial inner membrane
Biological process	cellular response to calcium ion; positive regulation of apoptotic DNA fragmentation; DNA recombination; apoptotic DNA fragmentation; response to estradiol; response to antibiotic; response to mechanical stimulus; ageing; in utero embryonic development; response to tumor necrosis factor; neuron death in response to oxidative stress; positive regulation of apoptotic process; cellular response to oxidative stress; cellular response to hypoxia; cellular response to glucose stimulus; positive regulation of hydrogen peroxide-mediated programmed cell death; DNA catabolic process, endonucleolytic; RNA phosphodiester bond hydrolysis, endonucleolytic
Sources:Amigo / QuickGO
Orthologs
Databases	NCBI: entry; OMA: entry
Species	Human	Mouse
Entrez	2021	13804
Ensembl	ENSG00000167136	ENSMUSG00000015337
UniProt	Q14249	O08600
RefSeq (mRNA)	NM_004435	NM_007931
RefSeq (protein)	NP_004426	NP_031957
Location (UCSC)	Chr 9: 128.82 – 128.82 Mb	Chr 2: 30.06 – 30.06 Mb
PubMed search
- Wikidata
View/Edit Human	View/Edit Mouse

Endonuclease G, mitochondrial is an enzyme that in humans is encoded by the ENDOG gene. This protein primarily participates in caspase-independent apoptosis via DNA degradation when translocating from the mitochondrion to nucleus under oxidative stress. As a result, EndoG has been implicated in cancer, aging, and neurodegenerative diseases such as Parkinson's disease (PD). Regulation of its expression levels thus holds potential to treat or ameliorate those conditions.

== Structure ==
The enzyme encoded by this gene is a member of the conserved DNA/RNA non-specific ββα-Me-finger nuclease family and possesses a unique site selectivity of poly(dG).poly(dC) sequences in double-stranded DNA. The protein is initially synthesized as an inactive 33-kDa precursor. This precursor is activated by proteolytic cleavage of the mitochondrial targeting sequence, thus producing a mature 28-kDa enzyme that is translocated to the mitochondrial intermembrane space, where it forms an active homodimer. The H-N-N motif (His-141, Asn-163, Asn-172) is crucial for the protein's catalytic function and substrate specificity, and the His-141 amino acid is necessary for magnesium coordination. The amino acid Asn-251 also appears to be catalytic, and Glu-271 appears to be another magnesium ligand, but both are located far from the H-N-N motif and, thus, their interactions are unclear.

== Function ==
The protein encoded by this gene is a nuclear encoded endonuclease that is localized in the mitochondrial intermembrane space. The encoded protein is widely distributed among animals and cleaves DNA at GC tracts. This protein is capable of generating the RNA primers required by DNA polymerase gamma to initiate replication of mitochondrial DNA. In some apoptotic pathways, EndoG is released from the mitochondrion and migrates to the nucleus, where it degrades chromatin with the help of other nuclear proteins. In one such pathway, caspase-independent apoptosis, the E3 ligase C-terminal of Hsc-70 interacting protein (CHIP), a regulator of EndoG expression, functions as a protective mechanism against oxidative stress. Under normal conditions, EndoG remains bound to Hsp70 and CHIP; however, when undergoing oxidative stress, EndoG dissociates from Hsp70 and CHIP and translocates to the nucleus, where it degrades DNA to effect apoptosis. Therefore, maintaining low levels of EndoG could prevent cell death caused by stress conditions. In epithelial cells, the nuclear localization and proapoptotic function of EndoG leads it to play a role in cell senescence. In addition to DNA degradation, EndoG also stimulates inhibitors of apoptosis proteins (IAPs) to target proteins for proteasomal degradation.

== Clinical significance ==
The Endonuclase G enzyme is an important constituent in apoptotic signaling and oxidative stress, most notably as part of the mitochondrial death pathway and cardiac myocyte apoptosis signaling. Programmed cell death is a distinct genetic and biochemical pathway essential to metazoans. An intact death pathway is required for successful embryonic development and the maintenance of normal tissue homeostasis. Apoptosis has proven to be tightly interwoven with other essential cell pathways. The identification of critical control points in the cell death pathway has yielded fundamental insights for basic biology, as well as provided rational targets for new therapeutics a normal embryologic processes, or during cell injury (such as ischemia-reperfusion injury during heart attacks and strokes) or during developments and processes in cancer, an apoptotic cell undergoes structural changes including cell shrinkage, plasma membrane blebbing, nuclear condensation, and fragmentation of the DNA and nucleus. This is followed by fragmentation into apoptotic bodies that are quickly removed by phagocytes, thereby preventing an inflammatory response. It is a mode of cell death defined by characteristic morphological, biochemical and molecular changes. It was first described as a "shrinkage necrosis", and then this term was replaced by apoptosis to emphasize its role opposite mitosis in tissue kinetics. In later stages of apoptosis the entire cell becomes fragmented, forming a number of plasma membrane-bounded apoptotic bodies which contain nuclear and or cytoplasmic elements. The ultrastructural appearance of necrosis is quite different, the main features being mitochondrial swelling, plasma membrane breakdown and cellular disintegration. Apoptosis occurs in many physiological and pathological processes. It plays an important role during embryonal development as programmed cell death and accompanies a variety of normal involutional processes in which it serves as a mechanism to remove "unwanted" cells.

The BNIP3 pathway involves mitochondrial release and nuclear translocation of the endonuclease G. It is not clear, however, that how BNIP3 interacts with mitochondria. It has been shown that BNIP3 interacts with the voltage-dependent anion channel (VDAC) to directly induce mitochondrial release and nuclear translocation of EndonucleaseG. Data has identified VDAC as an interacting partner of BNIP3 and provide direct evidence to support that EndoG is a mediator of the BNIP3 cell death pathway. Most notably, Enodnuclease G is pivotal during oxidative stress by ischemia-reperfusion injury, specifically in the myocardium as part of a heart attack (also known as ischemic heart disease). Ischemic heart disease, which results from an occlusion of one of the major coronary arteries, is currently still the leading cause of morbidity and mortality in western society. During ischemia reperfusion, ROS release substantially contribute to the cell damage and death via a direct effect on the cell as well as via apoptotic signals. More recently, Endonuclease G is considered a determinant of cardiac hypertrophy. A link has been established between Endonuclease G and mitochondrial function during cardiac hypertrophy, partly through the effects of Endo G on Mfn2 and Jp2, and revealed a role for Endonuclease G in the crosstalk between the processes controlled by Mfn2 and Jp2 in maladaptive cardiac hypertrophy.

Previous studies reported greater efficacy of anticancer drugs when used in conjunction with high EndoG levels. Thus, regulators of EndoG, such as CHIP, could serve as therapeutic targets for oxidative stress-induced cell death in cancer and aging. Through its association with cell senescence in epithelial cells, EndoG may also contribute to age-related vascular diseases such as arteriosclerosis. Similarly, myonuclear localization of EndoG is correlated with atrophied aging skeletal muscle, leading to increased apoptotic signaling and muscle mass loss. EndoG has also been implicated in Parkinson's disease (PD), as it induces DNA fragmentation in neurons when translocated from the mitochondria to nuclei. This mechanism involves the kynurenine pathway and the permeability transition pore; as such, targeting molecules in this pathway could prevent EndoG-mediated cell death and effectively help treat PD in patients. Similarly, EndoG knockdown in mice mitigated injurious insults; thus, therapeutic strategies to inhibit or silence EndoG could help protect tissues during injury and disease. So far, two EndoG inhibitors, PNR-3-80 (5-((1-(2-naphthoyl)-5-chloro-1H-indol-3-yl)methylene)-2-thioxodihydropyrimidine-4,6(1H,5H)-dione) and PNR-3-82 (5-((1-(2-naphthoyl)-5-methoxy-1H-indol-3-yl)methylene)-2-thioxodihydropyrimidine-4,6(1H,5H)-dione, have been tested and confirmed.
