= Emperipolesis =

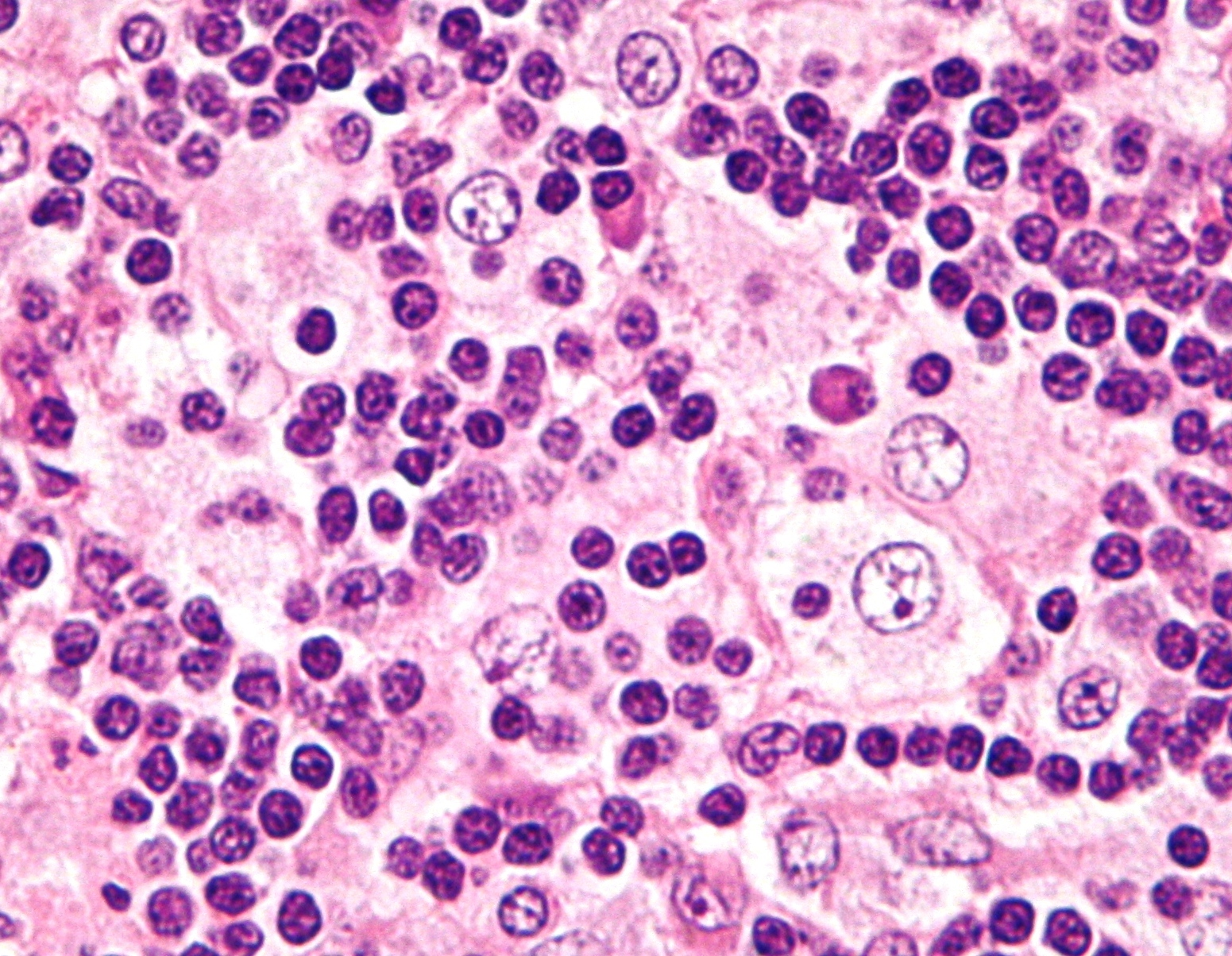
Micrograph showing emperipolesis in a case of Rosai-Dorfman disease. H&E stain.

Emperipolesis is the presence of an intact cell within the cytoplasm of another cell. It is derived from Greek (en 'inside' + peripoleomai 'go round'). Emperipolesis is an uncommon biological process, and can be physiological or pathological.

It is related to peripolesis, which is the attachment of one cell to another.

Emperipolesis is unlike phagocytosis, in which the engulfed cell is killed by the lysosomal enzymes of the macrophage. Instead, the engulfed cell remains viable within the other, and can exit at any time without causing structural or functional abnormalities in either cell.

== Classification ==
Emperipolesis has been classified into two categories:

1. Engulfment of hemapoietic cells by megakaryocytes such as in hematolymphoid disorders (Hodgkin's disease, leukemia, acute and chronic myeloid leukemia, non-Hodgkin's lymphoma, myeloproliferative disorders, myelodysplastic syndrome)
2. Engulfment of inflammatory cells by histiocytes, which is a hallmark of Rosai-Dorfman disease

== Other associations ==
It is seen in various conditions including:

- Autoimmune hepatitis
- Leukocyte migration from the blood stream to tissues through endothelial cells, in a process also known as transcellular migration and is akin to diapedesis (paracellular migration).

== Additional images ==
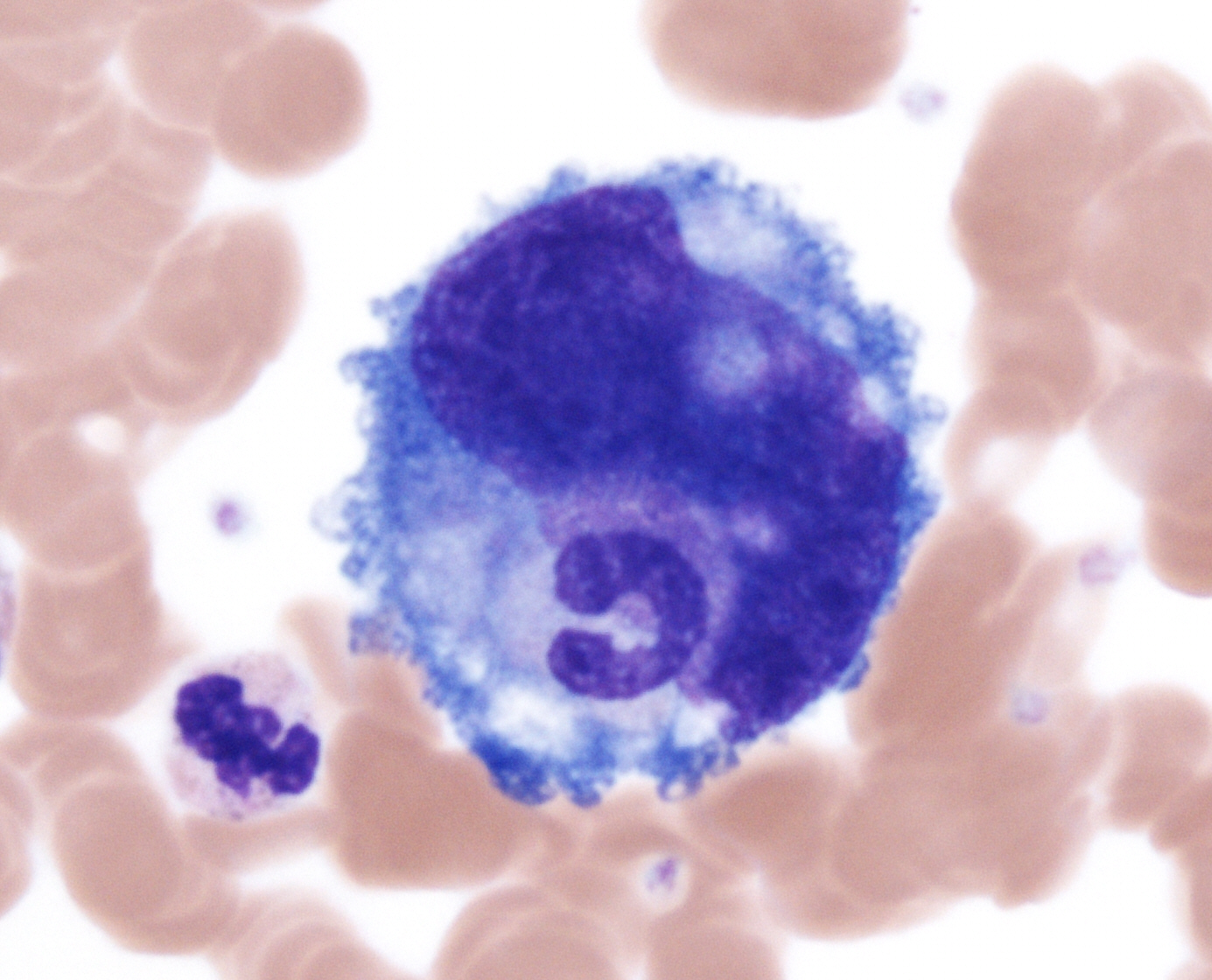
Emperipolesis: a band neutrophil inside a megakaryocyte (Wright-Giemsa, 100x, oil).

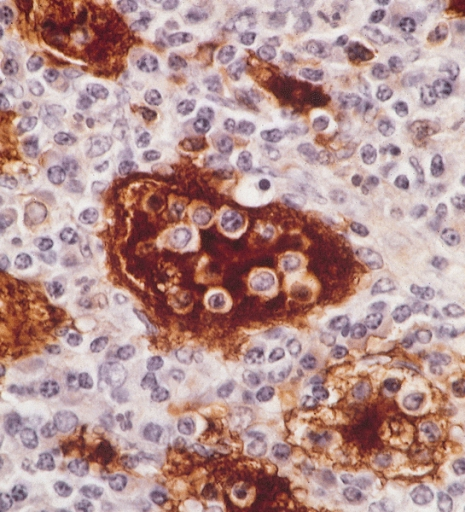
Emperipolesis in Rosai-Dorfman disease highlighted by S-100 staining.

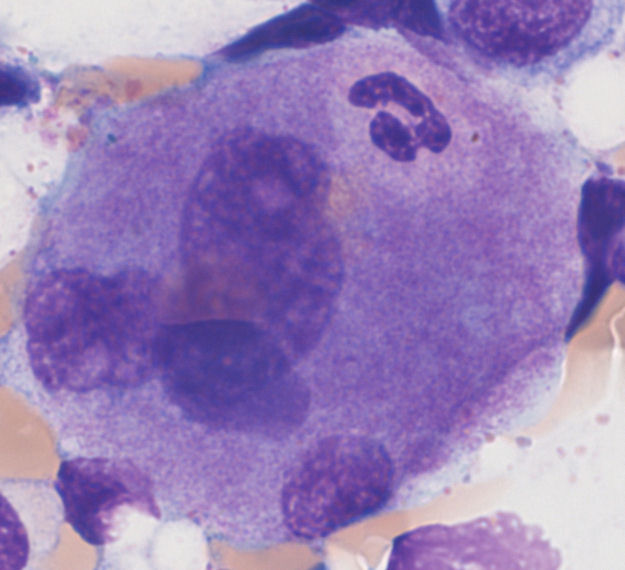
Emperipolesis: Megakaryocyte containing a segmented neutrophil, stained with a May-Grünwald Giemsa stain.

== See also ==
- Hemophagocytic syndrome
- Phagocytosis
- Symbiogenesis
- Entosis
