= Labile cell =

Cell that multiplies constantly throughout life

Labile cells are cells that continuously multiply and divide throughout life. Labile cells replace the cells that are lost from the body. When injured, labile cells are repaired rapidly due to an aggressive TR response. This continual division of labile cells allows them to reproduce new stem cells and replace functional cells that are lost in the body. Functional cells may be lost through necrosis, which is the premature death of cells caused by environmental disturbances, such as diseases or injuries. Functional cells may also need to be replaced after undergoing apoptosis, which is the programmed death of cells that occurs normally as part of an organism's development. Labile cells continually regenerate by undergoing mitosis and are one of three types of cells that are involved in cell division, classified by their regenerative capacity. The other two cell types include stable cells and permanent cells. Each of these three cell types respond to injuries to their corresponding tissues differently. Stable cells, unlike labile cells, are typically not dividing and only do so when an injury occurs. Permanent cells are not capable of division after maturing.

Some examples of labile cells, which act as stem cells, include skin cells, such as the epidermis, the epithelia of ducts, hematopoietic stem cells, cells within the gastrointestinal tract, and some cells found within bone marrow.

Labile cells exhibit a very short G1 phase and never enter G0 phase (the resting phase), as they are continually proliferating throughout their life.

== Hazards ==
Cells that are constantly dividing have a higher risk of dividing uncontrollably and becoming malignant, or cancerous. Muscle tissue does not consist of constantly dividing cells, which is likely why cancer of the muscle is not nearly as common as, for example, cancer of the skin.

In addition, cytotoxic drugs used in chemotherapy target dividing cells and inhibit their proliferation. The cytotoxic drugs aim to target the dividing cells which are malignant in the body; however, these drugs target all dividing cells and are not capable of only selecting the cancerous ones. Healthy cells, that are normally dividing in the body, are targeted and affected as well. For this reason, adverse effects are often produced from chemotherapy. The labile cells within epithelial tissue and bone marrow, for example, may be targeted, resulting in possible hair loss or bone marrow suppression.

== See also ==
- Stable cells, which only multiply when receiving external stimulus to do so
- Permanent cells, which don't have the ability to multiply
