= Friedrich Daniel von Recklinghausen =

German pathologist (1833–1910)

Professor Friedrich Daniel von Recklinghausen
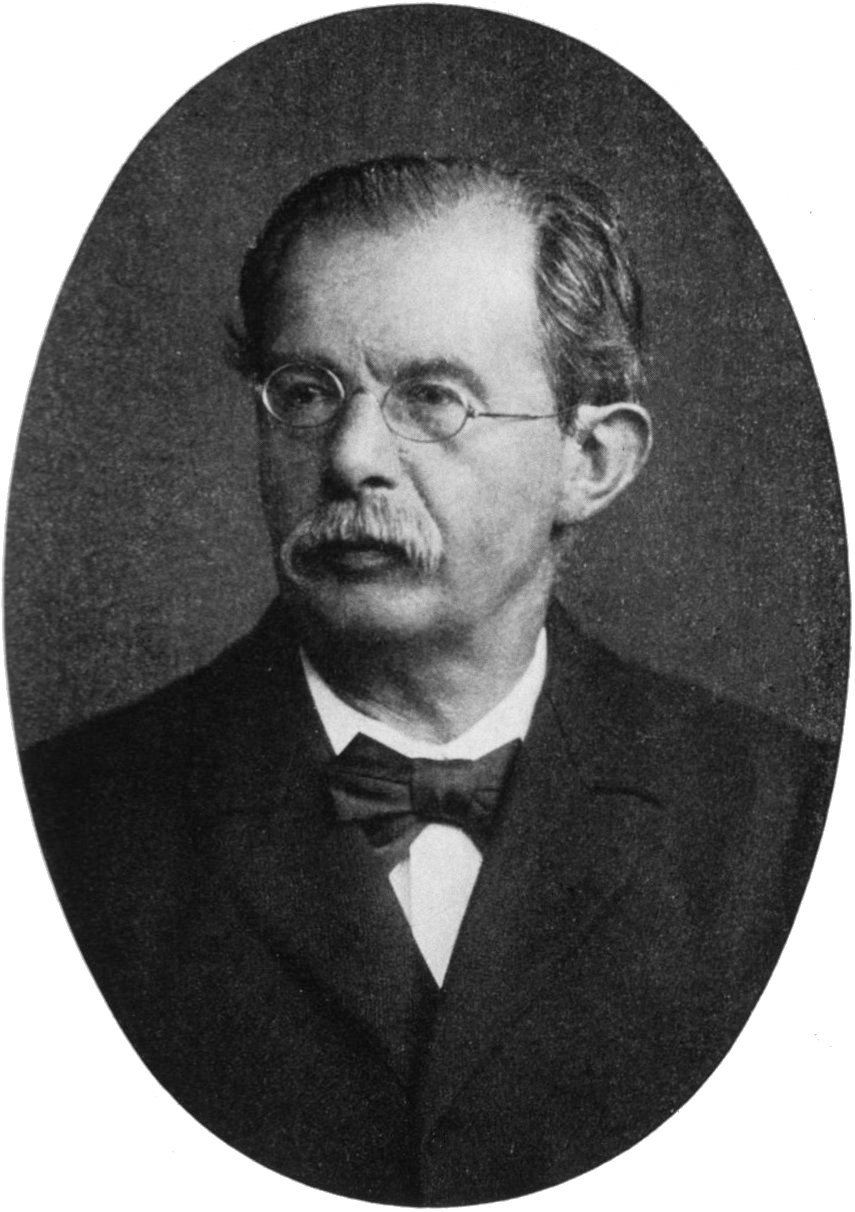
- Born: December 2, 1833; Gütersloh
- Died: August 26, 1910 (aged 76); Strasbourg
- Education: Humboldt University of Berlin
- Known for: Iron overload Neurofibromatosis type I
- Scientific career
- Fields: Pathology
- Workplaces: University of Strasbourg
- Doctoral advisor: Rudolf Virchow
- Notable students: Karl Koester

Friedrich Daniel von Recklinghausen (German: [ˈʁɛklɪŋhaʊzən]; December 2, 1833 – August 26, 1910) was a German pathologist born in Gütersloh, Westphalia. He was the father of physiologist Heinrich von Recklinghausen (1867–1942).

== Early life ==
Recklinghausen was born in Gütersloh, Germany, in 1833. He was the son of Friedrich Christoph von Recklinghausen and Friederike Charlotte Zumwinkel. His father was an elementary school teacher and a sexton. His mother died shortly after his birth in 1833. The Recklinghausens were a patrician family who put multiple councilors and mayors in their positions. He went to the elementary school where his father taught in Gütersloh. He then attended high school at Ratsgymnasium, Bielefeld.

== Academic background ==
Starting in 1852, Recklinghausen studied medicine at the Universities of Bonn, Würzburg, and Berlin, earning his doctorate at the latter institution in 1855. Afterwards he studied pathological anatomy under Rudolf Virchow, the father of modern pathology, and obtained his doctorate with Virchow as his advisor. He subsequently undertook an educational journey to Vienna, Rome, and Paris. From 1858 to 1864, Recklinghausen was an assistant at the Pathological Institute in Berlin. In 1864 he became the Professor of Pathological Anatomy at Königsberg before moving to Würzburg six months later. He remained a professor at Würzburg until 1872, when he was appointed Professor of General Pathology and Pathological Anatomy at Strasbourg until 1906. Henceforth, he remained as a professor emeritus, continuing to teach and conduct research until his death in 1910.

== Königsberg ==
At the age of 32 years old, Recklinghausen was already a Professor of Pathological Anatomy; a habilitation was unnecessary because of his academic and scientific background. In 1865, he was selected as the Chair of Pathological Anatomy at the Albertus University of Königsberg. The theme of his inaugural address was "De corporibus liberis articulorum" ("On the loose bodies of the joints"). In his short time at Königsberg he met his future wife Marie Jacobson (1846–1918), the daughter of the Jewish doctor Jacob Jacobson from Braunsberg in East Prussia. In 1867, the first of his five children was born. His son Heinrich Jacob von Recklinghausen later acquired a name for himself as a doctor, blood pressure researcher, and philosopher.

== Strasbourg ==
On April 20, 1872, Recklinghausen moved to the re-established Strasbourg, Kaiser Wilhelm University in the imperial country of Alsace-Lorraine. Throughout Recklinghausen's time at the university he held multiple titles including Dean of the Medical Faculty in 1875/76 and in 1897, as well as rector of the university for the academic year 1883/84. In his Rectorate speech, he dealt with the medical teaching: About the historical development of medical education, its preconditions and its task. During his time at Strasbourg he helped to recruit a number of important people to the school, such as anatomist Wilhelm von Waldeyer-Hartz (1836–1921). Additionally Recklinghausen was one of the founders of the German Society for Pathology in 1884. After his retirement in 1906, he was still working on a comprehensive monograph on the rickets and osteomalacia, which was completed in the year of his death. He is buried next to his wife at the Saint Louis cemetery in Robertsau. The tombstone bears the inscription:

   PROFESSOR OF PATHOLOGICAL ANATOMY, AS
   RESEARCHER AS WELL AS TEACHER PROVEN,
   ESTABLISHED AND OBLIGATORY – A WHOLE MAN

== Contributions ==
In 1855 Recklinghausen wrote his inaugural thesis De pyaemiae theoriis, concerning differing theories on pyaemia.

In 1882 he released a monograph that reviewed previous literature done by Robert William Smith 33 years prior, added two new cases, and characterized the tumors of neurofibromatosis type I or NF-1 as neurofibromas, consisting of an intense commingling of nerve cells and fibrous tissue. NF-1 is sometimes referred to as "von Recklinghausen syndrome".

He gave an account of spina bifida in 1886, improving upon the work of Fulpius from 1641.

In 1889 he coined the term "haemochromatosis", and was the first to provide the link between haemochromatosis and iron accumulation in body tissue. Recklinghausen published his findings in a treatise titled Hämochromatose (1889).

While Gerhard Engel first described the skeletal disorder Osteitis fibrosa cystica, in 1891 Recklinghausen was the first to describe it systematically, and the condition became known as "von Recklinghausen's disease".

He is credited with establishing a method for staining lines of cell junctions with silver, a procedure that led to Julius Friedrich Cohnheim's research on leukocyte migration and inflammation. In a monograph published posthumously in 1910, he coined the term oncosis (derived from ónkos 'swelling'). This term is sometimes used to describe ischemic cell death. In addition, he is credited with performing important studies on the heart and circulation.

== Written works ==
- Die Lymphgefässe und ihre Beziehung zum Bindegewebe [The lymph vessels and their significance in connective tissue] (1862). Here he looked into using silver to show the junction of cells and how the connective tissues communicate through lymphatics.
- Ueber Eiter- und Bindegewebskörperchen in Virchow's Archiv für pathologische Anatomie und Physiologie, und für klinische Medicin, Berlin, [About pus and connective tissue corpuscles in Virchow's Archive of Pathological Anatomy and Physiology, and of Clinical Medicine] (1863), 28: 157-197. Here Recklinghausen described granular cells in the frog mesentery, later named "mast cells" by Paul Ehrlich (1854–1915). Recklinghausen's written work on leucocytes allowed Cohnheim to begin his studies on specifics of the leucocytes migration and inflammation.
- Über die multiplen Fibrome der Haut und ihre Beziehung zu den multiplen Neuromen. Festschrift für Rudolf Virchow. [On Multiple Cutaneous Fibroma and Their Relationship to Multiple Neuromas] Berlin, (1882). (treatise on Recklinghausen's disease). About the multiple fibroids of the skin and their relationship to the multiple neuromas.
- Handbuch der allgemeinen Pathologie des Kresilaufes und der Ernährung. In Theodor Billroth and Georg Albert Lücke, publishers: Deutsche Chirurgie, Lfg. 2, 3, Stuttgart, (1883). Translates to handbook of general pathology of cancer and nutrition.
- Hämochromatose. Tageblatt der Naturforschenden Versammlung (1889), Heidelberg, 1890: 324.
- Ueber Akromegalie. Virchow's Archiv für pathologische Anatomie und Physiologie und für klinische Medicin, Berlin, (1890), 119: 36.
- Demonstration von Knochen mit Tumor bildender Ostitis deformans. Tageblatt der Naturforschenden Versamlung 1889. Heidelberg, (1890), p 321.
- Die fibröse oder deformirende Ostitis, die Osteomalacie und die osteoplastische Carcinose in ihren gegenseitigen Beziehungen. In: Festschrift R Virchow. Berlin: G. Reimer, 1891.

== See also ==
- Timeline of tuberous sclerosis
