= Permanent cell =

Terminally differentiated cell incapable of regeneration

Permanent cells are cells that are incapable of regeneration. These cells are considered to be terminally differentiated and non-proliferative in postnatal life. This includes neurons, heart cells, skeletal muscle cells, lens of the eye. Although these cells are considered permanent in that they neither reproduce nor transform into other cells, this does not mean that the body cannot create new versions of these cells. For instance, structures in the bone marrow produce new red blood cells constantly, while skeletal muscle damage can be repaired by underlying satellite cells, which fuse to become a new skeletal muscle cell.

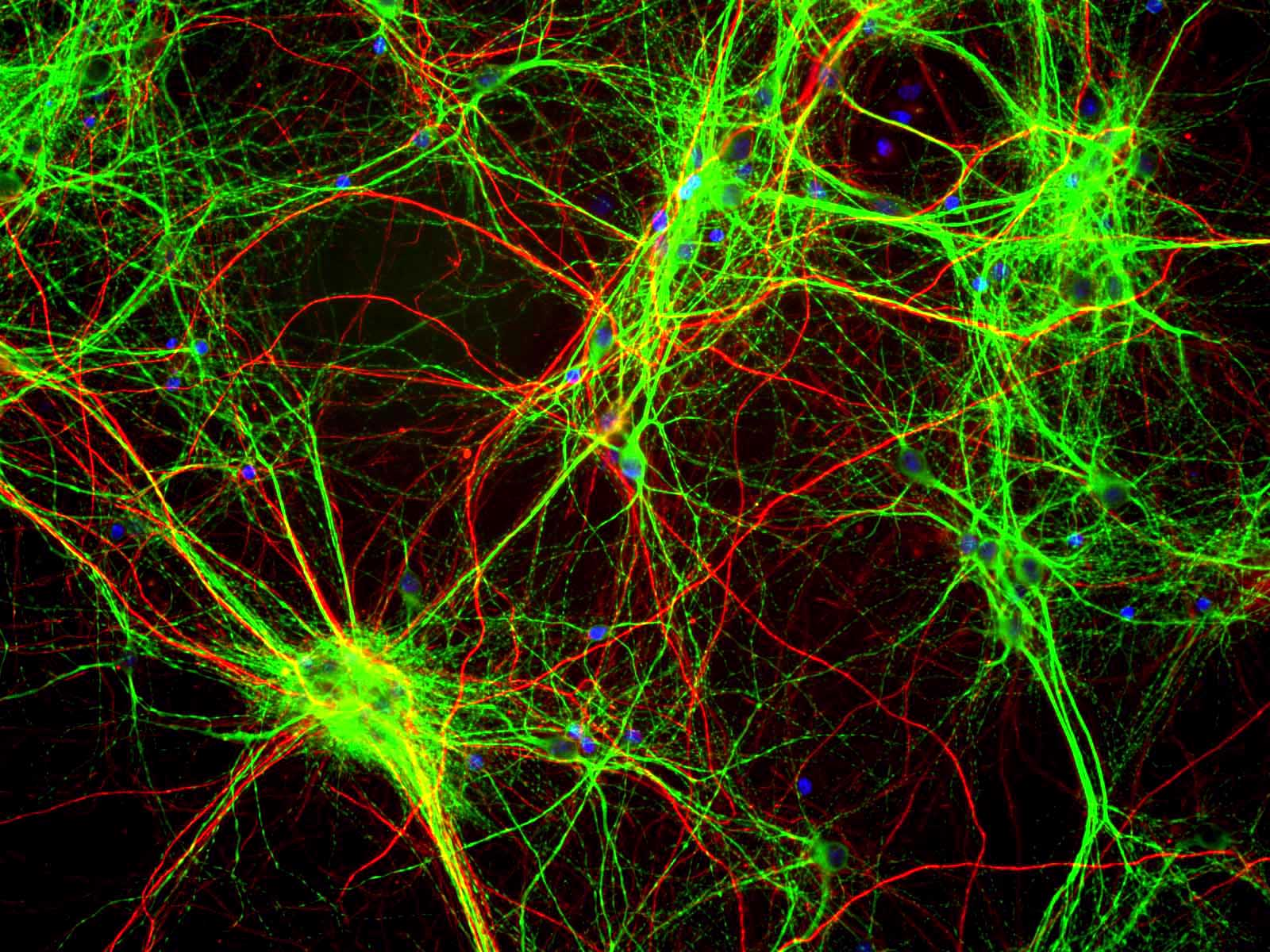
Culture of rat brain cells stained with antibody to MAP2 (green), Neurofilament NF-H (red) and DNA (blue). MAP2 is found in neuronal dendrites, while the neurofilament is found predominantly in axons. Antibodies and image courtesy of EnCor Biotechnology

Disease and virology studies can use permanent cells to maintain cell count and accurately quantify the effects of vaccines. Some embryology studies also use permanent cells to avoid harvesting embryonic cells from pregnant animals; since the cells are permanent, they may be harvested at a later age when an animal is fully developed.

== See also ==
- Labile cells, which multiply constantly throughout life
- Stable cells, which only multiply when receiving external stimulus to do so
