= Pyknosis =

Irreversible condensation of chromatin in the nucleus of a dying cell

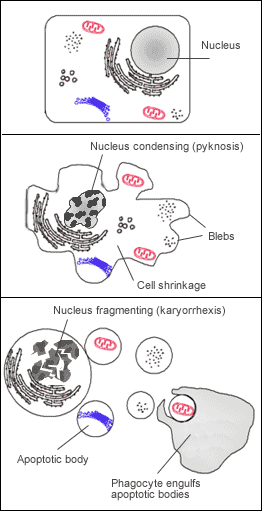
Apoptosis

Pyknosis, or karyopyknosis, is the irreversible condensation of chromatin in the nucleus of a cell undergoing necrosis or apoptosis. It is typically followed by karyorrhexis, the fragmentation of the nucleus.

The term derives from Ancient Greek πυκνός meaning "thick, closed or condensed". Pyknosis also occurs as part of normal cell maturation in certain blood cells.

== Occurrence ==
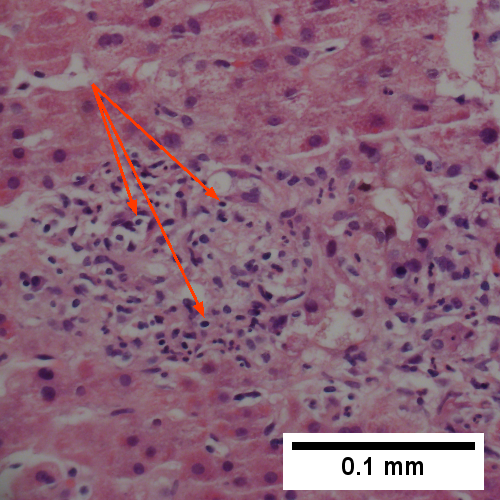
Micrograph of an infarct in the biliary tract, with pyknotic nuclei (arrows) (400x).

In erythropoiesis, the maturing metarubricyte condenses its nucleus before expelling it to form a reticulocyte. In granulopoiesis, the developing neutrophil condenses its nucleus into several connected lobes, which remain in the cell until its death.

Pyknotic nuclei are also commonly seen in the zona reticularis of the adrenal gland and in the keratinocytes of the outermost layer of parakeratinised epithelium.

== Mechanism ==
Pyknosis represents irreversible nuclear condensation in a cell undergoing apoptosis or necrosis. Two main types are described: nucleolytic pyknosis, which occurs during apoptosis (programmed cell death), and anucleolytic pyknosis, which occurs during necrosis.

Necrosis is a regulated form of cell death triggered by toxins, infections, or other acute stressors. Such stress leads to swelling and morphological changes of cellular organelles, ultimately compromising the cell membrane.

Pyknosis is characterized by nuclear shrinkage and dense chromatin, which ultimately fragments in karyorrhexis. Karyorrhexis refers to the subsequent fragmentation of this condensed nucleus and cleavage of chromatin.

== In apoptosis and necrosis ==
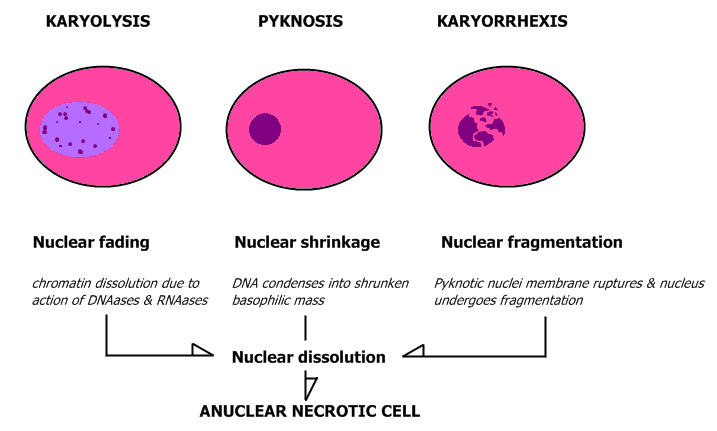
Morphological characteristics of pyknosis and other forms of nuclear destruction

Apoptosis is characterized by nuclear condensation, shrinking of the cell, and blebbing of the nuclear and cell membrane, while necrosis is characterized by nuclear condensation, swelling of the cell, and breaks in the cell membrane. Both necrosis and apoptosis are regulated by a few of the same proteins: caspase-activated DNase (CAD), endonuclease G and DNase I. Pyknosis occurs in both an apoptotic and a necrotic cell. Pyknosis in an apoptotic cell is identified by nuclear condensation, chromatin fragmentation, and the formation of a few large clumps which are enveloped by apoptotic extracellular vesicles, which are to be released when the cell dies. Pyknosis in a necrotic cell is identified by nuclear condensation and fragmentation into small clumps that will be dissolved later in the process of the necrotic cell’s death. Consequently, pyknosis can be distinguished into two types, nucleolytic pyknosis (apoptotic cells) and anucleolytic pyknosis (necrotic cells).

== Types ==
=== Nucleolytic ===
Nucleolytic pyknosis, which can also be referred to as apoptotic pyknosis, involves three main events. These are disrupting the nuclear membrane, the condensing of the chromatin, and lastly, nuclear cleavage/fragmentation. Throughout these events the cell shrinks in size and the cell membrane undergoes blebbing, which is the forming of membrane bulges across the exterior-facing surface of the cell membrane. During the first event (the disruption of the nuclear membrane), several enzymes are used to cleave the proteins found in the nuclear membrane. These enzymes, caspase-3 and caspase-6, both target and cleave nuclear membrane proteins, including NUP153, LAP2, and B1 (proteins that are used for membrane structure and molecular transport). This cleavage, in turn, results in a disruption of the interior of the membrane, which is an initiating factor for chromatin condensation (the second event of nucleolytic pyknosis). This is due to the fact that caspase-3 cleaves Acinus, which has DNA/RNA binding domains and ATPase activity to initiate the condensation of chromatin.

=== Anucleolytic ===
Anucleolytic pyknosis, which can also be referred to as necrotic pyknosis, involves the swelling of the cell, followed by the separation of the nuclear membrane from chromatin, the eventual collapse of both the nuclear membrane and chromatin, and finally the cell membrane ruptures (the cell dies). One protein that plays a significant role in necrotic pyknosis is the barrier-to-autointegration factor (BAF). The function of BAF is to facilitate the tethering of chromatin to the membrane of the nucleus, however in the case of necrosis, when BAF is phosphorylated, it will initiate the dissociation between the nuclear membrane and the condensed chromatin. As a result, the nuclear membrane will collapse onto the condensed chromatin. Thus, the phosphorylation of BAF is a critical marker of necrotic pyknosis.

== Detection ==
Various techniques are used to detect/observe pyknosis. These techniques also help to differentiate between apoptotic or necrotic cells. The techniques are identified and described as follows:

=== Cellular staining ===
When stains and dyes are applied to locate pyknotic cells in a tissue sample, the cell becomes easily identifiable. The stains/dyes target the nuclear and blebbed fragments of a pyknotic cell, making them dark (light contrast) and more readily seen when the sample is placed under a light microscope. Fluorescence microscopy and flow cytometry also use staining (fluorescent stains) to target the DNA/nuclear fragments of cells. The fluorescent staining creates a contrast between normal cell DNA and pyknotic cell DNA, because pyknotic cell nuclear material is condensed.

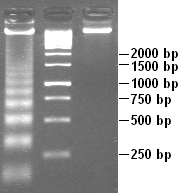
Apoptotic DNA laddering visualized in agarose gel. DNA from cells treated with an apoptotic inducing substance (left). A 1 kb marker (middle). Untreated cell DNA (right)

=== Gel electrophoresis ===
Gel electrophoresis is a standard technique that is frequently used to visualize DNA fragmentation (forming a ladder-like image on the gel), which is a characteristic of apoptosis and is associated with nuclear condensation (which characterizes pyknosis). Therefore, when referring to apoptosis, this technique is known as DNA laddering. Gel electrophoresis is also used to visualize the random DNA fragmentation of necrosis, which forms a smear on the gel.

=== DNA assays ===
Various assays of DNA fragmentation or condensation include the APO single-stranded DNA (ssDNA) assay which detects damaged DNA of cells undergoing apoptosis or necrosis, TUNEL assay which is used to locally find DNA strand breaks (DSBs), and ISEL.

ISEL (in-situ labeling technique) is a labeling/tagging technique of apoptotic or necrotic cells. ISEL specifically targets unfragmented DNA that has condensed into a nucleosome structure.

The APO ssDNA assay detects apoptotic cells by using an antibody that specifically binds to the ssDNA, which is accumulated during apoptosis as a result of DNA fragmentation. Therefore, the presence of ssDNA is an indicator of DNA damage in the apoptotic cell. For the assay process, cells are fixed (with e.g., formamide), and these cells then undergo incubation (at a predetermined temperature), which subjects the DNA to thermal denaturation and exposes the ssDNA. Next, the cells are incubated with an ssDNA-specific antibody along with a fluorescently labeled secondary antibody. The fluorescence amounts as a measure of apoptosis which can then be quantified using flow cytometry.

The TUNEL assay, otherwise known as the terminal deoxynucleotidyl transferase dUTP nick-end labeling assay, is a technique that measures DNA damage and breakage during apoptosis. During apoptosis, DNA fragmentation exposes numerous 3’OH ends, that are labeled with modified deoxy-uridine triphosphate (dUTP) by the TUNEL reaction. Then, this modified dUTP can be identified with specific fluorescent antibodies which can identify modified nucleotides or by using tagged nucleotides themselves. Flow cytometry can then be used to quantify fluorescence intensity, and thus provide a measure of apoptosis.

=== Caspase activity ===
As mentioned above, caspase proteins, which are protease enzymes, promote DNA condensation and fragmentation via the caspase (or proteolytic) cascade. These caspase proteins include, for example, caspase 9, caspase 6, caspase 7, and caspase 3. The caspase cascade directly activates caspase-activated DNase (CAD) which initiates DNA fragmentation into smaller pieces resulting in chromatin condensation. The biochemical techniques used to detect caspase activity include ELISA and fluorometric and colorimetric assays.

== Clinical significance ==
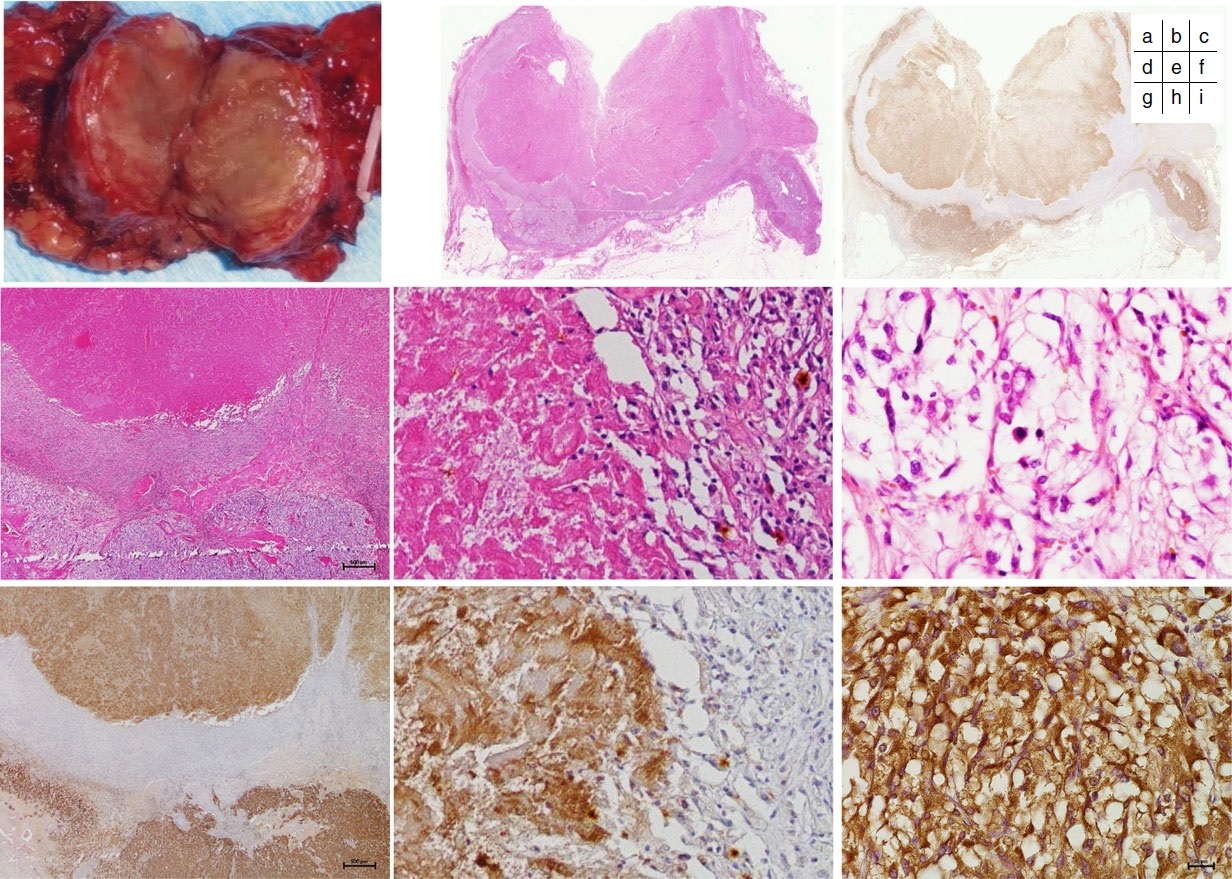
Histopathology of adrenal pheochromocytoma showing coagulative necrosis and pyknotic nuclei.

Pyknosis is a stage in the apoptotic or necrotic cell death pathways. It is an important stage that involves fragmentation and condensation of damaged DNA/chromatin. Without it, the apoptotic or necrotic cell death pathways would be interrupted. This disruption, in turn, may prompt the improper destruction or removal of a cell with damaged elements as well as other related issues. These issues include cell accumulation and uncontrolled cell growth, which results in the formation of cancerous and abnormal tissue masses known as tumors. Therefore, being able to observe or identify when a cell is pyknotic (which may indicate that the cell is undergoing apoptosis or necrosis) and if it then successfully undergoes apoptosis or necrosis, may be crucial in determining if the cell will undergo uncontrolled cell growth and contribute to the formation of a tumor.

== See also ==
- Apoptosis
- Necrosis
- Karyolysis
- Karyorrhexis
