= Heinrich von Recklinghausen =

German physician

Heinrich von Recklinghausen (17 April 1867 – 12 December 1942) was a German physician and scientist from Würzburg.

After receiving his medical doctorate in 1895, he worked as an assistant in several hospitals. In 1902 he moved to Bern, where he worked in the physiological institute of Hugo Kronecker (1839–1914). During World War I he was a military physician in Strasbourg, and afterwards performed scientific research in Heidelberg and Munich. He was the son of the pathologist Friedrich Daniel von Recklinghausen (1833–1910).

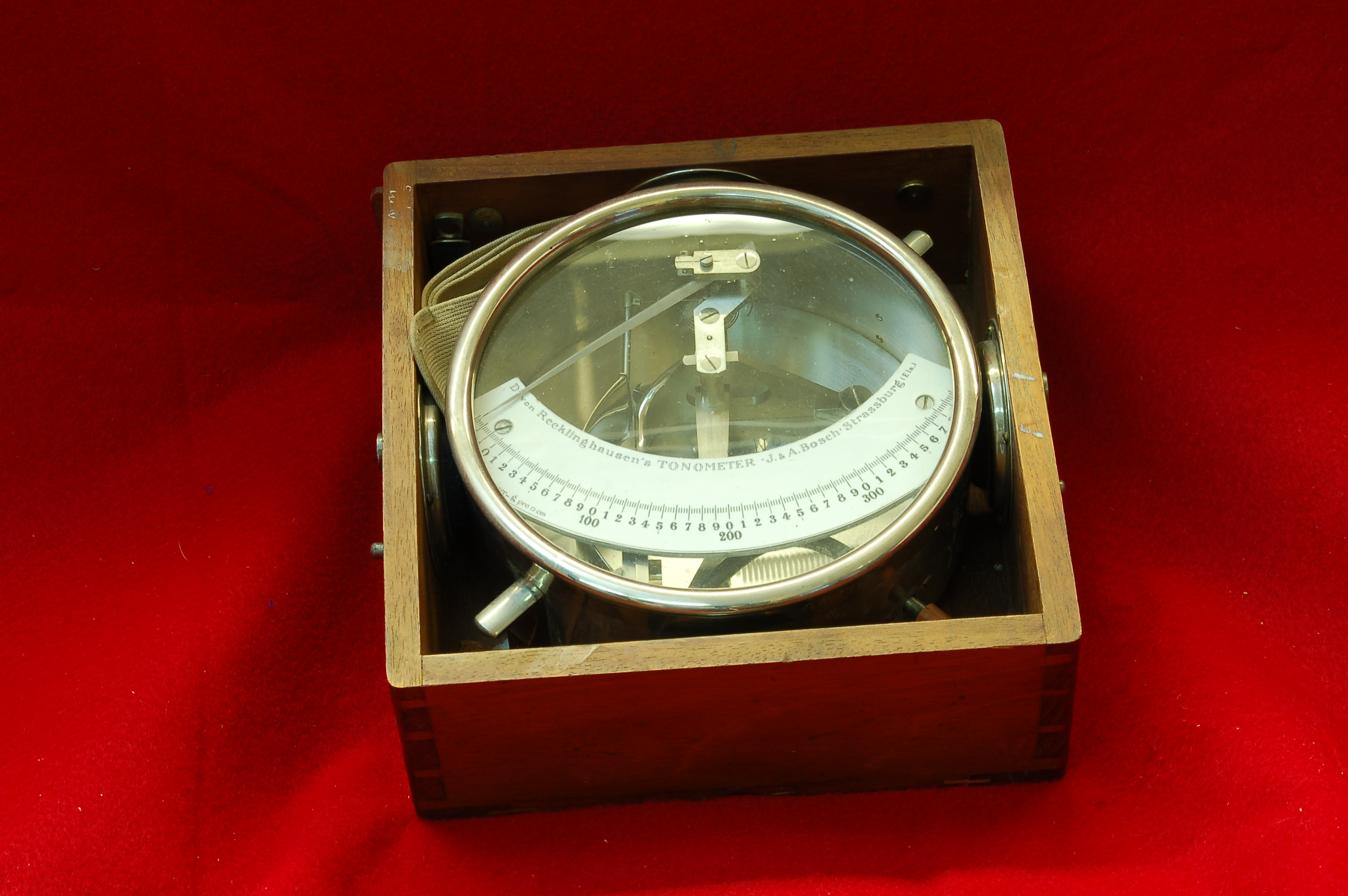
Von Recklinghausen Oscillotonometer in the Collection of the National Museum of Health and Medicine, Silver Spring, MD.

Recklinghausen is primarily remembered for his study of blood pressure, and contributions made in the science of blood pressure measurement. He is credited for making improvements to Scipione Riva-Rocci's (1863–1937) sphygmomanometer by increasing the size of the pressure cuff from 5 centimeters (2.0 in) to 10 centimeters (3.9 in). During the 1930s he devised an oscillo-tonometer, a device used to measure systolic and diastolic blood pressure. It consisted of a mechanical amplification system connected to an oscillating needle and dial, two cuffs (a 5 cm cuff overlapping a 10 cm cuff) being connected to single inflation bulb, a control lever, a release valve and two tambours (one being connected to the atmosphere and the other to the lower cuff). With Recklinghausen's oscillotonometer, a stethoscope was not needed to listen for Korotkoff sounds; they were instead represented as oscillations of a needle.

For much of his life, Recklinghausen maintained an avid interest in philosophy and metaphysics. Although he published no books on these subjects, he left behind copious notes concerning his beliefs, and maintained an ongoing correspondence with philosophers Heinrich Rickert (1863–1936), Paul Hensel (1860–1930), and Albert Schweitzer (1875–1965).

== Written works ==
- Ueber Blutdruckmessung beim Menschen (Blood Pressure Measurement in Humans), Arch Exp Pathol Pharmakol 46 (1901).
- Unblutige Blutdruckmessung (Blood Pressure Measurement), Arch Exp Pathol Pharmakol 55 (1906).
- Was wir durch die Pulsdruckkurve und durch die Pulsdruckamplitude über den großen Kreislauf erfahren, Arch Exp. Pathol 56 (1906).
- Neue Apparate zur Messung des arteriellen Blutdrucks beim Menschen (New Apparatuses for Measurement of Arterial Blood Pressure in Humans), Münchn Med Wochenschr 60 (1913).
- Gliedermechanik und Lähmungsprothesen (Mechanics and Paralysis Prostheses), two volumes, Berlin 1920.
- Eine neue Pumpe zur Blutdruckmessung am Menschen (A New Pump for Blood Pressure Measurement in Humans}, Dtsch Arch Klin Med 146 (1925).
- Rechtsprofil und Linksprofil in der Zeichenkunst der alten Ägypter, Z Ägypt Sprache Altertumskunde 63 (1927).
- Druckschriftreform. Zwei Abhandlungen zur Fraktur-Antiqua-Frage, Mitt Akad Wiss Erforschung Pflege Deutschtum (Deutsche Akademie; two booklets (1929)
- Neue Wege der Blutdruckmessung (New Methods of Blood Pressure Measurement), Berlin 1931
- Blutdruck-Meßmanschette mit Hilfen zur Aufbringung am Oberarm (Blood Pressure Measuring Seal with Assistance for Application at the Upper Arm), Münchn Med Wochenschr 79 (1932).
- Blutdruckmessung und Kreislauf in den Arterien des Menschen (Blood Pressure Measurement and Circulation in Arteries), Dresden 1940.
