= Liquefactive necrosis =

Unplanned cell death in which the remains form a liquid mass

Liquefactive necrosis (or colliquative necrosis) is a type of necrosis which results in a transformation of the tissue into a liquid viscous mass. Often it is associated with focal bacterial or fungal infections, and can also manifest as one of the symptoms of an internal chemical burn. In liquefactive necrosis, the affected cell is completely digested by hydrolytic enzymes, resulting in a soft, circumscribed lesion consisting of pus and the fluid remains of necrotic tissue. Dead leukocytes will remain as a creamy yellow pus. After the removal of cell debris by white blood cells, a fluid filled space is left. It is generally associated with abscess formation and is commonly found in the central nervous system.

== In the brain ==
Due to excitotoxicity, hypoxic death of cells within the central nervous system can result in liquefactive necrosis. This is a process in which lysosomes turn tissues into pus as a result of lysosomal release of digestive enzymes. Loss of tissue architecture means that the tissue can be liquefied. This process is not associated with bacterial action or infection. Ultimately, in a living patient most necrotic cells and their contents disappear.

The affected area is soft with liquefied centre containing necrotic debris. Later, a cyst wall is formed.

Microscopically, the cystic space contains necrotic cell debris and macrophages filled with phagocytosed material. The cyst wall is formed by proliferating capillaries, inflammatory cells, and gliosis (proliferating glial cells) in the case of brain and proliferating fibroblasts in the case of abscess cavities. Brain cells have a large amount of digestive enzymes (hydrolases). These enzymes cause the neural tissue to become soft and liquefy.

== In the lung ==
Liquefactive necrosis can also occur in the lung, especially in the context of lung abscesses.

== Infection ==
Liquefactive necrosis can also take place due to certain infections. Neutrophils, fighting off a bacterium, will release hydrolytic enzymes which will also attack the surrounding tissues.
