= Karyolysis =

Dissolution of the chromatin in a dying cell

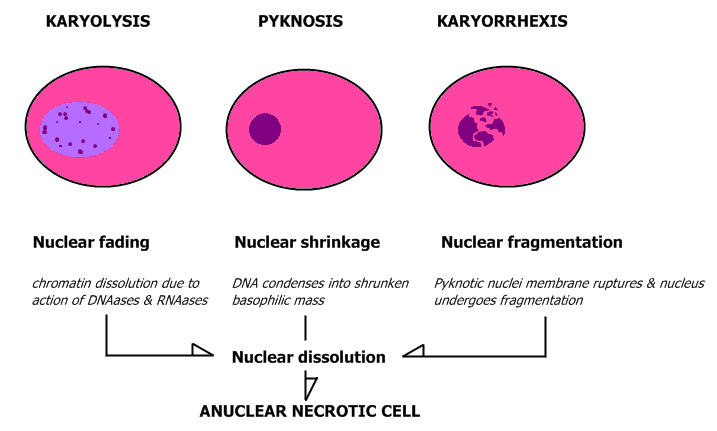
Morphological characteristics of karyolysis and other forms of nuclear destruction.

Karyolysis (from Greek κάρυον karyon—"kernel, seed, or nucleus", and λύσις lysis from λύειν lyein, "to separate") is the complete dissolution of chromatin in a dying cell caused by enzymatic degradation through endonucleases. Following karyolysis, the entire cell typically stains uniformly with eosin. Karyolysis represents the final step in the process of necrosis, a form of cellular injury in which living tissue undergoes irreversible damage through premature cell death. Unlike apoptosis, which is a regulated and programmed process, necrosis is generally triggered by external factors. In apoptosis, after karyorrhexis, the nucleus usually fragments into apoptotic bodies, whereas in necrosis karyolysis leads to complete nuclear dissolution.

Disintegration of the cytoplasm, pyknosis of nuclei, and karyolysis of transitional cells may be observed in urine from both healthy individuals and from those with malignant cells. Cells with a partially preserved cytoplasmic tag were first described by Papanicolaou and are sometimes referred to as "comet" or "decoy" cells. Because these may exhibit features resembling malignancy, it is important that they be correctly identified.

== Triggers ==
Necrosis can be initiated by several factors. A common example is ischemia, or reduced blood flow, in which the diminished oxygen and nutrient supply impairs cellular respiration and energy production. This leads to ATP depletion, accumulation of metabolic waste, and ultimately cell death. An instance of this process is myocardial infarction, where a blood clot obstructs the coronary arteries, resulting in necrosis of heart muscle cells.

Other triggers include physical trauma (such as crush injuries, burns, and frostbite), viral or bacterial infections, chemical or toxicant exposure, immune reactions, radiation, and oxidative stress. Although the causes vary, they share a common outcome: disruption of cellular homeostasis leading to premature cell death.

Necrosis is characterized by distinctive nuclear changes that occur in three stages: pyknosis, karyorrhexis, and karyolysis.

Pyknosis (from the Greek pyknos (πυκνός), meaning "dense" or "thick") is the first step of nuclear change in necrosis, in which the chromatin condenses into a shrunken, hyperchromatic mass. Microscopically, this appears as a compact, dark nucleus, reflecting the dense appearance implied by the term. Unlike the later stages, pyknosis is not unique to necrosis; it also occurs in apoptosis and in certain normal differentiation processes, such as the maturation of erythrocytes.

=== Karyorrhexis ===
Following pyknosis, karyorrhexis (from the Greek karyo- (κάρυον), meaning "nut" or "nucleus," and rhexis (ῥῆξις), meaning "bursting") occurs, in which the nucleus fragments as the nuclear envelope breaks down and condensed chromatin disperses into the cytoplasm. In apoptosis, this process is highly regulated: the nucleus fragments into membrane-bound apoptotic bodies that are engulfed by phagocytic cells, preventing the release of intracellular contents and avoiding inflammation. In necrosis, however, karyorrhexis is disorganized and unregulated. Nuclear fragments scatter chaotically through the cytoplasm, and unlike in apoptosis, there is no mechanism for their controlled disposal. Several factors contribute to the uncontrolled nature of necrotic karyorrhexis, including loss of regulatory mechanisms, disruption of the cellular energy supply, uncontrolled enzyme activity, structural damage to the nuclear envelope, and inflammatory responses. The latter is particularly important, as the leakage of nuclear material and other intracellular contents into the extracellular space can promote inflammation and trigger necrosis in neighboring cells, amplifying tissue damage.

== Karyolysis ==
The final step in the necrotic pathway is karyolysis (from the Greek karyo- (κάρυον), meaning "nut" or "nucleus," and lysis (λύσις), meaning "dissolution" or "loosening"). During this stage, the nuclear fragments produced by karyorrhexis are degraded, and necrosis concludes with the complete disintegration of the cell. This breakdown, sometimes referred to as cytoplasmic dissolution or ghost cell formation, leaves behind cytoplasmic debris and inflammatory mediators in the extracellular space. Karyolysis is marked by a structural collapse in which nuclear proteins, chromatin, and cytoskeletal components are degraded. The cell membrane often becomes porous or ruptures, releasing intracellular contents into the surrounding environment. These contents act as damage-associated molecular patterns (DAMPs) that serve as “danger signals” and stimulate inflammation. Immune cells such as neutrophils and macrophages are recruited to clear necrotic debris, but the absence of apoptotic signaling often results in inefficient clearance. The inflammatory mediators released by these cells, including cytokines and ROS, can further damage surrounding tissue. If clearance is delayed or incomplete, persistent debris may prolong inflammation and contribute to fibrosis. The outcome of karyolysis and subsequent tissue remodeling depends on the organ affected. In the brain, necrosis commonly results in liquefactive necrosis, producing soft, liquid-like tissue. In the heart and kidneys, coagulative necrosis leaves behind a “ghost” framework of the affected cells. In some tissues, such as the liver, viable surrounding cells may regenerate necrotic areas; however, in the heart and brain, necrotic regions are typically replaced by collagen and non-functional scar tissue. Karyolysis also occurs in necroptosis, although through a distinct mechanism. In necrosis, it follows chaotic enzymatic degradation of nuclear material after lysosomal membrane permeabilization (LMP), driven by external stressors such as trauma or ischemia. In necroptosis, the same terminal event of karyolysis is embedded in a regulated signaling cascade controlled by the RIPK1–RIPK3–MLKL axis. While both necrosis and necroptosis release intracellular contents that drive inflammation, the regulated nature of necroptosis has attracted interest as a therapeutic target in conditions where excessive or uncontrolled karyolysis contributes to pathology. W

== Enzymes ==
Several enzymes are central to the process of karyolysis, including deoxyribonucleases (DNases), ribonucleases (RNases), proteases, and lysozymes.

DNases are among the first to act. Normally confined to lysosomes or released by immune cells such as macrophages and neutrophils, they maintain cellular homeostasis by breaking down old or damaged DNA. During necrosis, their unregulated release fragments nuclear DNA, degrading the compacted chromatin that remains after pyknosis and karyorrhexis and producing the “dissolved” appearance of nuclei under the microscope. RNases, often originating from the same sources, operate in parallel by degrading RNA molecules, thereby contributing further to the loss of nuclear integrity.

As nucleic acids are dismantled, proteases begin to act on structural proteins. Cathepsins are released from damaged lysosomes, while calpains and other cytoplasmic proteases are activated by calcium influx. These enzymes degrade nuclear proteins such as histones, lamins, and scaffold components, dismantling the nuclear framework and facilitating chromatin dissolution.

Finally, lysozymes, which usually function in immune defense by degrading bacterial walls and cellular debris, contribute by breaking down nuclear-associated proteins. Their activity also enhances the effectiveness of DNases and RNases, reinforcing the progressive disintegration of nuclear material. Together, these enzyme systems drive the complete dissolution of the nucleus characteristic of karyolysis.

== Mechanisms of karyolysis ==
Mechanisms of these enzymatic reactions often link to lysosomal membrane permeabilization (LMP). LMP occurs under stressed conditions, releasing hydrolytic enzymes from the internal portion of the lysosome into the cytosol. Various factors, such as oxidative stress, exposure to lysosomotropic agents, or the action of specific lipids, can spur LMP. Once hydrolytic enzymes–DNases, RNases, and proteases–are freed from lysosomes, they translocate to the nucleus. Without lysosomal sequestration, the active enzymes can unintentionally and chaotically degrade nuclear components. In conjunction with other karyolytic mechanisms, the concerted action of these enzymes causes the nucleus to lose structural integrity and staining properties, a hallmark of karyolysis in microscopy.

Specifically, it is DNA cleavage, in which DNases cut chromatin into smaller fragments until eventually reducing it to mononucleotides or oligonucleotides, contributing to the "ghost" nucleus appearance since degraded DNA is no longer detectable with basic dyes. Another case is proteases, which target histones for degradation; histones function to bind and protect DNA, so degradation augments DNases enzymatic attack due to the lack of histone protection. Additionally, proteins like nuclear lamins–typically providing structural support to the nuclear envelope–are degrading, contributing to the disintegration of the nuclear structure. Finally, RNases target ribosomal (rRNA) and messenger RNA (mRNA) within the nucleus in RNA degradation, completing the dissolution of nuclear contents. While the mechanisms above reflect the general sequence of events making up karyolysis, these enzymatic reactions are dynamic and interdependent, with many processes occurring concurrently. The release of lysosomal enzymes occurs first and triggers multiple enzymatic reactions due to the chaotic release of typically contained enzymes. DNases and RNases act on DNA and RNA contemporaneously, while proteases also work to degrade histones and other structural proteins.

== Additional images ==
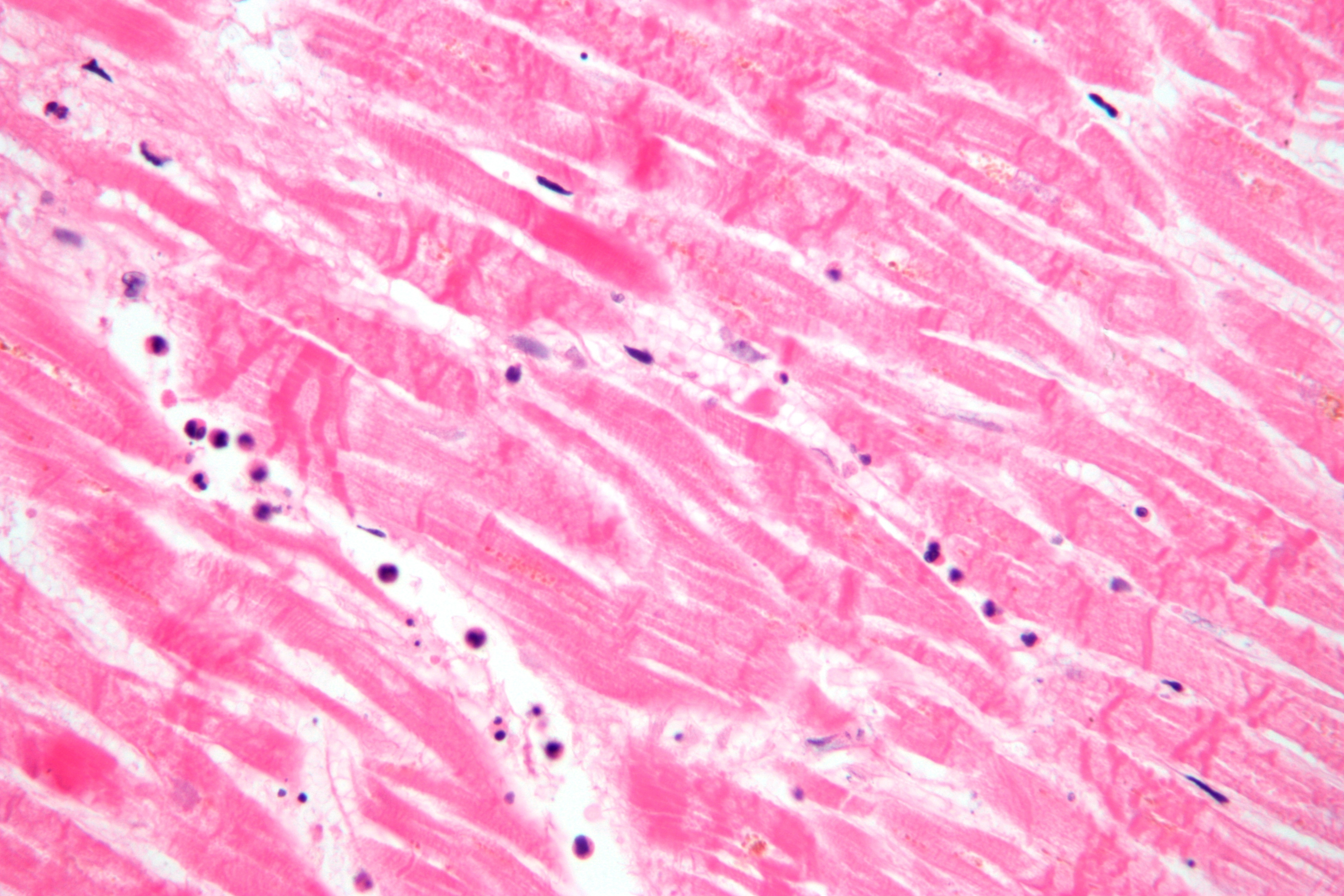
Micrograph showing karyolysis and contraction band necrosis in an individual that had a myocardial infarction (heart attack).

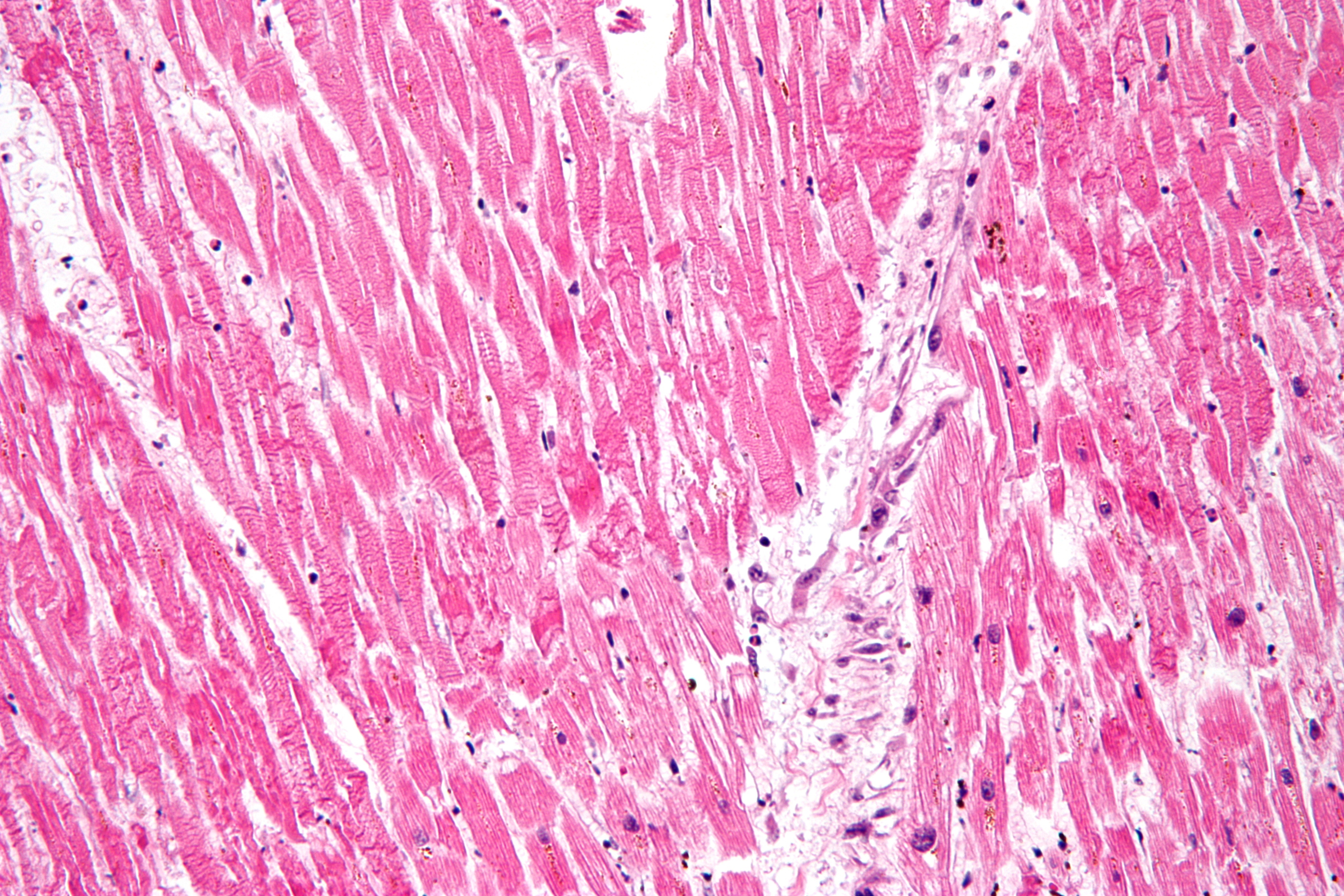
Micrograph showing karyolysis and contraction band necrosis (left of image) and ischemic (nucleated) cardiac myocytes (right of image) in an individual that had a myocardial infarction.

== See also ==
- Apoptosis
- Necrosis
- Pyknosis
- Karyorrhexis
