= Necrosis =

Unprogrammed cell death caused by external cell injury

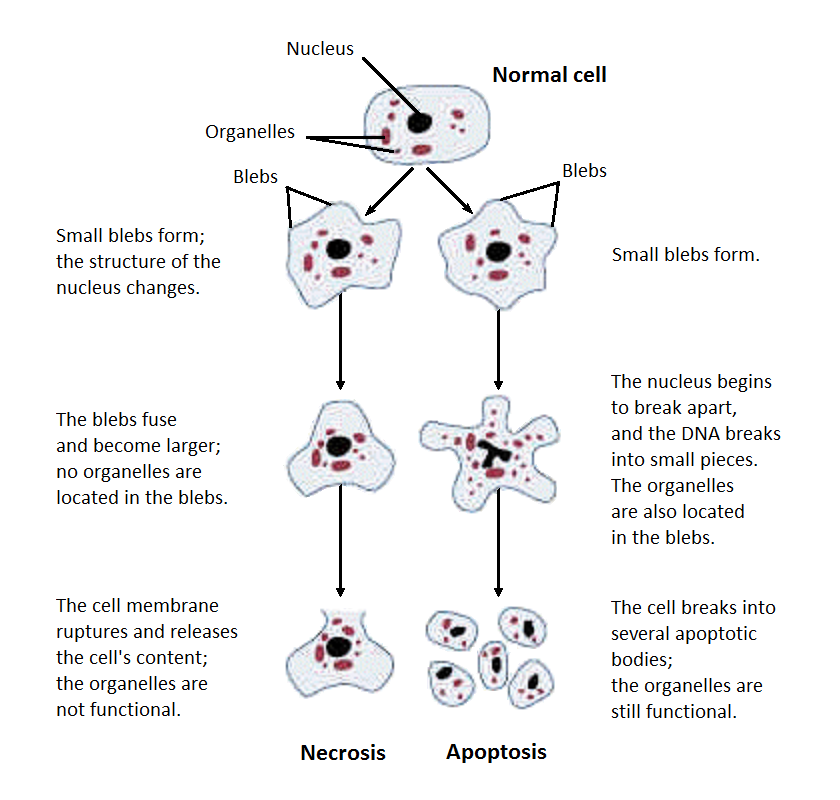
Structural changes of cells undergoing necrosis and apoptosis

Necrosis (from Ancient Greek νέκρωσις (nékrōsis) 'death') is a form of cell injury which results in the premature death of cells in living tissue by autolysis. The term "necrosis" came about in the mid-19th century and is commonly attributed to German pathologist Rudolf Virchow, who is often regarded as one of the founders of modern pathology. Necrosis is caused by factors external to the cell or tissue, such as infection, or trauma which result in the unregulated digestion of cell components. In contrast, apoptosis is a naturally occurring programmed and targeted cause of cellular death. While apoptosis often provides beneficial effects to the organism, necrosis is almost always detrimental and can be fatal.

Cellular death due to necrosis does not follow the apoptotic signal transduction pathway, but rather various receptors are activated and result in the loss of cell membrane integrity and an uncontrolled release of products of cell death into the extracellular space. This initiates an inflammatory response in the surrounding tissue, which attracts leukocytes and nearby phagocytes which eliminate the dead cells by phagocytosis. However, microbial damaging substances released by leukocytes would create collateral damage to surrounding tissues. This excess collateral damage inhibits the healing process. Thus, untreated necrosis results in a build-up of decomposing dead tissue and cell debris at or near the site of the cell death. A classic example is gangrene. For this reason, it is often necessary to remove necrotic tissue surgically, a procedure known as debridement.

== Classification ==
Structural signs that indicate irreversible cell injury and the progression of necrosis include dense clumping and progressive disruption of genetic material, and disruption to membranes of cells and organelles.

=== Morphological patterns ===
There are six distinctive morphological patterns of necrosis:

1. Coagulative necrosis is characterized by the formation of a gelatinous (gel-like) substance in dead tissues in which the architecture of the tissue is maintained, and can be observed by light microscopy. Coagulation occurs as a result of protein denaturation, causing albumin to transform into a firm and opaque state. This pattern of necrosis is typically seen in hypoxic (low-oxygen) environments, such as infarction. Coagulative necrosis occurs primarily in tissues such as the kidney, heart and adrenal glands. Severe ischemia most commonly causes necrosis of this form.
2. Liquefactive necrosis (or colliquative necrosis), in contrast to coagulative necrosis, is characterized by the digestion of dead cells to form a viscous liquid mass. This is typical of bacterial, or sometimes fungal, infections because of their ability to stimulate an inflammatory response. The necrotic liquid mass is frequently creamy yellow due to the presence of dead leukocytes and is commonly known as pus. Hypoxic infarcts in the brain presents as this type of necrosis, because the brain contains little connective tissue but high amounts of digestive enzymes and lipids, and cells therefore can be readily digested by their own enzymes.
3. Gangrenous necrosis can be considered a type of coagulative necrosis that resembles mummified tissue. It is characteristic of ischemia of lower limb and the gastrointestinal tracts. Both dry gangrene and gas gangrene can lead to this type of necrosis. If superimposed infection of dead tissues occurs, then liquefactive necrosis ensues (wet gangrene).
4. Caseous necrosis can be considered a combination of coagulative and liquefactive necrosis, typically caused by mycobacteria (e.g. tuberculosis), fungi and some foreign substances. The necrotic tissue appears as white and friable, like clumped cheese. Dead cells disintegrate but are not completely digested, leaving granular particles. Microscopic examination shows amorphous granular debris enclosed within a distinctive inflammatory border. Some granulomas contain this pattern of necrosis.
5. Fat necrosis is specialized necrosis of fat tissue, resulting from the action of activated lipases on fatty tissues such as the pancreas. In the pancreas it leads to acute pancreatitis, a condition where the pancreatic enzymes leak out into the peritoneal cavity, and liquefy the membrane by splitting the triglyceride esters into fatty acids through fat saponification. Calcium, magnesium, or sodium may bind to these lesions to produce a chalky-white substance. The calcium deposits are microscopically distinctive and may be large enough to be visible on radiographic examinations. To the naked eye, calcium deposits appear as gritty white flecks.
6. Fibrinoid necrosis is a special form of necrosis usually caused by immune-mediated vascular damage. It is marked by complexes of antigen and antibodies, referred to as immune complexes deposited within arterial walls together with fibrin.

=== Other clinical classifications of necrosis ===
1. There are also very specific forms of necrosis such as gangrene (term used in clinical practices for limbs which have had severe hypoxia), gummatous necrosis (due to spirochaetal infections) and hemorrhagic necrosis (due to the blockage of venous drainage of an organ or tissue).
2. Myonecrosis is the death of individual muscle fibres due to injury, hypoxia, or infection. Common causes include spontaneous diabetic myonecrosis (a.k.a. diabetic muscle infarction) and clostridial myonecrosis (a.k.a. gas gangrene).
3. Some spider bites may lead to necrosis. In the United States, only spider bites from the brown recluse spider (genus Loxosceles) reliably progress to necrosis. In other countries, spiders of the same genus, such as the Chilean recluse in South America, are also known to cause necrosis. Claims that yellow sac spiders and hobo spiders possess necrotic venom have not been substantiated.
4. In blind mole rats (genus Spalax), the process of necrosis replaces the role of the systematic apoptosis normally used in many organisms. Low oxygen conditions, such as those common in blind mole rats' burrows, usually cause cells to undergo apoptosis. In adaptation to higher tendency of cell death, blind mole rats evolved a mutation in the tumor suppressor protein p53 (which is also used in humans) to prevent cells from undergoing apoptosis. Human cancer patients have similar mutations, and blind mole rats were thought to be more susceptible to cancer because their cells cannot undergo apoptosis. However, after a specific amount of time (within 3 days according to a study conducted at the University of Rochester), the cells in blind mole rats release interferon-beta (which the immune system normally uses to counter viruses) in response to over-proliferation of cells caused by the suppression of apoptosis. In this case, the interferon-beta triggers cells to undergo necrosis, and this mechanism also kills cancer cells in blind mole rats. Because of tumor suppression mechanisms such as this, blind mole rats and other spalacids are resistant to cancer.

== Causes ==
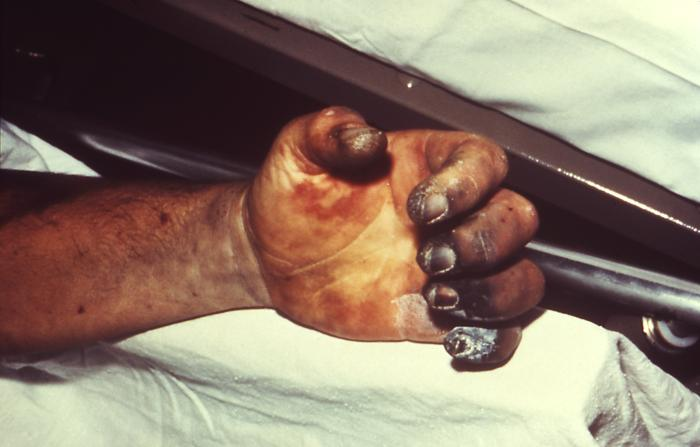
Hand necrosis from bubonic plague

Necrosis may occur due to external or internal factors.

=== External factors ===
External factors may involve mechanical trauma (physical damage to the body which causes cellular breakdown), electric shock, damage to blood vessels (which may disrupt blood supply to associated tissue), and ischemia. Thermal effects (extremely high or low temperature) can often result in necrosis due to the disruption of cells, especially in bone cells.

Necrosis can also result from chemical trauma, with alkaline and acidic compounds causing liquefactive and coagulative necrosis, respectively, in affected tissues. The severity of such cases varies significantly based on multiple factors, including the compound concentration, type of tissue affected, and the extent of chemical exposure.

In frostbite, crystals form, increasing the pressure of remaining tissue and fluid causing the cells to burst. Under extreme conditions tissues and cells may die through an unregulated process of membrane and cytosol destruction.

=== Internal factors ===
Internal factors causing necrosis include: trophoneurotic disorders (diseases that occur due to defective nerve action in a part of an organ which results in failure of nutrition); injury and paralysis of nerve cells. Pancreatic enzymes (lipases) are the major cause of fat necrosis.

Necrosis can be activated by components of the immune system, such as the complement system; bacterial toxins; activated natural killer cells; and peritoneal macrophages. Pathogen-induced necrosis programs in cells with immunological barriers (intestinal mucosa) may alleviate invasion of pathogens through surfaces affected by inflammation. Toxins and pathogens may cause necrosis; toxins such as snake venoms may inhibit enzymes and cause cell death. Necrotic wounds have also resulted from the stings of Vespa mandarinia.

Pathological conditions are characterized by inadequate secretion of cytokines. Nitric oxide (NO) and reactive oxygen species (ROS) are also accompanied by intense necrotic death of cells. A classic example of a necrotic condition is ischemia which leads to a drastic depletion of oxygen, glucose, and other trophic factors and induces massive necrotic death of endothelial cells and non-proliferating cells of surrounding tissues (neurons, cardiomyocytes, renal cells, etc.). Recent cytological data indicates that necrotic death occurs not only during pathological events but it is also a component of some physiological process.

Activation-induced death of primary T lymphocytes and other important constituents of the immune response are caspase-independent and necrotic by morphology; hence, current researchers have demonstrated that necrotic cell death can occur not only during pathological processes, but also during normal processes such as tissue renewal, embryogenesis, and immune response.

== Pathogenesis ==
=== Pathways ===
Until recently, necrosis was thought to be an unregulated process. However, there are two broad pathways in which necrosis may occur in an organism.

The first of these two pathways initially involves oncosis, where swelling of the cells occurs. Affected cells then proceed to blebbing, and this is followed by pyknosis, in which nuclear shrinkage transpires. In the final step of this pathway cell nuclei are dissolved into the cytoplasm, which is referred to as karyolysis.

The second pathway is a secondary form of necrosis that is shown to occur after apoptosis and budding. In these cellular changes of necrosis, the nucleus breaks into fragments (known as karyorrhexis).

=== Histopathological changes ===
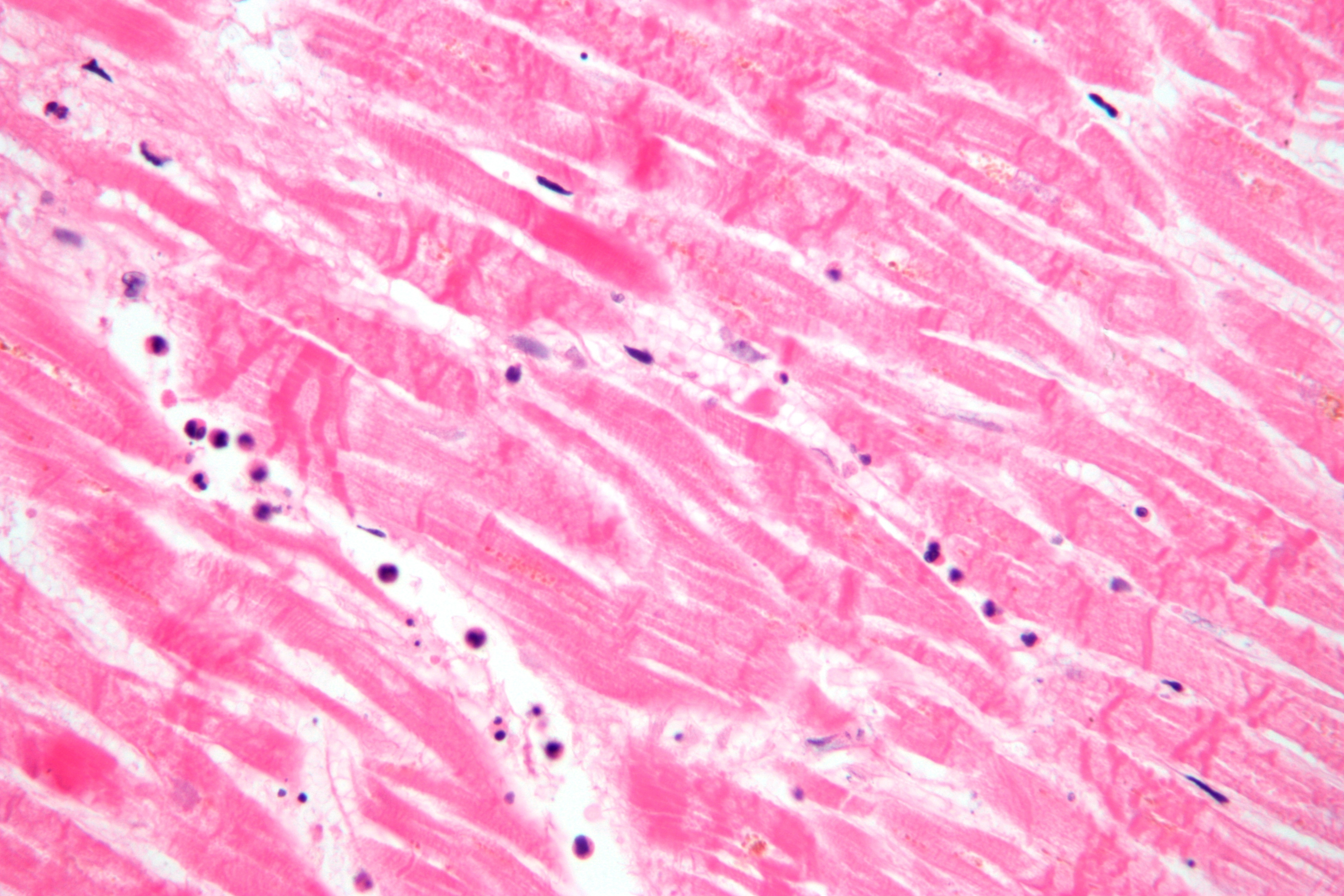
Karyolysis (and contraction band necrosis) in myocardial infarction (heart attack)

The nucleus changes in necrosis and characteristics of this change are determined by the manner in which its DNA breaks down:

- Karyolysis: the chromatin of the nucleus fades due to the loss of the DNA by degradation.
- Karyorrhexis: the shrunken nucleus fragments to complete dispersal.
- Pyknosis: the nucleus shrinks, and the chromatin condenses.

Other typical cellular changes in necrosis include:

- Cytoplasmic hypereosinophilia on samples with H&E stain. It is seen as a darker stain of the cytoplasm.
- The cell membrane appears discontinuous when viewed with an electron microscope. This discontinuous membrane is caused by cell blebbing and the loss of microvilli.

On a larger histologic scale, pseudopalisades (false palisades) are hypercellular zones that typically surround necrotic tissue. Pseudopalisading necrosis indicates an aggressive tumor.

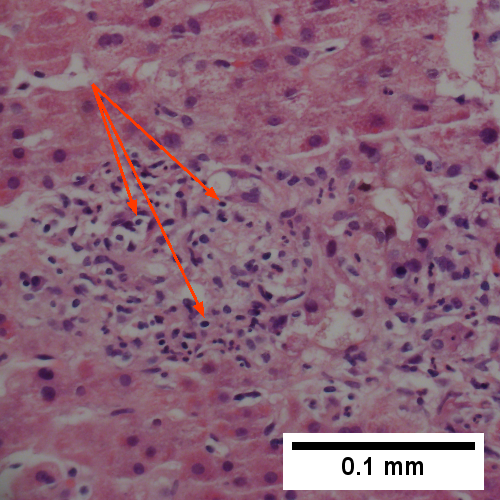
Pyknosis in a bile infarct

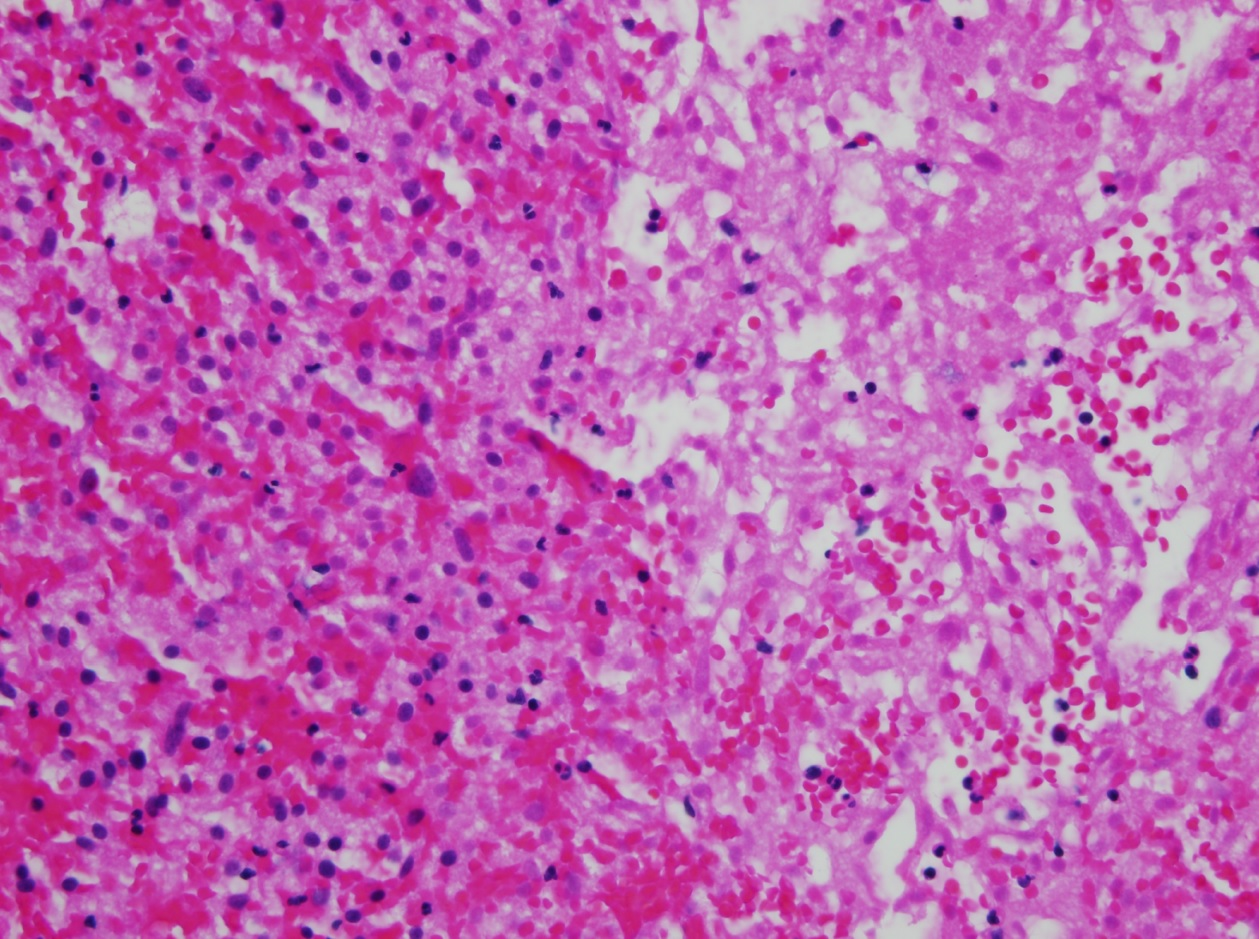
Cytoplasmic hypereosinophilia (seen in left half of image)

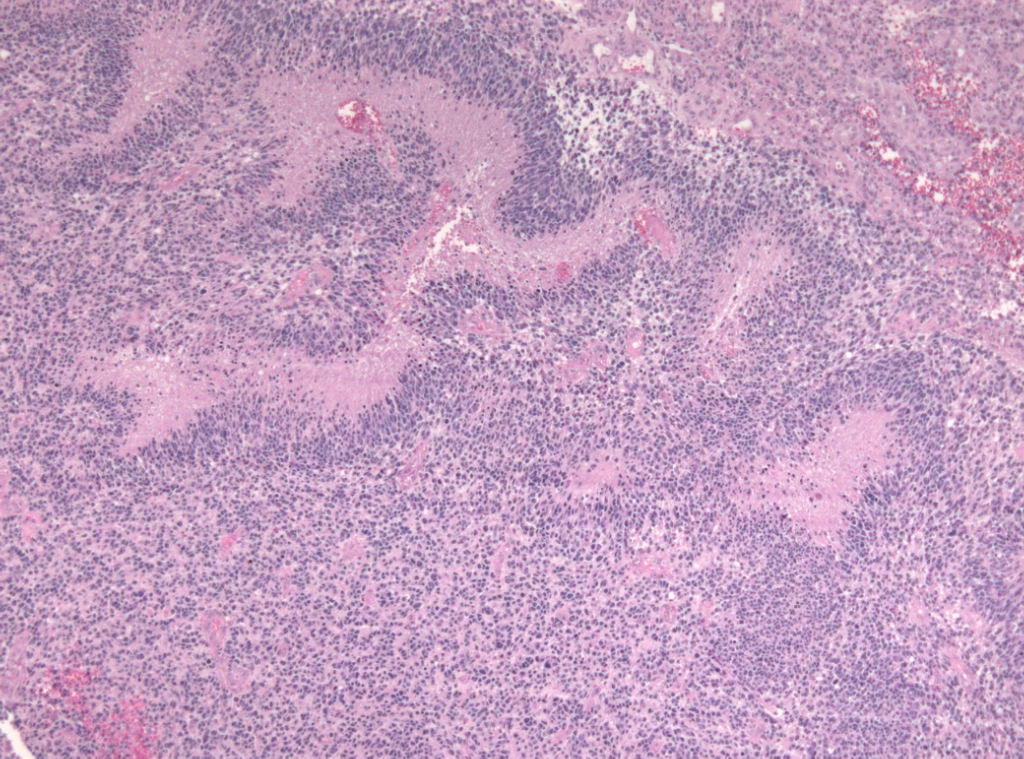
Pseudopalisading seen around necrosis in glioblastoma

== Treatment ==
There are many causes of necrosis, and as such treatment is based upon how the necrosis came about. Treatment of necrosis typically involves two distinct processes: Usually, the underlying cause of the necrosis must be treated before the dead tissue itself can be dealt with.

- Debridement, referring to the removal of dead tissue by surgical or non-surgical means, is the standard therapy for necrosis. Depending on the severity of the necrosis, this may range from removal of small patches of skin to complete amputation of affected limbs or organs. Chemical removal of necrotic tissue is another option in which enzymatic debriding agents, categorised as proteolytic, fibrinolytic or collagenases, are used to target the various components of dead tissue. In select cases, special maggot therapy using Lucilia sericata larvae has been employed to remove necrotic tissue and infection.
- In the case of ischemia, which includes myocardial infarction, the restriction of blood supply to tissues causes hypoxia and the creation of reactive oxygen species (ROS) that react with, and damage proteins and membranes. Antioxidant treatments can be applied to scavenge the ROS.
- Wounds caused by physical agents, including physical trauma and chemical burns, can be treated with antibiotics and anti-inflammatory drugs to prevent bacterial infection and inflammation. Keeping the wound clean from infection also prevents necrosis.
- Chemical and toxic agents (e.g. pharmaceutical drugs, acids, bases) react with the skin leading to skin loss and eventually necrosis. Treatment involves identification and discontinuation of the harmful agent, followed by treatment of the wound, including prevention of infection and possibly the use of immunosuppressive therapies such as anti-inflammatory drugs or immunosuppressants. In the example of a snake bite, the use of anti-venom halts the spread of toxins whilst receiving antibiotics to impede infection.

Even after the initial cause of the necrosis has been halted, the necrotic tissue will remain in the body. The body's immune response to apoptosis, which involves the automatic breaking down and recycling of cellular material, is not triggered by necrotic cell death due to the apoptotic pathway being disabled.

== In plants ==
If calcium is deficient, pectin cannot be synthesized, and therefore the cell walls cannot be bonded and thus an impediment of the meristems. This will lead to necrosis of stem and root tips and leaf edges. For example, necrosis of tissue can occur in Arabidopsis thaliana due to plant pathogens.

Cacti such as the Saguaro and Cardon in the Sonoran Desert experience necrotic patch formation regularly; a species of Dipterans called Drosophila mettleri has developed a P450 detoxification system to enable it to use the exudates released in these patches to both nest and feed larvae.

== See also ==
- Avascular necrosis
- Frostbite
- Gangrene
- Necroptosis
- Necrotizing fasciitis
- Osteonecrosis of the jaw
- Toxic epidermal necrolysis
- Necrotizing arteriolitis
