= Karyorrhexis =

Destructive fragmentation of the nucleus of a dying cell

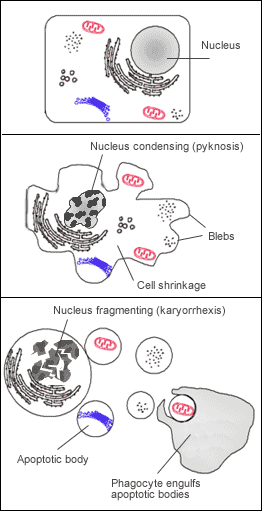
Apoptosis

Karyorrhexis (from Greek κάρυον karyon, "kernel, seed, nucleus," and ῥῆξις rhexis, "bursting") is the destructive fragmentation of the cell nucleus that occurs in a dying cell. It is characterized by the breakdown of the nuclear envelope and the dispersal of condensed chromatin into the cytoplasm. The process is usually preceded by pyknosis (irreversible chromatin condensation) and followed by karyolysis (enzymatic dissolution of chromatin). It may occur during programmed cell death (apoptosis), cellular senescence, or necrosis.

In apoptosis, karyorrhexis is mediated by Ca^{2+}- and Mg^{2+}-dependent endonucleases, ensuring that nuclear fragments are packaged into apoptotic bodies and removed by phagocytosis. In necrosis, by contrast, nuclear fragmentation occurs in a less orderly fashion, leaving behind cellular debris that can contribute to tissue damage and inflammation.

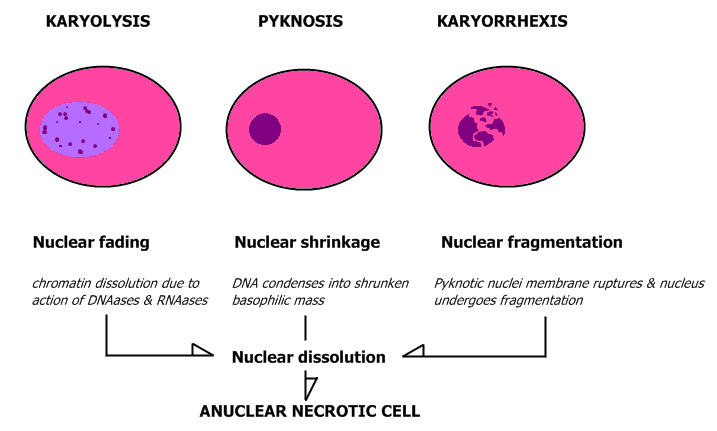
Morphological features of pyknosis and other forms of nuclear destruction

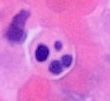
Microscopy of an apoptotic neutrophil with nuclear fragmentation (H&E stain)

== Nuclear envelope dissolution ==
In the intrinsic pathway of apoptosis, cellular stressors such as oxidative stress activate pro-apoptotic members of the Bcl-2 protein family, leading to permeabilization of the mitochondrial outer membrane. This releases cytochrome c into the cytoplasm, triggering a signaling cascade that culminates in the activation of multiple caspase enzymes. Among these, caspase-6 cleaves nuclear lamina proteins such as lamin A/C, structural components that maintain the integrity of the nuclear envelope. Their cleavage facilitates the controlled dissolution of the nuclear envelope during apoptosis.

== Chromatin fragmentation ==
During karyorrhexis in apoptosis, nuclear DNA is cleaved in an orderly fashion by endonucleases such as caspase-activated DNase, producing discrete nucleosomal fragments. This organization is possible because DNA has already undergone condensation during pyknosis, being tightly wrapped around histone proteins in repeating units of ≈180 bp. Activated endonucleases cleave the linker DNA between histones, generating short, regularly sized fragments that correspond to nucleosomal units. These DNA fragments can be visualized by gel electrophoresis, where they produce a characteristic “ladder” pattern, a hallmark used to distinguish apoptosis from other forms of cell death.

== In other forms of cell death ==
In apoptosis, karyorrhexis is a controlled process in which caspases degrade lamin proteins, leading to the orderly breakdown of the nuclear envelope. In less regulated forms of cell death, such as necrosis, nuclear degradation occurs through different mechanisms. Necrotic cells are characterized by rupture of the plasma membrane, lack of caspase activation, and the induction of an inflammatory response. Because necrosis is caspase-independent, the nucleus may remain intact during early stages before rupturing as a result of osmotic stress and membrane damage.

A specialized form of necrosis, necroptosis, involves a more regulated pathway but still results in plasma membrane rupture. Here, nuclear destabilization is mediated by the protease calpain, which cleaves lamins and promotes nuclear envelope breakdown.

Unlike karyorrhexis in apoptosis, which generates apoptotic bodies subsequently removed by phagocytosis, karyorrhexis in necroptosis leads to the uncontrolled release of intracellular contents into the extracellular space, where they are cleared primarily through pinocytosis.

== Mechanism ==
=== Apoptotic pathways ===
Apoptosis, and the associated nuclear degradation through karyorrhexis, can be triggered by a variety of physiological and pathological stimuli. DNA damage, oxidative stress, hypoxia, and infections activate signaling cascades that converge on the intrinsic apoptotic pathway. This pathway may also be induced by external factors such as ethanol, which promotes activation of apoptosis-related proteins including BAX and caspases.

In addition to intrinsic signals, activation of cell-surface death receptors such as CD95 can initiate the extrinsic apoptotic pathway, also resulting in caspase activation and nuclear envelope degradation. In both pathways, executioner caspases, particularly caspase-3, cleave nuclear lamins and promote chromatin fragmentation, driving karyorrhexis.

=== Necrotic pathways ===
In contrast to apoptosis, nuclear degradation during necrosis is a largely unregulated process. Necrotic cells are characterized by rupture of the plasma membrane, uncontrolled calcium influx, and activation of proteases such as calpain, which accelerate nuclear disintegration. These features highlight the mechanistic differences between necrotic and apoptotic karyorrhexis.

=== Senescence and DNA damage response ===
The extent of DNA damage can also determine whether a cell undergoes apoptosis or enters cellular senescence. Senescence involves a permanent cessation of cell division and is typically observed after approximately 50 doublings in primary cells.

One major cause of senescence is telomere shortening, which triggers a persistent DNA damage response (DDR). This response activates the kinases ATR and ATM, which in turn activate Chk1 and Chk2. These signaling events stabilize the transcription factor p53. When DNA damage is mild, p53 induces CIP proteins that inhibit CDKs, enforcing cell-cycle arrest. In cases of severe DNA damage, however, p53 activates apoptotic pathways, leading to caspase activity and nuclear envelope dissolution via karyorrhexis.

== Clinical significance ==
Karyorrhexis is a hallmark of cell death observed in a range of pathological conditions, including ischemia and neurodegenerative disorders. It has been documented in myocardial infarction and stroke, where nuclear fragmentation contributes to tissue damage during acute stress responses. In obstetric pathology, placental vascular malperfusion has been linked to karyorrhexis and implicated in cases of fetal demise, reflecting its role in disrupted tissue homeostasis.

In oncology, apoptotic karyorrhexis has a dual significance. On one hand, it contributes to controlled cell death and tumor suppression; on the other, resistance to apoptosis allows cancer cells to evade this process, promoting malignancy. Therapeutic strategies that target apoptotic pathways aim to restore nuclear degradation and trigger tumor regression.

== See also ==
- Karyolysis
