= Juan Rosai =

Italian-American pathologist (1940–2020)

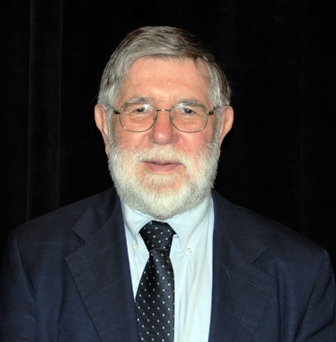
- Born: Giovanni Rosai; August 20, 1940; Poppi, Italy
- Died: July 7, 2020 (aged 79); Milan, Italy
- Education: University of Buenos Aires, Argentina & Washington University in St. Louis, Missouri
- Known for: Research in Surgical pathology
- Scientific career
- Fields: Medicine & Pathology

Juan Rosai (August 20, 1940 – July 7, 2020) was an Italian-Argentine physician who contributed to clinical research and education in the specialty of surgical pathology. He was the principal author and editor of a major textbook in that field, and he characterized novel medical conditions such as Rosai-Dorfman disease and the desmoplastic small round cell tumor. Rosai is also well-known because of his role as teacher, mentor and consultant to many American and international surgical pathologists.

== Early life and education ==
Juan Rosai was born in Poppi, a little town near Florence, province of Arezzo, in the region of Tuscany, Italy. When he was eight years old, his parents emigrated to Buenos Aires, Argentina because of the economic problems in Italy after World War II. His original first name was Giovanni Rosai, but after his family settled in Argentina his first name was changed to the equivalent Spanish name Juan. At the age of 15, Rosai enrolled in the Faculty of Medicine at the University of Buenos Aires. During his third year of medical school, he met Eduardo Lascano, a pathologist who influenced young Rosai's interest in that discipline following the teachings of Pío del Río Hortega, Lascano mentor. Rosai earned the M.D. degree at the age of 21, and then he did the residency training in Anatomic Pathology at the same university, under the direction of Lascano. While serving subsequently as a house officer in pathology at the Regional Hospital of Mar del Plata, Rosai was introduced to Lauren Ackerman at a medical conference in Argentina. Ackerman invited Rosai to train with him in St. Louis, Missouri in the United States.

== Career in the United States ==
Rosai completed his residency and fellowship in anatomic pathology at Washington University School of Medicine and Barnes Hospital under Lauren Ackerman's mentoring. Subsequently, he remained on the faculty of Washington University until 1974 when, at the age of 34, Rosai was appointed Professor & Director of Anatomic Pathology at the University of Minnesota. He left there in 1985 for an identical position at Yale University School of Medicine in New Haven, Connecticut, where he stayed until 1991. From 1991 to 1999, Rosai was the James Ewing Alumni Professor and Chairman of Pathology at Memorial Sloan-Kettering Cancer Center in New York City.

== Work in Italy and the United States ==
Juan Rosai maintained ties to Italy, his home country, throughout his life. In 1982–1983 he spent a sabbatical year at the University of Florence and the University of Bologna. In 2000 Rosai moved permanently back to Italy as Chairman of the Department of Anatomic Pathology at the Istituto Nazionale dei Tumori (National Cancer Institute) in Milan, Italy. Later, in 2005, he created the Center for Oncologic Pathology Consultations, located at the Centro Diagnostico Italiano in Milan, where he continued his consultation and educational activities focusing on oncological surgical pathology.

During his work in Italy, Rosai maintained academic connections to the United States as adjunct professor of pathology at the Weill Cornell Medical College of Cornell University, visiting professor of pathology at Harvard University and Massachusetts General Hospital, and senior consulting pathologist at Genzyme Genetics (LabCorp). He also was a consultant pathologist for the Department of Pathology of the University of Utah and ARUP Laboratories, providing surgical pathology consultation through telepathology while still working in Milan.

== Illness and death ==
Rosai developed Parkinson's disease in his late 60s. It was well-controlled for many years, but he died from complications of the condition in July 2020 at the age of 79.

== Scientific publications ==
Rosai was an author of more than 400 scientific peer-reviewed papers on topics in pathology, including the seminal descriptions of entities such as sinus histiocytosis with massive lymphadenopathy (Rosai-Dorfman disease), desmoplastic small round cell tumor, spindle-cell epithelial tumor with thymus-like differentiation of the thyroid, and sclerosing angiomatoid nodular transformation of the spleen. He was Editor-in-Chief of the International Journal of Surgical Pathology until 2014 and served as a member of the editorial boards of several other pathology journals. Rosai was also Editor-in-Chief of the 3rd Series of the Atlas of Tumor Pathology of the Armed Forces Institute of Pathology (AFIP), and author of AFIP fascicles on Tumors of the Thymus and Tumors of the Thyroid Gland, and a book on the history of American surgical pathology called Guiding the Surgeon's Hand. He has also edited or co-edited 13 other books.

Perhaps the most famous publication by Juan Rosai is his textbook called Rosai and Ackerman's Surgical Pathology. This classic surgical pathology textbook was first published in 1953 by Rosai's mentor, Lauren Ackerman, as a pathology book focused on the differential diagnosis and morphological features with clinical significance. Over the years, the new editions of Ackerman's book were continued by Rosai until its tenth edition was published in 2011. Rosai's textbook is well known among pathologists due to its clear and didactic style, including illustrations as examples of key diagnostic features. Rosai's pathology textbook has been influential in the education in surgical pathology across the world, and it has been translated to several languages, including Spanish, Chinese, Italian, and Croatian, besides its original edition in the English language. Rosai and Ackerman's Surgical Pathology textbook is currently continued in its 11th edition (2018) by a team of experts in the field of pathology.

== The Juan Rosai Collection of Surgical Pathology Seminars ==
During his career, Juan Rosai accumulated a comprehensive collection of slide seminars including histopathology slides of interesting and educational pathological cases with the comments by connoted pathologists. In 2010 Rosai donated his entire seminars collection as an open and free educational resource. Thanks to a collaborative effort between Rosai, the United States and Canadian Academy of Pathology (USCAP) and Aperio ePathology the slide seminars are available as digital pathology files which can be freely accessed by pathologists across the world. The collection consists of 18,439 cases originally presented at 1,495 pathology seminars, and comprises digital images of the original histopathological slides, clinical history, and diagnostic summaries, along with commentaries by Rosai and other experts.

== Professional awards and honors ==
In appreciation of his contributions to pathology, Rosai has received formal recognition from academic institutions around the world, as follows:

- Life Trustee of the American Board of Pathology;
- Doctorate Honoris Causa at the University of Bologna, Italy (1988);
- Maude Abbott Lecturer at the United States and Canadian Academy of Pathology, Toronto, Canada (1995);
- Doctorate Honoris Causa at the University of Santiago de Compostela, Spain (1999);
- Doctorate Honoris Causa at the National University of Córdoba, Argentina (2000);
- Honorary Membership in the Royal College of Pathologists, England (2001);
- Fred Waldorf Stewart Award of the Memorial Sloan–Kettering Cancer Center, New York (2006);
- Doctorate Honoris Causa at the University of Ioannina, Greece (2007);
- Mastership from the American Society for Clinical Pathology, 2007
- Distinguished Pathologist Award of the Council of the United States and Canadian Academy of Pathology, Washington, D.C. (2010)
- The Golden Medal Award of the International Academy of Pathology (2011)

== Other Pertinent Topics ==
- Surgical pathology
- Digital pathology
- List of pathologists
