= Jonathan I. Epstein =

Jonathan I. Epstein is an American pathologist and physician-scientist who is the Reinhard Professor of Urologic Pathology at Johns Hopkins School of Medicine. He was director of surgical pathology at Johns Hopkins Hospital.

== Life ==
Epstein earned a B.A. and M.D. (1981) from Boston University. He completed a residency in anatomic pathology at Johns Hopkins Hospital and a fellowship in oncological pathology at the Memorial Sloan Kettering Cancer Center.

Epstein joined the faculty at the Johns Hopkins School of Medicine in 1985. He is the Reinhard Professor of Urologic Pathology. He was president of the International Society of Urologic Pathology. He is the director of surgical pathology at Johns Hopkins Hospital. In May 2023, Epstein was placed on administrative leave.

In 2014, Epstein married pathologist Hillary Epstein in Big Sur.

In February, 2024, he resigned his position at Johns Hopkins after allegations of professional misconduct.

According to Google Scholar in 2024, his publications have been cited 134,857, he has an h-index of 175 and i-10 index of 1,020.
