= Michael Wells (pathologist) =

British pathologist

- Born: 7 August 1952 (age 74)
- Education: University of Manchester
- Known for: Gynecologic pathology
- Scientific career
- Fields: Medicine, Pathologist
- Workplaces: University of Sheffield School of Medicine and Biomedical Sciences

Michael Wells is a British pathologist who was the president of the European Society of Pathology from 2009 to 2011.

== Early life and education ==
Michael Wells graduated in 1976 from the University of Manchester with a BSc and MB, ChB in medicine and surgery.

== Career ==
After graduation, Wells moved to Bristol and then to the University of Leeds where he was a Lecturer in the then Department of Pathology. In 1997, he was appointed Professor of Gynaecological Pathology at the University of Sheffield. During his career, he served as the president of the International Society of Gynaecological Pathologists and as the president of British Gynaecological Cancer Society. He was the president of the European Society of Pathology from 2009 to 2011.

== Editorships ==
- Editor of Haines and Taylor Obstetrical & Gynaecological Pathology
- Editor of the journal Histopathology

== Personal ==
Wells is married to Lynne, a nurse specialist in palliative care and has a son, a daughter and two stepsons.
