= History of pathology =

History of the scientific study of disease

The history of pathology can be traced to the earliest application of the scientific method to the field of medicine, a development which occurred in the Middle East during the Islamic Golden Age and in Western Europe during the Italian Renaissance.

Early systematic human dissections were carried out by the Ancient Greek physicians Herophilus of Chalcedon and Erasistratus of Chios in the early part of the third century BC. The first physician known to have made postmortem dissections was the Arabian physician Avenzoar (1091–1161). Rudolf Virchow (1821–1902) is generally recognized to be the father of microscopic pathology. Most early pathologists were also practicing physicians or surgeons.

== Origins of pathology ==
Early understanding of the origins of diseases constitutes the earliest application of the scientific method to the field of medicine, a development which occurred in the Middle East during the Islamic Golden Age and in Western Europe during the Italian Renaissance.

The Greek physician Hippocrates, the founder of scientific medicine, was the first to deal with the anatomy and the pathology of human spine. Galen developed an interest in anatomy from his studies of Herophilus and Erasistratus. The concept of studying disease through the methodical dissection and examination of diseased bodies, organs, and tissues may seem obvious today, but there are few if any recorded examples of true autopsies performed prior to the second millennium. Though the pathology of contagion was understood by Muslim physicians since the time of Avicenna (980–1037) who described it in The Canon of Medicine (c. 1020), the first physician known to have made postmortem dissections was the Arabian physician Avenzoar (1091–1161) who proved that the skin disease scabies was caused by a parasite, followed by Ibn al-Nafis (b. 1213) who used dissection to discover pulmonary circulation in 1242. In the 15th century, anatomic dissection was repeatedly used by the Italian physician Antonio Benivieni (1443–1502) to determine cause of death. Antonio Benivieni is also credited with having introduced necropsy to the medical field. Perhaps the most famous early gross pathologist was Giovanni Morgagni (1682–1771). His magnum opus, De Sedibus et Causis Morborum per Anatomem Indagatis, published in 1761, describes the findings of over 600 partial and complete autopsies, organised anatomically and methodically correlated with the symptoms exhibited by the patients prior to their demise. Although the study of normal anatomy was already well advanced at this date, De Sedibus was one of the first treatises specifically devoted to the correlation of diseased anatomy with clinical illness. By the late 1800s, an exhaustive body of literature had been produced on the gross anatomical findings characteristic of known diseases. The extent of gross pathology research in this period can be epitomized by the work of the Viennese pathologist (originally from Hradec Kralove in the Czech Rep.) Carl Rokitansky (1804–1878), who is said to have performed 20,000 autopsies, and supervised an additional 60,000, in his lifetime.

== Origins of microscopic pathology ==
Rudolf Virchow (1821–1902) is generally recognized to be the father of microscopic pathology. While the compound microscope had been invented approximately 150 years prior, Virchow was one of the first prominent physicians to emphasize the study of manifestations of disease which were visible only at the cellular level. A student of Virchow's, Julius Cohnheim (1839–1884) combined histology techniques with experimental manipulations to study inflammation, making him one of the earliest experimental pathologists. Cohnheim also pioneered the use of the frozen section procedure; a version of this technique is widely employed by modern pathologists to render diagnoses and provide other clinical information intraoperatively.

== Modern experimental pathology ==
As new research techniques, such as electron microscopy, immunohistochemistry, and molecular biology have expanded the means by which biomedical scientists can study disease, the definition and boundaries of investigative pathology have become less distinct. In the broadest sense, nearly all research which links manifestations of disease to identifiable processes in cells, tissues, or organs can be considered experimental pathology.

== Other pertinent topics ==
- History of medicine
- Anatomical pathology
- Surgical pathology
- List of pathologists
- United States and Canadian Academy of Pathology
