= Gastrointestinal pathology =

Gastrointestinal pathology is the subspecialty of surgical pathology which deals with the diagnosis and characterization of neoplastic and non-neoplastic diseases of the digestive tract and accessory organs, such as the pancreas and liver. The gastrointestinal tract is part of the digestive system or alimentary tract, and follows the passage of food and liquids as they pass through the body. The organs included in the gastrointestinal tract include the mouth, the throat (pharynx), esophagus, stomach, small intestine, large intestine, rectum and anus, in that order.

== Sub-specialty recognition and Board Certification ==
Gastrointestinal pathology (including liver, gallbladder and pancreas) is a recognized sub-specialty discipline of surgical pathology. Recognition of a sub-specialty is generally related to dedicated fellowship training offered within the subspecialty or, alternatively, to surgical pathologists with a special interest and extensive experience in gastrointestinal pathology. There are approximately 30 gastrointestinal pathology fellowships offered within the United States (predominantly academic, and more recently three "corporate" fellowships). This translates to fewer than 40 fellowship trained gastrointestinal pathologists being trained annually in the United States each year.

Fellowship in gastrointestinal pathology involves:

- diagnostic evaluation of surgical (whole organ) and biopsy pathology of gastrointestinal tissue, [with the exception of at least one corporate fellowship]
- consistent interaction with clinical colleagues (gastroenterologists, colorectal surgeons and gastrointestinal radiologists) to ensure understanding of the clinical aspects of gastrointestinal disease, treatment modalities and other diagnostic findings;
- research in gastrointestinal physiology, disease mechanisms and histomorphology
- education of general pathologists and clinical colleagues.

During the course of a one-year gastrointestinal pathology fellowship, the GI-liver pathology fellow will review between 8,000 and 15,000 gastrointestinal and liver biopsy and surgical specimens with all clinical history, laboratory data and frequently, knowledge of response to treatment. This volume of cases is similar to approximately five years of case experience for general surgical pathologists in private practice.

Board certification in the United States requires approval by the certifying body, the American Board of Pathology. There has been considerable debate among academic and private practice gastrointestinal pathologists regarding the necessity, advantages and disadvantages of Board Certification in this subspecialty. The debate was last formally approached in 2001, during Dr. Joel K. Greenson's tenure as President of the Rodger C. Haggitt Gastrointestinal Pathology Society. The decision to seek Board Certification was declined by the membership of the Society.

=== History of the Rodger C. Haggitt Gastrointestinal Pathology Society ===
At the 1976 annual meeting of the organization then called the International Academy of Pathology (IAP), now the United States and Canadian Academy of Pathology (USCAP), the long course was devoted to gastrointestinal pathology. Due to its success, the first evening subspecialty conference devoted to gastrointestinal pathology was presented the following year at the IAP annual meeting in March 1977. That first evening session was organized by Jack Yardley from Johns Hopkins University, and included Henry Appelman (University of Michigan), Harvey Goldman (Beth Israel Hospital and Harvard Medical School), Bill Hawk (The Cleveland Clinic), Tom Kent (University of Iowa), Si-Chun Ming (Temple University), Tom Norris (University of Washington), and Robert Riddell (University of Chicago). This group, headed by Henry Appelman, organized a group for gastrointestinal pathologists.

Every gastrointestinal pathologist in the United States and Canada received an invitation to attend the first organizational meeting, held during the 1979 IAP meeting. At that meeting, the establishment of a society was approved, and four subcommittees were formed to deal with membership, finances, bylaws, and educational activities. During the next year, all organizational functions were completed, and at the 1980 IAP meeting, the organization was officially established, by-laws were approved, the first officers elected, the first dues collected, and the first educational program was offered. The original name for the organization was the Gastrointestinal Pathology Club. Only later did it achieve "Society" status. In 2001, after the tragic and untimely homicidal death of Dr. Rodger C. Haggitt, the name of the society was officially changed to Rodger C. Haggitt Gastrointestinal Pathology Society.

The organization was developed as a mechanism:

- for propagating interest in gastrointestinal pathology
- for emphasizing the importance of gastrointestinal pathology as a sophisticated and complex area of pathology
- for sharing information among members
- for developing joint investigative efforts among members
- for establishing referral centers or referral mechanisms for specific types of case problems
- for devising a registry for unusual cases.

The first three of these initial goals were accomplished early on. The club was recognized as a companion society of the IAP and its first scientific session was presented about a year later. The fourth goal took longer, but it, too, has been fulfilled as exemplified by a published study on adenomas with invasive carcinoma that was shepherded by Harry Cooper. It took e-mail technology to really allow the fifth goal, the referral network, to operate. The development of an e-mail group from the Society, which became an opportunity for members to consult a wide group of GI colleagues regarding problem cases, has been functional since 1995. The sixth goal, the registry issue, has yet to get off the ground. Currently, the Society awards prizes for resident presentations at the USCAP annual meeting and organizes educational symposia at national meetings, including the IAP, the American Society of Clinical Pathologists, Digestive Disease Week and the international congresses of the International Academy of Pathology.

=== Current Impact of Gastrointestinal Pathology as a Sub-Specialty ===
Digestive diseases affect 1 in 5 Americans annually – at least 60 million people in the United States each year. Digestive diseases account for approximately 50 million physician visits, nearly 25 million endoscopic diagnostic procedures and over 20 million gastrointestinal specimens directed to pathologists – representing $87 billion in direct medical costs attributable to gastrointestinal disease. The demand for gastroenterology care and diagnostic procedures continue to increase, driven by an increasing incidence of gastrointestinal disease and the need for colorectal cancer screening in the aging U.S. population. By 2010, gastroenterologists will perform at least 40 million endoscopic procedures annually, translating into $40 billion endoscopy and $12 billion related gastrointestinal pathology expenses annually in the U.S.

With less than 400 fellowship-trained gastrointestinal pathologists in practice in the United States, approximately 8% of the 20+ million gastrointestinal biopsies currently performed each year are reviewed by pathologists with fellowship training in digestive health and disease. The remaining 90 to 92% of biopsies are reviewed by highly skilled general surgical pathologists including some who have special interest in gastrointestinal pathology.

General surgical pathologists who practice with a focus in gastrointestinal pathology may attend continuing medical education courses offered by fellowship-trained academic and private practice gastrointestinal pathologists, may attend intensive "mini-fellowships" that are offered by select institutions (i.e. AFIP) to further hone their diagnostic skills and develop close working relationships with gastroenterologists to ensure a broad knowledge base with regards to clinical correlation of the findings under the microscope.

Whether a fellowship trained gastrointestinal pathologist, a general surgical pathologist with subspecialty interest in GI or an adept general surgical pathologist is reviewing a particular biopsy or surgical specimen, it is important to keep in mind that the training for the specialty of surgical pathology is rigorous. Following completion of both college and medical school, the surgical pathologist must have also completed an accredited residency in pathology and is board certified in Anatomic Pathology by the American Board of Pathology. Residency in pathology is one of the longest postgraduate training programs, encompassing 4–5 years. (In comparison, internal medicine and pediatrics are only 3 years.)

In most instances, gastrointestinal biopsies and surgical specimens represent common diseases that display common histomorphologic patterns, and are accurately evaluated and classified by adept general pathologists. Similar to many aspects of medicine, not all gastrointestinal tissue specimens require sub-specialist review for the accurate diagnosis to be rendered. Internal medicine physicians treat many gastrointestinal conditions without referral to a gastroenterologist specialist. Similarly, many gastrointestinal tissue biopsies and surgical specimens are accurately diagnosed without referral to a gastrointestinal pathologist. Certain diseases are histologically subtle or the differential diagnosis is complicated or complex. In such cases a close working relationship between the pathologist and gastroenterologist with correlation of clinical, endoscopic, and biopsy findings may be of great benefit to the submitting physician and to the patient.

Appropriate biopsy classification of GI biopsies is critical. Current literature and other non-published reviews estimate that at least 10% of the diagnoses of Barrett's esophagus, a precancerous condition, are rendered in error. At least 15 – 20% of stomach biopsies have misclassified disease characteristics, 15% of colon polyps are misdiagnosed, and up to 50% of all cases of chronic inflammatory bowel disease are misdiagnosed or misclassified.

Though pathology diagnosis is a critical determinant of future cancer risk and screening interval, many of these diagnoses do not result in significant morbidity or mortality for patients; thus, errors may be "masked" by the limited effect to the patient in the present context.

The economic cost of inaccurate pathology diagnoses can be measured from the perspective of the healthcare system, the gastroenterologist practice and the patient. Within the healthcare system, gastroenterology pathology diagnostic inaccuracy of 10% is equivalent to 2 million misdiagnoses each year. The vast majority of these patients will incur additional medical expenses from repeat clinician office visits; repeat diagnostic procedures, unnecessary enrollment in surveillance programs, and treatment with incorrect or completely unnecessary medications. The cost savings of the correct gastrointestinal pathology diagnosis being rendered at first opportunity by expert board certified surgical pathologists is conservatively estimated within the range of $200M – $1B.

Born out of increasing awareness of subspecialty gastrointestinal pathology services, increased marketing efforts by gastrointestinal pathology companies and increased patient awareness of laboratory errors, there is an increasing trend toward referral of tissue specimens to surgical pathologists with special interest in gastrointestinal pathology.
