= Diagnosis of myocardial infarction =

Type of diagnosis

Myocardial infarction diagnosis
- Purpose: Diagnose myocardial infarct via physical exam and EKG (plus blood test)

A diagnosis of myocardial infarction is created by integrating the history of the presenting illness and physical examination with electrocardiogram findings and cardiac markers (blood tests for heart muscle cell damage). A coronary angiogram allows visualization of narrowings or obstructions on the heart vessels, and therapeutic measures can follow immediately. At autopsy, a pathologist can diagnose a myocardial infarction based on anatomopathological findings.

A chest radiograph and routine blood tests may indicate complications or precipitating causes and are often performed upon arrival to an emergency department. New regional wall motion abnormalities on an echocardiogram are also suggestive of a myocardial infarction. Echo may be performed in equivocal cases by the on-call cardiologist. In stable patients whose symptoms have resolved by the time of evaluation, Technetium (99mTc) sestamibi (i.e. a "MIBI scan"), thallium-201 chloride or Rubidium-82 Chloride can be used in nuclear medicine to visualize areas of reduced blood flow in conjunction with physiologic or pharmacologic stress. Thallium may also be used to determine viability of tissue, distinguishing whether non-functional myocardium is actually dead or merely in a state of hibernation or of being stunned.

== Diagnostic criteria ==
According to the WHO criteria as revised in 2000, a cardiac troponin rise accompanied by either typical symptoms, pathological Q waves, ST elevation or depression or coronary intervention are diagnostic of MI.

Previous WHO criteria formulated in 1979 put less emphasis on cardiac biomarkers; according to these, a patient is diagnosed with myocardial infarction if two (probable) or three (definite) of the following criteria are satisfied:

1. Clinical history of ischaemic type chest pain lasting for more than 20 minutes
2. Changes in serial ECG tracings
3. Rise and fall of serum cardiac biomarkers such as creatine kinase-MB fraction and troponin

== Physical examination ==
The general appearance of patients may vary according to the experienced symptoms; the patient may be comfortable, or restless and in severe distress with an increased respiratory rate. A cool and pale skin is common and points to vasoconstriction. Some patients have low-grade fever (38–39 °C). Blood pressure may be elevated or decreased, and the pulse can become irregular.

If heart failure ensues, elevated jugular venous pressure and hepatojugular reflux, or swelling of the legs due to peripheral edema may be found on inspection. Rarely, a cardiac bulge with a pace different from the pulse rhythm can be felt on precordial examination. Various abnormalities can be found on auscultation, such as a third and fourth heart sound, systolic murmurs, paradoxical splitting of the second heart sound, a pericardial friction rub and rales over the lung.

== Electrocardiogram ==
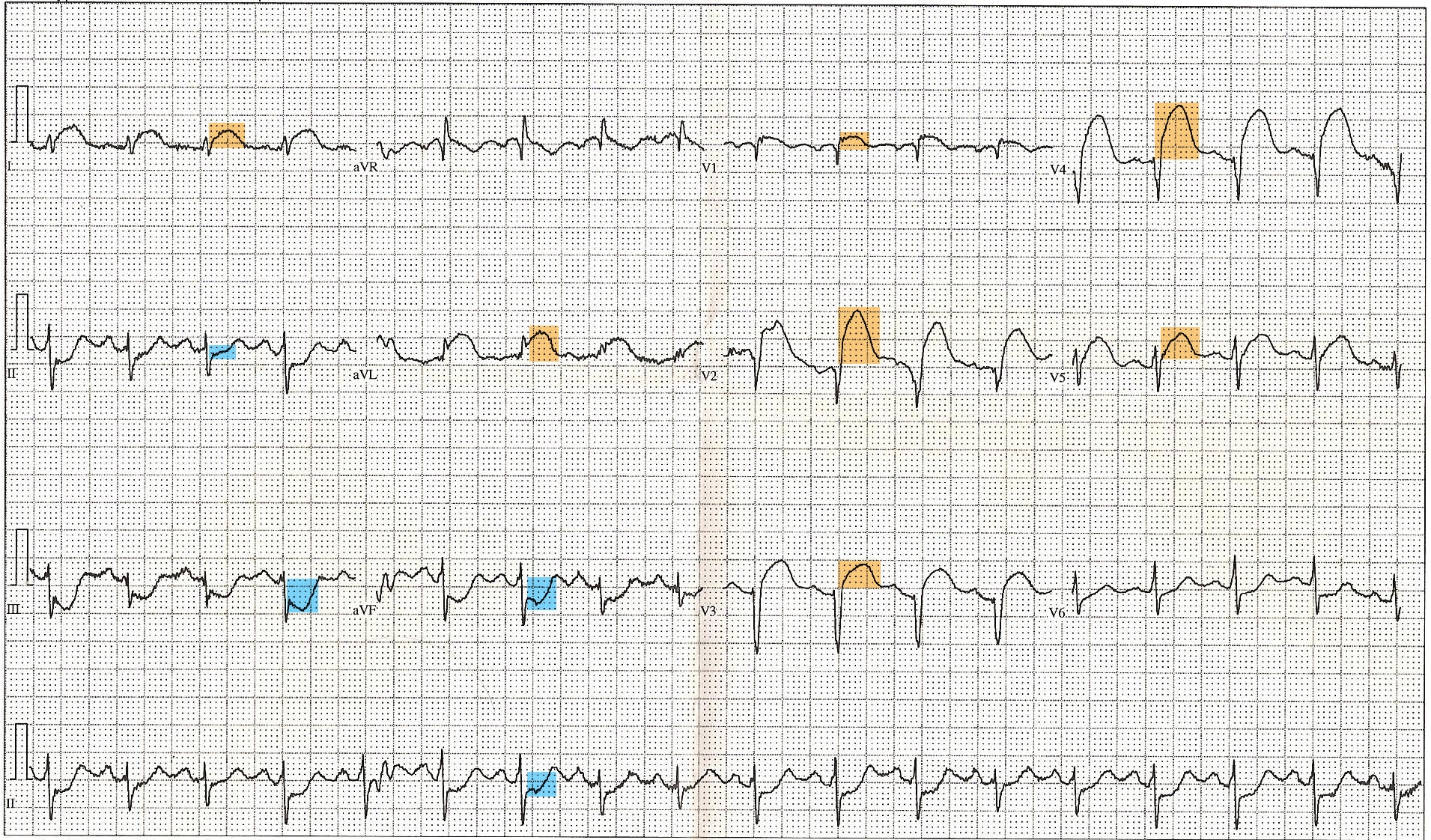
12-lead electrocardiogram showing ST-segment elevation (orange) in I, aVL and V1-V5 with reciprocal changes (blue) in the inferior leads, indicative of an anterior wall myocardial infarction.

The primary purpose of the electrocardiogram is to detect ischemia or acute coronary injury in broad, symptomatic emergency department populations. A serial ECG may be used to follow rapid changes in time. The standard 12 lead ECG does not directly examine the right ventricle, and is relatively poor at examining the posterior basal and lateral walls of the left ventricle. In particular, acute myocardial infarction in the distribution of the circumflex artery is likely to produce a nondiagnostic ECG. The use of additional ECG leads like right-sided leads V3R and V4R and posterior leads V7, V8, and V9 may improve sensitivity for right ventricular and posterior myocardial infarction.

The 12 lead ECG is used to classify patients into one of three groups:

1. those with ST segment elevation or new bundle branch block (suspicious for acute injury and a possible candidate for acute reperfusion therapy with thrombolytics or primary PCI),
2. those with ST segment depression or T wave inversion (suspicious for ischemia), and
3. those with a so-called non-diagnostic or normal ECG.

A normal ECG does not rule out acute myocardial infarction. Mistakes in interpretation are relatively common, and the failure to identify high risk features has a negative effect on the quality of patient care.

It should be determined if a person is at high risk for myocardial infarction before conducting imaging tests to make a diagnosis. People who have a normal ECG and who are able to exercise, for example, do not merit routine imaging. Imaging tests such as stress radionuclide myocardial perfusion imaging or stress echocardiography can confirm a diagnosis when a person's history, physical exam, ECG and cardiac biomarkers suggest the likelihood of a problem.

== Cardiac markers ==
Cardiac markers or cardiac enzymes are proteins that leak out of injured myocardial cells through their damaged cell membranes into the bloodstream. Until the 1980s, the enzymes SGOT and LDH were used to assess cardiac injury. Now, the markers most widely used in detection of MI are MB subtype of the enzyme creatine kinase and cardiac troponins T and I as they are more specific for myocardial injury. The cardiac troponins T and I which are released within 4–6 hours of an attack of MI and remain elevated for up to 2 weeks, have nearly complete tissue specificity and are now the preferred markers for assessing myocardial damage. Heart-type fatty acid binding protein is another marker, used in some home test kits. Elevated troponins in the setting of chest pain may accurately predict a high likelihood of a myocardial infarction in the near future. New markers such as glycogen phosphorylase isoenzyme BB are under investigation. Note that only the cardiac troponins are used clinically for myocardial infarction as creatine kinase adds little value in diagnosing MI while adding to system cost.

The diagnosis of myocardial infarction requires two out of three components (history, ECG, and enzymes). When damage to the heart occurs, levels of cardiac markers rise over time, which is why blood tests for them are taken over a 24-hour period. Because these enzyme levels are not elevated immediately following a heart attack, patients presenting with chest pain are generally treated with the assumption that a myocardial infarction has occurred and then evaluated for a more precise diagnosis.

== Angiography ==
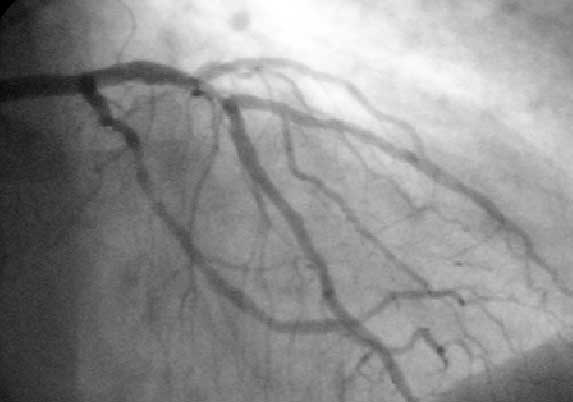
Angiogram of the coronary arteries.

In difficult cases or in situations where intervention to restore blood flow is appropriate, coronary angiography can be performed. A catheter is inserted into an artery (typically the radial or femoral artery) and pushed to the vessels supplying the heart. A radio-opaque dye is administered through the catheter and a sequence of x-rays (fluoroscopy) is performed. Obstructed or narrowed arteries can be identified, and angioplasty applied as a therapeutic measure (see below). Angioplasty requires extensive skill, especially in emergency settings. It is performed by a physician trained in interventional cardiology.

== Histopathology ==
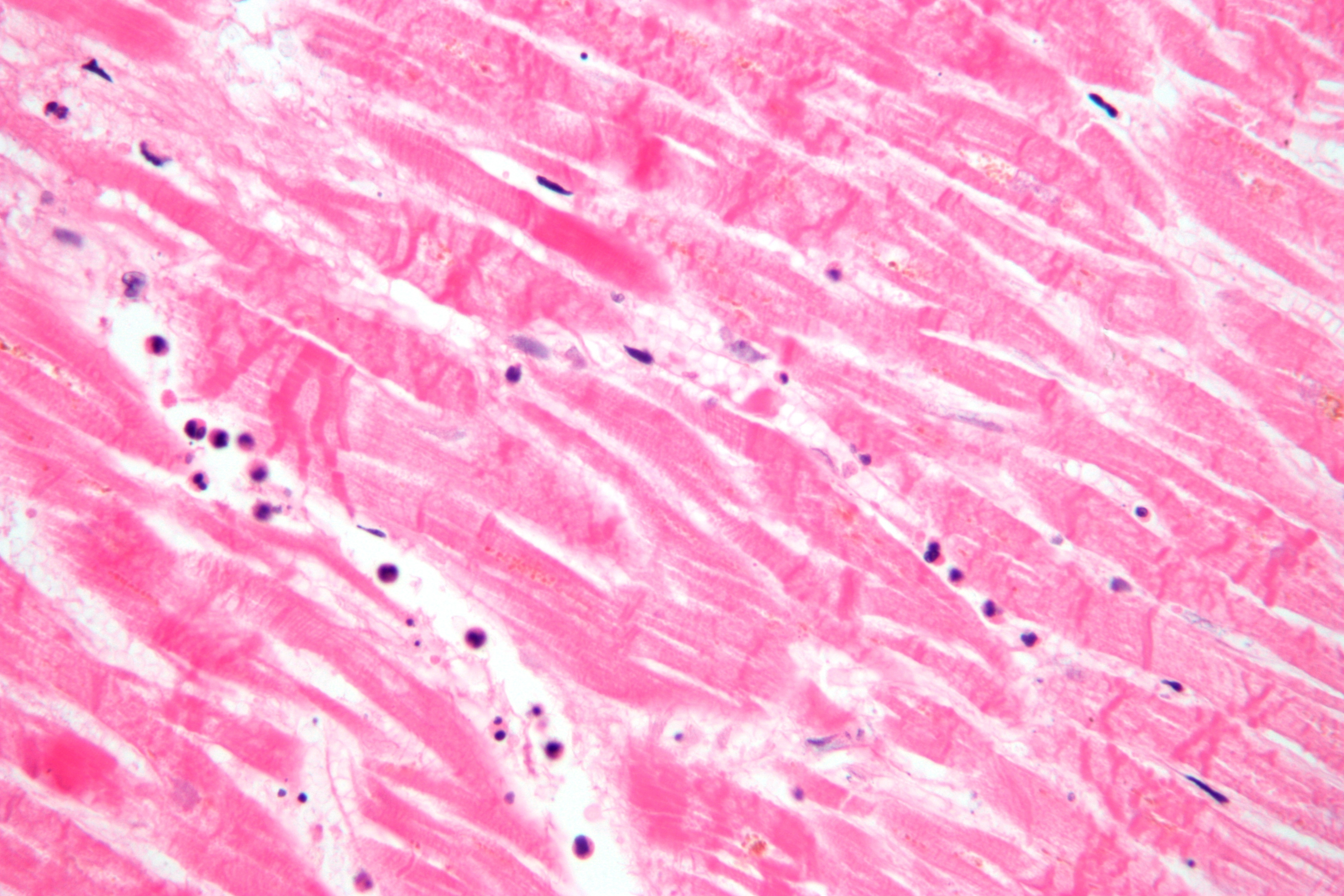
Micrograph of a myocardial infarction (ca. 400x H&E stain ) with prominent contraction band necrosis.

Histopathological examination of the heart may reveal infarction at autopsy. Gross examination may reveal signs of myocardial infarction.

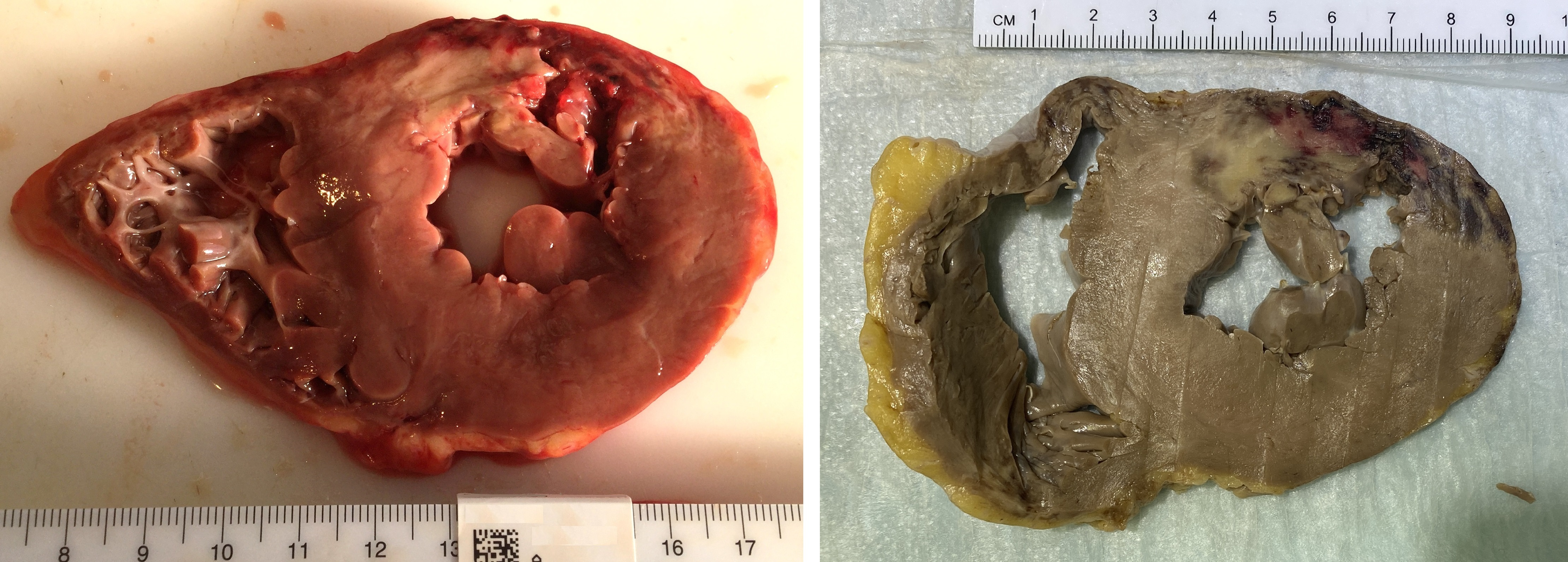
A one-week-old myocardial infarction of the posterior left ventricle, with focal rupture, in fresh state (left) and after formalin fixation (right). The infarcted area is pale whereas the rupture is hemorrhagic (dark red).

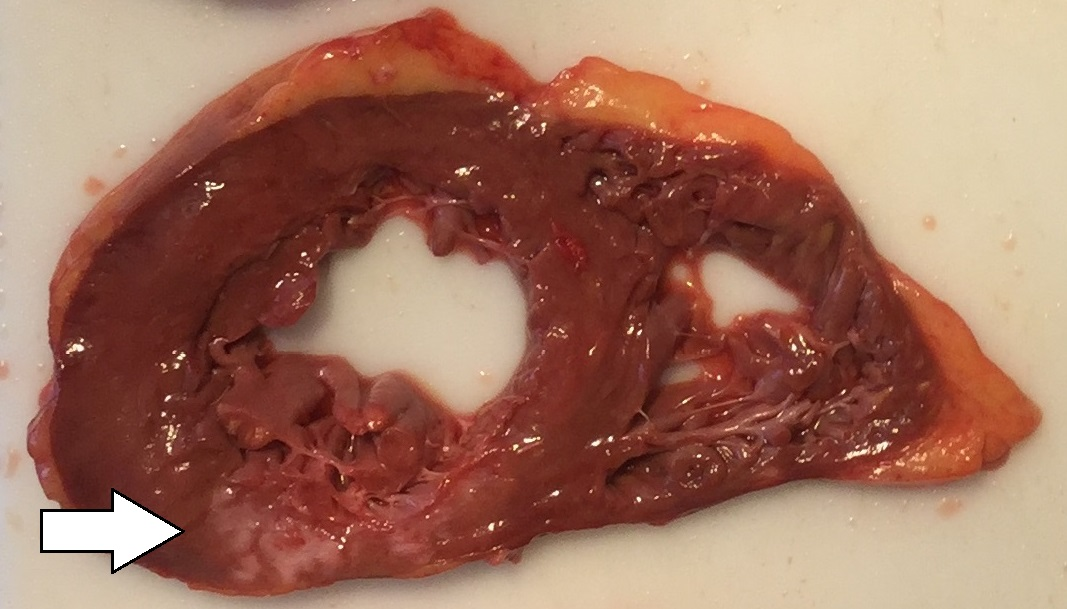
Cross-section of the heart, showing an old myocardial infarction of the posterior wall of the left ventricle (seen as pale areas).

Under the microscope, myocardial infarction presents as a circumscribed area of ischemic, coagulative necrosis (cell death). On gross examination, the infarct is not identifiable within the first 12 hours.

Although earlier changes can be discerned using electron microscopy, one of the earliest changes under a normal microscope are so-called wavy fibers. Subsequently, the myocyte cytoplasm becomes more eosinophilic (pink) and the cells lose their transversal striations, with typical changes and eventually loss of the cell nucleus. The interstitium at the margin of the infarcted area is initially infiltrated with neutrophils, then with lymphocytes and macrophages, who phagocytose ("eat") the myocyte debris. The necrotic area is surrounded and progressively invaded by granulation tissue, which will replace the infarct with a fibrous (collagenous) scar (which are typical steps in wound healing). The interstitial space (the space between cells outside of blood vessels) may be infiltrated with red blood cells.

These features can be recognized in cases where the perfusion was not restored; reperfused infarcts can have other hallmarks, such as contraction band necrosis.

These tables gives an overview of the histopathology seen in myocardial infarction by time after obstruction.

=== By individual parameters ===
| Myocardial histologic parameters (HE staining) | Earliest manifestation | Full development | Decrease/disappearance | Image |
|---|---|---|---|---|
| Stretched/wavy fibres | 1–2 h | | | |
| Coagulative necrosis: cytoplasmic hypereosinophilia | 1–3 h | 1–3 days; cytoplasmic hypereosinophilia and loss of striations | > 3 days: disintegration | |
| Interstitial edema | 4–12 h | | | |
| Coagulative necrosis: 'nuclear changes' | 12–24 (pyknosis, karyorrhexis) | 1–3 days (loss of nuclei) | Depends on size of infarction | |
| Neutrophil infiltration | 12–24 h | 1–3 days | 5–7 days | |
| Karyorrhexis of neutrophils | 1.5–2 days | 3–5 days | | |
| Macrophages and lymphocytes | 3–5 days | 5–10 days (including 'siderophages') | 10 days to 2 months | |
| Vessel/endothelial sprouts* | 5–10 days | 10 days–4 weeks | 4 weeks: disappearance of capillaries; some large dilated vessels persist | |
| Fibroblast and young collagen* | 5–10 days | 2–4 weeks | After 4 weeks; depends on size of infarction; | |
| Dense fibrosis | 4 weeks | 2–3 months | No | |

- Some authors summarize the vascular and early fibrotic changes as 'granulation tissue', which is maximal at 2–3 weeks

Differential diagnoses for myocardial fibrosis:

- Interstitial fibrosis, which is nonspecific, having been described in congestive heart failure, hypertension, and normal aging.
- Subepicardial fibrosis, which is associated with non-infarction diagnoses such as myocarditis and non-ischemic cardiomyopathy.
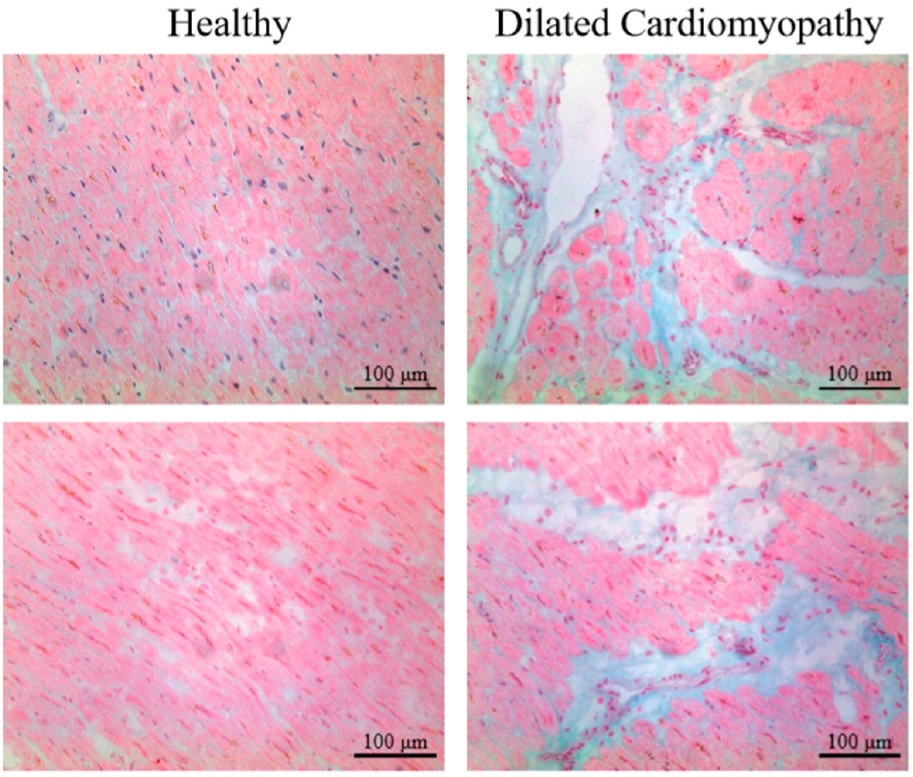
Healthy myocardium versus interstitial fibrosis in dilated cardiomyopathy. Alcian blue stain.

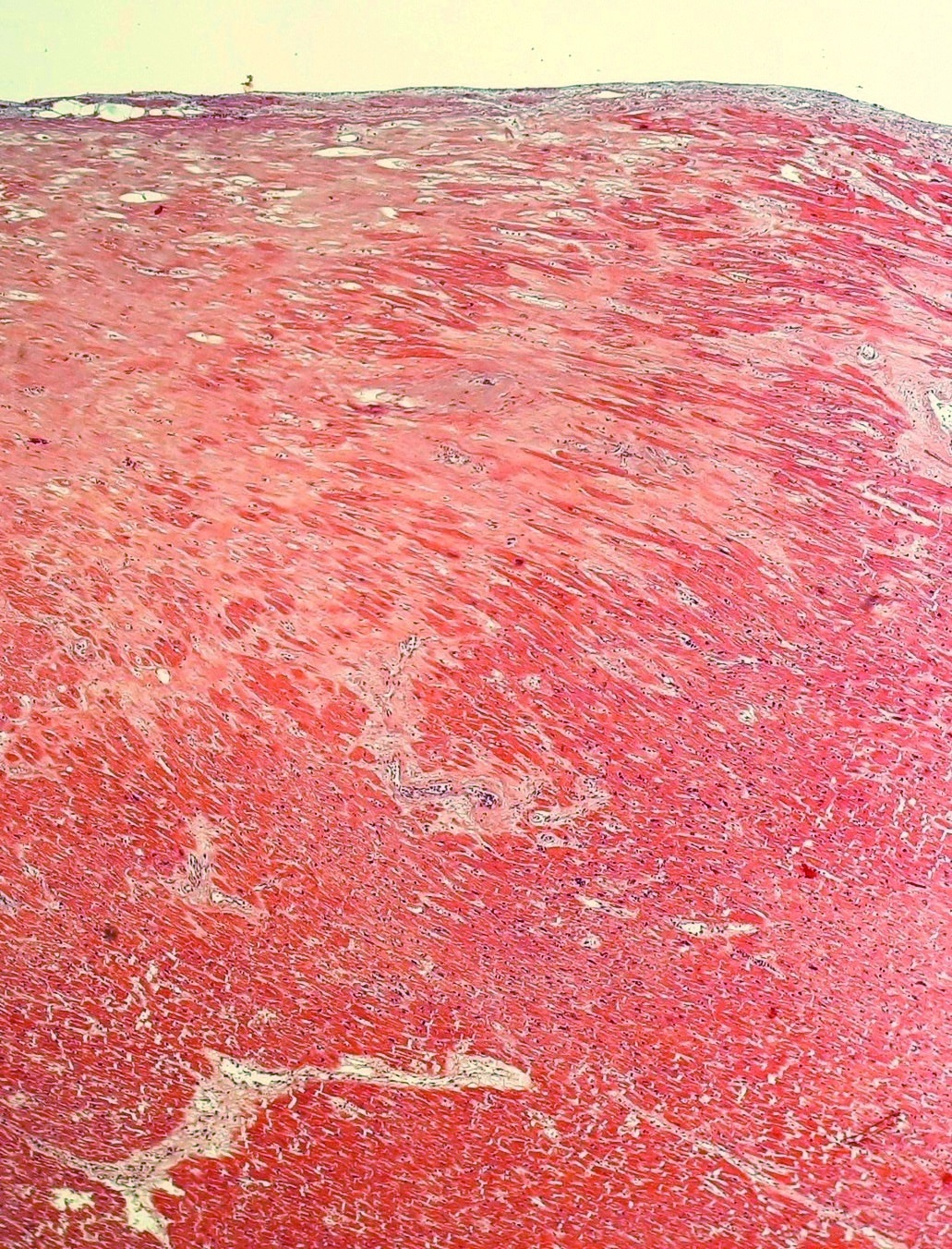
Subepicardial fibrosis (epicardium at top)

=== Chronological ===
| Time | Gross examination | Histopathology by light microscopy |
|---|---|---|
| 0 - 0.5 hours | None (Note: For the first ~30 minutes no change at all can be seen by gross examination or by light microscopy in histopathology. However, in electron microscopy relaxed myofibrils, as well as glycogen loss and mitochondrial swelling can be observered.) | None |
| 0.5 – 4 hours | None (Note: It is often possible, however, to highlight the area of necrosis that first becomes apparent after 2 to 3 hours by immersion of tissue slices in a solution of triphenyltetrazolium chloride. This dye imparts a brick-red color to intact, noninfarcted myocardium where the dehydrogenase activity is preserved. Because dehydrogenases are depleted in the area of ischemic necrosis (i.e., they leak out through the damaged cell membranes), an infarcted area is revealed as an unstained pale zone. Instead of a triphenyltetrazolium chloride dye, a LDH (lactate dehydrogenase) dye can also be used to visualize an area of necrosis.) | Glycogen Depletion, as seen with a PAS Stain; Possibly waviness of fibers at border |
| 4 – 12 hours | Sometimes dark mottling | Initiation of coagulation necrosis; Edema; Hemorrhage |
| 12 – 24 hours | Dark mottling | Ongoing coagulation necrosis; Karyopyknosis; Hypereosinophilia of myocytes; Contraction band necrosis in margins; Beginning of neutrophil infiltration |
| 1 – 3 days | Infarct center becomes yellow-tan | Continued coagulation necrosis; Loss of nuclei and striations; Increased infiltration of neutrophils to interstitium |
| 3 – 7 days | Hyperemia at border; Softening yellow-tan center | Beginning of disintegration of dead muscle fibers; Apoptosis of neutrophils; Beginning of macrophage removal of dead cells at border |
| 7 – 10 days | Maximally soft and yellow-tan; Red-tan margins | Increased phagocytosis of dead cells at border; Beginning of granulation tissue formation at margins |
| 10 – 14 days | Red-gray and depressed borders | Mature granulation tissue with type I collagen |
| 2 – 8 weeks | Gray-white granulation tissue | Increased collagen deposition; Decreased cellularity |
| More than 2 months | Completed scarring (Note: Once scarring is completed, there is yet no common method of discerning the actual age of the infarct, since e.g. a scar that is four months old looks identical to a scar that is ten years old.) | Dense collagenous scar formed |
If not else specified in boxes, then reference is nr

== See also ==
- Myocardial infarction management
- Myocardial infarction complications
