= Soft tissue pathology =

Subspecialty of surgical pathology

Soft tissue pathology is the subspecialty of surgical pathology which deals with the diagnosis and characterization of neoplastic and non-neoplastic diseases of the soft tissues, such as muscle, adipose tissue, tendons, fascia, and connective tissues. Many malignancies of the soft tissues are challenging for the pathologist to diagnose through gross examination and microscopy alone, and additional tools such as immunohistochemistry, electron microscopy, and molecular pathology techniques are sometimes employed to obtain a definitive diagnosis.
