= Lauren Ackerman =

American physician and pathologist (1905–1993)

- Born: March 12, 1905; Auburn, New York
- Died: July 27, 1993 (aged 88); New York City
- Education: Hamilton College (B.S.) & University of Rochester (M.D.)
- Known for: Research in Surgical pathology
- Scientific career
- Fields: Medicine & Pathology
- Institutions: University of California, San Francisco; Ellis Fischel Cancer Center; Washington University in St. Louis; Stony Brook University
- Notable students: Juan Rosai

Lauren Vedder Ackerman (March 12, 1905 – July 27, 1993) was an American physician and pathologist, who championed the subspecialty of surgical pathology in the mid-20th century.

== Early life ==
Ackerman was born in March 1905 in Auburn, New York, to Bertha (née Vedder) and John Ackerman. Both of his parents were college graduates. His father was a civil and mechanical engineer, who later became city manager of Watertown, New York. Despite growing up in a learned family environment, Lauren was an indifferent student with mediocre grades. After high school graduation in 1923 Ackerman began his college studies at St. Lawrence University (Canton, New York), later transferring to, and graduating from, Hamilton College (Clinton, New York) in 1927 with a B.S. degree in engineering. He worked for the next year in that profession, but then decided to pursue a medical career.

== Education ==
Lauren was accepted to the University of Rochester School of Medicine and Dentistry (Rochester, New York), then a new facility. Its faculty provided virtually individual attention to the students, a practice that Ackerman was to adopt himself in the future. After obtaining his M.D. in 1932, he served as an intern and resident in internal medicine at the University of California, San Francisco under the chairmanship of William Kerr. A year's sabbatical from training was necessary because Ackerman had contracted tuberculosis as a medical student. As a patient in a local sanitarium, he helped to pass the time by assisting at autopsies performed on less fortunate cohorts.

After completion of his medicine residency, Lauren pursued specialty training in pathology. He returned to the University of Rochester, where he worked under the direction of George Whipple. After a year, Ackerman moved to Boston, Massachusetts as a resident working principally at the Pondville State Cancer Hospital. He completed his studies there in 1938, and married Elizabeth Fitts the same year.

== Career ==
With no available pathology positions in the offing, Ackerman accepted a position as assistant professor of medicine back at UCSF in 1939. There he was responsible for performing autopsies on patients who had died of pulmonary diseases. In 1940, a job in pathology was offered to Ackerman at the Ellis Fischel Cancer Hospital (EFCH) in Columbia, Missouri, a state-run center for indigent patients with malignancies. Because of his background in clinical medicine, he also had duties in electrocardiography and radiotherapy. After several years of experience there, Ackerman authored his first book, Cancer: Diagnosis, Treatment, and Prognosis, with Juan Del Regato, a radiotherapist. A progressively closer professional relationship grew with surgeons at nearby Barnes Hospital and Washington University School of Medicine, several of whom also had appointments at EFCH. In 1948, Ackerman was offered a position at Barnes Hospital as the chief surgical pathologist and associate professor of surgery, under the chairmanship of Evarts Ambrose Graham (it was then a common practice for surgical pathologists to be part of surgery faculties).

Ackerman accrued experience in diagnostic surgical pathology over the succeeding several years. In the early 1950s, he decided to apply that knowledge to the formulation of a textbook, which was and published in 1953 with the title Surgical Pathology. Although other texts on the topic did exist—notably one by William Boyd—Ackerman's monograph focused on differential diagnosis and the clinical significance of morphologic findings. Accordingly, it rapidly drew attention and acclaim from other practicing pathologists.

Ackerman wrote peer-reviewed publications about surgical pathological subjects throughout the early and mid-1950s. Consequently, he received and accepted many invitations to present seminars around the world. During those travels, Ackerman was introduced to the best young pathologists that many countries had to offer, and several such individuals were invited to St. Louis to further their training with him. American physicians wishing to become surgical pathologists were also increasingly drawn to Barnes Hospital. A steady stream of Ackerman-trained surgical pathology fellows emerged during the next 20 years, many of whom became renowned practitioners and educators. The Ackerman "method" involved thorough morphologic analysis, correlation of pathologic findings with detailed clinical information, and active consultation with attending physicians to assure optimal patient care.

After a 25-year tenure, Ackerman retired as a professor at the Washington University School of Medicine in 1973.

== Post-retirement ==
Ackerman moved back to New York state with his wife, and took an adjunct faculty position at the Stony Brook University (SBU). He continued to lecture actively at an international level, but he assigned editorship of his surgical pathology textbook to Juan Rosai, who continued to oversee Rosai & Ackerman's Surgical Pathology through its 10th edition.

== Recognition ==
Ackerman received the Janeway Medal of the American Radium Society; the Fred W. Stewart Award from Memorial Sloan Kettering Cancer Center of New York City; the Gold-Headed Cane Award from the American Association of Pathologists; the Distinguished Service Award from Washington University; the Prix de Paris Award from the Institute Gustave-Roussy in Villejuif, France; and the City of Paris Award from Paris, France.

== Personal life ==
Ackerman was a skilled pool player; an avid fisherman and golfer; a lover of art, literature, and classical music; and a connoisseur of fine food and wine. He had four children and 13 grandchildren. His first wife, Elizabeth, died of complications of plasmacytic myeloma in 1981. Late in life, Ackerman married Carol Blum, a professor of French and Italian at SBU.

== Death ==
In mid-1993, Ackerman developed abdominal complaints and was found to have peritoneal carcinomatosis from a colonic cancer. He died on July 27 of that year.
