= Pasteurellosis =

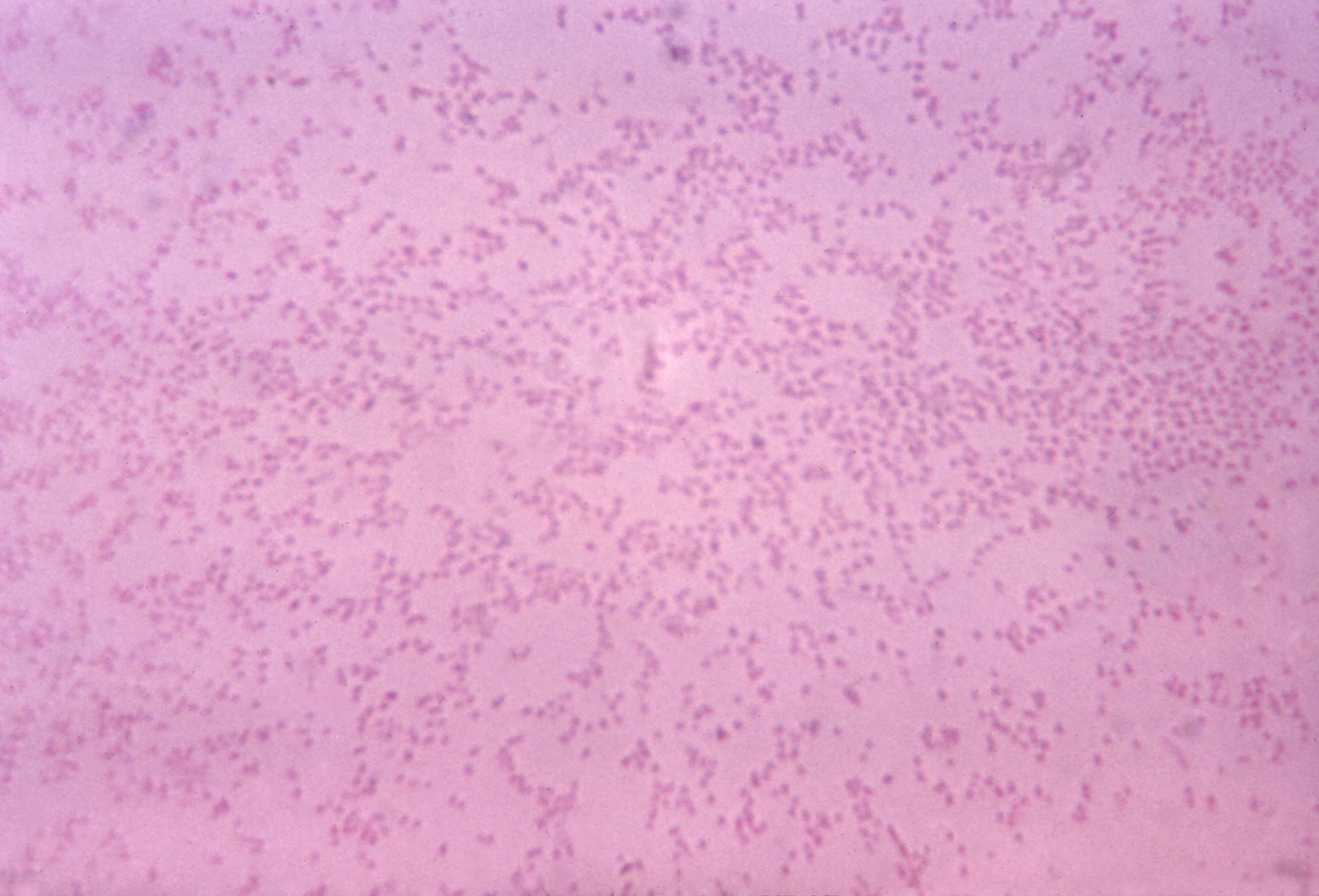
- Gram-stained photomicrograph depicting numerous Pasteurella multocida bacteria
- Specialty: Infectious diseases, veterinary medicine

Pasteurellosis is an infection with a species of the bacterial genus Pasteurella, which is found in humans and other animals.

Pasteurella multocida (subspecies P. m. septica and P. m. multocida) is carried in the mouth and respiratory tract of various animals, including pigs. It is a small, Gram-negative bacillus with bipolar staining by Wayson stain. In animals, it can originate in fulminant septicaemia (chicken cholera), but is also a common commensal.

Until taxonomic revision in 1999, Mannheimia spp. were classified as Pasteurella spp., and infections by organisms now called Mannheimia spp., as well as by organisms now called Pasteurella spp., were designated as pasteurellosis. The term "pasteurellosis" is often still applied to mannheimiosis, although such usage has declined.

== Types ==
The several forms of the infection are:

- Skin/subcutaneous tissue disease is a septic phlegmon that develops classically in the hand and forearm after a cat bite. Inflammatory signs are very rapid to develop; in 1 or 2 hours, edema, severe pain, and serosanguineous exudate appear. Fever, moderate or very high, can be seen, along with vomiting, headache, and diarrhea. Lymphangitis is common. Complications are possible, in the form of septic arthritis, osteitis, or evolution to chronicity.
- Sepsis is very rare, but can be as fulminant as septicaemic plague, with high fever, rigors, and vomiting, followed by shock and coagulopathy.
- Pneumonia disease is also rare and appears in patients with some chronic pulmonary pathology. It usually presents as bilateral consolidating pneumonia, sometimes very severe.
- Zoonosis, pasteurellosis can be transmitted to humans through cats.

Other locations are possible, such as septic arthritis, meningitis, and acute endocarditis, but are very rare.

== Diagnosis ==
Diagnosis is made with isolation of Pasteurella multocida in a normally sterile site (blood, pus, or cerebrospinal fluid).

== Treatment ==
As the infection is usually transmitted to humans through animal bites, antibiotics usually treat the infection, but medical attention should be sought if the wound is severely swollen. Pasteurellosis is usually treated with high-dose penicillin if severe. Either tetracycline or chloramphenicol provides an alternative in beta-lactam-intolerant patients. However, it is most important to treat the wound.

== Animals ==
P. multocida causes numerous pathological conditions in domestic animals. It often acts with other infectious agents, such as Chlamydia and Mycoplasma species and viruses. Environmental conditions (transportation, housing deficiency, and bad weather) also play a role.

These diseases are considered caused by P. multocida, alone or associated with other pathogens:

- Shipping fever in cattle and sheep ("shipping fever" may also be caused by Mannheimia haemolytica, in the absence of P. multocida, and M. haemolytica serovar A1 is known as the most common cause of the disease. The pathologic condition commonly arises where the causative organism becomes established by secondary infection, following a primary bacterial or viral infection, which may occur after stress, e.g., from handling or transport.)
- Enzootic pneumonia of sheep (and goats, with frequent intervention of M. haemolytica)
- Fowl cholera (chicken and other domestic poultry and cage birds)
- Enzootic pneumonia and atrophic rhinitis of pigs
- Pasteurellosis of chinchillas
- Pasteurellosis of rabbits
- Pasteurellosis is suspected to be the cause of recurrent mass mortality of Saiga antelopes.

== See also ==
- Hemorrhagic septicemia
- Pasteurellaceae
