= Maude Abbott Medical Museum =

Medical museum in Montréal, Canada

Coordinates: 45°30′26″N 73°34′47″W

The Maude Abbott Medical Museum (French: Musée Médical Maude Abbott) is a medical museum located at McGill University in Montreal, Quebec, Canada. The museum is named after Canadian doctor Maude Abbott, who served as its curator in the late 19th century.

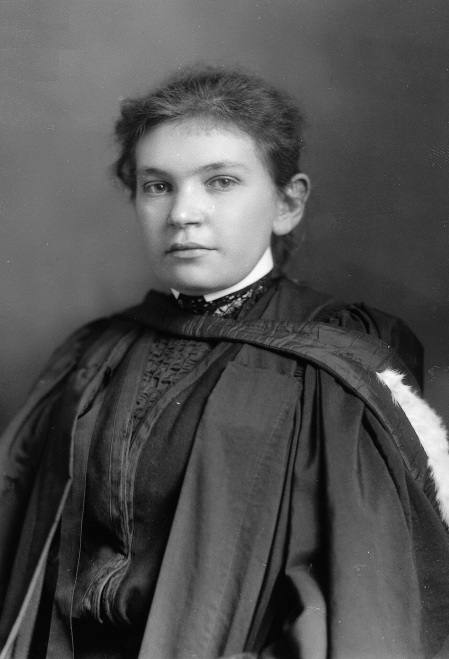
Maude Abbott

== History ==
The museum originally consisted of collections of "interesting specimens," owned by university professors. In the late 19th century, the collection included dissection room specimens from the collection of F.J. Shepherd, skeletons, bones, and models made of papier-mâché, wax, and plaster. William Osler donated almost 500 post-mortem specimens. The specimens came from the Université de Montréal Faculty of Veterinary Medicine and the Montreal General Hospital. Wyatt Johnson also contributed to the collection. The museum was curated by a junior faculty member. In 1894, the museum was located in two rooms at the medical building. In 1898, Maude Abbott became assistant curator of the museum. She is credited with organizing the collection via catalogue system. In 1899, she was named curator.

== Collection ==
=== The Osler Collection ===
The Osler collection once consisted of 180 specimens by 1899, though only about 130 remained by 1935.

=== The Abbott Collection ===
The Maude Abbott collection consists of specimens from animals and humans with cardiovascular anomalies.
