= Contraction band necrosis =

Medical condition

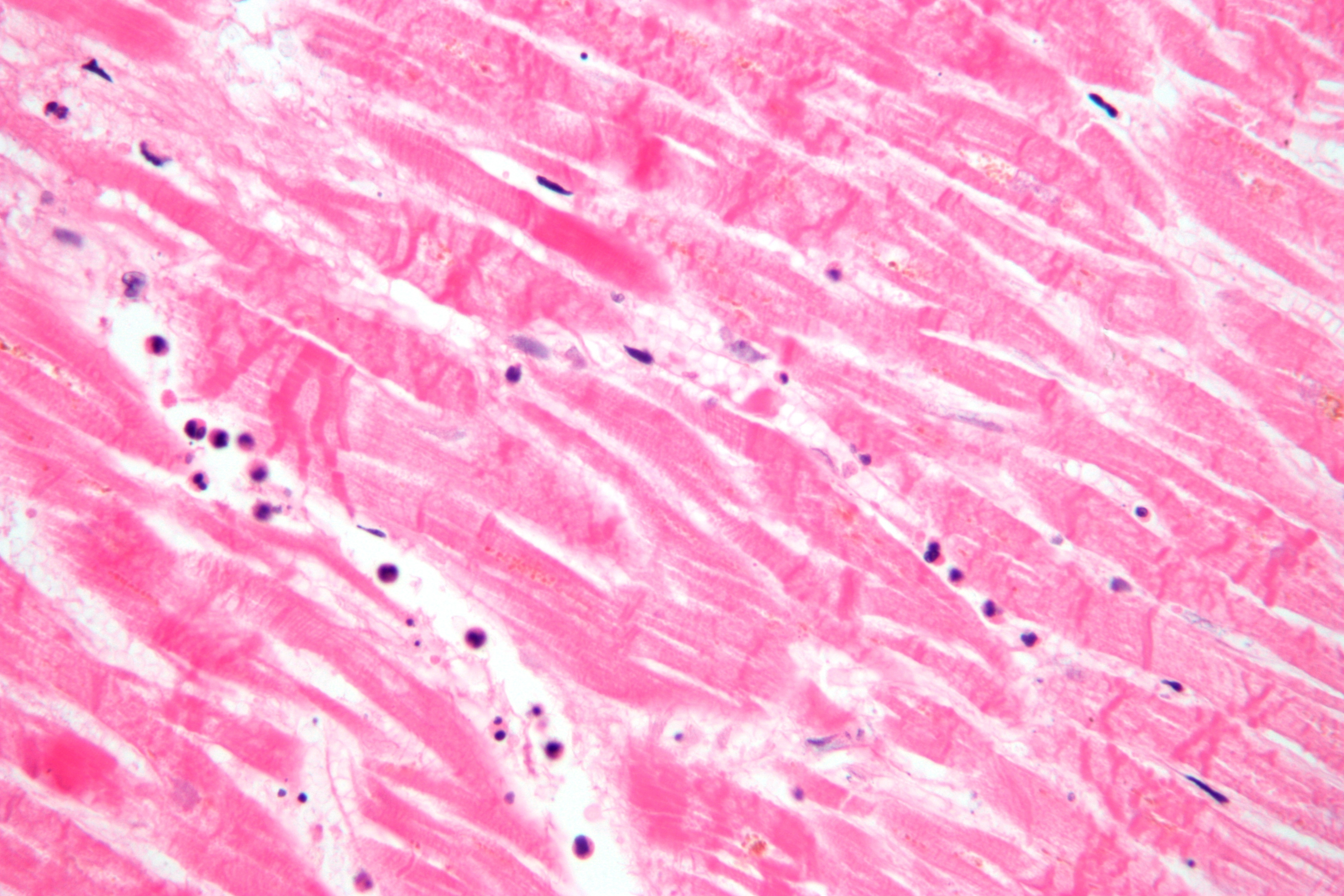
High magnification micrograph showing contraction band necrosis and karyolysis. H&E stain.

Contraction band necrosis is a type of uncontrolled cell death (necrosis) unique to cardiac myocytes and thought to arise in reperfusion from hypercontraction, which results in sarcolemmal rupture.

It is a characteristic histologic finding of a recent myocardial infarction (heart attack) that was partially reperfused.

The name of the histopathologic finding comes from the appearance under the microscope; contraction bands are thick intensely eosinophilic staining bands (typically 4-5 micrometres wide) that span the short axis of the myocyte. They can be thought of extra thick striae, typical of cardiac muscle and striated muscle.

== Pathophysiology ==
Contraction band necrosis is thought to arise by two mechanisms:

1. a calcium-dependent mechanism - activation of the contractile machinery of the cell via its usual mechanism, calcium, which is in excess due to ischemia.
2. a calcium-independent mechanism, as seen in rigor mortis - activation of the contractile machinery in the setting of low ATP.

Reperfusion associated cell death has been modulated (reduced) in animal studies and is an area of active research, which holds the potential to significantly reduce the morbidity and mortality of cardiovascular disease.

== Additional images ==
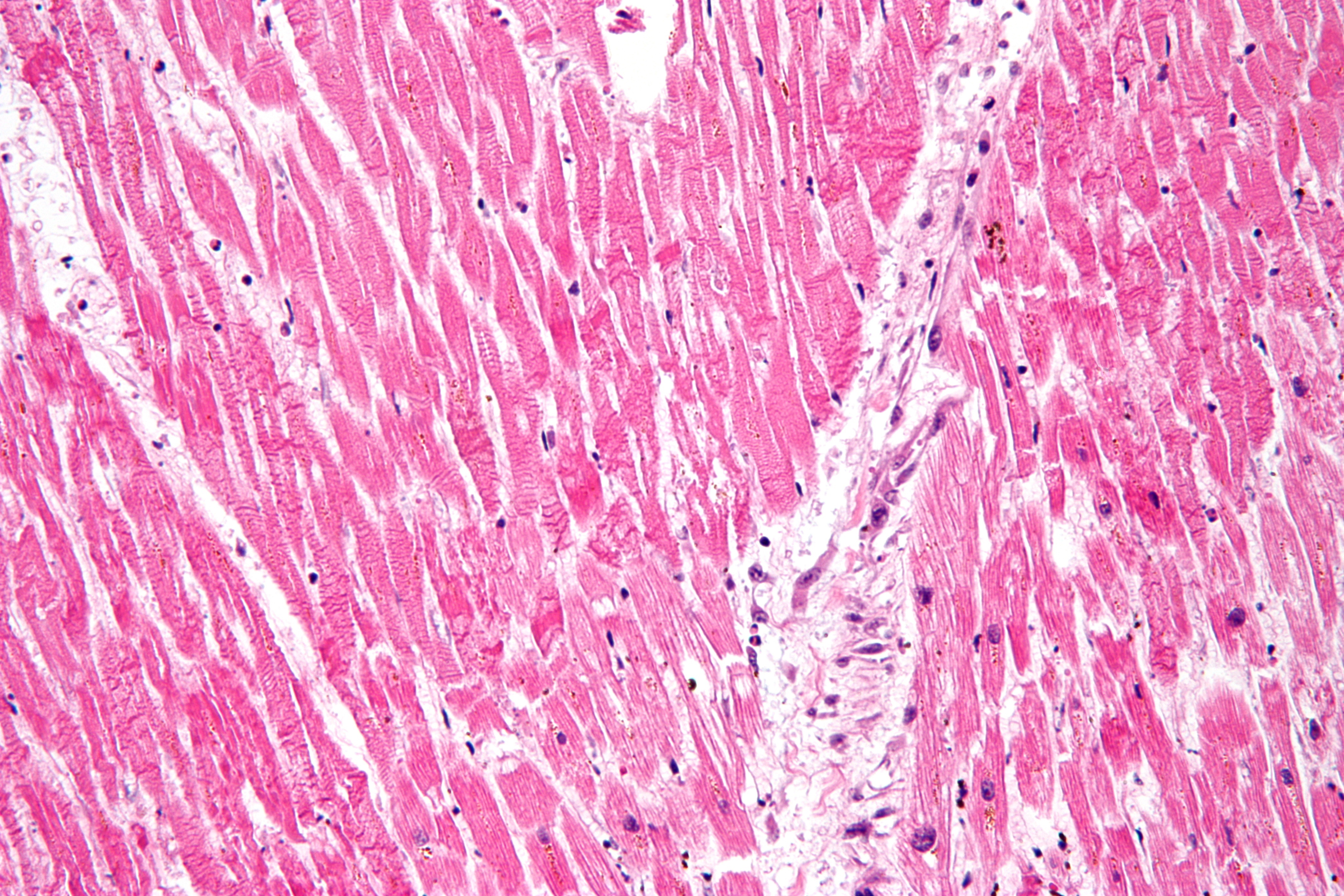
Contraction band necrosis. H&E stain.

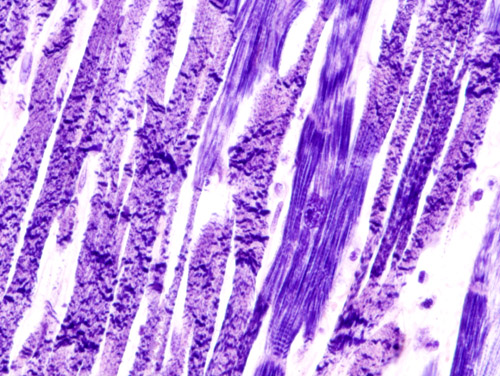
Contraction band necrosis. PTAH.

== See also ==
- Myocardial infarction
- Timeline of myocardial infarction pathology
- Guanylyl cyclase
