= Laboratory Investigation =

- Discipline: Pathology
- Language: English
- Edited by: David M. Berman

Publication details
- Publisher: Elsevier
- Frequency: Monthly
- Impact factor: 5.0 (2022)

Standard abbreviations
- ISO 4: Lab. Investig.
- NLM: Lab Invest

Indexing
- ISSN: 0023-6837 (print); 1530-0307 (web)

Links
- Journal homepage

Laboratory Investigation is a peer-reviewed medical journal of pathology published by Elsevier. It is the official journal of the United States and Canadian Academy of Pathology. The journal is published monthly, with one supplemental issue per year.

According to the Journal Citation Reports, Laboratory Investigation has a 2022 impact factor of 5.0, ranking it 14th out of 76 in the category Pathology.

== Aims and Scope ==
Laboratory Investigation offers prompt publication of high-quality original research that advances the understanding and classification of human disease.

Types of Articles

Research Article: Research that elucidates the pathogenesis or classification of human disease, including original mechanistic or correlative studies that translate experimental, observational, computational, or technologic research findings.

Review Article: Review Articles require prior approval of the Editor. Review articles must be of general interest to pathologists and contain original, in-depth analysis of the chosen topic.

== Abstracting and indexing ==
Laboratory Investigation is abstracted and indexed in the following databases

- Index Medicus
- Current Contents/Life Sciences
- Science Citation Index
- Excerpta Medica
