= Gynecologic pathology =

Medical branch on diseases

Gynecologic pathologist
Occupation
- Names: Physician
- Occupation type: Specialty
- Activity sectors: Medicine

Description
- Education required: Doctor of Medicine (M.D.); Doctor of Osteopathic medicine (D.O.); Bachelor of Medicine, Bachelor of Surgery (M.B.B.S.); Bachelor of Medicine, Bachelor of Surgery (MBChB)
- Fields of employment: Hospitals, Clinics

Gynecologic pathology is the medical pathology subspecialty dealing with the study and diagnosis of disease involving the female genital tract. A physician who practices gynecologic pathology is a gynecologic pathologist. The term originates from the Greek gyno-(gynaikos) meaning "woman" and the suffix -ology, meaning "study of".

Gynecologic pathologists specialize in the tissue-based diagnosis of diseases of the female reproductive system. This includes neoplastic diseases of the vulva, vagina, cervix, endometrium, fallopian tube, uterus, and ovary, as well as non-neoplastic diseases of these structures.

In the United States, gynecologic pathology training typically involves obtaining a medical doctorate, followed by residency in anatomic pathology or combined anatomic and clinical pathology certified by the American Board of Pathology. Fellowship training in surgical pathology or gynecologic pathology are additional credentials toward a career as a gynecological pathologist.

== See also ==
- Gynecological pathology, including diseases of the female genital tract and the placenta
- Anatomic pathology
- Cytopathology
