= Cardiac pathology =

History and research fields of cardiac pathology

Cardiac pathology is the subspecialty of pathology which deals with diseases and disorders that affect the heart. It encompasses a broad range of conditions, including structural, functional, and biochemical abnormalities that impair the pumping activities of the heart. Cardiac pathology is closely tied to evolution of medical science, autopsy practices and our understanding on cardiovascular system. Major categories of cardiac pathology are congenital heart disease congenital heart defect, ischemic heart disease coronary artery disease, hypertensive heart disease, valvular heart disease, cardiomyopathy, inflammatory heart diseases such as infective endocarditis, heart failure, arrhythmia, diseases of pericardium, neoplastic disorders and other conditions. Major application areas of the knowledge on cardiac pathology are education for health professionals, autopsy services, hospital pathology services surgical pathology including heart transplantation.

== History of cardiac pathology ==
Evidence of heart disease dates back thousands of years, including signs of astherosclerosis in ancient Egyptian mummies. The field has since moved from early anatomical description to modern diagnostic imaging and cardiac surgery.

=== Ancient and classical periods ===
There is a painting of a mammoth with what looks like a red heart in its chest in El Pindal Cave, Spain, dating from 15,000 years ago. Possibly drawn as a target, prehistoric humans understood the heart meant life or death. Ancient Chinese believed the heart was the seat of intelligence and mind. Xin, the ancient Chinese word for heart, was also translated "heart-mind." The heart ruled the body.

Hippocrates (460–370 BCE) recognized the heart as a central organ, but its function was poorly understood. Early physicians believed it played a role in emotions rather than circulation. Aristotle (384–322 BCE) described the heart as the source of heat and life, but his anatomical understanding was limited. Galen (129–216 CE) made significant contributions by describing heart chambers and valves, though he misunderstood the circulatory system, believing blood flowed in a two-way system between arteries and veins.

=== Renaissance and pre-modern period (14th–19th century) ===
Andreas Vesalius (1514–1564) revolutionized anatomy by performing human dissections and accurately describing the heart's structure, correcting many of Galen's errors. William Harvey (1578–1657) published Exercitatio Anatomica de Motu Cordis et Sanguinis in Animalibus (On the Motion of the Heart and Blood), explaining the systemic circulation of blood and the heart's role as a pump. This was a monumental step in understanding cardiac function.

Giovanni Battista Morgagni (1682–1771), known as the "Father of Modern Pathology", correlated clinical symptoms with postmortem findings, including those related to heart diseases. Matthew Baillie (1761–1823) published the first detailed descriptions of coronary artery disease, aneurysms, and cardiomyopathies in The Morbid Anatomy of Some of the Most Important Parts of the Human Body. Rudolf Virchow (1821–1902) advanced the field of cellular pathology, linking atherosclerosis and thrombosis to vascular and cardiac diseases.

=== Discovery of cardiac-specific diseases (19th century) ===
Understanding of coronary artery disease (CAD) improved with better recognition of atherosclerosis, myocardial infarction, and angina. Valvular heart disease became known, and rheumatic fever and its effects on heart valves were extensively studied. Early classifications of cardiomyopathies began emerging, though their etiology remained unclear.

=== Technological advances and modern era (20th century) ===
In 1903, Willem Einthoven developed the first electrocardiography (ECG) device, enabling non-invasive study of heart rhythm and ischemic changes. Echocardiography (also known as ultrasound) and imaging technologies provided real-time insights into structural and functional cardiac abnormalities.

Advances in histopathology arose from improved microscopic techniques, which allowed for detailed examination of myocardial tissue, contributing to the understanding of myocarditis, cardiomyopathy, and amyloidosis.

=== Molecular and genetic era (late 20th–21st century) ===
Molecular pathology: The role of genes in cardiac diseases, such as hypertrophic cardiomyopathy and arrhythmogenic cardiomyopathy, became evident. Cardiac markers: Discovery of cardiac-specific biomarkers, like troponin, revolutionized the diagnosis of myocardial infarction. Cardiac Biopsies: Became standard for diagnosing inflammatory and infiltrative conditions, such as myocarditis and sarcoidosis.

Postmortem studies through autopsy remain crucial for understanding sudden cardiac death and rare cardiac conditions, while techniques like cardiac MRI and CT provide detailed insights into cardiac pathology without the need for invasive procedures.

Genetic testing and personalized therapies have also become integral to diagnosing and managing inherited cardiac disorders.

== Cardiac pathology for education ==
The study of cardiac pathology is critically important subject because it provides medical students and healthcare professionals with the foundational knowledge necessary to understand, diagnose, and manage cardiovascular diseases effectively. Key reasons why this subject is important are as follows; 1. High prevalence of cardiovascular diseases. 2. Integration of basic and clinical sciences. 3. Critical roles in diagnosis. 4. Basis for effective treatment and management.

== Cardiac pathology for autopsy ==
Cardiac pathology and neuropathology are the two most critical part of most autopsy services because heart and brain are the most vital organs of the body. The cardiac pathology in particular is very important at autopsy services because it provides valuable insights into cause of death, underlying conditions, medico-legal implication and public health and epidemiology. The coronary atherosclerosis and myocardial infarction are most common life threatening condition of heart and they are primary target of assessment in autopsies for victims of sudden death. Cardiac diseases are closely interrelated that ischemic heart diseases are common in patient with hypertension and valvular heart disease. In those with heart diseases, the left ventricular wall is thick and the myocardial demand for coronary arterial supply is increased. The understanding on the pathogenesis of cardiovascular diseases is invaluable for interpretation of autopsy findings.

== Cardiac pathology for hospital pathology services ==
Cardiac pathology is not a major part of surgical pathology services in hospitals. But there are some critical conditions that cardiac pathology contributes to clinical practices in hospitals. Heart transplantation pathology is an example and histopathological study of endomyocardial biopsy specimens are used to reveal the myocardial condition with acute cellular rejection of antibody mediated rejection. Also the whole heart resected for transplantation is examined to reveal the disease of the failed heart. Diagnostic biopsy for myocardium is often applied when the ventricular contraction is impaired without clear cause. Amyloidosis and inflammatory myocardial diseases myocarditis are examples. Diseased valve is resected for replacement with artificial valve and pathology confirmed the valvular disease. Cardiac neoplasm is rare but a myxoma is a common cause of primary intracardiac mass. Maligant lesion of intima or intimal angiosarcoma also occur as a primary tumor in the heart. Metastatic lesions may occur in the heart, usually at the pericardium.
