= Phosphotungstic acid-haematoxylin stain =

Biological stain used for staining of tissues

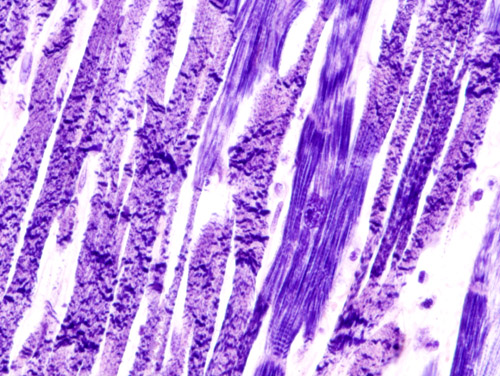
Phosphotungstic acid-haematoxylin staining demonstrating contraction band necrosis in an individual who had a myocardial infarction (heart attack).

Phosphotungstic acid haematoxylin (PTAH) is a mix of haematoxylin with phosphotungstic acid, used in histology for staining.

It stains some tissue in contrasting colors in a way similar to haematoxylin and eosin stain, as phosphotungstic acid binds to tissue proteins. It is used to show gliosis in the central nervous system, tumours of skeletal muscles, and fibrin deposits in lesions. Muscle is stained blue-black to dark brown, connective tissue is pale orange-pink to brownish red, fibrin and neuroglia stain deep blue, coarse elastic fibers show as purple, and bone and cartilage obtain yellowish to brownish red color.

PTAH is ideal for demonstrating striated muscle fibers and mitochondria, often without a counterstain. As such, it is used to identify contraction bands, as seen in contraction band necrosis.

PTAH can be helpful in diagnosing oncocytomas, infantile digital fibromas.

PTAH stains ependymomas while it does not stain choroid plexus papillomas, providing one means of differentiating these tumors.

This technique has been largely replaced by immunohistochemistry techniques.

== Staining principle ==
There is much more phosphotungstic acid in the solution than hematein. The phosphotungstic acid binds all of the available hematein to form a blue lake pigment. This lake stains the muscle cross striations, fibrin, nuclei, and other tissue elements blue. The rest of the phosphotungstic acid stains the red-brown components, such as collagen.

== Staining procedural notes ==
Zenker fixative is preferred, although formalin fixed tissue can be used. If this is the case, the tissue should be mordanted in Zenkers solution before staining. Most texts recommend mordanting in Zenker fixative overnight at room temperature, but it can be done for 3.5 hours in a 56 to 60 degrees Celsius oven.

PTAH solution, Gram Iodine, 5% sodium thiosulfate, 0.25% Potassium Permanganate, and 5% Oxalic Acid solution are needed.

After staining, slides should be dehydrated quickly because the red-brown components lose their color when exposed to water or alcohol.
