= Horst Oertel =

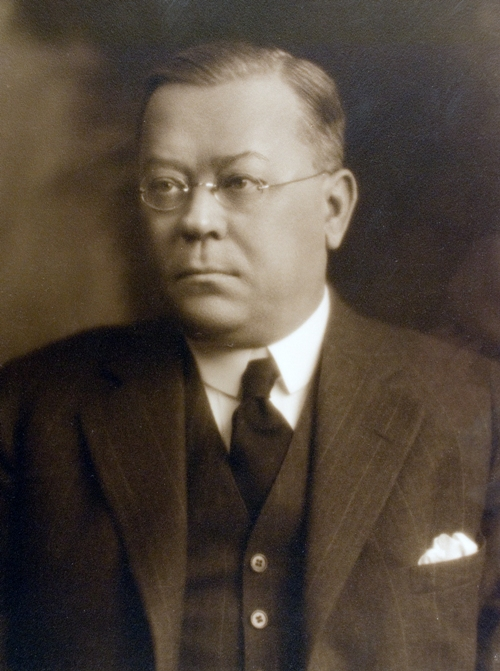
- Born: Horst Oertel; January 25, 1871; Dresden, Germany
- Died: January 9, 1956 (aged 84); London, England
- Occupation: Chief of Pathology at McGill University

Horst Oertel (January 25, 1871 – January 9, 1956) M.D., Emeritus Professor and Head of Pathology at McGill University, Montreal (1918–1938), he was well-known on both sides of the Atlantic. Five of his books are still published today (all republished within the last five years from 2007 to 2010) as standard texts for students of Pathology.

== Career ==
Horst Oertel was born in Dresden, Germany. His parents emigrated to New York City when he was fourteen. He studied Medicine at Yale University, graduating in 1894. His postgraduate studies in pathology were undertaken at the universities of Berlin, Leipzig and Würzburg. In Germany, he became greatly influenced by Rudolf Virchow. In 1907, Oertel returned to the United States when he was appointed director and chief pathologist of the Russell Sage Institute of Pathology in New York City. He later undertook a period of study at Guy's Hospital, London.

Oertel came to McGill University in 1914 on the recommendation of John George Adami, and was appointed acting Chair of Pathology in 1918 in consequence of Adami's continuing war service as Inspector of Canadian Hospitals in France.

Oertel succeeded Adami as Professor and head of department in 1919, an election which created much publicity due to his German origins, but despite strong opposition, he received a strong vote of confidence from McGill and Adami alike. In the 1880s, McGill's pathology department had secured an international reputation of excellence under Sir William Osler, who appointed Adami to succeed him. But by the end of the First World War, the discipline and its faculties were ready for major developments, for which Oertel was brought in. In 1924, despite Maude Abbott's objections, he reorganised the Pathology Department and its Museum in time to coincide with their transfer from the Strathcona Medical Building to the newly constructed Pathological Institute.

Oertel continued to direct the pathology department with distinction, and continued until four years past the normal retirement age, as Chancellor Sir Edward Beatty thought so highly of him that he would not hear of his being retired until 1938.

== Reputation ==
Oertel excelled in teaching, bringing together his superior knowledge of Pathology, Philosophy and Humanities to his lectures. He was held in great respect by his students, but he was unpopular with staff internists and surgeons as he strongly believed that pathology was not the handmaiden of medicine and surgery.

His life centred on McGill University, and yet strangely he did not feel obliged to help his fellow staff members if it did not suit him, particularly when it involved cooperation with the research interests of the clinicians. He befriended Sir Vincent Meredith, President of the Royal Victoria Hospital, Montreal, and in the early 1920s defended Meredith's arbitrary appointments that were in the interests of the Royal Vic and not McGill. He was compliant in the Sir Henry Gray affair and later refused to help Wilder Penfield when he was looking for laboratory space for his neuropathology interests. Neither of these events endeared Oertel to his associates.

As a Pathologist, Oertel's first-class reputation remains to this day. No less than five of his books are standard texts for students of Pathology and are still published today (all republished within the last five years from 2007 to 2010), seventy years after his retirement from McGill and fifty years after his death. He lived between his apartments at the University Club and the Ritz-Carlton Montreal. He died a bachelor in London, England.

== Bibliography ==
- General Pathology: An Introduction to the Study of Medicine; Being a Discussion of the Development (last republished, 2009)
- The Anatomic Histological Process of Bright's Disease (last republished 2009)
- General Pathology: An Introduction to the Study of Medicine; Being a Discussion of the Development and Nature of Processes of Disease (last republished 2007)
- General Pathology (last republished 2010)
- The Anatomic Histological Process of Bright's Disease and Their Relation to the Functional Changes: Lectures Delivered in the Russell Sage Institute of Pathology at City Hospital New York, 1909 (last republished 2010)
- The problems, methods and aims of pathology in their past, present and future aspects,: The two introductory lectures to the course in general pathology at McGill university (1929)
- Outlines of Pathology (1927)
- The Pancreas and Diabetic Metabolism (1924)
- The centennial of Rudolf Virchow, 1821-1921 (1921)
- On universities and university methods of instruction and study;: An address before the Medical Ungraduate Society of McGill University, Nov. 17th, 1919
- On the Mechanism of Cancer Development
- The Position of the Circulation in Nephritus
