= Pulmonary pathology =

Pulmonary pathology is the subspecialty of surgical pathology which deals with the diagnosis and characterization of neoplastic and non-neoplastic diseases of the lungs and thoracic pleura. It is the study of diseases affecting the lungs and respiratory system. Diagnostic specimens are often obtained via bronchoscopic transbronchial biopsy, CT-guided percutaneous biopsy, or video-assisted thoracic surgery (VATS). The diagnosis of inflammatory or fibrotic diseases of the lungs is considered by many pathologists to be particularly challenging.
