= Maude Abbott =

Canadian physician (1868/69–1940)

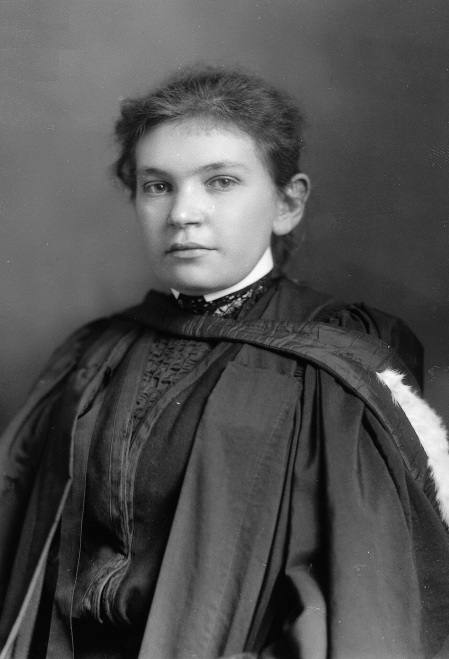
- Born: Maude Elizabeth Seymour Abbott; March 18, 1868; St. Andrews East, Quebec, Canada
- Died: September 2, 1940 (aged 72); Montreal, Quebec
- Education: Bishop's University Faculty of Medicine
- Occupation: Physician
- Known for: Expert on congenital heart disease

Maude Elizabeth Seymour Abbott (March 18, 1868 (Note: Sources disagree on the date of Abbott's birth. The Canadian Encyclopedia, Maude Abbott Medical Museum, and the Dictionary of Canadian Biography are among the sources that support a birthdate of 18 March 1868. However, articles in the Canadian Journal of Cardiology, the Canadian Medical Association Journal, and CHEST Journal all give a birth date of 1869, as do her death certificate and gravestone.) – September 2, 1940) was a Canadian physician and medical researcher whose work contributed to the early study of congenital heart disease.

She was among the first women in Canada to earn a medical degree and one of the first women to receive a Bachelor of Arts from McGill University. After being denied admission to McGill’s medical faculty, she completed her medical education at Bishop’s University and went on to develop a career in pathology, medical curation, and clinical research. Abbott held curatorial and teaching roles at McGill, co-founded the International Association of Medical Museums, and published extensively, including the Atlas of Congenital Cardiac Disease (1936). She was also involved in professional organizations supporting women in medicine. Abbott later received an honorary medical degree from McGill and was posthumously recognized through several national and institutional honours.

== Early life and education ==
Maude Elizabeth Seymour Babin was born in St. Andrews East on 18 March 1868. Both of her parents were absent during infancy, as her mother had died of tuberculosis when Abbott was 7 months old, and her father had abandoned her and her older sister, Alice. The two sisters were legally adopted and raised by their maternal grandmother, Mrs. William Abbott, who was then 62. She was a cousin of John Abbott, Canada's third Prime Minister.

Abbott was home-schooled until she was 15 years old. In 1885, she graduated from a private Montreal seminary high school.

She was initially rejected by McGill University's Faculty of Arts, but was later admitted with a scholarship, completing her Bachelor of Arts degree in 1890, graduating as class valedictorian and receiving the Lord Stanley Gold Medal.

She subsequently applied to study medicine at McGill University. Admission was refused despite petitioning the faculty first privately and then publicly, as the medical school administration was adamant in their refusal to accept a woman.

She was then accepted into medical school at Bishop's University, and while there, was able to undertake clinical training at the Montreal General Hospital alongside McGill's medical students. In 1894, she graduated with the degree of Doctor of Medicine and Master of Surgery (M.D., C.M.) with honours, and was the only woman in her class. She received the Chancellor's Prize and the Senior Anatomy Prize for having the best final examination.

After earning her medical degree, Abbott spent three years in Europe. During this time, she took further courses in pathology and gained practical experience in women’s hospitals and in a psychiatric institution, building on her Canadian medical training.

== Career ==
Later in 1894, she opened her own practice in Montreal, worked with the Royal Victoria hospital, and was nominated and elected as the Montreal Medico-Chirurgical Society's first female member. Some time afterwards, she did her post-graduate medical studies in Vienna.

In 1897, she opened an independent clinic dedicated to treating women and children. There, she did much first-hand research in pathology. Much of Abbott's work concerned the nature of heart disease, especially in newborn babies. This would cause her to be recognized as a world authority on heart defects.

In 1898, she was appointed Assistant Curator at the McGill Pathological Museum, becoming curator in 1901.

In 1905, she was invited to write the chapter on "Congenital Heart Disease" for William Osler's System of Modern Medicine. He declared it "the best thing he had ever read on the subject." The article would place her as the world authority in the field of congenital heart disease.

In 1906, she co-founded the International Association of Medical Museums with Osler. She became its international secretary in 1907. She would edit the institution's articles for thirty-one years (1907-1938).

In 1910, Abbott was awarded an honorary medical degree from McGill and was made a lecturer in Pathology; this was eight years prior to the university admitting female students to the Faculty of Medicine. After too much conflict with Dr. Horst Oërtel, she left McGill to take up a position at the Women's Medical College of Pennsylvania in 1923. In 1925, Abbott returned to McGill, becoming an assistant professor.

In 1924, she was a founder of the Federation of Medical Women of Canada, a Canadian organization committed to the professional, social, and personal advancement of women physicians.

In 1936, she wrote the Atlas of Congenital Cardiac Disease. The work illustrated a new classification system and described records of over a thousand cases of clinical and postmortem records. The same year, she retired from her professorial position.

Abbott was a prolific writer, composing over 140 papers and books. (Note: Laurtenian Heritage WebMagazine cites it as over 100, while Library and Archives Canada suggests over 140.) She also gave countless lectures.

== Death ==
On 2 September 1940, Abbott died from a brain hemorrhage in Montreal.

== Awards and honours ==
=== Academic distinctions ===
- McGill University class valedictorian, recognizing the top graduating student in her class, 1890.
- Lord Stanley Gold Medal, awarded for outstanding academic achievement at McGill University, 1890.
- Chancellor's Prize, awarded for excellence in medical studies, 1894.
- Senior Anatomy Prize, awarded for distinction in anatomical study, 1894.
- Honorary Doctor of Medicine and Master of Surgery (MDCM), awarded by McGill University in recognition of her contributions to medical research and education, 1910.

=== Professional recognition ===
- The International Academy of Pathology established the Maude Abbott Lecture, a named lecture honouring significant contributions to pathology and medical science, 1958.
- Posthumous induction into the Canadian Medical Hall of Fame in recognition of her pioneering work on congenital heart disease, 1994.

=== National and public commemoration ===
- Designated a Person of National Historic Significance by the Historic Sites and Monuments Board of Canada, 1993.
- Canada Post issued a forty-six cent commemorative postage stamp titled The Heart of the Matter honouring her contributions to cardiology, 2000.

=== Institutional memorials ===
- Commemorative plaque installed outside the McIntyre Medical Sciences Building at McGill University in Montreal, 1993.
- Bronze plaque erected on the McIntyre Medical Sciences Building at McGill University commemorating her contributions to pathology and medical education, 2000.
- The congenital heart defect clinic at the McGill University Health Centre named the Maude Clinic in recognition of her pioneering work in congenital heart disease research.
- Depicted in a mural by Diego Rivera at the National Institute of Cardiology in Mexico City, where she is the only Canadian and the only woman represented, 1943.

== Selected works ==
- The Atlas of Congenital Cardiac Disease (Originally published in New York by the American Heart Association in 1936. A reprint was published by McGill-Queen's University Press in 2006 in commemoration of the 100th anniversary of the founding of the International Academy of Pathology." (ISBN 9780773531284)
- Abbott, Maude (1900). "Pigmentation-cirrhosis in a case of Haemochromatosis". Transactions of the Pathological Society of London. Vol. 51–52. London: Smith, Elder & Co. pp. 66–85.
- An Historical Sketch of the Medical Faculty of McGill University. 1902.
- Abbott, Maude E. (1903). "On the Classification of Museum Specimens". American Medicine. V (14): 541–544. hdl:2027/aeu.ark:/13960/t2s480b5s.
- Abbott, Maude E. (March 25, 1905). "The Museum in Medical Teaching". Journal of the American Medical Association. XLIV (12): 935–939. doi:10.1001/jama.1905.92500390019001d.
- Abbott, Maude (1908). "IX: Congenital cardiac disease". In Osler, William (ed.). Modern Medicine: Its Theory and Practice. Vol. IV: Diseases of the circulatory system, diseases of the blood, diseases of the spleen, thymus, and lymph-glands. Philadelphia and New York: Lea & Febiger.
- Abbott, Maude E. (June 1918). "The determination of basal metabolism by the "Respiratory-valve and spirometer method" of indirect calorimetry, with an observation on a case of polycythemia with splenomegaly". Canadian Medical Association Journal. 8 (6): 491–509. PMC 1585182. PMID 20311108.
- Abbott, Maude E. (1916). Florence Nightingale as seen in her portraits (reprint ed.). Boston: Boston Medical and Surgical Journal.
- Abbott, Maude (1921). McGill's Heroic Past, 1821-1921: An Historic Outline of the University from Its Origin to the Present Time. McGill University Press.
- Abbott, M. E.; Meakins, J. C. (1915). "On the differentiation of two forms of congenital dextrocardia". Bulletin of the International Association of Medical Museums. 5: 134–138.
- Abbott, Maude E. (November 1928). "An early Canadian biologist, Michel Sarrazin (1659–1735), His life and times". Canadian Medical Association Journal. 19 (5): 600–607. PMC 1710099. PMID 20317100.—A review of Arthur Vallée's Un biologiste canadien, Michel Sarrazin (1659–1739). Sa vie, ses travaux, et son temps

== See also ==
- List of pathologists
