= Anatomical pathology =

Medical specialty

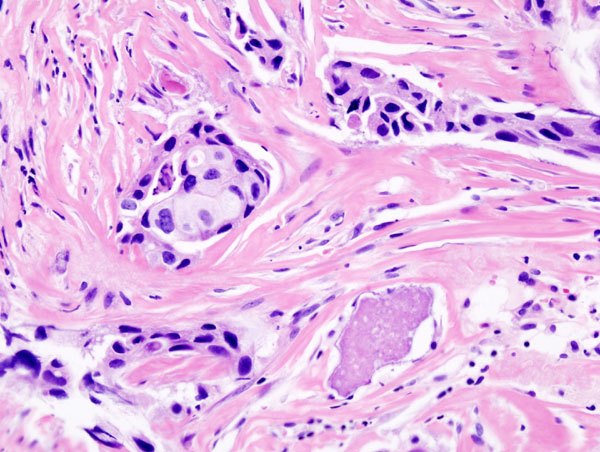
Histopathology: microscopic appearance of invasive ductal carcinoma of the breast. The slide is stained with Haematoxylin & Eosin.

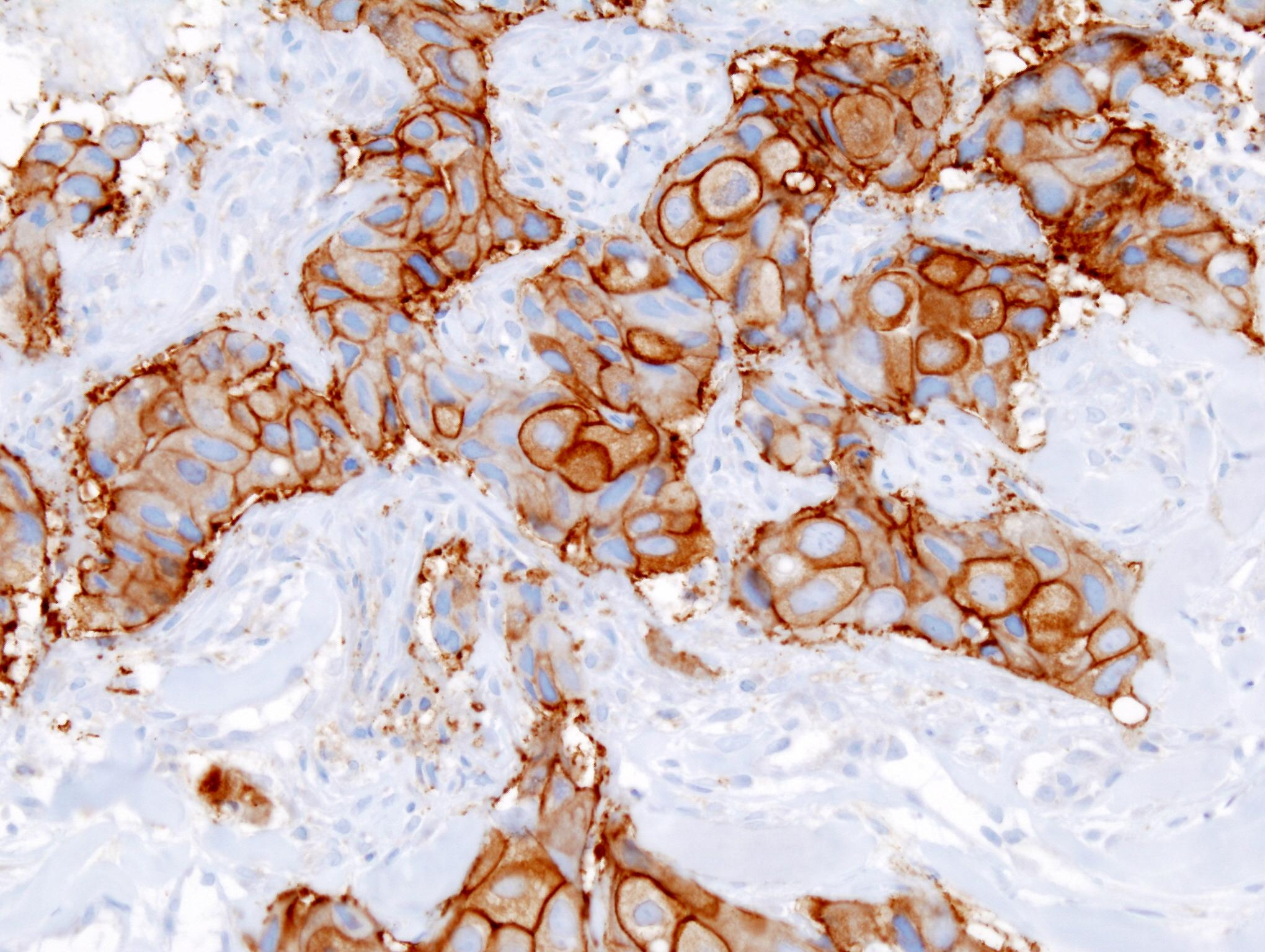
Histopathology: microscopic appearance of invasive ductal carcinoma of the breast. The slide is stained with an antibody (immunohistochemistry) against the oncogene Her2neu. The dark-brown reaction indicates that this tumor over-expresses this gene.

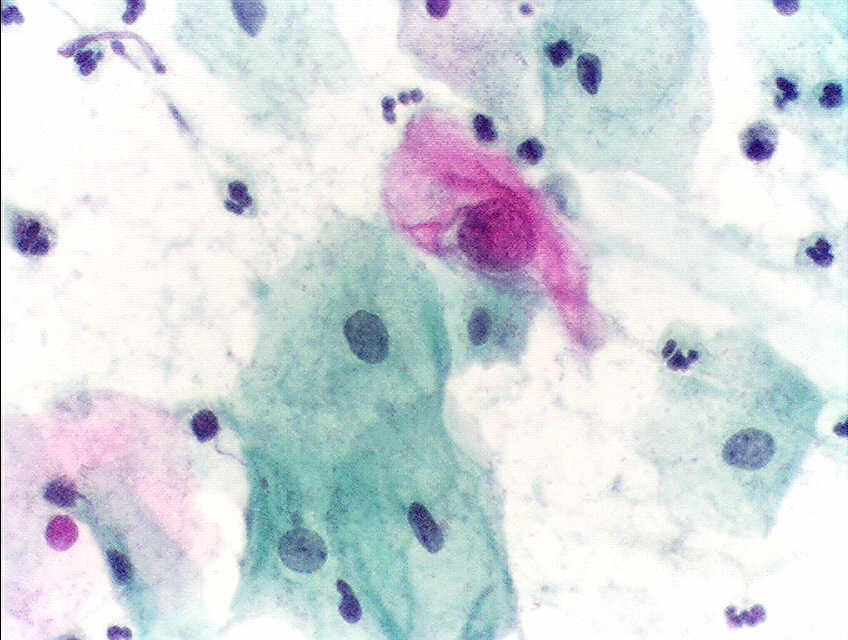
Cytopathology: microscopic appearance of a Pap test. The pink cell at the center with a large nucleus is abnormal, compatible with low-grade dysplasia.

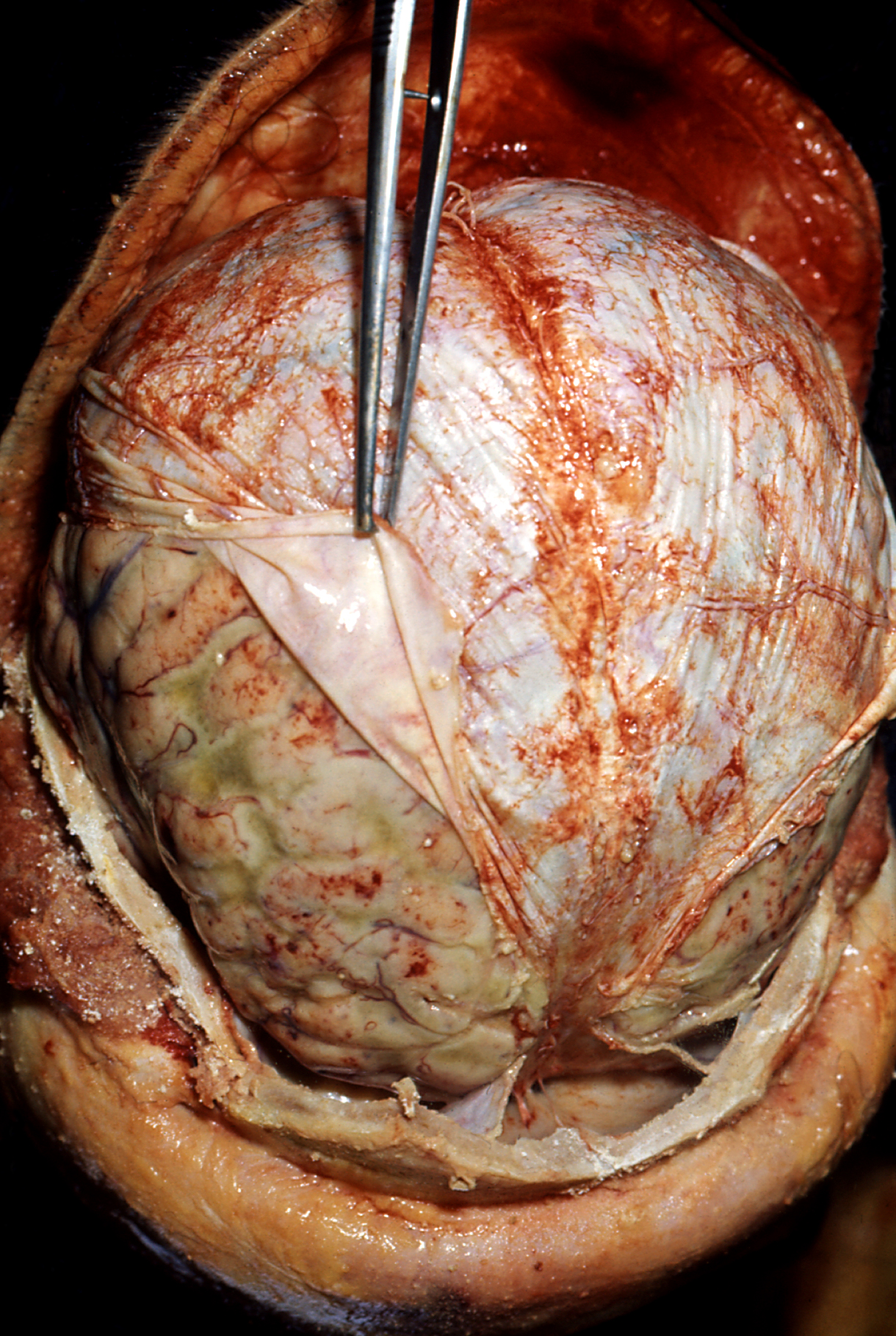
Autopsy: a brain surrounded by pus (the yellow-greyish coat around the brain, under the dura lifted by the forceps), the result of bacterial meningitis.

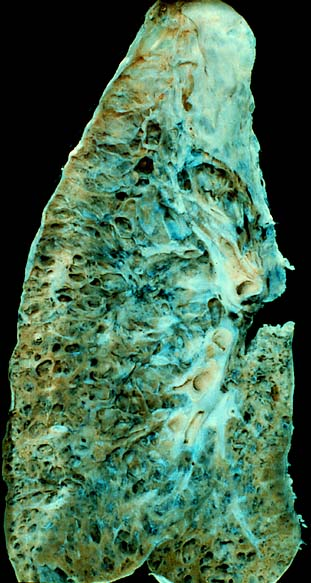
Gross examination: appearance of the cut surface of a lung showing the honeycomb pattern of end-stage pulmonary fibrosis.

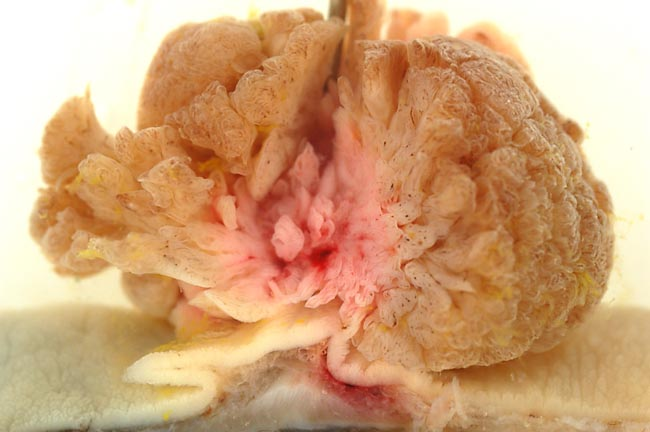
Gross examination: appearance of a colorectal polyp (the cauliflower-shaped tumor) attached to the colon mucosa (the horizontal line at the bottom).

Anatomical pathology (Commonwealth) or anatomic pathology (U.S.) is a medical specialty that is concerned with the diagnosis of disease based on the macroscopic, microscopic, biochemical, immunologic and molecular examination of organs and tissues. Over the 20th century, surgical pathology has evolved tremendously: from historical examination of whole bodies (autopsy) to a more modernized practice, centered on the diagnosis and prognosis of cancer to guide treatment decision-making in oncology. Its modern founder was the Italian scientist Giovanni Battista Morgagni from Forlì.

Anatomical pathology is one of two branches of pathology, the other being clinical pathology, the diagnosis of disease through the laboratory analysis of bodily fluids or tissues. Often, pathologists practice both anatomical and clinical pathology, a combination known as general pathology. Similar specialties exist in veterinary pathology.

== Differences with clinical pathology ==
Anatomic pathology relates to the processing, examination, and diagnosis of surgical specimens by a physician trained in pathological diagnosis. Clinical pathology involves the laboratory analysis of tissue samples and bodily fluids; procedures may include blood sample analysis, urinalysis, stool sample analysis, and analysis of spinal fluid. Clinical pathologists may specialize in a number of areas, including blood banking, clinical chemistry, microbiology, and hematology.

== Skills and procedures ==
The procedures used in anatomic pathology include:

- Gross examination – the examination of diseased tissues with the naked eye. This is important especially for large tissue fragments, because the disease can often be visually identified. It is also at this step that the pathologist selects areas that will be processed for histopathology. The eye can sometimes be aided with a magnifying glass or a stereo microscope, especially when examining parasitic organisms.
- Histopathology – the microscopic examination of stained tissue sections using histological techniques. The standard stains are haematoxylin and eosin, but many others exist. The use of haematoxylin and eosin-stained slides to provide specific diagnoses based on morphology is considered to be the core skill of anatomic pathology. The science of staining tissues sections is called histochemistry.
- Immunohistochemistry – the use of antibodies to detect the presence, abundance, and localization of specific proteins. This technique is critical to distinguishing between disorders with similar morphology, as well as characterizing the molecular properties of certain cancers.
- In situ hybridization – Specific DNA and RNA molecules can be identified on sections using this technique. When the probe is labeled with fluorescent dye, the technique is called FISH.
- Cytopathology – the examination of loose cells spread and stained on glass slides using cytology techniques
- Electron microscopy – the examination of tissue with an electron microscope, which allows much greater magnification, enabling the visualization of organelles within the cells. Its use has been largely supplanted by immunohistochemistry, but it is still in common use for certain tasks, including the diagnosis of kidney disease and the identification of immotile cilia syndrome.
- Tissue cytogenetics – the visualization of chromosomes to identify genetic defects such as chromosomal translocation
- Flow immunophenotyping – the determination of the immunophenotype of cells using flow cytometry techniques. It is very useful to diagnose the different types of leukemia and lymphoma.

== Subspecialties ==
=== Surgical pathology ===
Surgical pathology is the most significant and time-consuming area of practice for most anatomical pathologists. Surgical pathology involves the gross and microscopic examination of surgical specimens, as well as biopsies submitted by non-surgeons such as general internists, medical subspecialists, dermatologists, and interventional radiologists. Surgical pathology increasingly requires technologies and skills traditionally associated with clinical pathology such as molecular diagnostics.

=== Oral and maxillofacial pathology ===
In the United States, subspecialty-trained doctors of dentistry, rather than medical doctors, can be certified by a professional board to practice Oral and Maxillofacial Pathology.

=== Cytopathology ===
Cytopathology is a sub-discipline of anatomical pathology concerned with the microscopic examination of whole, individual cells obtained from exfoliation or fine-needle aspirates. Cytopathologists are trained to perform fine-needle aspirates of superficially located organs, masses, or cysts and are often able to render an immediate diagnosis in the presence of the patient and consulting physician. In the case of screening tests such as the Papanicolaou smear, non-physician cytotechnologists are often employed to perform initial reviews, with only positive or uncertain cases examined by the pathologist. Cytopathology is a board-certifiable subspecialty in the U.S.

=== Molecular pathology ===
Molecular pathology is an emerging discipline within anatomical and clinical pathology that is focused on the use of nucleic acid-based techniques such as in-situ hybridization, reverse-transcriptase polymerase chain reaction, and nucleic acid microarrays for specialized studies of disease in tissues and cells. Molecular pathology shares some aspects of practice with both anatomic and clinical pathology, and is sometimes considered a "crossover" discipline.

=== Forensic pathology ===
Forensic pathologists receive specialized training in determining the cause of death and other legally relevant information from the bodies of persons who died suddenly with no known medical condition, those who die from non-natural causes, as well as those dying as a result of homicide, or other criminally suspicious deaths. A majority of the forensic pathologists cases are due to natural causes. Often, additional tests such as toxicology, histology, and genetic testing will be used to help the pathologist determine the cause of death. Forensic pathologists will often testify in courts regarding their findings in cases of homicide and suspicious death. They also play a large role in public health, such as investigating deaths in the workplace, deaths in custody, as well as sudden and unexpected deaths in children. Forensic pathologists often have special areas of interest within their practice, such as sudden death due to cardiac pathology, deaths due to drugs, or Sudden Infant Death (SIDS), and various others.

== Training and certification ==
=== Australia ===
- (Also New Zealand, Hong Kong, Singapore, Malaysia, and Saudi Arabia)

Anatomical Pathology is one of the specialty training programs offered by the Royal College of Pathologists of Australasia (RCPA). The RCPA. To qualify as a Fellow of the RCPA in Anatomical Pathology, the candidate must complete a recognised undergraduate or postgraduate medical qualification and then complete a minimum of 2 years of clinical medical experience as a prerequisite to selection as a training registrar. The training program is a minimum of 5 years, served in at least two laboratories, and candidates must pass a Basic Pathological Sciences examination (usually in first year), the Part 1 examinations (not before third year) and the Part 2 examinations (not before fifth year). Fellows may then continue into subspecialty training.

=== Canada ===
Anatomical Pathology (AP) is one of the specialist certificates granted by the Royal College of Physicians and Surgeons of Canada. Other certificates related to pathology include general pathology (GP), hematopathology, and neuropathology. Candidates for any of these must have completed four years of medical school and five years of residency training.

=== United States ===
Anatomic pathology (AP) is one of the two primary certifications offered by the American Board of Pathology (the other is clinical pathology (CP)) and one of three primary certifications offered by the American Osteopathic Board of Pathology. To be certified in anatomic pathology, the trainee must complete four years of medical school followed by three years of residency training. Many U.S. pathologists are certified in both AP and CP, which requires a total of four years of residency. After completing residency, many pathologists enroll in further years of fellowship training to gain expertise in a subspecialty of AP or CP. Pathologists' Assistants are highly trained medical professionals with specialized training in Anatomic and Forensic pathology. To become a Pathologists' Assistant one must enter and successfully complete a NAACLS accredited program and pass the ASCP Board of Certification Exam.

== Practice settings ==
- Academic anatomical pathology is practiced at university medical centers by pathologists who are also university faculty. As such, they often have diverse responsibilities that may include training pathology residents, teaching medical students, conducting basic, clinical, or translational research, or performing administrative duties, all in addition to the practice of diagnostic anatomical pathology. Pathologists in academic settings often sub-specialize in a particular area of anatomic pathology and may serve as consultants to other pathologists regarding cases in their specific area of expertise.
- Group practice is the most traditional private practice model. In this arrangement, a group of senior pathologists will control a partnership that employs junior pathologists and contracts independently with hospitals to provide diagnostic services, as well as attracting referral business from local clinicians who practice in the outpatient setting. The group often owns a laboratory for histology and ancillary testing of tissue, and may hold contracts to run hospital-owned labs. Many pathologists who practice in this setting are trained and certified in both anatomical pathology and clinical pathology, which allows them to supervise blood banks, clinical chemistry laboratories, and medical microbiology laboratories as well.
- Large corporate providers of anatomical pathology services, such as AmeriPath in the United States. In this model, pathologists are employees, rather than independent partners. This model has been criticized for reducing physician independence, but defenders claim that the larger size of these practices allows for economies of scale and greater specialization, as well a sufficient volume to support more specialized testing methods.
- Multispecialty groups, composed of physicians from clinical specialties as well as radiology and pathology, are another practice model. In some case, these may be large groups controlled by an HMO or other large health care organization. In others, they are in essence clinician group practices that employ pathologists to provide diagnostic services for the group. These groups may own their own laboratories, or, in some cases may make controversial arrangements with "pod labs" that allow clinician groups to lease space, with the clinician groups receiving direct insurance payments for pathology services. Proposed changes to Medicare regulations may essentially eliminate these arrangements in the United States.

== See also ==
- Pathology
- Digital pathology and Telepathology
- Clinical pathology
- Forensic pathology
- Laser capture microdissection
- List of pathologists
- History of pathology
- United States and Canadian Academy of Pathology
