= Surgical pathology =

Area of practice for anatomical pathologists

Melanoma of the skin. This is as it would appear on the patient.

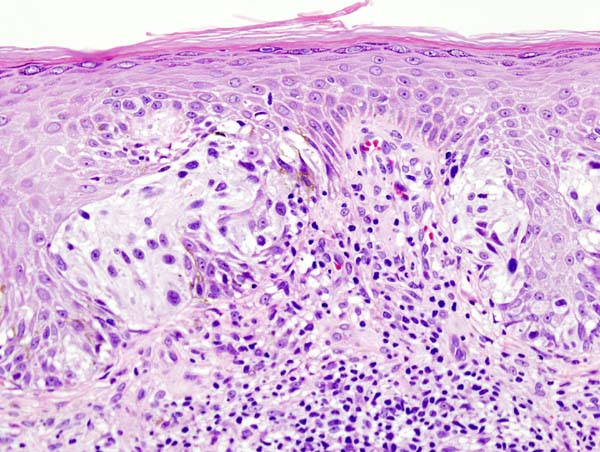
Melanoma of the skin. This is a section of tissue, stained with hematoxylin & eosin, and viewed on a microscope slide.

Surgical pathology is the significant and time-consuming area of practice for most anatomical pathologists. Surgical pathology involves gross and microscopic examination of surgical specimens, as well as biopsies submitted by surgeons and non-surgeons such as internal medicine specialists, clinical oncologists, medical subspecialists, dermatologists, and interventional radiologists.

The practice of surgical pathology allows for definitive diagnosis of disease (or lack thereof) in any case where tissue is surgically removed from a patient. This is usually performed by a combination of gross (i.e., macroscopic) and histologic (i.e., microscopic) examination of the tissue, and may involve evaluations of molecular properties of the tissue by immunohistochemistry or other laboratory tests.

The crucial information in the final histopathological report is the diagnosis of the subtype of the tumour (if present) as well as the evaluation of surgical margins, informing if the tumour was removed in total. Both, the diagnosis and surgical margins dictate further treatment.

== Specimens ==
There are two major types of specimens submitted for surgical pathology analysis: biopsies and surgical resections.

A biopsy is a small piece of tissue removed primarily for the purposes of surgical pathology analysis, most often in order to render a definitive diagnosis. Types of biopsies include core biopsies, which are obtained through the use of large-bore needles, sometimes under the guidance of radiological techniques such as ultrasound, CT scan, or magnetic resonance imaging. Core biopsies, which preserve tissue architecture, should not be confused with fine-needle aspiration specimens, which are analyzed using cytopathology techniques. Incisional biopsies are obtained through diagnostic surgical procedures that remove part of a suspicious lesion, whereas excisional biopsies remove the entire lesion and are similar to therapeutic surgical resections. Excisional biopsies of skin lesions and gastrointestinal polyps are very common. The pathologist's interpretation of a biopsy is critical to establishing the diagnosis of a benign or malignant tumor, and can differentiate between different types and grades of cancer, as well as determining the activity of specific molecular pathways in the tumor. This information is important for estimating the patient's prognosis and for choosing the best treatment to administer. Biopsies are also used to diagnose diseases other than cancer, including inflammatory, infectious, or idiopathic diseases of the skin and gastrointestinal tract, to name only a few.

Surgical resection specimens are obtained by the therapeutic surgical removal of an entire diseased area or organ (and occasionally multiple organs). These procedures are often intended as definitive surgical treatment of a disease in which the diagnosis is already known or strongly suspected. However, pathological analysis of these specimens is critically important in confirming the previous diagnosis, staging the extent of malignant disease, establishing whether or not the entire diseased area was removed (a process called "determination of the surgical margin", often using frozen section), identifying the presence of unsuspected concurrent diseases, and providing information for postoperative treatment, such as adjuvant chemotherapy in the case of cancer.

In the determination of surgical margin of a surgical resection, one can use the bread loafing technique, or CCPDMA. A special type of CCPDMA is named after a general surgeon, or the Mohs surgery method.

== Workflow ==
- Gross examination
- Frozen section
- Fixation & embedding
- Histopathologic examination
- Ancillary testing
- The surgical pathology report
- Direct consultation

== Subspecialties ==
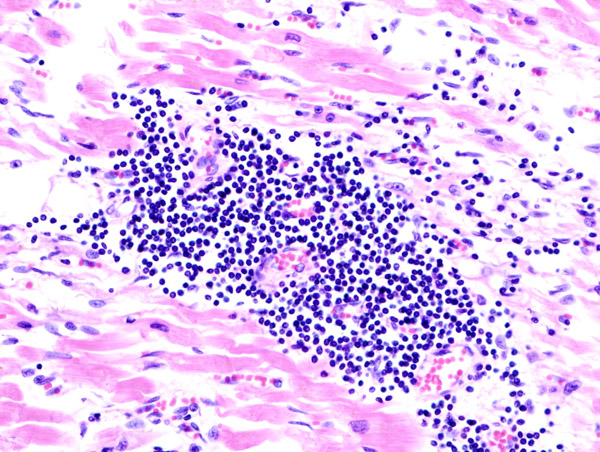
Histologic slide demonstrating viral myocarditis, an infection of the heart muscle

Many pathologists seek fellowship-level training, or otherwise pursue expertise in a focused area of surgical pathology. Subspecialization is particularly prevalent in the academic setting, where pathologists may specialise in an area of diagnostic surgical pathology that is relevant to their research, but is becoming increasingly prevalent in private practice as well. Subspecialization has a number of benefits, such as allowing for increased experience and skill at interpreting challenging cases, as well as development of a closer working relationship between the pathologist and clinicians within a subspecialty area. Commonly recognized subspecialties of surgical pathology include the following:

- Bone pathology
- Cardiac pathology
- Cytopathology (A board-certifiable subspecialty in the U.S.)
- Dermatopathology (A board-certifiable subspecialty in the U.S.)
- Endocrine pathology
- Gastrointestinal pathology
- Genitourinary pathology
- Gynecologic pathology
- Head and neck pathology
- Hematopathology (A board-certifiable subspecialty in the U.S.)
- Neuropathology (A board-certifiable subspecialty in the U.S. and a recognised specialty in the U.K.)
- Ophthalmic pathology
- Pediatric pathology (A board-certifiable subspecialty in the U.S. and a recognised specialty in the U.K.)
- Pulmonary pathology
- Renal pathology
- Soft tissue pathology
- Breast pathology

== See also ==
- Anatomical pathology
- Digital pathology and Telepathology
- List of pathologists
- History of pathology
- United States and Canadian Academy of Pathology

== Bibliography ==
- Richard Cote, Saul Suster, Lawrence Weiss, Noel Weidner (2003). Modern Surgical Pathology (2 Volume Set). London: W B Saunders. ISBN 0-7216-7253-1.
