= International Academy of Pathology =

The International Academy of Pathology, originally called the International Association of Medical Museums (IAMM), is an institution dedicated "to the advancement of Pathology". In 1906, it was established by Dr. William Osler and Maude Abbott.

Its first documented meeting occurred on May 6, 1907.

In 1955, the IAMM was renamed as the International Academy of Pathology (IAP).
