= United States and Canadian Academy of Pathology =

The United States and Canadian Academy of Pathology
- Formation: 1906
- Type: professional association
- Headquarters: Palm Springs, CA
- Official language: English

The United States and Canadian Academy of Pathology, abbreviated USCAP, is the largest North American organization of pathologists. It is the publisher to two major pathology journals, Laboratory Investigation and Modern Pathology.
