= Barbara J. Bain =

Australian haematologist

- Born: Barbara Jane Reid; July 27, 1941 (age 85)
- Known for: Contributions to field of haematology
- Title: Professor

Academic background
- Education: University of Queensland

Academic work
- Discipline: Medicine
- Sub-discipline: Haematology, Oncology
- Institutions: Imperial College Faculty of Medicine; St Mary's Hospital, London

Barbara Jane Bain AM (born 1941) is an Australian haematologist and oncologist. She is a professor at the Imperial College Faculty of Medicine and a consultant at St Mary's Hospital, London. She is known as the author of reference textbooks in the field of haematology that form the core curriculum for laboratory morphology and pathology.

== Early life and education ==
Bain grew up in Australia and was educated in Maryborough, Queensland. She completed her undergraduate studies at the University of Queensland, where she was awarded the University Gold Medal. She was a registrar at the Princess Alexandra Hospital. She traveled to England in late 1971, supported by a scholarship from the Royal Australasian College of Physicians. She said that she wanted to work in haematology due to a combination of laboratory and clinical work.

== Research and career ==
In 1972, Bain joined St Mary's Hospital as a lecturer, where she was made a reader in 2000 and professor in 2004. She is an expert in haematology and the translation of laboratory breakthroughs to clinical science. For example, she investigated myelodysplastic syndrome, which can evolve into acute myeloid leukaemia and dysplastic haemopoiesis without proper diagnosis and treatment.

At St Mary's, Bain developed a training program on haematology, covering topics such as the analysis of blood and bone marrow samples and genetic disorders that affect haemoglobin. She helped to develop bloodmed.com, an online educational course that is taken by almost all UK trainees. The course was incorporated to the British Society for Haematology website. She was part of the International Working Group on Morphology of MDS and also in the group which devised the 2008 WHO classification of tumours of the lymphoid haematopoietic systems. She has translated two editions of an Italian work on the morphology of the blood. In 2019, the Queensland University of Technology announced the Barbara Bain prize for Haematology.

== Awards and honours ==
- 2017 Maryborough Walk of Achievers
- 2017 British Society for Haematology Lifetime Achievement Award
- 2018 European Hematology Association Mentoring and Teaching Award
- 2020 Queen's Birthday Honours

== Selected publications ==
=== Articles ===
- Bain, Barbara J. (1996). "Ethnic and sex differences in the total and differential white cell count and platelet count". Journal of Clinical Pathology. 49 (8): 664–666. doi:10.1136/jcp.49.8.664. PMC 500612. PMID 8881919. Wikidata Q37220258.
- Bain, Barbara J. (2005). "Diagnosis from the blood smear". The New England Journal of Medicine. 353 (5): 498–507. doi:10.1056/nejmra043442. PMID 16079373. Wikidata Q33367656.
- Kate Ryan; Bain, Barbara J.; David Worthington; et al. (2010). "Significant haemoglobinopathies: guidelines for screening and diagnosis". British Journal of Haematology. 149 (1): 35–49. doi:10.1111/j.1365-2141.2009.08054.x. PMID 20067565. Wikidata Q82476547.

=== Books ===
- Bain, Barbara J. (2019). Bone marrow pathology. Wiley. ISBN 9781119398127.
- Bain, Barbara J. (2020). Haemoglobinopathy Diagnosis. Wiley. ISBN 9781119579991.
- Bain, Barbara J. (2021). Blood Cells A Practical Guide. Wiley. ISBN 9781119820291.
