= Adele Fielding =

British physician

Adele Kay Fielding
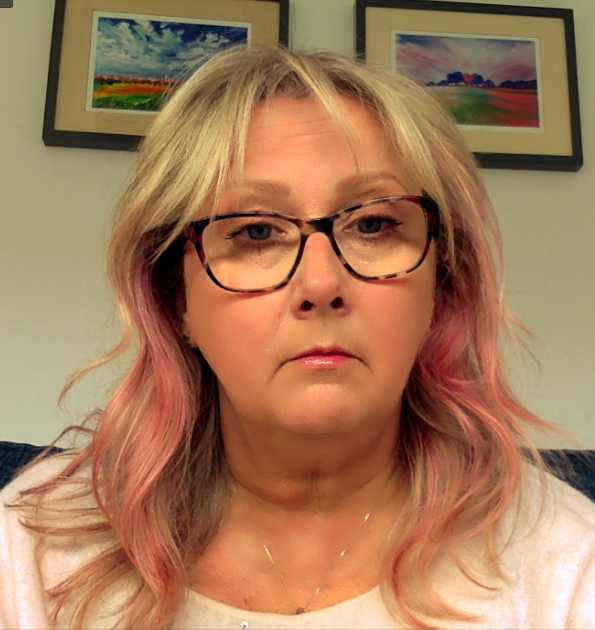
- Education: University of London; University College London
- Scientific career
- Workplaces: Mayo Clinic; Royal Free Hospital; University College London Hospitals NHS Foundation Trust; University College London; University of York; Hull York Medical School
- Thesis: Targeting fusogenic retroviral glycoproteins by ligand display. (1999)

Adele Kay Fielding is a British physician-scientist who is a Professor of Haematology at University College London. Fielding was President of the British Society for Haematology from 2020 until 2022.

== Early life and education ==
Fielding was a medical student at University College London. She was a trainee in haematology (the medical specialty covering blood disorders including cancer) and general medicine in London. She moved to the Medical Research Council laboratory in Cambridge for her doctoral research, and completed her doctorate in 1999.

== Research and career ==
In 1999, Fielding was appointed assistant professor at the Mayo Clinic. She returned to the United Kingdom in 2003, where she joined University College London, becoming Professor of Haematology, and the Royal Free Hospital for clinical practice. She moved clinical practice to University College London Hospitals NHS Foundation Trust in 2015, where she worked in the leukemia service. In 2023, she moved to the University of York, where she is a Professor of Haematology and Head of Experimental Biomedicine at the Hull York Medical School. She is also the Clinical Director of the University of York Centre for Blood Research. She currently sees patients at the Queens Centre, Castle Hill Hospital, Hull.

Her research efforts look to improve the lives of people with acute lymphoblastic leukemia (ALL). She is part of several clinical trials into ALL, which include studying the underlying mechanisms and searching for new treatments. Fielding has developed an attenuated oncolytic measles virus that can be used as a treatment of ALL.

Fielding was elected President of the British Society for Haematology in 2020 and was succeeded in 2022 by Josh Wright.

== Selected publications ==
- Hagop Kantarjian; Anthony Stein; Adele K Fielding; et al. (2017). "Blinatumomab versus Chemotherapy for Advanced Acute Lymphoblastic Leukemia". The New England Journal of Medicine. 376 (9): 836–847. doi:10.1056/nejmoa1609783. PMC 5881572. PMID 28249141. Wikidata Q40312849.
- Adele K Fielding; Susan M Richards; Rajesh Chopra; et al. (2006). "Outcome of 609 adults after relapse of acute lymphoblastic leukemia (ALL); an MRC UKALL12/ECOG 2993 study". Blood. 109 (3): 944–950. doi:10.1182/blood-2006-05-018192. PMID 17032921. Wikidata Q43889424.
- Max S Topp; Nicola Gökbuget; Anthony S Stein; et al. (2014). "Safety and activity of blinatumomab for adult patients with relapsed or refractory B-precursor acute lymphoblastic leukaemia: a multicentre, single-arm, phase 2 study". The Lancet Oncology. 16 (1): 57–66. doi:10.1016/s1470-2045(14)71170-2. PMID 25524800. Wikidata Q34042800.
- Burt, R; Dey, A; Aref, S; Aguiar, M; Akarca, A; Bailey, K; Day, W; Hooper, S; Kirkwood, A; Kirschner, K; Lee, SW; Lo Celso, C; Manji, J; Mansour, MR; Marafioti, T; Mitchell, RJ; Muirhead, RC; Cheuk Yan, Ng K; Pospori, C; Puccio, I; Zuborne-Alapi, K; Sahai, E; Fielding, AK (2019). "Activated stromal cells transfer mitochondria to rescue acute lymphoblastic leukemia cells from oxidative stress". Blood. 134 (17): 1415–1429. doi:10.1182/blood.2019001398. PMC 6856969. PMID 31501154.
- Marks, David I; Kirkwood, Amy A; Rowntree, Clare J; Aguiar, Melanie; Bailey, Katharine E; Beaton, Brendan; Cahalin, Paul; Castleton, Anna Z; Clifton-Hadley, Laura; Copland, Mhairi; Goldstone, Anthony H; Kelly, Richard; Lawrie, Emma; Lee, SooWah; McMillan, Andrew K (April 2022). "Addition of four doses of rituximab to standard induction chemotherapy in adult patients with precursor B-cell acute lymphoblastic leukaemia (UKALL14): a phase 3, multicentre, randomised controlled trial". The Lancet Haematology. 9 (4): e262–e275. doi:10.1016/S2352-3026(22)00038-2. PMC 8969057. PMID 35358441. S2CID 247803678.
- Marks, DI; Kirkwood, AA; Rowntree, CJ; Aguiar, M; Bailey, KE; Beaton, B; Cahalin, P; Castleton, AZ; Clifton-Hadley, L; Copland, M; Goldstone, AH; Kelly, R; Lawrie, E; Lee, S; McMillan, AK; McMullin, MF; Menne, TF; Mitchell, RJ; Moorman, AV; Patel, B; Patrick, P; Smith, P; Taussig, D; Yallop, D; Alapi, KZ; Fielding, AK (2022). "Addition of four doses of rituximab to standard induction chemotherapy in adult patients with precursor B-cell acute lymphoblastic leukaemia (UKALL14): a phase 3, multicentre, randomised controlled trial". Lancet Haematol. 9: e262–e275. doi:10.1016/S2352-3026(22)00038-2. PMC 8969057. PMID 35358441.
