= Michael Osborn (pathologist) =

British pathologist

Michael Osborn FRCPath
- Known for: President of the Royal College of Pathologists
- Scientific career
- Fields: Pathology
- Workplaces: Imperial College Healthcare NHS Trust

Michael Osborn is a British pathologist who was the president of the Royal College of Pathologists from November 2020 to November 2023 He received his medical degree from Guy's & St Thomas' Hospitals in London in 1995. In 2000, he became a member of the Royal College of Surgeons, and in 2004, he was named a Fellow of the Royal College of Pathologists. He was hired as a consultant in 2004 with a focus on postmortems, gastrointestinal pathology, and instructing undergraduate students. He is the department head at Imperial College Healthcare NHS Trust in London and a consultant histopathologist for North West London Pathology. He contributed to the COVID-19 postmortem site for the college and wrote many guide materials.

== Select publications ==
- Brian P Hanley; Sebastian B Lucas; Esther Youd; Benjamin Swift; Michael Osborn (20 March 2020). "Autopsy in suspected COVID-19 cases". Journal of Clinical Pathology. doi:10.1136/jclinpath-2020-206522. ISSN 0021-9746. PMID 32198191. S2CID 214600455. Wikidata Q90539057.
- Brian Hanley; Kikkeri N Naresh; Candice Roufosse; et al. (20 August 2020). "Histopathological findings and viral tropism in UK patients with severe fatal COVID-19: a post-mortem study". The Lancet Microbe. doi:10.1016/s2666-5247(20)30115-4. ISSN 2666-5247. PMC 7440861. PMID 32844161. Wikidata Q98727210.

Educational offices
Preceded by Jo Martin	President of the Royal College of Pathologists; 2020 – 2023	Succeeded by Bernie Croal
