= Rosemary Biggs =

Haematologist and botanist

- Born: 21 April 1912; London, England
- Died: 29 June 2001 (aged 89)
- Education: University of Toronto; London School of Medicine for Women
- Medical career
- Field: Hematology

Rosemary Peyton Biggs (21 April 1912 – 29 June 2001) was an English haematologist. She worked closely with Robert Gwyn Macfarlane at the Radcliffe Infirmary and Churchill Hospital in Oxford, where she studied coagulation disorders, particularly haemophilia.

== Early life and education ==
Rosemary Biggs was born on 21 April 1912 in London to Edgar Biggs, a goldsmith, and his wife Ethel. Rosemary wished to study medicine but her parents did not approve of her choice, so as a compromise she studied botany, receiving a BSc from the University of London in 1934 and later a PhD in mycology from the University of Toronto. With the beginning of World War II, she returned to London and enrolled at the London School of Medicine for Women; she graduated with an MBBS in 1943.

== Career ==
In 1944, after holding junior posts in London hospitals, Biggs moved to Oxford, where she joined the Radcliffe Infirmary's pathology department as a graduate assistant. She initially studied crush syndrome and the variability in haematological tests, under the mentorship of Robert Gwyn Macfarlane. She then researched the formation and breakdown of blood clots (coagulation and fibrinolysis), and earned an MD and a gold medal from the University of London with her thesis on the clotting enzyme prothrombin in 1949. In 1952, she designed a new test, the thromboplastin generation test, for detecting defects in the blood of people with haemophilia. The same year, Biggs and Macfarlane's group discovered a previously unknown clotting enzyme, factor IX, which they originally named Christmas factor. They also coined the term Christmas disease (now known as haemophilia B) for patients with factor IX deficiencies, as distinguished from classical haemophilia (now known as haemophilia A), wherein there is a deficiency in factor VIII. The new factor and disease were named after Stephen Christmas, the first patient discovered by the group at Oxford to be deficient in factor IX.

Biggs and Macfarlane published the textbook Human Blood Coagulation and its Disorders in 1953 and wrote the first UK guidelines for treating haemophilia in 1955. Their proposal for a national haemophilia centre that housed departments for treatment, research and blood plasma fractionation, was approved by the Department of Health in 1964; at the time, three-quarters of all known patients in England and Wales with severe haemophilia were treated at Oxford. Upon Macfarlane's retirement in 1967, Biggs was placed in charge of the Medical Research Council's Blood Coagulation Research Laboratory in Oxford. The Oxford Haemophilia Centre was opened in 1968 at the Churchill Hospital, and it was directed by Biggs from its foundation until her retirement in 1977.

Biggs received the James F. Mitchell Foundation International Award for Heart and Vascular Research in 1971 and the Haemophilia Society's Macfarlane Award in 1978. She was elected Fellow of the Royal College of Physicians in 1974. She was a founding member of the British Society for Haematology and the International Society on Thrombosis and Haemostasis, and served as editor of the British Journal of Haematology and the Journal of Thrombosis and Haemostasis.

== Later life ==
Biggs retired in 1977 and thereafter lived in Little Comberton, Worcestershire, with her adopted daughter. She died on 29 June 2001.
