= List of honorary fellows of Christ's College, Cambridge =

This is a list of Honorary Fellows of Christ's College, Cambridge. A list of current honorary fellows is published in the Cambridge University Reporter, Special No. 3, 2008.

- Bernard Bailyn
- John Ball
- Sir Rodric Braithwaite
- Sir David Cannadine
- Sir Anthony Caro
- John Clarke
- Dame Linda Colley
- Sir Jim Cuthbert Smith
- Sir Alan Cottrell
- Sir Michael Edwards
- Sir Martin Evans
- Chris Frith
- John Gregg
- Duncan Haldane
- Yusuf Hamied
- Sir Peter Hirsch
- Anthony R. Hunter
- Hugh Huxley
- Derry Irvine, Baron Irvine of Lairg
- Philip Kitcher
- Phillip King
- Richard Luce, Baron Luce
- Tanya Luhrmann
- Mike Lynch
- Sir John Lyons
- Neil McKendrick
- James Meade
- Sir Martin Moore-Bick
- Louis Mountbatten, 1st Earl Mountbatten of Burma
- Sir Robin Nicholson
- Sir Keith Peters
- Sir Hugh Pelham
- Prince Zeid bin Ra'ad
- Sir Christopher Ricks
- Sir Charles Saumarez Smith
- Sir Simon Schama
- Sir Nicholas Serota
- Quentin Skinner
- Margaret Stanley
- Barry Supple
- Sir Jeffrey Tate
- Andrew Turnbull, Baron Turnbull
- Sir Dillwyn Williams
- Rowan Williams, Baron Williams of Oystermouth
- Sir Oliver Wright
- George Yeo
- Yeo Ning Hong
- Sir Christopher Zeeman
