= Alan Glynn (bacteriologist) =

British physician and bacteriologist

Professor Alan Glynn FRCP FRCPath
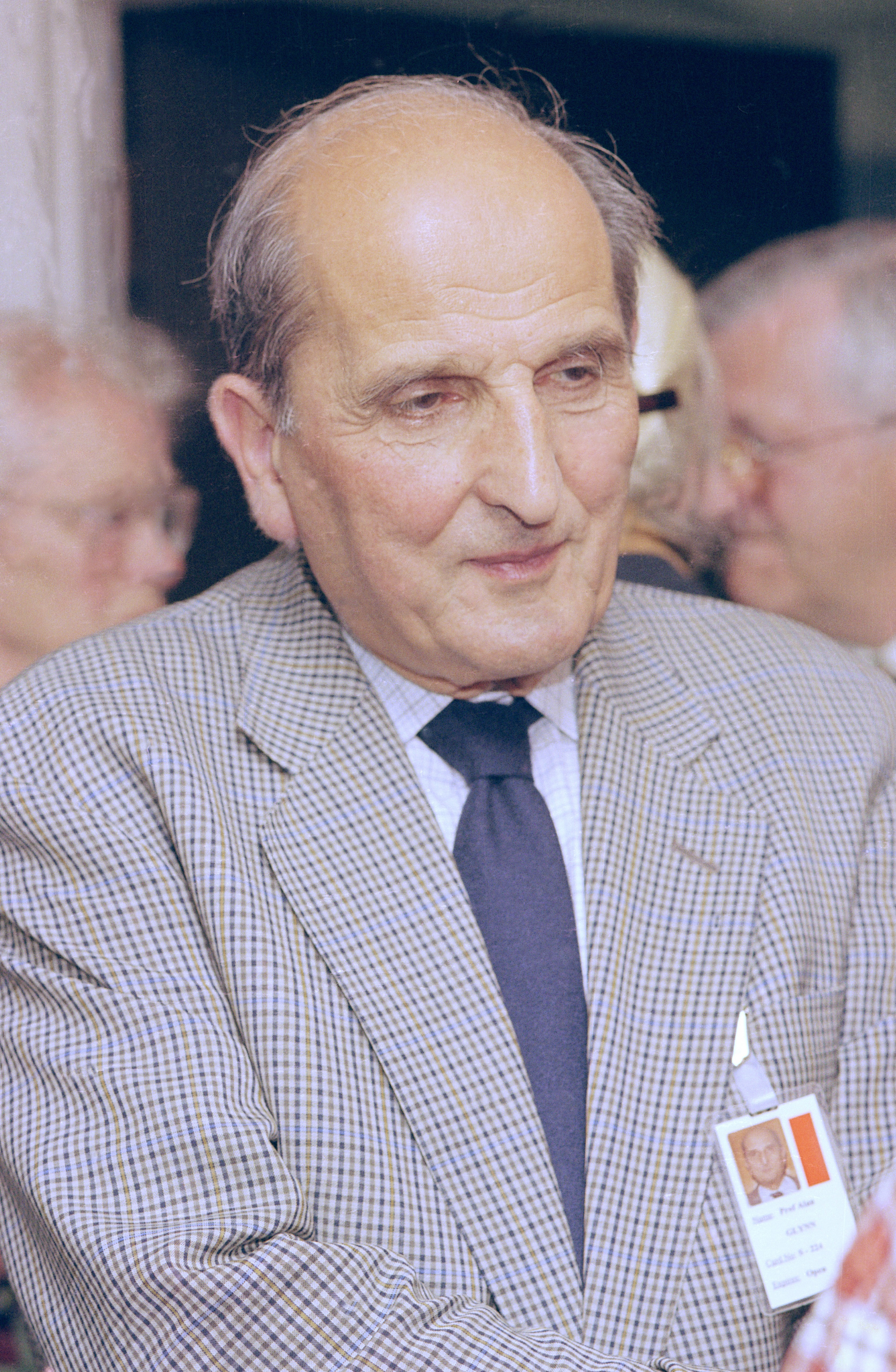
- Glynn in June 1998
- Born: 9 May 1923; Hackney, London, England
- Died: 2 April 2014 (aged 90)
- Occupations: Physician; Bacteriologist

Alan Glynn (1923-2014) was a British physician and bacteriologist.

Glynn was born in Hackney, London, on 9 May 1923, the son of Charlotte, née Fluxbaum, and Hyman Glynn, an accountant. His Jewish parents had arrived in London from Poland/ Russia as children in the 1890s.

He underwent National Service in the Royal Army Medical Corps from 1950, being stationed in occupied Hamburg, with the rank of captain.

From 1956 to 1958 he undertook clinical practise at St Mary's Hospital, London. While there he became interested in bacteriology, eventually being made a professor in 1971 and head of the Department of Bacteriology in 1974.

He was director of the Central Public Health Laboratory from 1980 to 1988, when he retired.

He was elected a Fellow of the Royal College of Physicians (FRCP) and a Fellow of the Royal College of Pathologists (FRCPath).

He died on 2 April 2014.
