= William Cline =

Bill or William Cline may refer to:

- Milton William Cline (1825–1911), American sailor, soldier, scout and pioneer
- William Cline Borden (1858–1934), American surgeon and key planner of Walter Reed Army Medical Center
- William Cline (cinematographer) (1903–1976), American film and TV director of photography, a/k/a Wilfrid M. Cline
- William A. Cline (1910–2012), American defense attorney in 1944 Court-Martial of Jackie Robinson
- William C. Cline, American film historian during 1960s–1990s specializing in serials (King of the Rocket Men)
- William R. Cline (born 1941), American economist, Senior Fellow at Peterson Institute for International Economics
- Bill Cline (born 1943), Canadian football player

== See also ==
- William G. Kline (1882—after 1942), American football, baseball and basketball coach
- William Klyne (1913–1977), English organic chemist and academic, a/k/a Bill Klyne
- William Klein (disambiguation)
