= British Society for Haematology =

The British Society for Haematology
- Established: 1960
- President: Sue Pavord
- Website: b-s-h.org.uk

The British Society for Haematology is a registered charity founded in 1960 for professionals specialising in haematology, the medical specialism covering blood disorders including cancers. Apart from representing the interests of its members, it publishes the British Journal of Haematology and the open-access journal EJHaem, and issues guidelines on haematological conditions.

== Membership ==
Full membership to the society is open to all but usually consists of senior haematology professionals, including consultants, senior lecturers, senior scientists, and allied health professionals at band 8b and above. Full membership also requires the payment of an annual membership fee.

A reduced fee full membership is also available for established haematology professionals, including Specialty Trainees, Academic Clinical Fellows, residents of Low-and-Middle-Income Countries, Specialty Doctors, Post-doctoral researchers and scientists and Allied Health Professionals of bands 8a.

Associate membership is available for undergraduate and full-time post-graduate students, foundation doctors, core trainees, IM trainees, STP trainees, nurses and allied health professionals up to and including Band 7. It is also available for retired professionals that wish to access the British Journal of Haematology or vote in Society elections.

== The British Journal of Haematology ==
The British Journal of Haematology (BJH) is the official journal of the British Society for Haematology. The BJH is a peer-reviewed medical journal that has been in publication since 1955. The Journal publishes original research papers in clinical, laboratory and experimental haematology, helping clinicians and staff in the field keep up to date with the latest recommendations, developments, and protocols.

== EJHaem ==
The BSH has launched an open access journal, EJHaem, with Professor Andrew M Evens appointed as Editor-in-chief. This is the society's second official journal and is co-owned and published by Wiley. This Gold Open Access journal aims to provide an additional home for those wishing to publish haematology research on an Open Access basis. The EJHaem accepts direct submissions, as well as content cascaded from the British Journal of Haematology.

== Guidelines ==
The British Society for Haematology produces its guidelines. These guidelines are written by expert consultants and clinical scientists currently practising in the UK. The guidelines provide up-to-date evidence-based guidance on the diagnosis and treatment of haematological diseases.

They provide three different styles of guidelines:

BSH Guideline: Evidence-based guidelines developed following a professional literature search and a review of the evidence by the writing group.

BSH Good Practice Paper: Used to recommend good practice in areas where there is a less robust evidence base but for which a degree of consensus or uniformity is likely to be beneficial to patient care.

BSH Position Paper: The adoption and adaptation of a non-UK evidence-based guideline for use in the UK.

== BSH Events ==
Annual Scientific Meeting

Every year the BSH holds an annual scientific meeting (ASM) at different locations within the United Kingdom. The 2026 ASM will be held at the ACC in Liverpool on 19- 21 April 2026. The meetings host internationally renowned expert speakers, a range of sessions discussing specialist topics, and innovative debates. In addition to this, there is a call for abstracts from haematology professionals in which they apply to present their research at the meeting.

Other Events

The BSH also frequently hosts a variety of both online and in person events. These courses and events are organized for special interest groups and trainee haematology students and professionals. They permit the professional development of attendees and also provide a platform for discussion and networking opportunities.

BSH Grants

The BSH provides grants to support hundreds of haematology professionals to attend international conferences, undertake research and advance haematology education. There are grants provided for members only – open to members after one year of membership. These grants include meeting support grants, cohort study grants (open to members with three years of membership), early-stage research start-up grants and visiting fellow grants.

Other grants are open to all. These grants include Undergraduate support, ASM Travel Scholarships, and some Global Haematology Scholarships.

== List of presidents ==
President	Term
L.J. Witts	1960–61
L.J. Witts	1961–62
J.F. Wilkinson	1962–63
R.H Girdwood	1963–64
J.V. Dacie	1964–65
E.K Blackburn	1965–66
R. Bodley Scott	1966–67
W.d’A Maycock	1967–68
R.B Thompson	1968–69
M.G. Nelson	1969–70
F.G.H Hayhoe	1970–71
R.R. Race	1971–72
J.O.P Edgcumbe	1972–73
A.S. Douglas	1973–74
A.Jacobs	1974–75
H. Lehmann	1975–76
G. McDonald	1976–77
P.L. Mollison	1977–78
G.H. Tovey	1978–79
J.W Stewart	1979–80
D.J. Weatherall	1980–81
H.T Swan	1981–82
R.M Hardisty	1982–83
S.M. Lewis	1983–84
N.K. Shinton	1984–85
P.T. Flute	1985–86
J.E. MacIver	1986–87
A.L. Bloom	1987–88
G.C. Jenkins	1988–89
A.V. Hoffbrand	1989–90
J.F. Davidson	1990–91
A.J. Bellingham	1991–92
A.H. Waters	1992–93
B.E. Roberts	1993–94
E.C. Gordon-Smith	1994–95
F.E. Preston	1995–96
D. Catovsky	1996–97
A.K. Burnett	1997–98
A.C. Newland	1998–99
Isobel D.Walker	1999–2000
A.H. Goldstone	2000–01
M. Greaves	2001–02
M. Greaves	2002–03
A.G. Prentice	2003–04
A.G. Prentice	2004–05
S. J. Machin	2005–06
S. J. Machin	2006–07
Brenda E S Gibson	2007–08
Brenda E S Gibson	2008–09
D. C. Linch	2009–10
F.E Cotter	2010–11
S.E Schey	2011–12
Angela E. Thomas	2012–13
G.H Jackson	2013–14
T.P. Baglin	2014–15
P.A. Carrington	2015–16
T.J Littlewood	2016–17
C.F. Craddock	2017–18
Cheng-Hock Toh	2018–20
Adele Fielding	2020–2022
Josh Wright	2022-2024
Sue Pavord	2024-2026
