= Johnson M. Liu =

Johnson M. Liu is an American hematologist and academic physician. He specializes in molecular hematopoiesis, bone marrow failure syndromes, and gene therapy for genetic blood disorders. He is Professor of Medicine and Section Head for Hematology within the Division of Hematology and Medical Oncology at the Icahn School of Medicine at Mount Sinai, New York City, where he is also affiliated with the Tisch Cancer Center.

He is a Fellow of American College of Physicians.

== Early life and education ==
Liu received his Bachelor of Science in Biology from the University of Michigan, Ann Arbor, in 1982. He earned his Doctor of Medicine from the University of Michigan in 1986.

== Career ==
Liu joined the National Heart, Lung, and Blood Institute (NHLBI) at the National Institutes of Health (NIH) in Bethesda, Maryland, as a Medical Staff Fellow from 1988 to 1991 and a Hematology Fellow from 1991 to 1992.

In 2022, Liu was appointed Professor of Medicine and Section Head of Hematology in the Department of Medicine at the Icahn School of Medicine at Mount Sinai, Tisch Cancer Center.

== Research ==
Liu's early research focused on Fanconi anemia (FA). He contributed to studies using adeno-associated virus (AAV) vectors for gene transfer in hematopoietic stem cells and served as principal investigator of a 1999 clinical trial of gene therapy for FA patients.

Liu's research examined the molecular mechanisms of acute myeloid leukemia, including studies of the t(8;21) fusion protein and its interaction with chromatin-associated corepressor complexes. His work contributed to understanding the role of transcriptional regulation in leukemia.

Liu's laboratory has studied the role of defective ribosome biogenesis in disorders including Diamond–Blackfan anemia (DBA), Shwachman–Diamond syndrome (SDS), and 5q− myelodysplastic syndrome. His research has examined the relationship between these ribosomopathies and abnormalities in hematopoiesis.

== Selected publications ==
Liu has authored or co-authored over 120 peer-reviewed articles, monographs, and book chapters. His work has been cited more than 7,900 times (Google Scholar h-index: 41; i10-index: 84, as of June 2026).

- Walsh CE, Liu JM, et al. "Phenotypic correction of Fanconi anemia in human hematopoietic cells with a recombinant adeno-associated virus vector." Journal of Clinical Investigation, 1994.
- Wang J, Hoshino T, Redner RL, Kajigaya S, Liu JM. "ETO, fusion partner in t(8;21) acute myeloid leukemia, represses transcription by interaction with the human N-CoR/mSin3/HDAC1 complex." Proceedings of the National Academy of Sciences USA, 1998.
- Liu JM, Kim S, Read EJ, et al. "Engraftment of hematopoietic progenitor cells transduced with the Fanconi anemia group C gene (FANCC)." Human Gene Therapy, 1999.
- Liu JM, Ellis SR. "Ribosomes and marrow failure: coincidental association or molecular paradigm?" Blood, 2006.
- Vlachos A, Ball S, Dahl N, et al. (including Liu JM). "Diagnosing and treating Diamond Blackfan anemia: results of an international clinical consensus conference." British Journal of Haematology, 2008.
- Wlodarski M, et al. (including Liu JM). "Diagnosis, treatment, and surveillance of Diamond-Blackfan anaemia syndrome: international consensus statement." Lancet Haematology, 2024.

== Honors and awards ==
- 1980 Regents-Alumni Award; Horace Rackham Scholar, University of Michigan
- 1981 William J. Branstrom Prize, University of Michigan
- 1982 James B. Angell Scholar, University of Michigan
- 1988 House Officer/Hospital Staff Excellence Award, Medical University of South Carolina
- 1996 Fellow, American College of Physicians
- 2001 Commendation Medal, U.S. Public Health Service
