= Claire McLintock =

Haematologist and obstetric physician (1965–2022)

Claire McLintock ONZM
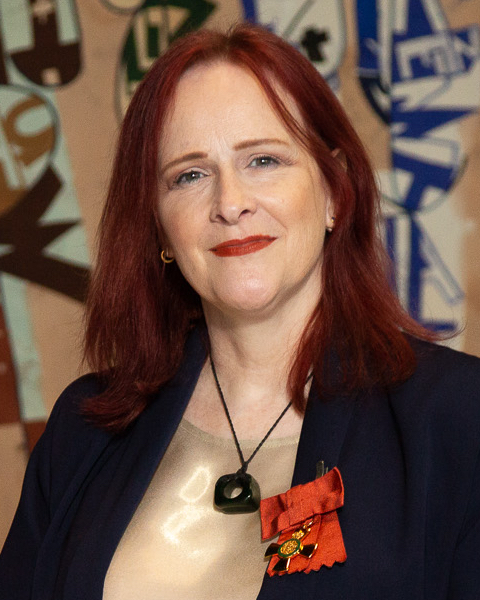
- McLintock in 2019
- Born: Marie Claire McLintock; 1965; Dundee, Scotland
- Died: 23 December 2022 (aged 57); Auckland, New Zealand
- Education: University of Edinburgh
- Spouse: John Reynolds
- Children: 2
- Scientific career
- Fields: Haematology; obstetrics
- Workplaces: Auckland City Hospital

Marie Claire McLintock ONZM (1965 – 23 December 2022) was a New Zealand haematologist and obstetric physician. She was an expert in medical conditions and disorders related to bleeding and blood clotting, and medical problems associated with pregnancy.

== Early life and education ==
McLintock was born in Dundee, Scotland, the daughter of Iain and Margaret McLintock. Her father was a chemist at the University of Dundee and her mother was a teacher of mathematics, and she wanted to become a medical doctor from an early age. She completed her medical degree at the University of Edinburgh in 1989, and then undertook postgraduate studies in haematology in Auckland, New Zealand.

== Career ==
McLintock was a clinical director of regional maternity services at Auckland City Hospital, and later a haematologist and obstetric physician at National Women's Health. She became a Fellow of the Royal Australasian College of Physicians in 2000 and a Fellow of the Royal College of Pathologists of Australasia in 2001. She was an honorary senior lecturer with the Faculty of Medical and Health Sciences of the University of Auckland.

McLintock served in multiple leadership roles with the International Society on Thrombosis and Haemostasis: as president (2018–2020), chair of the Education Committee, co-chair of the Scientific and Standardization Committee's Subcommittee on Women's Health Issues on Thrombosis and Hemostasis, executive member of the local organizing committee for the ISTH 2019 Congress, and the vice-chair of World Thrombosis Day steering committee. She also served as a council member (2004–2007) and president (2007–2009) of the Society of Obstetric Medicine of Australia and New Zealand, as president of the Thrombosis and Haemostasis Society of Australia and New Zealand (2009-2011), and on the editorial board of the Internal Medicine Journal and Journal of Thrombosis and Haemostasis. She was appointed an Officer of the New Zealand Order of Merit in the 2019 Queen's Birthday Honours, for services to haematology and obstetrics.

== Personal life and death ==
McLintock was married to John Reynolds, a New Zealand artist, and the couple had two children. She was first diagnosed with breast cancer in 2003, and the cancer returned in 2017, spreading to her abdomen. She died in Auckland on 23 December 2022, aged 57.

== Selected publications ==
- Bethany Samuelson Bannow; Claire McLintock; Paula James (2021) "Menstruation, anticoagulation, and contraception: VTE and uterine bleeding". Research and Practice in Thrombosis and Haemostasis 5 (5): e12570.
- Flora Peyvandi; David Lillicrap; Johnny Mahlangu; Claire McLintock; K. John Pasi; Steven W. Pipe; Wendy Scales; Alok Srivastava; Thierry VandenDriessche (2020) "Hemophilia gene therapy knowledge and perceptions: Results of an international survey". Research and Practice in Thrombosis and Haemostasis 4 (4): 644–651.
- Behnood Bikdeli; Mahesh V. Madhavan; David Jimenez; Taylor Chuich; Isaac Dreyfus; Elissa Driggin; Caroline Der Nigoghossian; Walter Ageno; Mohammad Madjid; Yutao Guo; Liang V. Tang; Yu Hu; Jay Giri; Mary Cushman; Isabelle Quéré; Evangelos P. Dimakakos; C. Michael Gibson; Giuseppe Lippi; Emmanuel J. Favaloro; Jawed Fareed; Joseph A. Caprini; Alfonso J. Tafur; John R. Burton; Dominic P. Francese; Elizabeth Y. Wang; Anna Falanga; Claire McLintock; Beverley J. Hunt; Alex C. Spyropoulos; Geoffrey D. Barnes; John W. Eikelboom; Ido Weinberg; Sam Schulman; Marc Carrier; Gregory Piazza; Joshua A. Beckman; P. Gabriel Steg; Gregg W. Stone; Stephan Rosenkranz; Samuel Z. Goldhaber; Sahil A. Parikh; Manuel Monreal; Harlan M. Krumholz; Stavros V. Konstantinides; Jeffrey I. Weitz; Gregory Y.H. Lip (2020) "COVID-19 and Thrombotic or Thromboembolic Disease: Implications for Prevention, Antithrombotic Therapy, and Follow-Up: JACC State-of-the-Art Review". Journal of the American College of Cardiology 75 (23): 2950–2973.
- Kieron Dunleavy; Claire McLintock (2020) "How I treat lymphoma in pregnancy". Blood 136 (19): 2118–2124.
- Suzanne Murray; Claire McLintock; Patrice Lazure; Morgan Peniuta; Sam Schulman; Suely M. Rezende; James H. Morrissey; Thomas Reiser; Ingrid Pabinger (2019) "Needs and challenges among physicians and researchers in thrombosis and hemostasis: Results from an international study". Research and Practice in Thrombosis and Haemostasis3 (4): 626–638.
- Claire McLintock; Beverley J. Hunt (2019) "World Thrombosis Day and prevention of hospital-associated venous thromboembolism". Internal Medicine Journal 49 (10): 1207–1208
- Stephanie Cox; Renee Eslick; Claire McLintock (2019) "Effectiveness and safety of thromboprophylaxis with enoxaparin for prevention of pregnancy-associated venous thromboembolism". Journal of Thrombosis and Haemostasis 17 (7): 1160–1170.
