= William Klein =

Bill, Will, Willy, Willie or William Klein may refer to:

- William Klein (photographer) (1926–2022), American-French photojournalist and filmmaker
- Will Klein (baseball) (born 1999), American professional baseball player
- Willie Klein (1901–1957), American champion golfer
- Willy Klein (1912–2004), Luxembourgish Olympic gymnast in 1936
- Bill Klein (businessman) (born 1948), American high-stakes poker champion
- Bill Klein, American football end in 1950 NFL draft
- Bill Klein, American businessman on 2009 TV reality series The Little Couple

== See also ==
- William G. Kline (1882–after 1942), American football, baseball and basketball coach
- William Klyne (1913–1977), English organic chemist and academic, a/k/a Bill Klyne
- William Cline (disambiguation)
