= Bernadine Idowu =

British biochemist

Bernadine Deborah Idowu
- Education: King's College London; Queen Mary University of London
- Scientific career
- Thesis: The organisation of cytoskeletal components in islolated chondrocytes cultured in agarose (2000)

Bernadine Deborah Idowu is a British biochemist who is a professor at the University of West London. She was elected Fellow of the Academy of Medical Sciences in 2025.

== Early life and education ==
Idowu was born at King's College Hospital. Her parents were Nigerian. Her mother was a deputy head teacher in Nigeria. She studied biochemistry at King's College London, where she was one of only six Black undergraduates studying biochemistry. Her experiences as an undergraduate researcher inspired her to establish an initiative to support Black undergraduate biochemists, and she launched an annual conference in 2023. After graduating, she worked as a research assistant. Idowu moved to Queen Mary University of London for her doctoral research, where she studied cytoskeletal components in agarose. Idowu eventually returned to King's College London as a postdoctoral researcher, where she studied Beta thalassemia, a blood disorder that causes anaemia. She started teaching undergraduates, and joined forces with Ed Byrne to prepare King's race equality charter application.

== Research and career ==
Idowu was appointed Senior Lecturer and was responsible for developing the biochemical curriculum, with a particular focus on decolonising and diversifying the curriculum of the University of West London. In 2023, the Medical Research Council allocated £3.7m to support Black high school and university students. Idowu serves as co-Chair of the MRC Black in Biomedical Research Advisory Group.

Idowu was awarded the Roger Cotton Prize for the best paper of the journal Histopathology for her work on fibrous dysplasia, the most common tumour in Sub-Saharan Africa.

Idowu was promoted to Professor in 2024. In 2025, she was elected a Fellow of the Academy of Medical Sciences.

== Selected publications ==
- Nadège Presneau; Hongtao Ye; Nischalan Pillay; et al. (2010). "Role of the transcription factor T (brachyury) in the pathogenesis of sporadic chordoma: a genetic and functional-based study". The Journal of Pathology. 223 (3): 327–335. doi:10.1002/path.2816. PMID 21171078. Wikidata Q33274008.
- Lee, David A.; Knight, Martin; J F Bolton; B D Idowu; M V Kayser; D L Bader (2000). "Chondrocyte deformation within compressed agarose constructs at the cellular and sub-cellular levels". Journal of Biomechanics. 33 (1): 81–95. doi:10.1016/s0021-9290(99)00160-8. PMID 10609521. Wikidata Q30828825.
- B D Idowu; M Al-Adnani; P O'Donnell; L Yu; Odell, Edward; T Diss; R E Gale; A M Flanagan (2007). "A sensitive mutation-specific screening technique for GNAS1 mutations in cases of fibrous dysplasia: the first report of a codon 227 mutation in bone". Histopathology. 50 (6): 691–704. doi:10.1111/j.1365-2559.2007.02676.x. PMID 17493233. Wikidata Q80308062.
