= Robert Curran (physician) =

British pathologist (1921–2006)

Professor Robert Curran FRCP FRCPath
- Born: Robert Crowe Curran; 28 July 1921; Wishaw, Scotland
- Died: 5 September 2006 (aged 85)
- Education: Wishaw High School; Glasgow University
- Parent(s): John Hamilton Curran and Sarah Carson Crowe
- Relatives: Samuel Crowe Curran (brother)
- Scientific career
- Workplaces: Sheffield University; St Thomas' Medical School; Royal Indian Army Medical Corps; Royal College of Pathologists; Dept. of Pathology, Birmingham University; FRCP

Robert Crowe Curran (28 July 1921 – 5 September 2006) was a British pathologist, Leith Professor of Pathology, Birmingham University, 1966–1986.

He served as president of the Royal College of Pathologists from 1981 to 1984.

== Life ==
He was born in Wishaw in central Scotland the son of John Hamilton Curran, ex-foreman of the local steelworks, and his wife, Sarah Carson Crowe. His brother was the physicist Sir Samuel Crowe Curran. He was educated at Wishaw High School then studied medicine at Glasgow University graduating in 1943. From 1945 until 1947 he served as a physician with the Royal Army Medical Corps in India.

From 1950 to 1955 he lectured in pathology at Glasgow University. In 1955 he became senior lecturer in pathology at Sheffield University before receiving a professorship from St Thomas' Medical School in London in 1958. In 1966 he moved to the chair in pathology at Birmingham University. He was elected a Fellow of the Royal Society of Edinburgh but resigned in October 2000.

He died on 5 September 2006, aged 85.

== Publications ==
- Colour Atlas of Histopathology (1996)

== Family ==
He married Margaret Marion Park in 1947 following demobilisation from the army. They had one son, Andrew Curran, and one daughter, Marjorie Curran.

Educational offices
Preceded by John Anderson	President of the Royal College of Pathologists; 1981–1984	Succeeded by Dame Barbara Clayton
