= John Vivian Dacie =

British haematologist (1912–2005)

- Born: 20 July 1912; Putney, London, England
- Died: 12 February 2005 (aged 92)
- Awards: Fellow of the Royal Society (1967)
- Scientific career
- Institutions: King's College Hospital

Sir John Vivian Dacie, FRS (20 July 1912 – 12 February 2005) was a British haematologist.

== Early life ==
Dacie was born in Putney, London, England on 20 July 1912. His father was an accountant.

Dacie was educated at King's College School, Wimbledon. He studied medicine at King's College Hospital Medical School, graduating in 1935 and qualifying in 1936.

== Career ==
Dacie had house jobs at King's College Hospital, the Royal Postgraduate Medical School, London University, Hammersmith and a research post at Manchester Royal Infirmary. During World War II from 1943 to 1946, he served in the Royal Army Medical Corps, ending up a lieutenant colonel. After the war he was a senior lecturer and, then, in 1956 professor at the Royal Postgraduate Medical School.

He founded the Leukaemia Research Fund in 1960. His main achievements concerned the Hemolytic anemias, a field in which he was a world leader. He discovered and named Christmas disease, more commonly referred to as haemophilia B, a deficiency of coagulation Factor IX.

Dacie is credited with characterizing the relationship between paroxysmal nocturnal hemoglobinuria and bone marrow failure syndromes like aplastic anemia. He was founder of the Leukaemia Research Unit at Hammersmith Hospital in 1969. He was the founding editor of the British Journal of Haematology. He was president of the Royal College of Pathologists from 1973 to 1975 and the Royal Society of Medicine in 1977.

He had a lifelong interest in lepidoptera. He was knighted in 1976 and retired in 1977.

== Personal life ==
Dacie married Margaret Thynne in 1938. They had two daughters and three sons. He died on 12 February 2005 at the age of 92.

== Selected works ==
- Practical Haematology. Churchill, 1950; 10th edition (2006), LCCN 2005-53767 ISBN 0443066604 (pbk.)
- Haemolytic Anemias. Churchill, 1954; 2nd edition, Part I (1960), Part II (1962); 3rd edition, 3 volumes (1988–1992) LCCN 84-5849

Educational offices
Preceded by Sir Theo Crawford	President of the Royal College of Pathologists; 1972–1975	Succeeded by Sir Robert Williams
