= Theo Crawford =

British pathologist

Sir Theodore Crawford (23 December 1911 – 27 July 1993) was a British pathologist, Professor of Pathology in the University of London, 1948–1977.

Educational offices
Preceded by Sir James Howie	President of the Royal College of Pathologists; 1969 – 1972	Succeeded by Sir John Dacie
