= Robert Williams (pathologist) =

Welsh pathologist (1916–2003)

Sir Robert Williams FRCP FRCPath FFPHM

Director, Public Health Laboratory Service
- In office 1973–1981

Professor of Bacteriology, University of London
- In office 1960–1973

Personal details
- Born: Robert Evan Owen Williams; 20 June 1916
- Died: 24 May 2003 (aged 86)
- Occupation: Pathologist, bacteriologist

Sir Robert Evan Owen Williams (30 June 1916 – 24 May 2003) was a Welsh pathologist.

Educational offices
Preceded by Sir John Dacie	President of the Royal College of Pathologists; 1975–1978	Succeeded by John Anderson
