= Roy Cameron (pathologist) =

Australian pathologist

Sir Roy Cameron
- Cameron in 1947
- Born: Gordon Roy Cameron; 30 June 1899; Echuca, Victoria, Australia
- Died: 20 October 1969 (aged 70); Finchley, London, England
- Education: University of Melbourne
- Awards: Royal Medal (1960); Fellow of the Royal Society
- Scientific career
- Fields: Pathology
- Workplaces: University of Melbourne; Walter and Eliza Hall Institute of Medical Research; University College Hospital; Queen Mary's Hospital

Sir Gordon Roy Cameron (30 June 1899 – 7 October 1966) was an Australian pathologist.

== Childhood and education ==
Cameron was born in 1899 in Echuca, Victoria to George Cameron and his wife Emily Pascoe. He was educated at state schools in local villages including Mitiamo, Lancefield, Dunkeld and finally (from 1911 to 1917) at Kyneton, although from 1913 to 1917 he was occupied with compulsory military service. He gained a scholarship to Queen's College at the University of Melbourne, where he studied medicine from February 1916 to 1922, when he graduated with a second-class MB BS. A lecture by Harry Brookes Allen convinced Cameron to focus on pathology, and he was appointed Stewart Lecturer of Pathology at the University of Melbourne in 1924.

== Career ==
In 1925, Charles Kellaway invited Cameron to work at the Walter and Eliza Hall Institute of Medical Research as the deputy director, where he remained until 1927, when he left to take up a position at University College Hospital (UCH) under Arthur Boycott, with the idea that he would return to take over from Harry Allen. When his time in London was up however he discovered he did not want to return, and he instead took up board with Fred Crewe (Boycott's chief technician) and his wife Alice, with whom he lived for the rest of his life and who remained devoted to him. He never married. In 1929 he became Graham Scholar in Pathology at the Hospital, followed by a promotion to Beit Fellow for Medical Research in 1930. He spent a year as a pathologist at Queen Mary's Hospital but, unhappy with the job, returned to UCH in 1934, this time as a Reader in Pathology. Boycott retired as Reader in Morbid Anatomy in 1937 and Cameron succeeded him, although he then spent much of World War II working with Joseph Barcroft at Porton Down studying the effects of poison gas. After the war Roy returned to UCH, this time as head of the Graham department.

He retired in 1964 and died of heart disease on 7 October 1966.

He was knighted in 1957. He had made his only return visit to Australia in 1962 to accept an honorary Doctor of Laws from the University of Melbourne.

Educational offices
Preceded by not established	President of the Royal College of Pathologists; 1962 – 1966	Succeeded by Sir James Howie
