= Roderick MacSween =

Sir Roderick Norman McIver MacSween (2 February 1935 – 11 December 2015) was a Scottish pathologist, professor of pathology at University of Glasgow, 1984 to 1999.

MacSween was a past President of the Royal College of Pathologists (1996–99), a member of the General Medical Council (1998-2001) and was knighted for services to medicine and to pathology in 2000.

He was a chairman of Tenovus Scotland, which annually award the Sir Roddy MacSween prize and medal to a medical student of the University of Glasgow for outstanding performance in pathology.

He also chaired investigations into diseases affecting farmed fish. His Pathology of the liver has reached its 7th edition and is also an ebook.

== Sources ==
- MacSWEEN, Sir Roderick (Norman McIver), Who's Who 2012, A & C Black, 2012; online edn, Oxford University Press, December 2011; online edn, Nov 2011 accessed 22 February 2012

Educational offices
Preceded by Alastair Bellingham	President of the Royal College of Pathologists; 1996 – 1999	Succeeded by Sir John Lilleyman
