= Bernie Croal =

British clinical pathologist and medical academic

- Born: Aberdeen, Scotland
- Known for: President of the Royal College of Pathologists (2023–present)
- Awards: Fellow of the Royal College of Physicians and Surgeons of Glasgow; Fellow of the Institute of Biomedical Science
- Scientific career
- Fields: Chemical pathology; Laboratory medicine
- Workplaces: NHS Grampian; Royal College of Pathologists

Bernie Croal is a British clinical pathologist and medical academic who has served as President of the Royal College of Pathologists since November 2023. He is a Consultant Chemical Pathologist based in Aberdeen, where he has held senior roles in National Health Service laboratory medicine and contributed to national diagnostic policy and professional standards.

== Early life and education ==
Croal was born in Aberdeen and completed medical training before specialising in chemical pathology and clinical biochemistry. He is a Fellow of the Royal College of Physicians and Surgeons of Glasgow and the Institute of Biomedical Science.

== Career ==
Croal works as a Consultant Chemical Pathologist with NHS Grampian, with clinical interests including biochemical diagnostics and intravenous nutritional support. He also provides laboratory oversight for TDL Pathology in Aberdeen.

=== Professional leadership ===
Croal has held multiple leadership roles within the Royal College of Pathologists, including serving as Scotland Regional Council Chair for nine years and as a College Trustee for thirteen years. From 2011 to 2014, he was Vice-President of the College.

He previously served as President of the Association for Clinical Biochemistry and Laboratory Medicine (ACB-UK) before being elected President of the Royal College of Pathologists in 2023.

== Views and impact ==
Croal has spoken extensively on workforce challenges in diagnostic services, laboratory modernisation, the integration of genomics into routine practice, and the importance of investment in UK pathology infrastructure.

Preceded by Mike Osborn	President of the Royal College of Pathologists; 2023 – present	Succeeded by Incumbent
