= Douglas Fearon =

American medical immunologist

Professor Douglas Fearon FRS FRCP FMedSci
- Born: Douglas Thomas Fearon; 16 October 1942 (age 83)
- Education: Williams College (BA 1964); Johns Hopkins Medical School (MD 1968)
- Awards: FRS (1999); FRCP; FMedSci
- Scientific career
- Fields: Immunology
- Website: www.cshl.edu/Faculty/Douglas-Fearon.html

Douglas Thomas Fearon (born 16 October 1942) is an American medical immunologist, who has been since 2003 Sheila Joan Smith Professor of Immunology at the University of Cambridge, a fellow of Trinity College, Cambridge, and a professor at Cold Spring Harbor Laboratory.

== Awards and honours ==
Fearon was elected a Fellow of the Royal Society (FRS) in 1999 and is also member of the United States National Academy of Sciences. His nomination for the Royal Society reads:

The research of Douglas T. Fearon has helped establish a unifying principle in immunology; namely, that the two systems of immunity, innate and acquired, are integrated. The former identifies antigens of microbial origin to bias the response of the latter to those antigens. To support this thesis, he has 1) determined how the alternative complement pathway of innate immunity attaches C3 to microbial antigens; 2) demonstrated that the attached C3 causes antigen to be orders of magnitude more potent in eliciting an acquired immune response; and 3) characterised the CR2/CD19 receptor complex of B lymphocytes that mediates the enhanced immunogenicity of C3-bearing antigens, and the counter-regulatory coreceptor, CD22, that suppresses the cellular response to antigen.
