= Henri Bounameaux =

Swiss academic

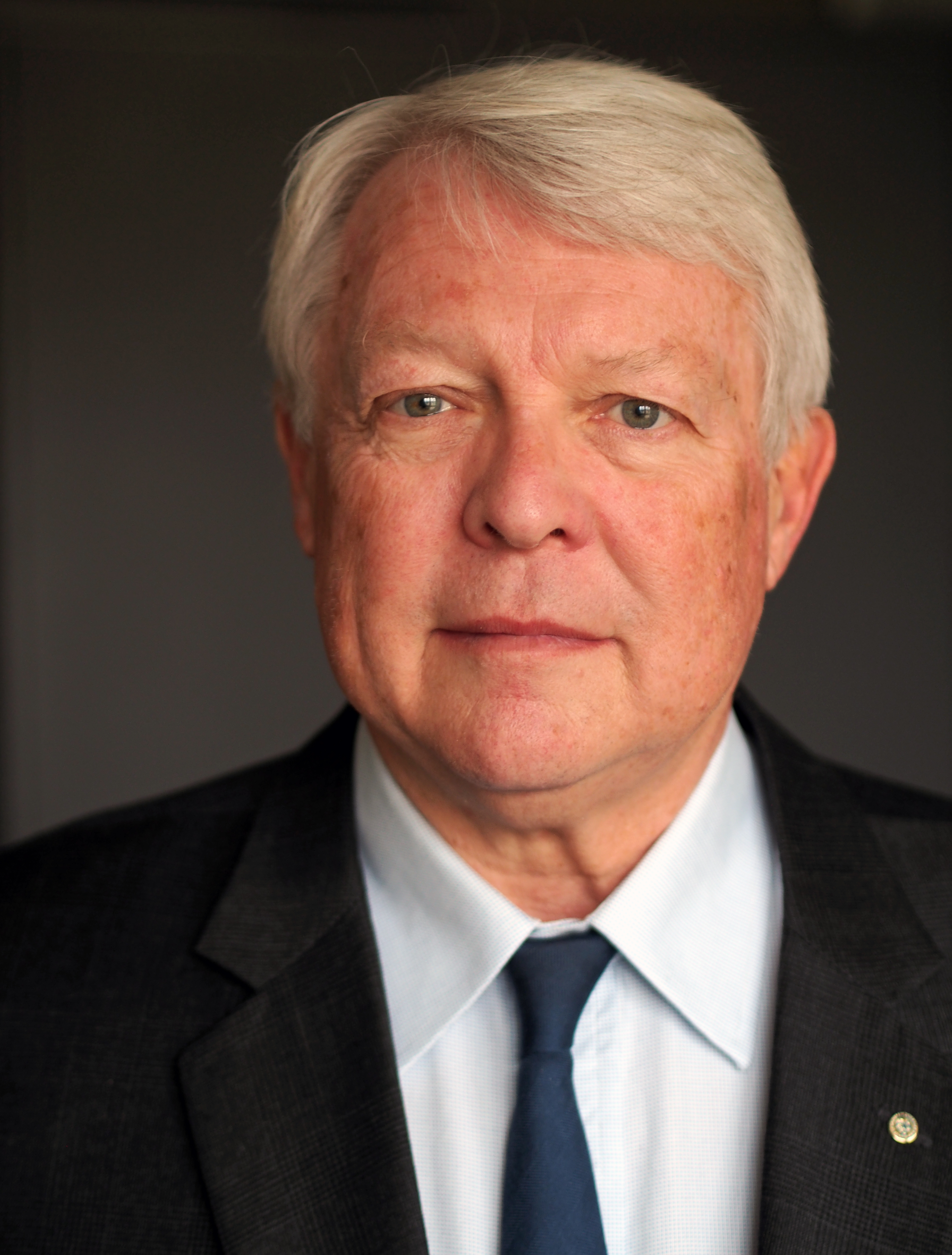
- Education: University of Basel
- Occupations: Professor of medicine,University of Geneva

Henri Bounameaux is a professor of medicine specialized in internal and vascular medicine (angiology), as well as general medicine.

Bounameaux served as the Dean of Faculty of Medicine at the University of Geneva, Switzerland. He is an emeritus professor at the University of Geneva and served as president of the Swiss Academy of Medical Sciences (SAMS) from 2020 to 2024.

Bounameaux's research interests relate to the prevention, diagnosis, and treatment of venous thromboembolism. His main contribution to the field relates to the non-invasive work-up of suspected pulmonary embolism, particularly the use of fibrin D-dimer. He was among the first scientists in the late eighties to suggest that this dosage in the patient plasma allowed to safely rule out venous thromboembolism, which was demonstrated in subsequent publications of the Geneva research group.

== Early life and education ==
Bounameaux was born in 1953 and spent his early childhood in the Belgian Congo (now the Democratic Republic of the Congo), living in Lubumbashi until 1967. His father Yves Bounameaux was Chief of medicine and Dean of the Faculty of medicine there.

After relocating to Switzerland at the age of 14, he pursued medical studies at the University of Basel, where he earned his medical degree in 1978. He later moved to Geneva in 1980, where he established his clinical and academic career.

Bounameaux completed his primary and secondary education in Lubumbashi (then Belgian Congo, later Zaïre) and obtained a Baccalauréat Type C in 1971 from St.-Louis, France.

He received his medical degree and post-graduate specialization from the Faculty of Medicine, University of Basel, and is board-certified in internal and vascular medicine (angiology). He completed the post-doctoral education from Center for Thrombosis and Vascular Research, Belgium.

== Career ==
Following clinical training in internal medicine at hospitals in Basel, Montreux, and Geneva, he completed a two-year postdoctoral fellowship at the University of Leuven in Belgium. In 1985, he returned to the Geneva University Hospitals (Hôpitaux Universitaires de Genève, HUG), where he would spend the remainder of his clinical and academic career.

He was appointed assistant physician in 1988 and, in 1993, became head of the Angiology and Hemostasis Service within the Department of Internal Medicine at HUG, a position he held until 2016. From 2002 to 2010, he also served as head of the Department of Internal Medicine.

In academia, Bounameaux became a Privat-docent in 1988, was promoted to associate professor in 1997, and was named full professor in 2002 in the Faculty of Medicine at the University of Geneva.

From 2010 to 2012, Bounameaux chaired the Council of the International Society on Thrombosis and Haemostasis (ISTH) after having organized its world congress in Geneva (2007). He was awarded the ISTH Distinguished Career Award in 2009 in recognition of his scientific contributions. In 2011, he was elected Dean of the Faculty of Medicine at the University of Geneva, a role he held for two consecutive terms until 2019. Concurrently, he also served as Director of Teaching and Research at HUG.

In 2015, Bounameaux was elected as an individual member of the Swiss Academy of Medical Sciences. During his presidency (2020-2024), the Academy initiated a project aiming to reform in depth the Swiss health system.

He was named Honorary Professor of the University of Geneva in July 2019.

== Research ==
Bounameaux's research interests are broad and include studies in non-invasive vascular diagnosis, venous thromboembolism and pulmonary embolism, cardiology, angiology and hemostasis. His main contribution to the field relates to the non-invasive work-up of suspected pulmonary embolism, particularly the use of fibrin D-dimer. He was among the first scientists in the late eighties to suggest that this dosage in the patient plasma allowed to safely rule out venous thromboembolism, which was demonstrated in subsequent publications of the Geneva research group.

Bounameaux is known for his contributions to the understanding, diagnosis, and treatment of venous thromboembolism (VTE), with a particular emphasis on thrombosis, pulmonary embolism, and the use of anticoagulants. His work has influenced clinical practice in the non-invasive diagnosis and management of thromboembolic disease.

Throughout his career, he has explored the implications of thromboembolism in cancer patients, surgical settings, and critical care.

From 2010 to 2021, Bounameaux's more recent work has focused on the clinical course of VTE in oncology, clot resolution dynamics following anticoagulation, and the management of right heart thrombi. His research during this period continued to integrate mortality risk analysis and treatment outcomes, often employing statistical tools such as hazard ratios and confidence intervals to inform evidence-based care.

== Personal life ==
In 1976, Bounameaux married Anne Carreau, M.Sc. (mathematics). The couple has two daughters: Claire (born in 1979), who is the mother of four children, and Dominique (born in 1982), who has two daughters. Outside of his professional activities, Bounameaux has maintained a long-standing interest in equestrian sports, particularly eventing, in which he has actively supported his daughter Dominique and granddaughter Lou.

== Awards ==
During his career, Bounameaux has received the following awards and honors:

- Theodor-Naegeli International Thrombosis Award
- President of the Swiss Society of Angiology
- Président of the Société d’Angiologie de Langue Française
- Chairman of the ISTH Council
- Distinguished Career Award from ISTH
- Honorary member of the Swiss Society of Angiology
- Honorary Fellow of the Swiss School of Public Health

== Publications ==
- Measurement of D-dimer in plasma as diagnostic aid in suspected pulmonary embolism.
- Diagnosis of pulmonary embolism by a noninvasive decision analysis-based strategy including clinical probability, D-Dimer levels, and ultrasonography: A Management Study
- Factor V Leiden Paradox: Risk of Deep Vein Thrombosis but not of Pulmonary embolism.
- Multidetector-Row Computed Tomography in Suspected Pulmonary Embolism.
- D-dimer for Venous Thromboembolism Diagnosis: Twenty Years Later.
- Oral Rivaroxaban for the Treatment of Symptomatic Pulmonary Embolism.
- Kearon, Clive; Akl, Elie A.; Comerota, Anthony J.; Prandoni, Paolo; Bounameaux, Henri; Goldhaber, Samuel Z.; Nelson, Michael E.; Wells, Philip S.; Gould, Michael K.; Dentali, Francesco; Crowther, Mark; Kahn, Susan R. (February 2012). "Antithrombotic Therapy for VTE Disease". Chest. 141 (2): e419S–e496S. doi:10.1378/chest.11-2301. PMC 3278049. PMID 22315268.
- "A randomised, blinded, trial of clopidogrel versus aspirin in patients at risk of ischaemic events (CAPRIE)". The Lancet. 348 (9038): 1329–1339. 1996-11-16. doi:10.1016/S0140-6736(96)09457-3. ISSN 0140-6736. PMID 8918275.
- "Oral Rivaroxaban for Symptomatic Venous Thromboembolism". New England Journal of Medicine. 363 (26): 2499–2510. 2010-12-23. doi:10.1056/NEJMoa1007903. ISSN 0028-4793.
- Le Gal, Grégoire; Righini, Marc; Roy, Pierre-Marie; Sanchez, Olivier; Aujesky, Drahomir; Bounameaux, Henri; Perrier, Arnaud (2006-02-07). "Prediction of Pulmonary Embolism in the Emergency Department: The Revised Geneva Score". Annals of Internal Medicine. 144 (3): 165–171. doi:10.7326/0003-4819-144-3-200602070-00004. ISSN 0003-4819.
- Goldhaber, Samuel Z.; Bounameaux, Henri (2012-05-12). "Pulmonary embolism and deep vein thrombosis". The Lancet. 379 (9828): 1835–1846. doi:10.1016/S0140-6736(11)61904-1. ISSN 0140-6736. PMID 22494827.
- Wicki, Jacques; Perneger, Thomas V.; Junod, Alain F.; Bounameaux, Henri; Perrier, Arnaud (2001-01-08). "Assessing Clinical Probability of Pulmonary Embolism in the Emergency Ward: A Simple Score". Archives of Internal Medicine. 161 (1): 92–97. doi:10.1001/archinte.161.1.92. ISSN 0003-9926.
- Bounameaux, H; de Moerloose, P; Perrier, A; Reber, G (1994). "Plasma Measurement of D-Dimer as Diagnostic Aid in Suspected Venous Thromboembolism: An Overview". Thrombosis and Haemostasis. 71 (1): 001–006. doi:10.1055/s-0038-1642375. ISSN 0340-6245.
