= Suzanne Cannegieter =

Dutch epidemiologist specialising in thrombosis and blood vessels

Suzanne C. Cannegieter is a Dutch epidemiologist and clinician specializing in the etiology, prevention and treatment of venous thrombosis, renal venous thrombosis and hemostasis. She holds a PhD in medicine from Leiden University and an MSc from the London School of Hygiene and Tropical Medicine. She is a clinical epidemiologist in the Departments of Clinical Epidemiology and Internal Medicine, Thrombosis and Hemostasis section of the Leiden University Medical Centre. In 2016 she was appointed Professor of Clinical Epidemiology and holds a visiting professor appointment at the Universidade de Minas Gerais in Belo Horizonte in Brazil.

== Research Awards ==
Cannegieter works in leadership roles on several Dutch national multicenter research studies. She is one of the principal investigators of a €3 million research grant awarded by the Dutch funding agency ZonMw to use predictive modelling to determine individual thrombosis risk and develop personalised treatment. Findings have been incorporated in clinical risk assessment in hospitals in the Netherlands, France and the UK.

== Achievements ==
In 2023 Cannegieter became the first woman co-Editor-in-Chief of the Journal of Thrombosis and Hemostasis (JTH). She is also Associate Editor of Research and Practice in Thrombosis and Haemostasis and Editorial Board Member for the Section Clinical Medicine of the journal PLOS Medicine. She worked as a Scientific Advisory Committee member of the Dutch Thrombosis Foundation and a board member for the Dutch charity Stichting De Merel, which supports healthcare research with a focus in medicine, recovery and rehabilitation.
