= Alastair Bellingham =

British haematologist (1938–2017)

Professor Alastair Bellingham CBE FRCP FRCPE FRCPGlas FRCPath
- Born: 27 March 1938; United Kingdom
- Died: 4 December 2017 (aged 79)
- Education: Tiffin Boys' School; University College London Hospital Medical School
- Known for: President of the British Society for Haematology (1992–1993); President of the Royal College of Pathologists (1993–1996); Chairman of the National Health Service Information Authority (1999 – at least 2004)
- Spouse(s): Valerie Jill (Morford) Bellingham (m. 1963–1997) Julia Bellingham
- Children: 3
- Scientific career
- Fields: Haematology
- Workplaces: University of Liverpool (1974–1984); King's College London (1984–1997)

Alastair John Bellingham (27 March 1938 – 4 December 2017) was a British haematologist.

== Early life and education ==
Bellingham was born in 1938 to Stanley Herbert Bellingham and Sybil Mary Milne. He was a graduate of Tiffin Boys' School and University College London Hospital Medical School.

== Career ==
Bellingham did research on red cell abnormalities including sickle-cell disease. From 1974 to 1984 he was at the Department of Haematology, University of Liverpool. Bellingham was also a professor at King's College London, 1984–1997.

== Personal life ==
He was married to Valerie Jill (Morford) Bellingham (m. 1963–1997, her death) and to Julia Bellingham.

== Death ==
Bellingham died on 4 December 2017, aged 79.

== Honors and awards ==
- President of the British Society for Haematology (1992–1993)
- President of the Royal College of Pathologists (1993–1996)
- Chairman of the National Health Service Information Authority (1999 – at least 2004)
- CBE
- FRCP
- FRCPE
- FRCPGlas
- FRCPath

Educational offices
Preceded by Sir Peter Lachmann	President of the Royal College of Pathologists; 1993 – 1996	Succeeded by Sir Roderick MacSween
