= Sheila Joan Smith Professor of Immunology =

The Sheila Joan Smith Professorship of Tumour Immunology at the University of Cambridge was originally established on 2 November 1977 for the tenure only of Peter Lachmann. It was renamed as the Sheila Joan Smith Professorship of Immunology in 1988 and was re-established on the retirement of Professor Lachmann.

== List of Sheila Joan Smith Professors of Tumour Immunology ==
- 1977–1988 Peter Lachmann

== List of Sheila Joan Smith Professors of Immunology ==
- 1988–1999 Peter Lachmann
- 2000–2010 Douglas Fearon
- 2014–present Paul Lehner
