= John Lilleyman =

British paediatric haematologist

Professor Sir John Lilleyman FRCP FRCPE FRCPCH FMedSci

Professor of Paediatric Oncology, St Bartholomew's Hospital Medical College/Barts and The London School of Medicine and Dentistry
- In office 1995–2006

Personal details
- Born: John Stuart Lilleyman; 9 July 1945 (age 80)

Sir John Stuart Lilleyman (born 9 July 1945) is a British paediatric haematologist. His specialization is childhood leukemia and idiopathic thrombocytopenic purpura.

== Career ==
Lilleyman contributed to the testing of leukemia treatment methods and conducted research on "thiopurine metabolism" in children with leukemia.

He was president of the Royal College of Pathologists during the Alder Hey organs scandal. During that time, he was vice-chairman of the Academy of the Medical Royal Colleges.

In 2004, he became medical director of the National Patient Safety Agency (NPSA).

== Awards and honours ==
In 1991, the Royal College of Pathologists awarded him its first Distinguished Service Medal for establishing the United Kingdom's system of pathology laboratory accreditation. He was appointed president of the Royal Society of Medicine in 2004 and was elected a Fellow of the Academy of Medical Sciences in 2007.

== Selected publications ==
=== Books ===
- John S. Lilleyman (1992)Paediatric Haematology. Publisher: Churchill Livingstone (1 November 1992). ISBN 0443043663
- John S. Lilleyman (1994). Childhood Leukaemia: The Facts (The Facts Series). Publisher: Oxford University Press (25 August 1994). ISBN 0192624512
- John S. Lilleyman (1999). Pediatric Hematology, 2e. Publisher: Churchill Livingstone; 2 edition (11 May 1999) ISBN 0443058407

Educational offices
Preceded by Sir Roderick MacSween	President of the Royal College of Pathologists; 1999 – 2002	Succeeded by Sir James Underwood
