= Suzy Lishman =

British consultant pathologist

Dame Suzy Lishman DBE
- Born: Suzannah Claire Lishman
- Education: Girton College, Cambridge (MB BChir); London Hospital Medical College
- Occupation: Histopathologist

Dame Suzannah Claire Lishman (born 1967 or 1968) is a histopathologist who served as President of the Royal College of Pathologists from 2014 to 2017.

== Career ==
Lishman was educated at Wakefield Girls' High School, The King's School, Ely, the Neale Wade Community College, and Girton College, Cambridge. After qualifying in medicine with a specialism in histopathology, she was appointed a consultant in 1999. She was an officer of the Royal College of Pathologists from 2005 and raised the profile of the specialty by introducing public engagement initiatives such as National Pathology Week and International Pathology Day. She has collaborated with the Science Museum, Royal Institution, Royal Society and Cheltenham Science Festival. She was elected President of the Royal College of Pathologists in 2014 and was the College's second female president. Lishman was elected President of the Association of Clinical Pathologists in 2022 and was appointed Chair of the National Enquiry into Patient Outcome and Death (NCEPOD) in 2024.

== Clinical practice ==
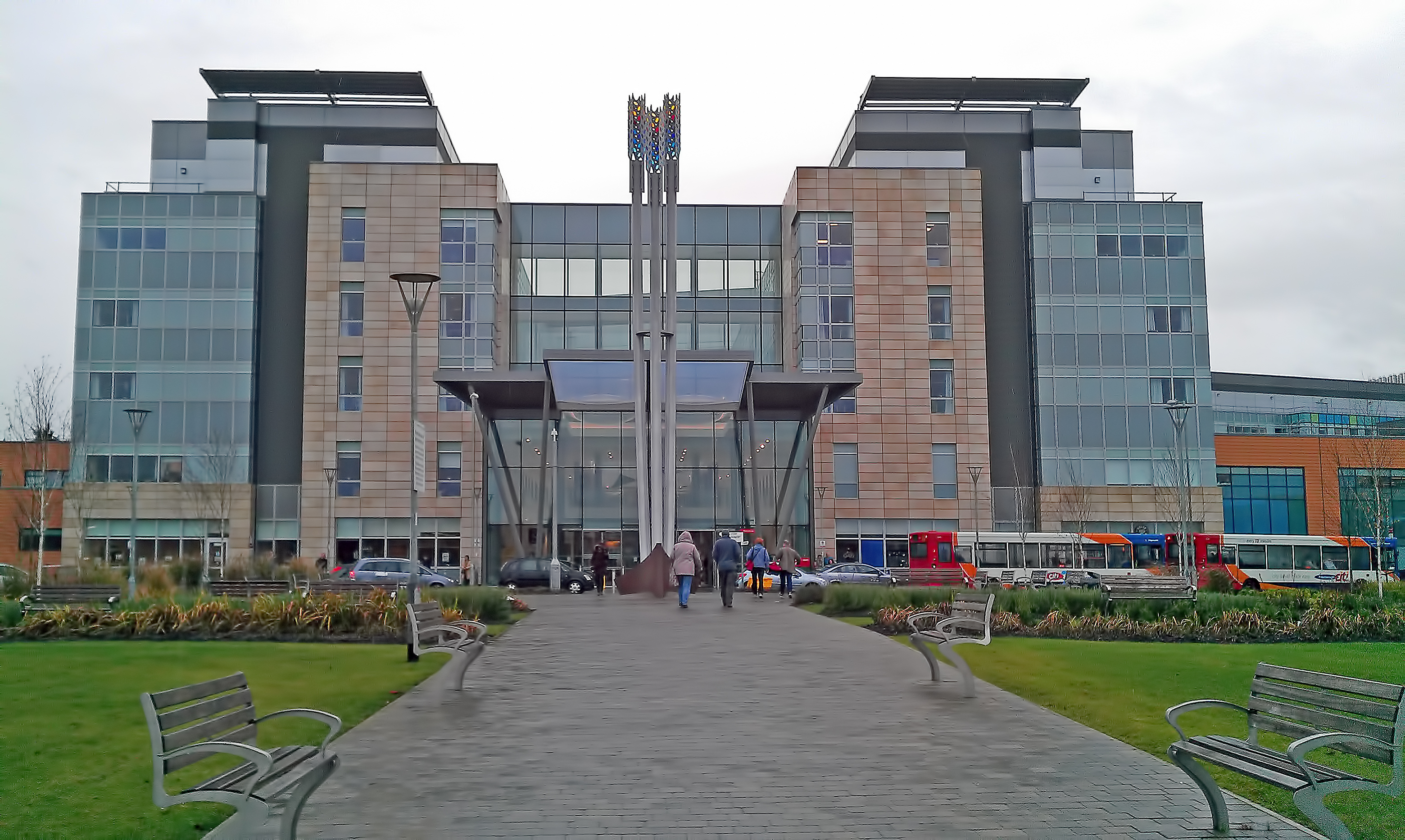
Peterborough City Hospital

Lishman is a consultant cellular pathologist and medical examiner at Peterborough City Hospital. She is lead pathologist for colorectal cancer.

== Achievements ==
In addition to her election as President of the Royal College of Pathologists, she was named one of the fifty most inspirational women in healthcare in 2013 by the Health Service Journal which described her as the 'public face of pathology' and 'the most outward facing person from that specialism'. Lishman was appointed a Commander of the Order of the British Empire (CBE) 'for services to pathology' in the 2018 New Year Honours, and promoted to Dame Commander of the same Order (DBE) 'for services to the medical examiner system and to patient safety'.
