= Peter Lachmann =

British immunologist (1931–2020)

Sir Peter Lachmann FRS FMedSci
- Born: 23 December 1931
- Died: 26 December 2020 (aged 89)
- Awards: Fellow of the Royal Society; Fellow of the Academy of Medical Sciences
- Scientific career
- Workplaces: University of Cambridge
- Thesis: The immunological properties of cell nuclei, with special reference to the serological aspects and patho-genesis of systemic Lupus Erythematosus (1962)
- Doctoral advisors: Robin Coombs and Henry Kunkel
- Doctoral students: Mark Walport

Sir Peter Julius Lachmann FRS FMedSci (23 December 1931 – 26 December 2020) was a British immunologist, specialising in the study of the complement system. He was emeritus Sheila Joan Smith Professor of Immunology at the University of Cambridge, a fellow of Christ's College, Cambridge and honorary fellow of Trinity College, Cambridge and of Imperial College. He was knighted for service to medical science in 2002.

== Biography ==
Born into a German Jewish family in Berlin on 23 December 1931, he moved to London in 1938. He went to school at Christ's College, Finchley, then trained in medicine at Trinity College, Cambridge, and University College Hospital, graduating in 1956, and obtained his PhD (1962) and ScD (1974) degrees at Cambridge in immunology.

== Scientific work ==
Sir Peter's most notable contribution is the formulation of the C3 tickover hypothesis, which elucidates the spontaneous activation of complement component C3 and its amplification via the alternative pathway. This concept has been pivotal in understanding both normal immune function and pathological conditions such as autoimmune diseases and age-related macular degeneration.

Lachmann's primary research interest was the downregulation of the complement alternative pathway as a treatment for age related macular degeneration. He has previously worked on many aspects of complement biology; on microbial subversion of the innate immune response; on the immunology of measles, on systemic lupus erythematosus and on insect sting allergies.

== Honours ==
Lachmann held a Chair at Cambridge University and served as President of the Royal College of Pathologists, Vice President and Biological Secretary of the Royal Society, and Founder President of the UK's Academy of Medical Sciences. His posts in immunology included Head and Honorary Head of the Medical Research Council Group on Mechanisms in Tumour Immunity and Honorary Director of the MRC Mechanisms in Tumour Immunity Unit.

He was also at one point Associate Editor of the journal Clinical and Experimental Immunology. From 1976 to 1999, he was Honorary Clinical Immunologist with the Cambridge Health Authority. Lachmann also won a Gold Medal from the European Complement Network in 1997 and the Medicine and Europe Senior Prize of the Académie des Sciences de la Santé in 2003.

He was a member of the Norwegian Academy of Science and Letters, Foreign Fellow of the Indian National Science Academy (1997), Honorary Foreign Member of the Czech Academy of Medicine (2012) as well as an honorary member of the British Society for Immunology.

== Public affairs ==
Lachmann helped produce the Royal Society's first report on genetically modified crops in 1998. The report, Genetically Modified Plants for Food Use, outlined the benefits of GM plants in agriculture, medicine, food quality and safety, nutrition and health, especially in alleviating food shortage in third-world countries. This caused him to be regarded as a controversial figure by the anti-GM food lobby.

In 1999, he tried to persuade the editor of The Lancet not to publish Árpád Pusztai's research on the adverse effects of GM potatoes on rats on the grounds that Lachmann thought it was not sound science. The Lancet's editor, Richard Horton, said he received a "very aggressive" phone call calling him "immoral" and threatening that if he published the paper it would "have implications for his personal position" as editor. Lachmann responded that he had made the call, but denied that he threatened Horton and said the call was to "discuss his error of judgment" in publishing the Pusztai letter and to discuss the "moral difficulties about publishing bad science". Lachmann's own account of GMOs and the Pusztai affair can be found in Panic Nation (2005).

Lachmann was a proponent of the defence of reason and scepticism in scientific academia and on topics that extend from vaccine scares to stem cell technology and to alternative medicine. He was also a beekeeper and this led to his interest in the evolution of group behaviour in both bees and humans and the role of religious prescription as the building blocks of cultural evolution.

== Sources ==
- "Examination of Witnesses (Questions 80-87)." House of Lords–Science and Technology–Minutes of Evidence, 4 June 2009
- "The law has no place in scientific disputes." Sense About Science, 4 June 2009
- "The MMR controversy: an investigation. Part three." Melanie Phillips's Articles. 4 June 2009 .
- Open letter about ‘GM’ from UK scientists to HM Government From Professor Derek Burke and others" Chemophilia, 4 June 2009
- "Professor Sir Peter Lachmann (DSc) - Distinguished Immunologist." University of Leicester, 4 June 2009
- "Sir Peter Lachmann" "Genetically Modified Organisms" in "Panic Nation" Chapter 18 pps 153-162 Eds Stanley Feldman and Vincent Marks, London John Blake, 2005
- "Sir Peter Lachmann" The Academy of Medical Sciences, 4 June 2009

Educational offices
Preceded by not established	President of the Academy of Medical Sciences, United Kingdom; 1998 – 2002	Succeeded by Sir Keith Peters
Preceded by Sir Dillwyn Williams	President of the Royal College of Pathologists; 1993 – 1996	Succeeded by Alastair Bellingham
