= Allan Victor Hoffbrand =

Allan Victor Hoffbrand FRCP FRCPath FMedSci
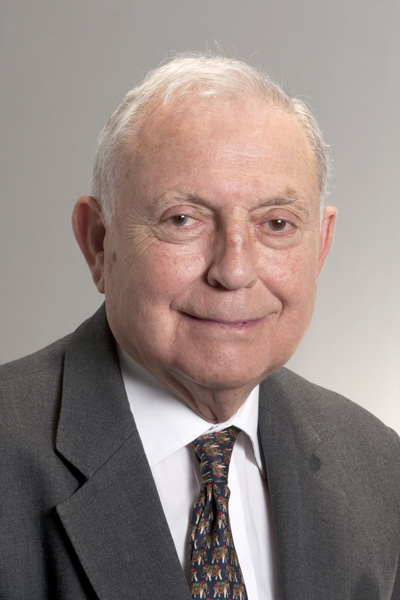
- Hoffbrand, 2012
- Born: 1935 (age 90–91); Bradford, Yorkshire, England
- Education: University of Oxford (BA, BM BCh, DM)
- Alma mater: The Queen’s College, Oxford; Royal London Hospital
- Occupations: Haematologist; Academic physician; Medical researcher; Author
- Years active: 1959–present
- Employer: University College London
- Known for: Research on megaloblastic anaemia; Iron chelation therapy; Classification of leukaemia and lymphoma; Author of major haematology textbooks
- Title: Emeritus Professor of Haematology
- Spouse: Jill Mellows (m. 1963)
- Children: 3
- Awards: Wallace H. Coulter Award for Lifetime Achievement in Hematology (2018); British Society for Haematology Lifetime Achievement Award (2019); Sultan Bin Khalifa Grand International Thalassemia Award (2018); President’s Medal, Royal College of Physicians
- Honours: Fellow of the Academy of Medical Sciences (2000)

Allan Victor Hoffbrand is emeritus Professor of Haematology at University College, London. He is distinguished for his research and as an author of internationally read textbooks of haematology. He was born in Bradford, Yorkshire in 1935. After education at Bradford Grammar School, he gained an Open Scholarship in 1953 to The Queen's College, Oxford. He gained a BA degree in Physiology and began clinical studies at The (now Royal) London Hospital in 1957 and qualified in medicine at University of Oxford, BM BCH in 1959.

== Academic career ==
He began a career in haematology at the Postgraduate (now Royal) Medical School, Hammersmith Hospital joining a Medical Research Council Group in the field of megaloblastic anaemia (Director D L Mollin) in 1963. He established the first reliable method for measuring red cell folate and used this assay to determine the incidence of folate deficiency in a wide range of clinical diseases. After a year as an MRC scholar spent at the New England Medical Center, Boston, USA, 1967–1968, he returned to the Haematology Department of the Royal Postgraduate Medical School (Director Sir John Dacie). His further research was into vitamin B12/folate interrelations and the DNA defect in megaloblastic anaemia.

He was appointed as the first Professor of Haematology at the Royal Free Hospital and Medical School in London University in 1973 where he was to spend the rest of his career. He established a major Clinical and Laboratory in Haematology Department, teaching both undergraduates and postgraduates. Within his department, he began an immunology section, later to become a major independent department. Research was mainly into malignant haematological diseases. In conjunction with George Janossy and Mel Greaves, newly discovered monoclonal antibodies were used to classify and diagnose leukaemias and lymphomas. Molecular biological techniques were added to the biological, biochemical and immunological research. The Department expanded, attracting many research fellows internationally. Some of the first studies into minimal residual disease, now widely used for tracking patients’ response to therapy were performed. With the appointment of Grant Prentice in 1976 the department became one of the earliest in the UK to perform bone marrow transplants, and showed for the first time that graft-versus-host disease could be prevented by depletion of donor marrow of T lymphocytes.

His other research concerned removal of iron from multiple transfused patients with thalassaemia major and other refractory anaemias. In 1976, Richard Propper and David Nathan suggested the use of subcutaneous desferrioxamine to prevent death from iron overload in these diseases. The same year Hoffbrand's group confirmed the success of this new therapy. In 1987, the first use of a clinically effective oral iron chelating agent, deferiprone, was reported from his group including George Kontoghiorghes and Beatrix Wonke and in 1998, the first use of combination iron chelation therapy. These advances have substantially improved the life expectancy of many thousands of sufferers from these blood disorders.

He has trained in research and in clinical and laboratory haematology, many haematologists who have established their own Academic Departments in the UK, and in many countries worldwide including, Australia, Canada, Germany, Hong Kong, India, Italy, Lebanon, New Zealand, Pakistan, Poland and USA.

== Honours ==
He gained the MA (1960), MRCP (1962), DCP (1963), DM (Oxon) (1972), FRCP (1976), FRCPath (1980), FRCP (Edin) (1986), D.Sc. (London University) (1987) and was elected F. Med. Sci. (2000). He was awarded an Honorary DSc. Queen Mary London in 2012. In 2018, he was awarded the Sultan Bin Khalifa Grand International Thalassemia Award, the President's Medal of the Royal College of Physicians, and The American Society of Hematology awarded him with the Wallace H. Coulter Award for Lifetime Achievement in Hematology. In 2019, he received the British Society for Haematology Lifetime Achievement Award and an Honorary DSc (Med) from University College, London.

He has been visiting professor in Melbourne, Toronto, Rawalpindi, Chandigarh, South Africa, and advised the Ministries of Health in Kuwait, Cyprus and Hong Kong on their haematology services. He has given invited lectures in 40 different countries. From 2012 to 2013 he was a Fellow Commoner at The Queen's College, Oxford.

== Works ==
Hoffbrand has written over 700 scientific articles and chapters in books. He became one of the 250 most quoted scientists in 1976.

He has co-authored two undergraduate text books. Hoffbrand's Essential Haematology, Editions 1-4 with Jon Pettit, Editions 4-7 with Paul Moss, Edition 8 with David Steensma, and in 2024 Edition 9 with Pratima Chowdary, Graham Collins, and Justin Loke (translations of various editions into Chinese, French, German, Greek, Hungarian, Indonesian Japanese, Korean, Polish, Portuguese, and Spanish). It won the British Medical Association (BMA) Student Textbook Award 2016. His second undergraduate book, Haematology at a Glance with Atul Mehta, is now in its fourth edition. He has co-authored Color Atlas of Clinical Haematology (awarded best book in internal medicine in 2010 by the British Medical Association), now in its fifth edition. He was Editor-in-Chief of the main British textbook of Haematology, Postgraduate Haematology, 7th edition. He was Consulting Editor for Hoffbrand’s Postgraduate Haematology, 8th Edition, 2025. He authored the Haematology section of the British National Formulary 1971–1992. He was chairman of the editorial board of the British Journal of Haematology from 1990 to 2000 and has served on the editorial boards of 12 other journals. With Robin Foa he edited Reviews in Clinical & Experimental Haematology (2000-2005) and also co-edited with Malcolm Brenner seven editions of Recent Advances of Haematology between 1987 and 1996. In 2023 he authored The Folate Story: A vitamin under the microscope.

== Committees ==
He served as president of the British Society of Haematology (1989–1990). For the 60th anniversary of the BSH in 2020, he was interviewed as part of the BSH Past Presidents interview series. He was a Founding Counsellor of the European Haematology Association, (1992–1997). He was a member of the Systems Board of the MRC (1983–1987) and of the Council of the Royal College of Pathologists (1988–1990) and Chairman of Haematological Malignancies Subcommittee (1987–1991). He was chairman of the first Joint Haematology Committee between the Royal Colleges of Physicians and Pathologists (1994–1996) and Chairman of the Standing Intercollegiate Oncology Committee (1992–1999). He was a member of the Government Working Party, (COMA) concerning fortification of the UK diet with folic acid. In 2019, he was elected to the Royal Free London Council of Governors.

== Charities ==
He was a trustee of the UK Hadassah Medical Foundation for 23 years and has been a trustee of the Naef Basile Cancer Charity, Lebanon and USA. He was chairman of the Scientific Committee of the UK Charity Children with Leukaemia (now Children with Cancer UK). He has also acted as medical advisor to the Gaucher's Association and the UK Thalassaemia Society. He serves on the expert panel for the Wolfson Intercalated BSC Awards and served on the panel for the Daniel Turnberg Travelling Fellowships.

== Personal life ==
He married Jill Mellows in 1963, and they have one daughter, two sons, and five grandchildren. In 2020 he published his memoirs, reviewed. He began collecting English 17th and 18th century apothecary jars in 1970s. This collection is now displayed at the Royal College of Physicians. He co-authored English Delftware Apothecary Jars And Their Contents: The Victor Hoffbrand Collection (with Alan Humphries and Henry Oakeley) detailing the collection.
