= Rare Bleeding Disorder Database =

International registry for rare bleeding disorders

- RBDD / EN-RBD
- Abbreviation: RBDD
- Established: 2004
- Founder: Scientific and Standardization Committee (SSC) / University of Milan
- Dissolved: 2011
- Purpose: Rare coagulopathies data collection and research
- Region served: Global (with strong European network integration)
- Key people: Flora Peyvandi
- Website: www.rbdd.eu

Rare Bleeding Disorder Database (RBDD) was an international registry and database established to collect clinical, phenotypic, genotypic, and treatment data on patients with rare bleeding disorders (RBDs). Initiated in 2004, the database served as a collaborative global platform for clinicians, researchers, and computer scientists to improve the understanding, diagnosis, and clinical management of rare coagulopathies.

== History and development ==
The RBDD was conceived in 2004 within the Factor VIII (FVIII) and Factor IX (FIX) subcommittee of the Scientific and Standardization Committee (SSC). Coordinated by the University of Milan under the direction of researcher Flora Peyvandi, the project brought together international clinicians and researchers to build a standardized evidence base for conditions affecting small patient populations worldwide.

To address specific gaps in European data, the European Commission provided funding support from 2007 to 2010 to establish the European Network of Rare Bleeding Disorders (EN-RBD). This network expanded the framework of the original RBDD by incorporating 13 European treatment centers across 11 countries (Belgium, Denmark, Germany, Greece, France, Ireland, Italy, Serbia, Slovenia, Turkey, and the United Kingdom) to retrospectively and prospectively harmonize data collection.

The network aimed to connect treatment centers, standardize laboratory methods for phenotype and genotype analysis according to International Society on Thrombosis and Haemostasis (ISTH) rules, and produce evidence-based guidelines for diagnosis and treatment. Furthermore, the network sought to encourage pharmaceutical companies and regulatory agencies—such as the FDA and EMEA—to develop and approve specific treatment concentrates that were previously unavailable, such as Factor V (FV) and Factor X (FX) concentrates.

Following the initial EN-RBD project, the database expanded further as part of the prospective project (PRO-RBDD), which was integrated as one of the four core pillars of the EUHANET (European Haemophilia Network) consortium funded by the European Commission.

== Scope and data collection ==
The database tracks comprehensive patient profiles, including demographic details, clinical manifestations, laboratory phenotypes, genotypes, and treatment product utilization.

Initially tracking over 350 patients across 21 countries, the RBDD expanded through global center adhesions to include epidemiological information from over 3,230 patients across 66 centers worldwide. Separately, the EN-RBD European project retrospectively analyzed data from 592 patients affected by various rare bleeding disorders during its initial implementation phase.

Data gathered through the platform revealed significant global disparities in treatment availability. While European nations were generally well-supplied with specific factor concentrates, fresh frozen plasma (FFP) remained widely used globally and served as the primary treatment option in regions such as Asia, Africa, and Central and South America where specific concentrates were scarce.

== Technical infrastructure and privacy ==
The EN-RBD web application was developed using open-source technologies, featuring an Apache web server, PHP scripting capabilities, and a MySQL relational database management system (RDBMS).

Due to the sensitive nature of medical data, strict security protocols were implemented using Authentication, Authorization, and Accounting (AAA) methods. In compliance with European privacy laws, personal identification data were excluded from the database. The project protocols and platform operations received formal approval from the Ethical Review Board of the IRCCS Foundation Maggiore Hospital, Mangiagalli and Regina Elena, at the University of Milan, alongside written informed consent from all participating patients.

== Major research findings ==
Data pooled from the database have enabled pioneering analyses on rare coagulopathies. A notable study published in the Journal of Thrombosis and Haemostasis in 2012 analyzed the relationship between laboratory phenotype and clinical bleeding severity across different factor deficiencies.

Using linear regression, researchers found strong correlations between activity levels and clinical severity for fibrinogen, factors V+VIII, FX, and FXIII, good correlations for FV and FVII deficiencies, and no correlation for FXI deficiency. This work represented one of the first large-scale classifications of rare bleeding disorders based on combined clinical and laboratory parameters.
