= International Society on Thrombosis and Haemostasis =

The International Society on Thrombosis and Haemostasis (ISTH) is a not-for-profit global membership organization of specialists in the field of blood coagulation and its disorders, such as thrombosis and hemophilia. It was founded in 1954 as the International Committee on Thrombosis and Haemostasis (ICTH). The society was reorganized in 1969 as the ISTH. It currently represents about 5,000 members from 98 different countries. The society initiates and promotes education and outreach initiatives, research activities, scientific meetings, peer-reviewed publications, expert committees and the development of standards allowing a common language and approach to basic and clinical science all over the world. It also publishes the medical journal Journal of Thrombosis and Haemostasis and its open access counterpart, Research and Practice in Thrombosis and Haemostasis.

== Mission statement ==
The International Society on Thrombosis and Haemostasis (ISTH) advances the understanding, prevention, diagnosis and treatment of conditions related to thrombosis and hemostasis.

== Scientific and standardization committee ==
The Scientific and Standardization Committee (SSC) began in 1954 as the International Committee for the Standardization of the Nomenclature of the Blood Clotting Factors. The SSC is a permanent committee of the ISTH and is its scientific working arm. Conducted through 20 subcommittees and working groups, its activities promote cooperation among leading international scientists and direct their energies to projects that generate reliable and standardized clinical and basic science tools.

In 2004, its Factor VIII and Factor IX subcommittee supported the establishment of the Rare Bleeding Disorder Database to collect clinical and phenotypic data on rare coagulopathies.

== Meetings ==
The annual ISTH Congress is the premier event in the field of thrombosis and hemostasis featuring the latest scientific breakthroughs and clinical updates. Clinicians, researchers, educators, students/trainees, allied healthcare professionals and industry partners attend these events to exchange the latest in scientific innovation and to advance the overall understanding, prevention, diagnosis and treatment of thrombotic and bleeding disorders. The event also features the annual meeting of the Society's Scientific and Standardization Committee (SSC).

== ISTH Academy ==
The ISTH Academy is the online education platform for the society. The ISTH Academy features webinars, webcasts, online courses and access to abstracts and posters from past ISTH meetings.

== Publications ==
- Journal of Thrombosis and Haemostasis, official medical journal of the ISTH
- Research and Practice in Thrombosis and Haemostasis, open-access journal of the ISTH

== Past presidents and council chairmen ==
The past presidents (from 2016) and council chairmen (before 2016) of ISTH are:

- Pantep Angchaisuksiri (2024-2026)
- Flora Peyvandi (2022–2024)
- Jeffrey Weitz (2020–2022)
- Claire McLintock (2018–2020)
- Ingrid Pabinger (2016–2018)
- Nigel Key (2014–2016)
- Michael Berndt (2012–2014)
- Henri Bounameaux (2010–2012)
- Frits Rosendaal (2008–2010)
- Ian R Peake (2006–2008)
- Kenneth A Bauer (2004–2006)
- Bonno N Bouma (2002–2004)
- Uri Seligsohn (2000–2002)
- Edward F Plow (1998–2000)
- Yale Nemerson (1996–1998)
- Hidehiko Saito (1994–1996)
- Dominique Meyer (1992–1994)
- Kenneth G Mann (1990–1992)
- Jozef Vermylen (1988–1990)
- Victor J Marder (1986–1988)
- Arthur L Bloom (1984–1986)
- Jan J Sixma (1982–1984)
- Ted Spaet (1980–1982)
- Jack Hirsh (1978–1980)
- Roger W Hardisty (1976–1978)
