= James Howie (bacteriologist) =

Scottish bacteriologist

Sir James Howie FRCP FRCPGlas FRCPE FRCPath

Director, Public Health Laboratory Service
- In office 1963–1973

Professor of Bacteriology, University of Glasgow
- In office 1951–1963

Personal details
- Born: James William Howie; 31 December 1907
- Died: 17 March 1995 (aged 87)

Sir James William Howie (31 December 1907 – 17 March 1995) was a Scottish bacteriologist, Director of the Public Health Laboratory Service, 1963–1973.

In November 1966, he was installed as the President of the College of Pathologists.

Educational offices
Preceded by Sir Roy Cameron	President of the Royal College of Pathologists; 1966 – 1969	Succeeded by Sir Theo Crawford
