= John Anderson (pathologist) =

Scottish pathologist

John Russell Anderson CBE FRSE (31 May 1918 – 30 October 2011) was a Scottish pathologist, Professor of Pathology at the Western Infirmary, University of Glasgow, 1967–1983. Colleagues knew him as JRA.

== Life ==
Anderson was born in Middlesbrough on 31 May 1918, the son of a Glasgow-trained GP. He won a scholarship to study medicine at the University of St Andrews. He 1939 he graduated with a BSc in Anatomy, and MB in 1942.

After graduation he worked in hospitals in Dundee and began specialising in pathology under Prof Daniel Fowler Cappell. He then spent 1945 to 1947 completing National Service in Ghana, Libya and Egypt. He rose to the rank of captain in the Royal Army Medical Corps.

He returned to Scotland to lecture in pathology at the University of Glasgow, also working at Glasgow Western Infirmary. He then became the George Holt Professor of Pathology at the University of Liverpool. In 1967 he returned to Glasgow as professor of pathology at the university.

In 1968, he was elected a Fellow of the Royal Society of Edinburgh.

Anderson was a founder member of the British Society for Immunology.

In the 1980 Birthday Honours Anderson was appointed a Commander of the Order of the British Empire (CBE).

He retired in 1983, and died on 30 October 2011.

== Publications ==
- Immune Antibodies (1955)
- Auto-Immunity, Clinical and Experimental (1967)

Educational offices
Preceded by Robert Williams	President of the Royal College of Pathologists; 1978 – 1981	Succeeded by Robert Curran
