= Barbara Clayton =

British pathologist (1922–2011)

Professor Dame Barbara Clayton DBE FRCP FRCPath FMedSci
- Born: 2 September 1922; Liverpool, England
- Died: 11 January 2011 (aged 88)
- Education: University of Edinburgh
- Spouse: William Klyne
- Children: 2
- Medical career
- Profession: Pathologist, researcher, academic
- Sub-specialties: Endocrinology, metabolic disorders
- Notable works: Test to diagnose phenylketonuria
- Awards: Gold medal of the British Medical Association

Dame Barbara Evelyn Clayton (2 September 1922 – 11 January 2011) was an English pathologist who made a significant contribution to clinical medicine, medical research and public service. She was latterly Professor of Clinical Pathology at Great Ormond Street Hospital, London.

== Biography ==
Clayton was born in Liverpool on 2 September 1922 to Constance Evelyn (née Caine) and William Clayton, a food scientist who is credited with inventing salad cream. She was educated at St Nicholas Preparatory School in Orpington and Bromley County School for Girls, where she was head girl. She went on to study medicine at the University of Edinburgh, qualifying in 1946. Her interest in research took her to the Medical Research Council clinical endocrinology unit in Edinburgh. In 1949 she received a PhD for her research into oestrogens in 1949.

Later that year she moved to London to become the Holden research fellow at St Thomas's Hospital Medical School, a position she held until 1956 when she became a chemical pathology lecturer at the School. Her research on hormones and the development of new biochemical techniques brought her recognition.

In 1959, she moved to Great Ormond Street Hospital to become a consultant pathologist. There she researched genetic metabolic disorders suffered by newborn babies. She developed a new, less invasive test to diagnose phenylketonuria – the test and the special diet that Claydon also designed continue to be in common use today. She worked with dieticians to optimize diets for infants with phenylketonuria and other metabolic disorders.

Over her career, Clayton published more than 200 academic papers. Concerned with the high levels of lead found in children's blood she co-authored, with five others, the article 'Lead poisoning in children' (Arch dis child 1964, 39, 1–13) and while a member of the Royal Commission on Environmental Pollution in the 1980s, campaigned and lobbied the UK government to enforce a ban on lead in petrol, paint and other products. Her work showed a relationship between lead poisoning and intellectual impairment.

In 1978 she became the University of Southampton's first female professor when she took up the position of Professor of Chemical Pathology and Human Metabolism. She was Dean of Medicine at the university from 1983 to 1986, and honorary consultant chemical pathologist at the Southampton General Hospital. In 1987 she was appointed Honorary Research Professor in Metabolism and researched the nutritional needs of the elderly, particularly those in care homes.

She served on the Royal Commission on Environmental Pollution from 1981 to 1996 and chaired the enquiry into the Camelford water pollution incident in 1988. She concluded that the symptoms locals experienced after the Camelford incident were caused by anxiety due to media coverage.

== Personal life ==
She met chemist William Klyne in 1947 while they were both employed at the Medical Research Council in Edinburgh. They married in 1949, and remained married until William Klyne's death in 1977. Together they had two children.

== Awards ==
- 2000: Elected Fellow of the Academy of Medical Sciences.
- 1999: Received the Gold Medal of the British Medical Association.
- 1988: Named Dame Commander of the Order of the British Empire in 1988 for her contributions to science.
- 1983: Named Commander of the Order of the British Empire.

== Significant positions held ==
- 1999–2007 Honorary President of the British Nutrition Foundation
- 1988–1998 Chair of the Department of Health's Standing Committee on Postgraduate Medical and Dental Education.
- 1995–1997 President of the National Society for Clean Air and Environmental Pollution.
- 1993–1996 Led the Nutrition Task Force for the Health of the Nation, on behalf of the Department of Health and the Ministry of Agriculture, Fisheries and Food.
- 1984–1987 President of the Royal College of Pathologists.
- 1981–1982 President of the Biomedical Science Section of the British Association for the Advancement of Science.
- 1981–1982 President of the Society for the Study of Inborn Errors of Metabolism.
- 1977–1978 President of the Association of Clinical Biochemists.

Educational offices
Preceded by Robert Curran	President of the Royal College of Pathologists; 1987–1990	Succeeded by Sir Dillwyn Williams
