= Journal of Clinical Pathology =

- Discipline: Pathology
- Language: English
- Edited by: Vikram Deshpande

Publication details
- History: 1947-present
- Publisher: BMJ Group (United Kingdom)
- Frequency: Monthly
- Open access: After 12 months
- Impact factor: 2.6 (2025)

Standard abbreviations
- ISO 4: J. Clin. Pathol.

Indexing
- CODEN: JCPAAK
- ISSN: 0021-9746 (print); 1472-4146 (web)
- OCLC no.: 01680973

Links
- Journal homepage; Online access; Online archive

The Journal of Clinical Pathology (JCP) is a peer-reviewed medical journal covering all aspects of pathology, published by the BMJ Group and co-owned by the Association of Clinical Pathologists. Diagnostic and research areas covered include histopathology, virology, haematology, microbiology, cytopathology, chemical pathology, molecular pathology, forensic pathology, dermatopathology, neuropathology, and immunopathology. Each issue contains reviews, original articles, short reports, case reports, correspondence, and book reviews.

In 2005 the Journal of Clinical Pathology incorporated Molecular Pathology, which was published from 1995 to 2004.

== Indexing and impact ==
The journal is abstracted and indexed in Science Citation Index, Index Medicus (Medline), Scopus, Google Scholar and EMBASE/Excerpta Medica. According to the Journal Citation Reports, its 2023 impact factor is 2.5 ranking it 37th out of 88 journals in the category "Pathology"

The journal has been cited most often by the following journals Journal of Clinical Pathology, Histopathology, Archives of Pathology & Laboratory Medicine, Human Pathology, and the World Journal of Gastroenterology. The journals that have been cited most often by the Journal of Clinical Pathology are Journal of Clinical Pathology, American Journal of Surgical Pathology, Cancer, Cancer Research, and Modern Pathology.
