= Cristina Lo Celso =

Italian cell biologist

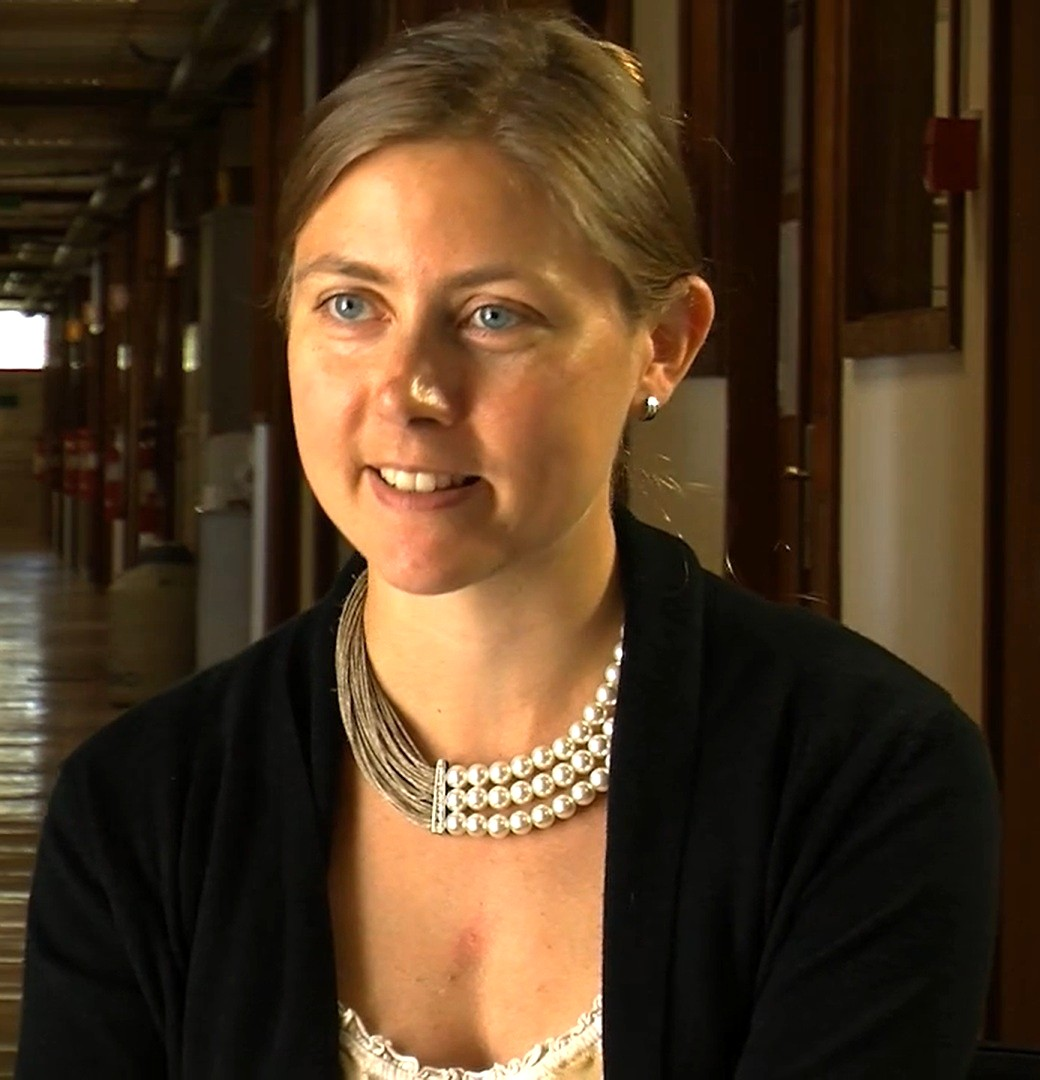
- Lo Celso in 2012
- Education: University College London; University of Turin
- Scientific career
- Workplaces: Imperial College London; Harvard University
- Thesis: Role of B-catenin signalling in adult epidermal cell fate specification (2005)

Cristina Lo Celso (born 1978) is an Italian cell biologist who is a professor at Imperial College London. Her research investigates the dynamic cellular processes that regulate hematopoietic stem cells in bone marrow. She was awarded the Royal Microscopical Society Life Sciences Medal in 2019, and was the first woman to win the Academy of Medical Sciences Foulkes Foundation Medal in 2017.

== Early life and education ==
Lo Celso spent her childhood in Turin. Her grandfather was a surgeon, who performed operations in extreme conditions during World War II. She studied at the University of Turin. She moved to University College London for doctoral research, and worked alongside Fiona Watt on epidermal stem cells supported by Cancer Research UK. Lo Celso moved to Harvard University for postdoctoral research, where she started studying hematopoietic stem cells. She developed first-of-their-kind microscopy techniques that permitted her to image living blood cells in their natural environment.

== Research and career ==
In 2009, Lo Celso established her research group at Imperial College London. She is interested in how leukaemia cells move around the body and how cells that promote bone growth disappear as leukaemia develops.

Lo Celso looks to understand the extrinsic regulation of haematopoietic stem cells (HSC), the stem cells that maintain red blood cell production. She is interested in how it changes between health and disease. She uses ex-vivo microscopy analysis to understand how HSCs localise and interact.

In 2017 Lo Celso was the first woman to win the Foulkes Medal in 2009.

== Awards and honours ==
- 2017: Academy of Medical Sciences Foulkes Medal
- 2017: Society for Hematology and Stem Cells New Investigator Award
- 2018: German Society of Cell Biology Carl Zeiss Lecture
- 2019: Royal Microscopical Society Life Sciences Medal
- 2025: Fellow of the Academy of Medical Sciences

== Selected publications ==
- Cristina Lo Celso; Heather E Fleming; Juwell W Wu; et al. (3 December 2008). "Live-animal tracking of individual haematopoietic stem/progenitor cells in their niche". Nature. 457 (7225): 92–96. doi:10.1038/nature07434. ISSN 1476-4687. PMC 2820276. PMID 19052546. Wikidata Q30493093.
- Heather E Fleming; Viktor Janzen; Cristina Lo Celso; Jun Guo; Kathleen M Leahy; Henry M Kronenberg; David T Scadden (1 March 2008). "Wnt signaling in the niche enforces hematopoietic stem cell quiescence and is necessary to preserve self-renewal in vivo". Cell Stem Cell. 2 (3): 274–283. doi:10.1016/j.stem.2008.01.003. ISSN 1934-5909. PMC 2991120. PMID 18371452. Wikidata Q34346883.
- Joji Fujisaki; Juwell Wu; Alicia L Carlson; et al. (8 June 2011). "In vivo imaging of Treg cells providing immune privilege to the haematopoietic stem-cell niche". Nature. 474 (7350): 216–219. doi:10.1038/nature10160. ISSN 1476-4687. PMC 3725645. PMID 21654805. Wikidata Q37051371.
