= Dominique Meyer (biologist) =

French biologist

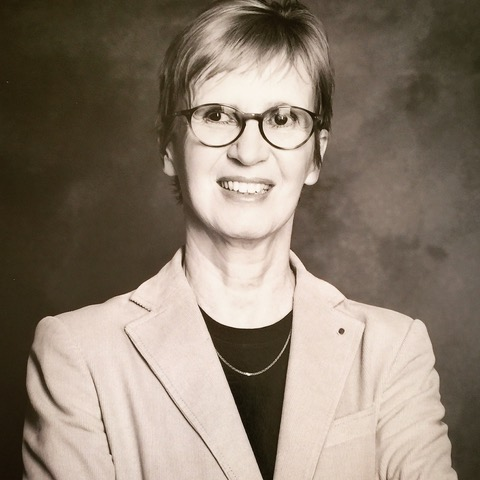
Dominique Meyer

Dominique Meyer (born 5 October 1939, in Gérardmer (Vosges)) is a French M.D. biologist and member of the French Academy of Sciences.

== Biography ==
Medical Doctor and researcher, she was both director of an Inserm research unit at Bicêtre Hospital and head of the biological hematology department at Antoine Béclère Hospital. She has done extensive work at the Scripps Research Institute in La Jolla, California and was President of the International Society on Thrombosis and Hemostasis from 1992 to 1994. She was President of the Scientific Council of the Fondation pour la Recherche Médicale, President of the Board of Directors of Inserm, Vice-president of the Board of Directors of the Institut Curie, Member of the Institut universitaire de France, Member of the Ethics Committee of the CNRS, Member of the Conseil Économique, Social et Environnemental (CESE) and Head of Scientific Information and Communication of the Académie des Sciences.

== Professional career ==
Dominique Meyer is currently professor emeritus of Hematology at the University of Paris XI, member of the Scientific Council of the Parliamentary Office for the Assessment of Scientific and Technological Choices (OPECST) and member of the Institut de France, whose Central Administrative Commission she chaired in 2019. Her world-renowned work has been devoted to the study of hemostasis and more specifically to the analysis of one of the proteins involved, von Willebrand factor, which is the central focus of her research on the molecular mechanisms that ensure a balance between bleeding and thrombosis.

== Publications ==
- On her research: more than 350 original articles and about fifty general reviews, book chapters or didactic articles. More than 300 communications presented at scientific conferences.

Her main scientific publications are:

- Meyer D., Jenkins C.-S., Dreyfus M., Larrieu M.-J. Experimental model for von Willebrand's disease. Nature (1973) 243, 293–294
- Mannucci, P.M., Meyer D., Ruggeri Z.M., Koutts J., Ciavarella N., Lavergne J.-M. Precipitating antibodies in von Willebrand's disease. Nature (1976) 262, 141–142
- Zimmerman T.S., Abildgaard C.F., Meyer D. The factor VIII abnormality in severe von Willebrand's disease. N. Engl. J. Med. (1979) 301, 1307–1310
- H.J. Weiss, D. Meyer, R. Rabinowitz, G. Pietu, J.-P. Girma, W.J. Vicic, J. Rogers. Pseudo-von Willebrand's disease. An intrinsic platelet defect with aggregation by unmodified human factor VIII/von Willebrand factor and enhanced adsorption of its high-molecular-weight multimers. N. Engl. J. Med. (1982) 306, 326–333
- Pietu G., Cherel G., Marguerie G., Meyer D. Inhibition of von Willebrand factor-platelet interaction by fibrinogen. Nature (1984) 308, 648–649
- Furlan M., Robles R., Affolter D., Meyer D., Baillod P., Lammle B. Triplet structure of von Willebrand factor reflects proteolytic degradation of high molecular weight multimers. Proc. Natl. Acad. Sci. USA (1993) 90, 7503–7507
- Meyer D., Fressinaud E., GaucherC., Lavergne J.-M., Hilbert L., Ribba A.S., Jorieux S., Mazurier C. Gene defects in 150 unrelated French cases with type 2 von Willebrand disease: from the patient to the gene. Thromb. Haemost. (1997) 78, 451–456
- Matshushita T., Meyer D., SadlerJ.E. Localization of von Willebrand factor-binding sites for platelet glycoprotein Ib and botrocetin by charged-to-alanine scanning mutagenesis. J. Biol. Chem. (2000) 275, 11044–11049
- - On climate, an article written with Robert Dautray: R Dautray and D Meyer. France and global climate change. Commentaire, 2011, 134, 397–404.

== Speeches ==
- Nature, a lesson of harmony, speech at the séance de rentrée of the Institut de France held on 26 October 2004 on the theme "Harmony "
- Academies in Europe in the 21st century: Memory, research and creation, speech at the meeting of European academies, at the Institut de France 21, 22 and 23 October 2007.
- Ten years of twinning between parliamentarians, members of the Académie des Sciences and young researchers, speech at the séance solennelle of the Académie des Sciences of the Institut de France held on 22 November 2016.

== Distinctions ==
=== Prizes ===
- Montyon Prize of the Académie des Sciences 1993.
- Claude Bernard Grand Prize of the City of Paris for medical research.
- Robert P. Grant Medal of the International Society on thrombosis and haemostasis.
- Research and Medicine Prize et the Institute of Health Sciences.

=== Decorations ===
- Chevalier on 28 March 1997, Officier on 13 July 2005 Commandeur on 13 July 2011 and Grand Officier on 13 July 2016 of the Légion d'Honneur.
- Officier on 14 November 2000 and Commandeur on 14 November 2008 of the Ordre national du Mérite.

Member of the Conseil de l'Ordre de la Légion d'Honneur from 2010 to 2016.
