= Jo Martin (pathologist) =

Pathologist

Joanne Martin CBE
- Education: Sidney Sussex College, Cambridge; University of London
- Scientific career
- Workplaces: Queen Mary University of London
- Website: Joanne Martin, MA (Cantab), MB, BS, PhD FRCPath

Joanne Elizabeth Martin CBE is National Specialty Advisor for Pathology to NHSEngland and Improvement, and Professor of Pathology at Queen Mary University of London. She was the President of the Royal College of Pathologists from November 2017 until November 2020.

Professor Martin qualified at Sidney Sussex College, Cambridge and the Royal London Hospital Medical College, and holds a master's degree in leadership in addition to a PhD from the University of London. She is a practising histopathologist, with a particular subspecialist expertise in neuromuscular disease of the gut and renal pathology. She was National Clinical Director for Pathology for NHS England from 2013 to 2016.

Martin was appointed Commander of the Order of the British Empire (CBE) in the 2022 Birthday Honours for services to the NHS and medical education.
