= Journal of Thrombosis and Haemostasis =

- Discipline: Hematology
- Language: English
- Edited by: Suzanne Cannegieter, Ton Lisman

Publication details
- History: 2003-present
- Publisher: Elsevier for the International Society on Thrombosis and Haemostasis
- Frequency: Monthly
- Impact factor: 5.2 (2025)

Standard abbreviations
- ISO 4: J. Thromb. Haemost.

Indexing
- ISSN: 1538-7933 (print); 1538-7836 (web)

Links
- Journal homepage; @Elsevier

The Journal of Thrombosis and Haemostasis is a monthly peer-reviewed medical journal covering research on thrombosis and hemostasis in general. It is published by Elsevier and the editors-in-chief are Suzanne Cannegieter and Ton Lisman. Former editors-in-chief include David Lillicrap, James Morrissey, Frits Rosendaal, Pieter Reitsma, Mike Greaves, David Lane, Pier Mannucci, Jos Vermylen, Jan Sixma, Francois Duckert, and Rosemary Biggs. It is an official journal of the International Society on Thrombosis and Haemostasis.

== Abstracting and indexing ==
According to the Journal Citation Reports, the journal has a 2025 impact factor of 5.2.
