= Dillwyn Williams =

British medical scientist

Professor Sir Dillwyn Williams FRCP FRCPath FMedSci FLSW

Professor of Histopathology, University of Cambridge
- In office 1992–1997

Professor of Pathology, Welsh National School of Medicine/University of Wales College of Medicine
- In office 1969–1992

Personal details
- Born: Edward Dillwyn Williams; 1 April 1929 (age 97)
- Occupation: Histopathologist

Sir Edward Dillwyn Williams (born 1 April 1929) is a British medical scientist and a Founding Fellow of the Learned Society of Wales.

Educational offices
Preceded by Dame Barbara Clayton	President of the Royal College of Pathologists; 1990 – 1993	Succeeded by Sir Peter Lachmann
