= Hagop Kantarjian =

- Medical career
- Profession: Medical Oncologist
- Field: Hematology and Oncology
- Institutions: The University of Texas MD Anderson Cancer Center
- Research: Leukemia
- Awards: David A. Karnofsky Memorial Award

Hagop Kantarjian is a hematologist and oncologist specializing in leukemia. He is a Professor and Chair of the Department of Leukemia at The University of Texas MD Anderson Cancer Center, where he holds the Samsung Distinguished Leukemia Chair in Cancer Medicine.

== Early life and education ==
Hagop Kantarjian was born in Beirut in 1954 to an Armenian family. He studied at the American University of Beirut (AUB), earning a Baccalaureate II in 1972, a Bachelor of Science degree in 1975, and a Doctor of Medicine (MD) degree in 1979. He completed his internship and residency in internal medicine at AUB before moving to the United States in 1981. He then pursued a fellowship in hematology and medical oncology at The University of Texas MD Anderson Cancer Center, completing his training in 1983.

== Career ==
In 1981, Hagop Kantarjian joined The University of Texas MD Anderson Cancer Center as a fellow in the Department of Developmental Therapeutics. He later held several academic positions, serving as a Faculty Associate in the Department of Hematology from 1983 to 1984, Assistant Professor from 1984 to 1988, and associate professor from 1988 to 1993. He was appointed the Kelcie Margaret Kana Research Chair in the Department of Leukemia, a position he held from 1998 to 2015.

Kantarjian has contributed to nearly 20 institutional committees at MD Anderson, serving in various roles, including chair, vice chair, and co-chair. He chaired the Subcommittee of the Faculty Achievement Award Parent Committee in 2000 and the Search Committee for the Department of Melanoma from 1999 to 2000. Additionally, he co-chaired the Promotion and Tenure Committee and served as Vice Chairman of the Surveillance Committee from 1995 to 1996.

Kantarjian is also a board director and secretary at Society of Hematologic Oncology.

He has also been actively involved with the American Society of Clinical Oncology (ASCO), serving on its Board of Directors from 2010 to 2015 and contributing to various committees, including the Cancer Communications Committee, Audit Committee, and the Education Subcommittee of the ASCO Board in 2015 and 2016. From 2013 to 2015, Kantarjian was a Fellow at Rice University's Baker Institute for Public Policy, where he contributed to health policy discussions.

== Work ==
Hagop Kantarjian's research has led to significant advancements in leukemia treatment, particularly in improving prognosis and survival rates for patients with chronic myeloid leukemia (CML) and acute lymphoblastic leukemia (ALL). His work contributed to the development of targeted therapies, including tyrosine kinase inhibitors such as imatinib, dasatinib, nilotinib, and bosutinib, which have increased 10-year survival rates for CML from 20% to 90%. He also played a key role in developing the HYPER-CVAD regimen for ALL, replacing radiation therapy with spinal fluid chemotherapy to prevent central nervous system involvement.

Kantarjian has been instrumental in the development and FDA approval of several leukemia treatments, including decitabine and clofarabine for myelodysplastic syndromes and leukemia. He has authored over 2,400 peer-reviewed publications and contributed to the approval of more than 20 leukemia drugs, including hypomethylating agents (HMAs) combined with venetoclax for older and unfit patients with acute myeloid leukemia (AML). His research has also advanced the use of FLT3 inhibitors, IDH inhibitors, and monoclonal antibodies such as inotuzumab and blinatumomab in the treatment of ALL.

== Selected publications ==
- Kantarjian, Hagop; Sawyers, Charles; Hochhaus, Andreas; Guilhot, Francois; Schiffer, Charles; Gambacorti-Passerini, Carlo; Niederwieser, Dietger; Resta, Debra; Capdeville, Renaud; Zoellner, Ulrike; Talpaz, Moshe; Druker, Brian (2002-02-28). "Hematologic and Cytogenetic Responses to Imatinib Mesylate in Chronic Myelogenous Leukemia". New England Journal of Medicine. 346 (9): 645–652. doi:10.1056/NEJMoa011573. ISSN 0028-4793. PMID 11870241.
- Kantarjian, Hagop; Stein, Anthony; Gökbuget, Nicola; Fielding, Adele K.; Schuh, Andre C.; Ribera, Josep-Maria; Wei, Andrew; Dombret, Hervé; Foà, Robin; Bassan, Renato; Arslan, Önder; Sanz, Miguel A.; Bergeron, Julie; Demirkan, Fatih; Lech-Maranda, Ewa (2017-03-02). "Blinatumomab versus Chemotherapy for Advanced Acute Lymphoblastic Leukemia". New England Journal of Medicine. 376 (9): 836–847. doi:10.1056/NEJMoa1609783. ISSN 0028-4793. PMC 5881572. PMID 28249141.
- Kantarjian, Hagop; Shah, Neil P.; Hochhaus, Andreas; Cortes, Jorge; Shah, Sandip; Ayala, Manuel; Moiraghi, Beatriz; Shen, Zhixiang; Mayer, Jiri; Pasquini, Ricardo; Nakamae, Hirohisa; Huguet, Françoise; Boqué, Concepción; Chuah, Charles; Bleickardt, Eric (2010-06-17). "Dasatinib versus Imatinib in Newly Diagnosed Chronic-Phase Chronic Myeloid Leukemia". New England Journal of Medicine. 362 (24): 2260–2270. doi:10.1056/NEJMoa1002315. ISSN 0028-4793. PMID 20525995.

== Honors and awards ==
- David A. Karnofsky Memorial Award by ASCO (2023)
- Honorary Doctorate, Yerevan State Medical University (2017)
- Giants of Cancer Care Award, OncLive
- Thomson Reuters Highly Cited Researcher
- Joseph H. Burchenal Memorial Award, AACR (2013)
