= William Klyne =

Organic chemist

William Klyne (March 23, 1913, in Enfield, Middlesex – November 13, 1977) was an organic chemist known for his work in steroids and stereochemistry — a field in which he was a "pioneer", and in which Ernest Eliel and Norman Allinger described him as "one of the world's experts".

In 1946, he gained a PhD from the University of Edinburgh with a thesis entitled “The steroid sulphates: studies on the conjugated sulphates of mare’s pregnancy urine".

Klyne taught at Westfield College, University of London, where he served as dean of science from 1971 to 1973, and as vice-principal from 1973 to 1976. He also served on the editorial board of the Biochemical Society from 1950 to 1955, and on IUPAC's nomenclature committee from 1971 until his death. As well, he established and maintained the Medical Research Council's Steroid Reference Collection, and wrote several textbooks, including The Chemistry of Steroids (1957) and Atlas of Stereochemical Correlations (1974).

== Personal life ==
Klyne met Barbara Clayton in 1947 while both were employed at the Medical Research Council; they married in 1949.

== See also ==
- Klyne–Prelog system
- Ultraviolet–visible spectroscopy of stereoisomers
