= Royal College of Pathologists =

UK-based professional regulatory body

- Established: 1962; 64 years ago
- Type: Medical royal college
- Headquarters: Alie Street, London
- President: Dr Bernie Croal
- Affiliations: Academy of Medical Royal Colleges
- Website: www.rcpath.org

The Royal College of Pathologists (RCPath) is a professional membership organisation. Its main function is the overseeing of postgraduate training, and its Fellowship Examination (FRCPath) is recognised as the standard assessment of fitness to practise in this branch of medicine.

== Constitution ==
The Royal College of Pathologists is a professional membership organisation, to maintain the standards and reputation of British pathology, through training, assessments, examinations and professional development. It is a registered charity and is not a trade union. Its 13,000 members work in hospital laboratories, universities and industry worldwide.

== History ==
The College of Pathologists was founded in 1962, to optimise postgraduate training in the relatively young science of pathology, with its high importance in the diagnostic process, and the increasing range of specialist studies within it. The college received its royal charter in 1970 and its Patron is King Charles III.

== Training and examinations ==
The Fellowship Examination of the Royal College of Pathologists (FRCPath) is the main method of assessment for UK pathology training - evaluation of a candidate's training programme, indicating fitness to practise, whilst also marking the entry into independent practice and the beginning of continuing professional development. Upon successful completion, trainees are awarded Fellowship status of the Royal College of Pathologists.

Fellowship may also be awarded on the basis of submitted published works, though this does not contribute to the award of the Certificate of Completion of Training and is not a mark of eligibility for appointment to a Consultant post or unsupervised practice.

The College runs a national scheme for overseeing of continued education of pathologists in clinical practice, as well as sponsoring workshops, lectures and courses.

== Disciplines ==
The following are disciplines of pathology which the college oversees:

- Histopathology
  - Neuropathology
  - Cytopathology
  - Paediatric pathology
- Forensic Pathology
- Clinical Biochemistry, sometimes called Chemical Pathology
- Haematology (with the Royal College of Physicians)
- Transfusion Science (as part of the Higher Specialist Scientific Training (HSST) Programme)
- Immunology (with the Royal College of Physicians)
- The work of coroners
- Medical Microbiology (with the Royal College of Physicians, as Combined Infection Training)
- Virology (with the Royal College of Physicians, as Combined Infection Training)
- Veterinary Pathology
- Genetics (both Clinical Cytogenetics and Molecular Genetics)
- Oral and Maxillofacial Pathology
- Toxicology
- Clinical Embryology

== Publications ==
The Royal College of Pathologists produces The Bulletin of The Royal College of Pathologists, a quarterly professional membership magazine.

== Presidents ==
- Dr Bernie Croal 2023-
- Professor Michael Osborn 2020–2023
- Professor Joanne Martin 2017–2020
- Dr Suzannah Lishman 2014–2017
- Dr Archie Prentice 2011–2014
- Professor Peter Furness 2008–2011
- Professor Adrian Newland 2005–2008
- Professor Sir James Underwood 2002–2005
- Professor Sir John Lilleyman 1999–2002
- Professor Sir Roderick MacSween 1996–1999
- Professor Alastair Bellingham 1993–1996
- Professor Sir Peter Lachmann 1990–1993
- Professor Sir Dillwyn Williams 1987–1990
- Professor Dame Barbara Clayton 1984–1987
- Professor Robert Curran 1981–1984
- Professor John Anderson 1978–1981
- Sir Robert Williams 1975–1978
- Sir John Dacie 1972–1975
- Sir Theo Crawford 1969–1972
- Sir James Howie 1966–1969
- Sir Roy Cameron 1962–1966

== Arms ==
Coat of arms of Royal College of Pathologists
Notes 1 July 1964 Crest On a wreath of the colours in front of a sprig of logwood leaved and fructed Proper an antique microscope Proper. Escutcheon Sable surmounting an open book a rod of Aesculapius Proper the serpent Or on a chief Argent a bar wavy Gules between in chief two torteaux and in base a benzene ring Sable.
