= Histopathology (journal) =

- Discipline: Pathology
- Language: English
- Edited by: Roger Feakins

Publication details
- History: 1977-present
- Publisher: Wiley-Blackwell
- Frequency: Monthly
- Impact factor: 7.778 (2021)

Standard abbreviations
- ISO 4: Histopathology

Indexing
- CODEN: HISTDD
- ISSN: 0309-0167 (print); 1365-2559 (web)
- OCLC no.: 03146859

Links
- Journal homepage; Online access; Online archive

Histopathology is a monthly peer-reviewed medical journal covering diagnostic, research, and surgical pathology. It was established in 1977 and is published by Wiley-Blackwell. The editor-in-chief is Roger Feakins.
