= British Journal of Haematology =

- Discipline: Hematology
- Language: English
- Edited by: John Barrett

Publication details
- History: 1955–present
- Publisher: [Wiley] (United Kingdom)
- Frequency: 23/year
- Impact factor: 8.615 (2021)

Standard abbreviations
- ISO 4: Br. J. Haematol.

Indexing
- CODEN: BJHEAL
- ISSN: 0007-1048 (print); 1365-2141 (web)
- LCCN: 85001046 sc 85001046
- OCLC no.: 1537286

Links
- Journal homepage; Online access; Online archive

The British Journal of Haematology is a peer-reviewed medical journal focusing on hematology and other blood-related topics, such as blood diseases and their treatment. It is published by [Wiley] on behalf of the British Society for Haematology.

== Indexing ==
According to the Journal Citation Reports, the British Journal of Haematology had a 2016 impact factor of 5.67, ranking it 10th out of 70 in the category "Hematology". In addition, the journal is indexed in:

- Abstracts in Anthropology
- Academic Search
- ADONIS
- Biological Abstracts
- BIOSIS Previews
- CAB Abstracts
- CAB Health
- CAB Direct database
- Chemical Abstracts Service
- CSA Biological Sciences Database
- CSA Environmental Sciences & Pollution Management Database
- CSA Immunological Abstracts
- CSA Microbiology Databases
- Current Contents/Clinical Medicine
- Elsevier BIOBASE
- EMBASE/Excerpta Medica
- EORTC
- Health Source Nursing/Academic
- International Bibliographic Information on Dietary Supplements
- Index Medicus/MEDLINE
- Leisure Recreation and Tourism Abstracts
- LEIsure Tourism Database
- PubMed
- Protozoological Abstracts
- Review of Medical and Veterinary Mycology
- Science Citation Index
- VINITI Database RAS
