= Surgeon =

Physician with surgical specialty

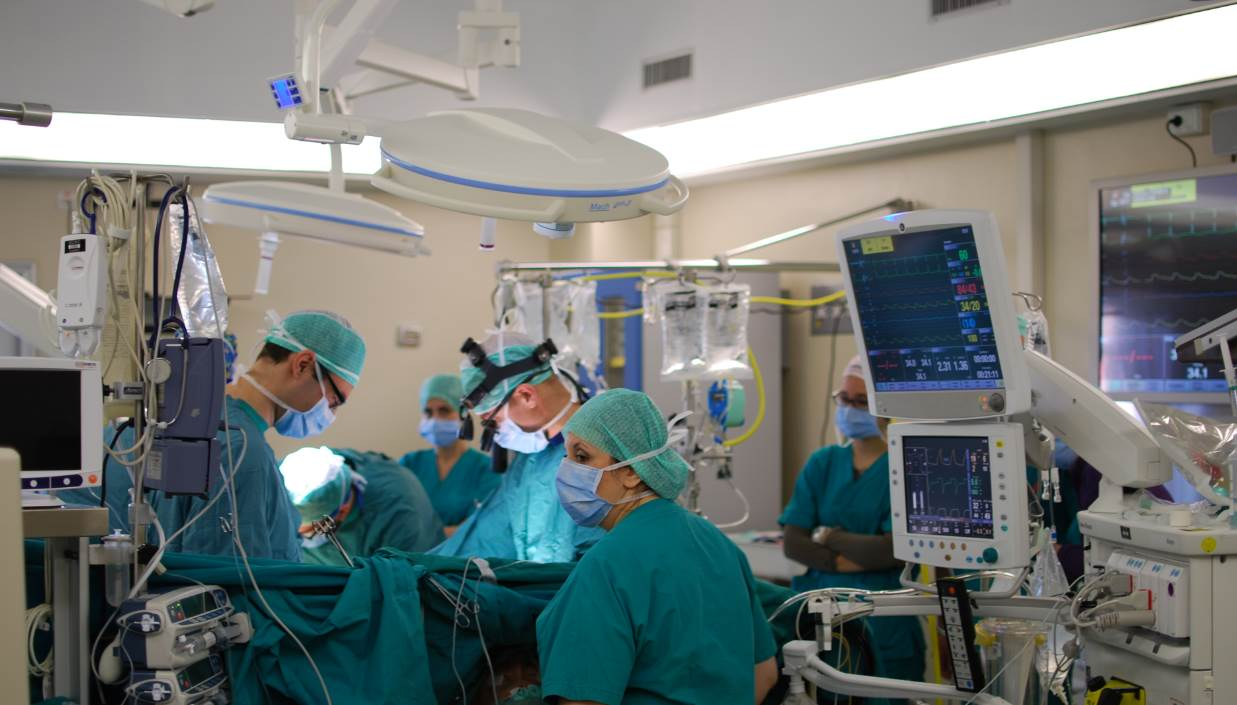
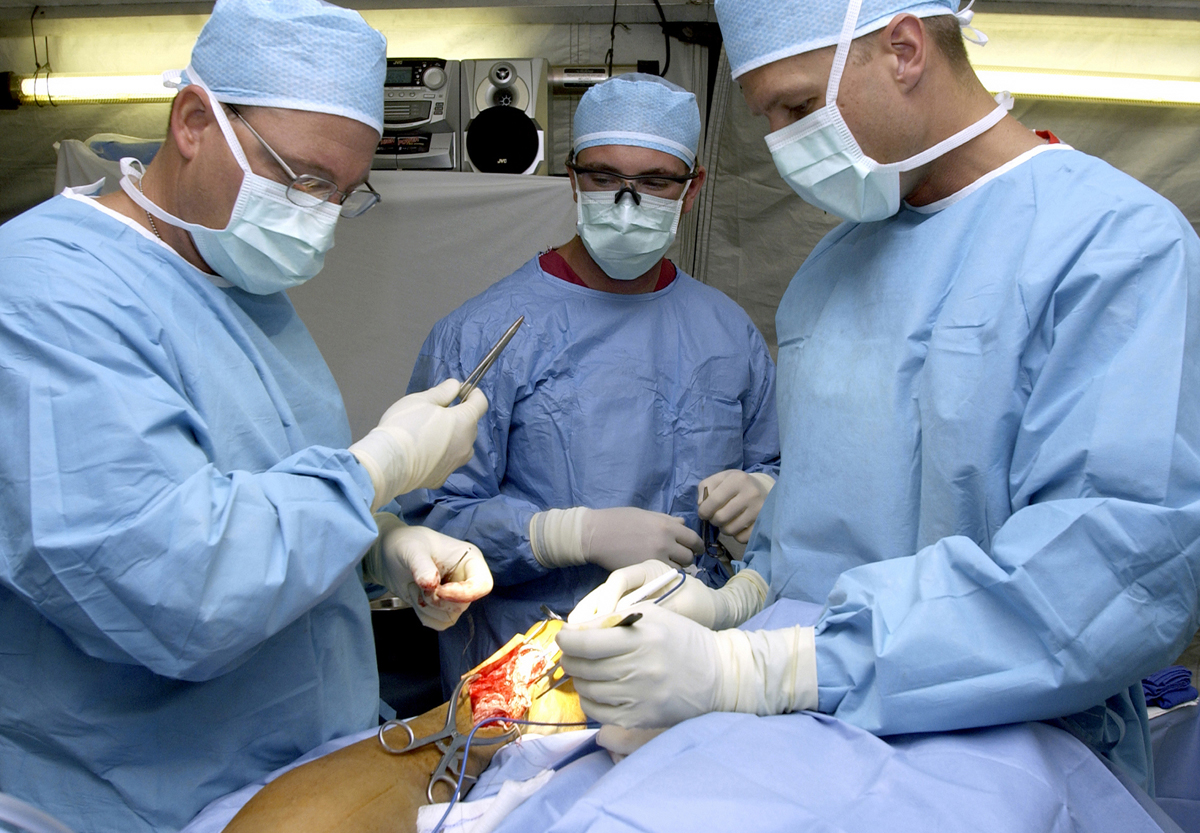
Surgeons performing operations

Surgeons per 100000

In medicine, a surgeon is a medical doctor who performs surgery. Even though there are different traditions in different times and places, a modern surgeon is a licensed physician and received the same medical training as physicians before specializing in surgery.

In some countries and jurisdictions, the title of 'surgeon' is restricted to maintain the integrity of the craft group in the medical profession. A specialist regarded as a legally recognized surgeon includes podiatry, dentistry, and veterinary medicine. It is estimated that surgeons perform over 300 million surgical procedures globally each year.

== History ==
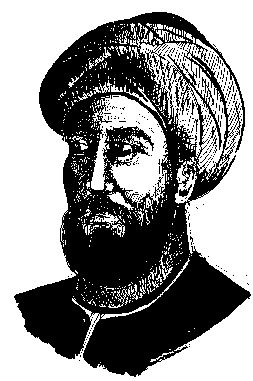
Al-Zahrawi, the Islamic Golden Age physician widely considered one of the '"Fathers of Modern Surgery"

The first person to document a surgery was the 6th century BC Indian physician-surgeon, Sushruta. He specialized in cosmetic plastic surgery and even documented an open rhinoplasty procedure. His magnum opus Suśruta-saṃhitā is one of the most important surviving ancient treatises on medicine and is considered a foundational text of both Ayurveda and surgery. The treatise addresses all aspects of general medicine, but the translator G. D. Singhal dubbed Sushruta "the father of surgical intervention" on account of the extraordinarily accurate and detailed accounts of surgery to be found in the work.

After the eventual decline of the Sushruta School of Medicine in India, surgery was largely ignored until the Islamic Golden Age surgeon Al-Zahrawi (936–1013) re-established surgery as an effective medical practice. He is considered the greatest medieval surgeon to have appeared from the Islamic World, and has also been described as the father of surgery. His greatest contribution to medicine is the Kitab al-Tasrif, a thirty-volume encyclopedia of medical practices. He was the first physician to describe an ectopic pregnancy, and the first physician to identify the hereditary nature of haemophilia.

His pioneering contributions to the field of surgical procedures and instruments had an enormous impact on surgery but it was not until the 18th century that surgery emerged as a distinct medical discipline in England.

In Europe, surgery was mostly associated with barber-surgeons who also used their hair-cutting tools to undertake surgical procedures, often at the battlefield and also for their employers. With advances in medicine and physiology, the professions of barbers and surgeons diverged; by the 19th century barber-surgeons had virtually disappeared, and surgeons were almost invariably qualified doctors who had specialized in surgery. Surgeon continued, however, to be used as the title for military medical officers until the end of the 19th century, and the title of Surgeon General continues to exist for both senior military medical officers and senior government public health officers.

== Titles in the Commonwealth ==
In 1950, the Royal College of Surgeons of England (RCS) in London began to offer surgeons a formal status via RCS membership. The title Mister became a badge of honour, and today, in many Commonwealth countries, a qualified doctor who, after at least four years' training, obtains a surgical qualification (formerly Fellow of the Royal College of Surgeons, but now also Member of the Royal College of Surgeons or a number of other diplomas) is given the honour of being allowed to revert to calling themselves Mr, Miss, Mrs or Ms in the course of their professional practice, but this time the meaning is different. It is sometimes assumed that the change of title implies consultant status (and some mistakenly think non-surgical consultants are Mr too), but the length of postgraduate medical training outside North America is such that a qualified surgeon may be years away from obtaining such a post: many doctors previously obtained these qualifications in the senior house officer grade, and remained in that grade when they began sub-speciality training. The distinction of Mr (etc.) is also used by surgeons in the Republic of Ireland, some states of Australia, Barbados, New Zealand, South Africa, Zimbabwe, and some other Commonwealth countries. In August 2021, the Royal Australasian College of Surgeons announced that it was advocating for this practice to be phased out and began encouraging the use of the gender neutral title Dr or appropriate academic titles such as Professor.

The reason for the otherwise undistinguished title of "mister" is historical. In the 18th century only physicians, with an MD degree, were entitled to call themselves "doctor". Most surgeons did not have a degree—in the Middle Ages they were also barbers, expert users of cutting tools—and were considered inferior and subordinate to physicians; "Mr" was initially a lower honorific, but came to be a badge of honour.

== Military titles ==
In many English-speaking countries the military title of surgeon is applied to any medical practitioner, due to the historical evolution of the term. The US Army Medical Corps retains various surgeon United States military occupation codes in the ranks of officer pay grades, for military personnel dedicated to performing surgery on wounded soldiers.

== Specialties ==
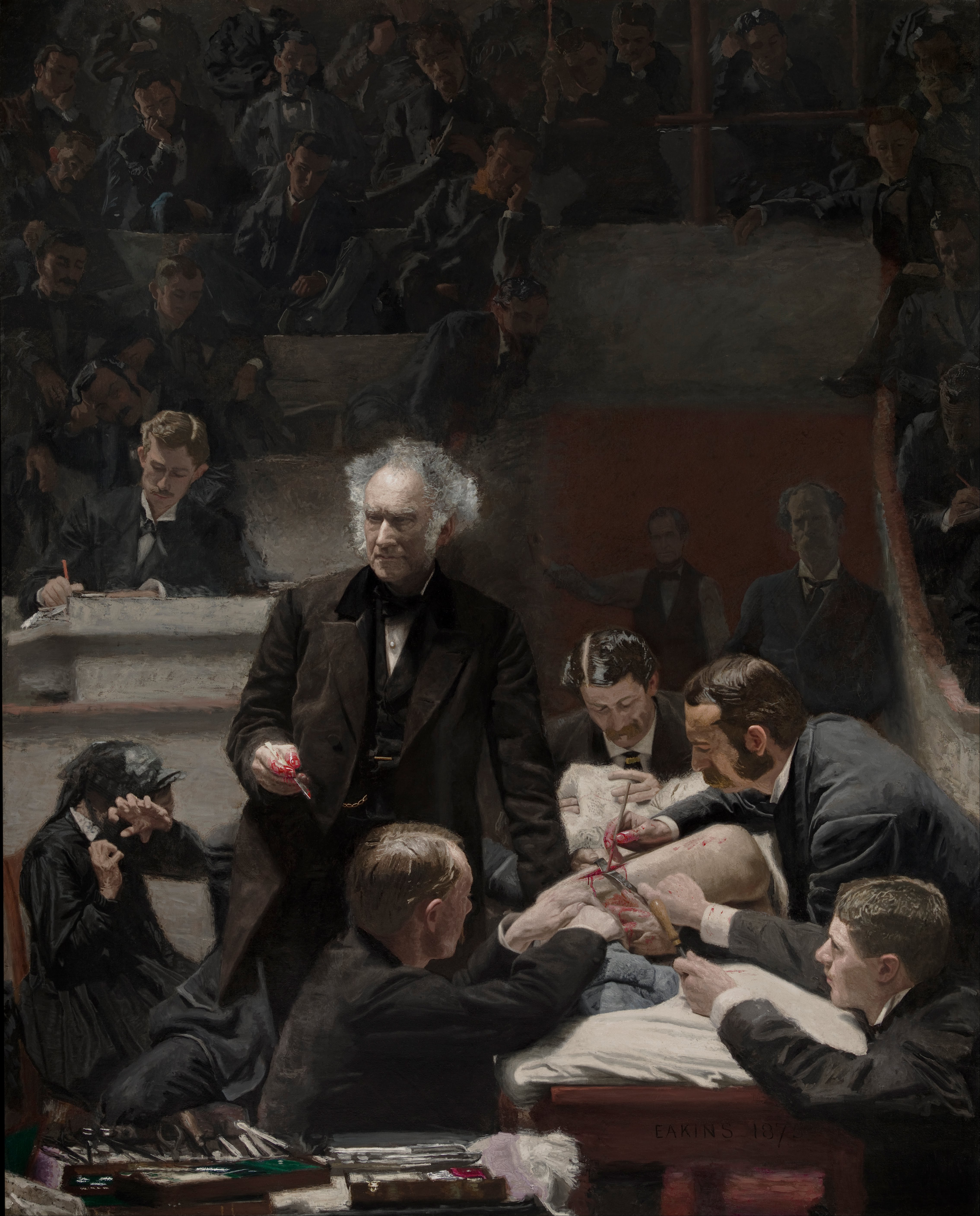
The Gross Clinic, 1875, Philadelphia Museum of Art and the Pennsylvania Academy of Fine Arts

- Cardiothoracic surgery
- Colorectal surgery
- Craniofacial surgery
- Dental surgery
- Endocrine surgery
- General surgery
- Neurological surgery
- Obstetrics and gynaecology
- Ophthalmology
- Oral and maxillofacial surgery
- Orthopedic surgery
- Otorhinolaryngology
- Pediatric surgery
- Plastic surgery
- Podiatric surgery
- Surgical oncology
- Thoracic surgery (in the United States considered part of cardiothoracic surgery)
- Transplant surgery
- Trauma surgery
- Upper gastrointestinal surgery
- Urology
- Vascular surgery

Some physicians who are general practitioners or specialists in family medicine or emergency medicine may perform limited ranges of minor, common, or emergency surgery. Anesthesia often accompanies surgery, and anesthesiologists and nurse anesthetists may oversee this aspect of surgery. Surgeon's assistant, surgical nurses, surgical technologists are trained professionals who support surgeons.

In the United States, the Department of Labor description of a surgeon is "a physician who treats diseases, injuries, and deformities by invasive, minimally-invasive, or non-invasive surgical methods, such as using instruments, appliances, or by manual manipulation".

Around the world, the array of 'surgical' pathology that a surgeon manages does not always require surgical methods. For example, surgeons treat diverticulitis conservatively using antibiotics and bowel rest. In some cases of small bowel obstruction, particularly where a patient has had previous abdominal surgery, the surgeon treats the patient with fluid resuscitation, nasogastric decompression of the stomach, which gives rise to resolution of the intestinal obstruction in cases where adhesions are the aetiology of the obstruction. The same is true for other craft groups in surgery.

== Pioneer surgeons ==
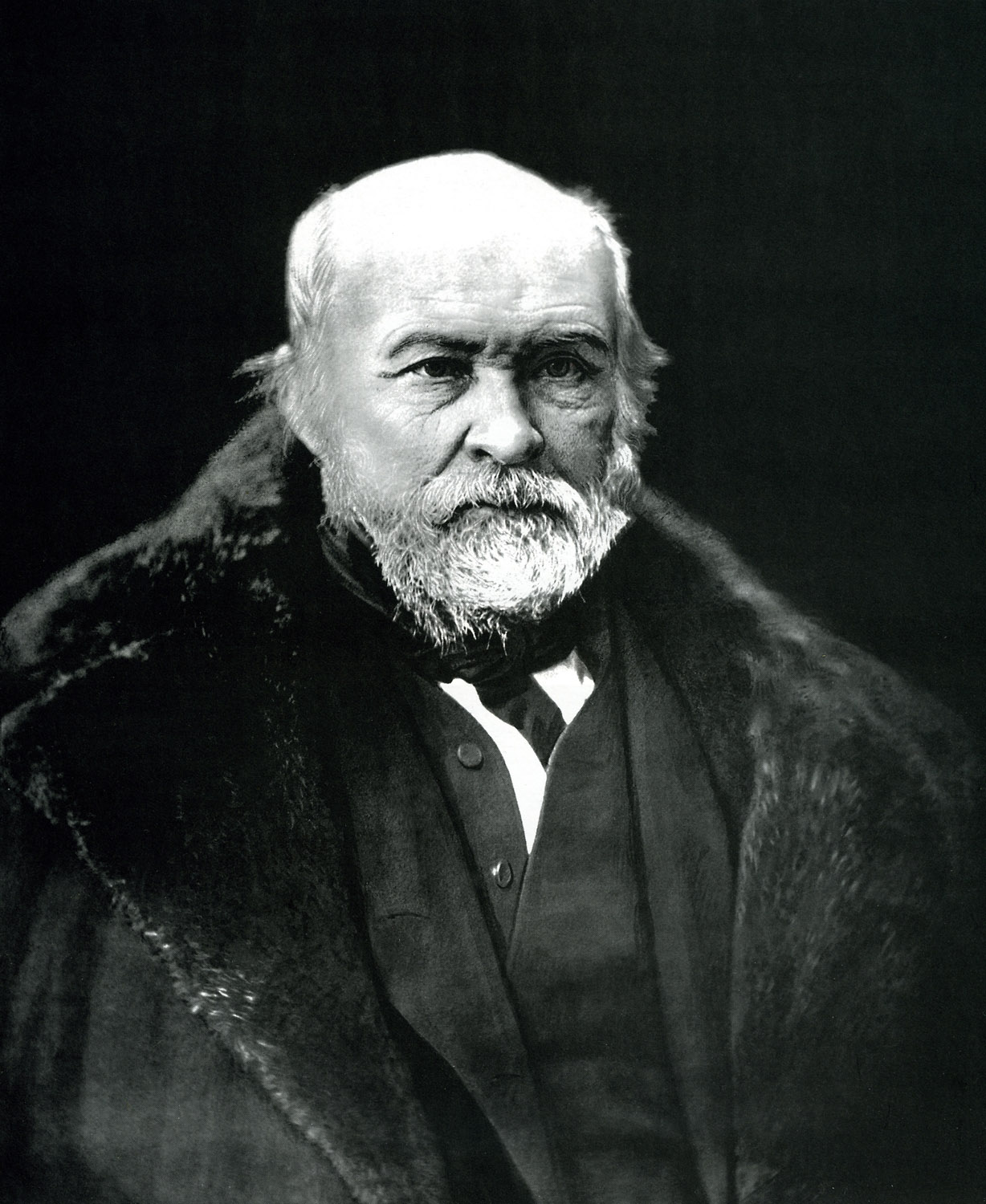
Russian surgeon Nikolay Pirogov – a pioneer of field surgery

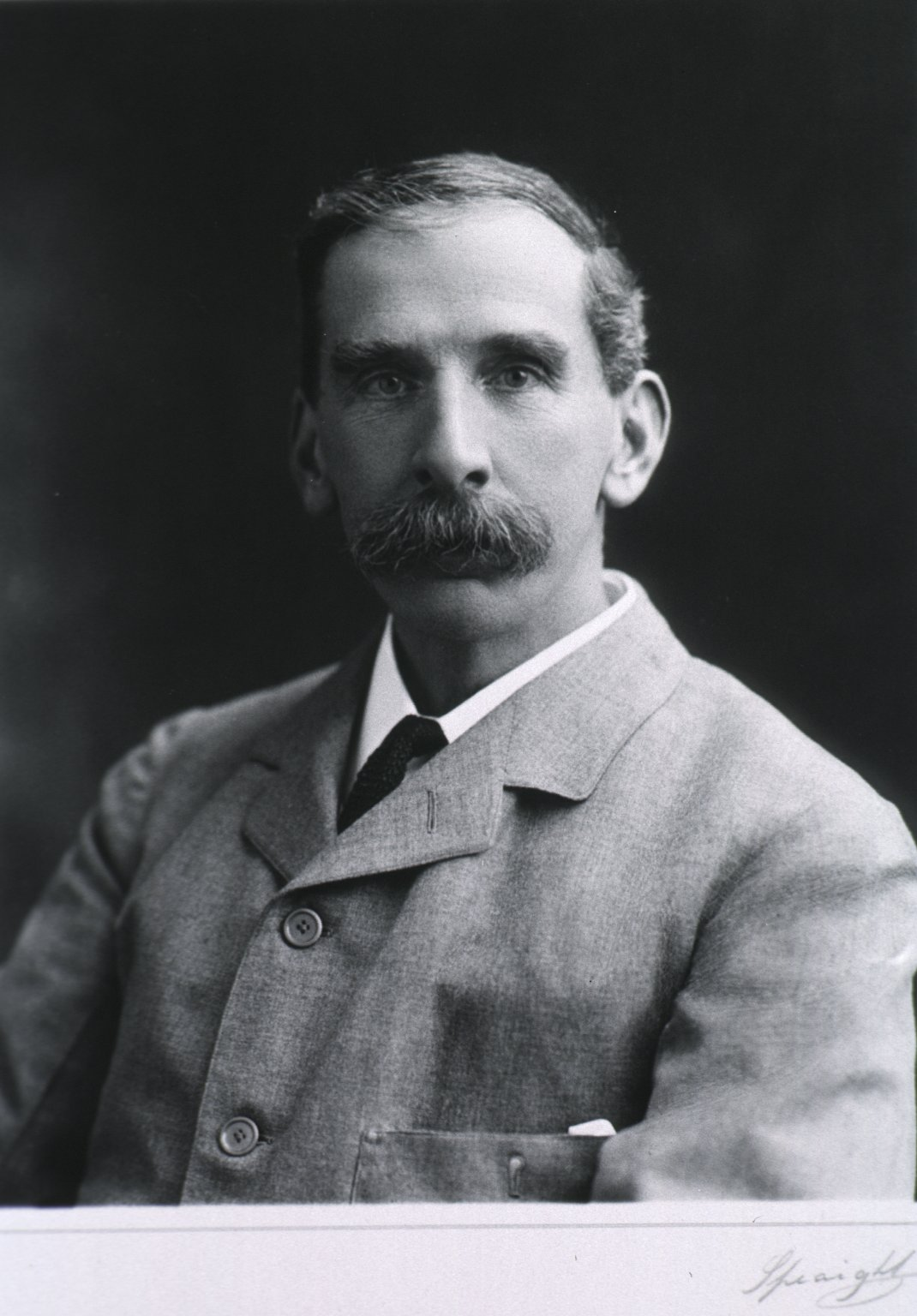
Victor Horsley pioneered neurosurgery

- Christiaan Barnard (cardiac surgery, first heart transplantation)
- Alfred Blalock (first modern day successful open heart surgery in 1944)
- Nina Starr Braunwald (First female cardiac surgeon)
- Dorothy-Laviania Brown (First female African-American surgeon)
- Victor Chang Australian pioneer of heart transplantation
- Harvey Cushing (pioneer, and often considered the father of, modern neurosurgery)
- Eleanor Davies-Colley (surgeon and founder of the South London Hospital for Women and Children)
- Michael DeBakey (educator and innovator in the field of cardiac surgery)
- René Favaloro (first surgeon to perform bypass surgery)
- Svyatoslav Fyodorov (creator of radial keratotomy)
- Harold Gillies (pioneer of plastic surgery)
- Jesse Gray (First female chief of surgery at Hopkinz Hospital)
- William Stewart Halsted (initiated surgical residency training in U.S., pioneer in many fields)
- Michael R. Harrison (pioneer of fetal surgery)
- Sir Victor Horsley (neurosurgery)
- John Hunter (Scottish, viewed as the father of modern surgery, performed hundreds of dissections, served as the model for Dr. Jekyll.)
- Gavriil Ilizarov, inventor of the Ilizarov apparatus for lengthening limb bones and for the method of surgery named after him, the Ilizarov surgery
- Charles Kelman (Invented phacoemulsification, the technique of modern cataract surgery)
- Lars Leksell (neurosurgery, inventor of radiosurgery)
- C. Walton Lillehei (labeled "Father of modern day open heart surgery")
- Joseph Lister (discoverer of surgical sepsis, Listerine named in his honour)
- B. K. Misra – first neurosurgeon in the world to perform image-guided surgery for aneurysms, first in South Asia to perform stereotactic radiosurgery, first in India to perform awake craniotomy and laparoscopic spine surgery.
- Ioannis Pallikaris (Greek surgeon. Performed the first LASIK procedure on a human eye. Developed Epi-LASIK.)
- Fidel Pagés (pioneer of epidural anesthesia)
- Wilder Penfield (neurosurgery)
- Gholam A. Peyman (inventor of LASIK,)
- Nikolay Pirogov (the founder of field surgery)
- Jennie Simile Robertson (first female surgeon in Canada)
- Valery Shumakov (pioneer of artificial organs implantation)
- Maria Siemionow (pioneer of near-total face transplant surgery)
- Thomas E. Starzl (pioneer of the development of liver transplantations)
- Sushruta (the first to document an operation of open rhinoplasty)
- Paul Tessier (French surgeon in Craniofacial surgery)
- Mary Edwards Walker (first female surgeon in the United States)
- Gazi Yasargil (Turkish neurosurgeon, founder of microneurosurgery)
- al-Zahrawi, regarded as one of the greatest medieval surgeons and a father of surgery.

== Organizations and fellowships ==
- ACFAS
- FACS
- FRACDS
- FRACS
- FRCS
- FRCS (Canada)
- FRCS (Edinburgh)
- FRCSI (Ireland)
- MRCS
