= History of medical diagnosis =

The history of medical diagnosis began in earnest from the days of Imhotep in ancient Egypt and Hippocrates in ancient Greece but is far from perfect despite the enormous bounty of information made available by medical research including the sequencing of the human genome. The practice of diagnosis continues to be dominated by theories set down in the early 20th century.

== Antiquity ==
=== Ancient Egypt ===
An Egyptian medical textbook, the Edwin Smith Papyrus written by Imhotep (fl. 2630-2611 Before Christ), was the first to apply the method of diagnosis to the treatment of disease. Physicians in Ancient Egypt were only able to come up with diagnostics based on symptoms, no tests were being run. Most physicians in this time had the ability to identify problems with the digestive tract, cardiovascular system, spleen, liver, and menstrual cycle; However, the top tier medical treatments, and physicians were only used for royalty and wealthy Egyptians.

The first type of modern medical care has been found in Ancient Egypt (3300BCE to 525BCE). Ancient Egyptians believed that the relationship a person has with the universe determines their health. Hence, they did not make a significant difference between medicine and magic, Ebers Papyrus implemented the basic concept of health and disease, which says that the body has twenty-two mtw (vessels) that connect to the body with essential substances like semen, mucus, tears, air and blood.

=== Ancient Babylonia ===
A Babylonian medical textbook, the Diagnostic Handbook written by Esagil-kin-apli (fl. 1069-1046 BC), introduced the use of empiricism, logic and rationality in the diagnosis of an illness or disease. The book made use of logical rules in combining observed symptoms on the body of a patient with its diagnosis and prognosis. He described the symptoms for many varieties of epilepsy and related ailments along with their diagnosis and prognosis which both played significant roles in the practice of Babylonian medicine. (Note: Ginzburg (1984) stresses the significance of Babylonian medicine in his discussion of the conjectural paradigm as evidenced by the methods of Giovanni Morelli, Sigmund Freud and Sherlock Holmes in the light of Charles Sanders Peirce's logic of making good guesses or abductive reasoning.)

Babylonian physicians had to pay very close attention to the patient and every sign that their body produced that could be relevant to the illness. They were very keen on the temperature of the body. Physicians could only tell temperature based on the feel of it. They had multitudes of classifications for each slightly different increase and decrease in the patient's fever and how they should treat that person. Another way they were able to diagnosis problems was by looking at every possible afflicted area. They made great contributions to diagnosing problems such as pneumonia by observing the throat and phlegm of the affected person.

=== Ancient China ===
Predated by Babylonian and Egyptian medicine, traditional Chinese medicine (TCM) was described in an ancient Chinese text, the Yellow Emperor's Inner Canon or Huangdi Neijing which dates to the first or second century BCE. The four diagnostic methods of TCM which are still being practiced today are inspection, listening and smelling, inquiry and palpation.

=== Ancient Greece ===
Over two thousand years ago, Hippocrates recorded the association between disease and heredity. In similar fashion, Pythagoras noted the association between metabolism and heredity (allergy to Fava beans). The medical community, however, has only recently acknowledged the importance of genetics and its relevance to mainstream medicine.

The Hippocratic practices have continued to be crucial for typical medical procedures, bedside manners, and patient care. Hippocrates had a method that he used continually in order to gain a better understanding of each of his patient's medical issues, and what should be done to help them be cured. A portion of Hippocrates' methods for medical diagnosis was that he made sure to understand and carefully listen to what the patient was telling him about their physical and/or mental conditions, as well as their history of events that led them to eventually being in his care. In addition to gathering patient information and history, Hippocrates also carefully observed the four liquids of blood, phlegm, yellow bile, and black bile to help him continue his diagnosis procedures. The Hippocratic methods are largely responsible for several different medical attributes, in regard to patient care and patient health. For example, Hippocrates emphasized the priority that the physician should keep, which is making sure their patient is healthy. This was a monumental step in medical practices because it was not as common of a practice in ancient medicine as it should have been. The steps that Hippocrates emphasized have been translated into modern medicine and the processes that are done in order to understand the patient's condition and continue with making an official diagnosis. Aside from his major contribution to the process of diagnosing a patient, Hippocrates' methods have also been crucial for setting a high standard for the way in which a patient should be treated by their physician.

While Pythagoras might not have contributed as much to medical diagnosis and the procedural concepts that go into it, he contributed largely to other crucial aspects that have helped the medical field exponentially. The main example of how Pythagoras made large medical contributions with his observations is in regard to his studies with fava beans. In this experiment, Pythagoras discovered how while some people can eat fava beans and have no reaction whatsoever, other people can eat them and it can cause a possibly fatal reaction—regardless of how healthy both individuals were before eating the fava beans. With this experiment, Pythagoras' discoveries were able to be used as the building blocks for scientists to have a better understanding on how genotype can affect how different people react to different foods or substances. During Pythagoras' time, the only real way he was able to make his conclusions was due to naked eye observations. However, with the large advancements that have been made in technology, modern day scientists have been able to look more thoroughly into the details of Pythagoras' findings. For example, researchers have been able to pinpoint that those who had fatal reactions in Pythagoras' fava beans experiment likely had a G6PD deficiency, which can lead to hemolysis in the individuals who ingest fava beans and have that specific deficiency. Without Pythagoras observations from his experiment, modern day research would not have had the early basis for genetic research and theories.

=== Ancient Colombia ===
Pre-Columbian medicine has been found in Mesoamerican cultures that started in the year 1,500 BC and ended due to the Spanish conquerors in 1521. Mesoamerican cultures existed before the Mayans or Toltecs and there Mesoamerican medicine was used by many cultures afterwards. Bernardino de Sahagun, Francisco Hernandez, and the Cruz-Badiano codex recovered the history of medical diagnosis. They mainly used plants and herbs to treat diseases. Through advancing with time they later on used a difficult and philphically medical treatment theory that is based on religion, astronomy, divination and the polarity. The Mesoamerican cultures believed early on that every culture was able to treat any disease and find a cure for it by just simply understanding the meaning and origin of it.

== Middle Ages ==
=== Islamic World ===
The Arabic physician, Abu al-Qasim al-Zahrawi (Abulcasis), wrote on hematology in his Al-Tasrif (1000). He provided the first description on haemophilia, a hereditary genetic disorder, in which he wrote of an Andalusian family whose males died of bleeding after minor injuries.

The Persian physician, Ibn Sina (Avicenna, 980–1037), in The Canon of Medicine (1025), pioneered the idea of a syndrome in the diagnosis of specific diseases.

In The Canon of Medicine, Avicenna wrote a total of five sections. The first book contained subjects such as functions of the human body, understanding symptoms and what causes them, and how to classify the diseases. The second book lists the different medicines used at the time. The third book made some big additions to what was known at the time about different ailments in ones head, including migraines and many others. In the fourth book, Avicenna wrote about what information he gathered pertaining to illnesses within the body, such as fevers and stomach problems. Lastly, his fifth book in The Canon of Medicine was about different remedies for illnesses and which ingredients were needed to concoct them.

=== Medieval Europe ===
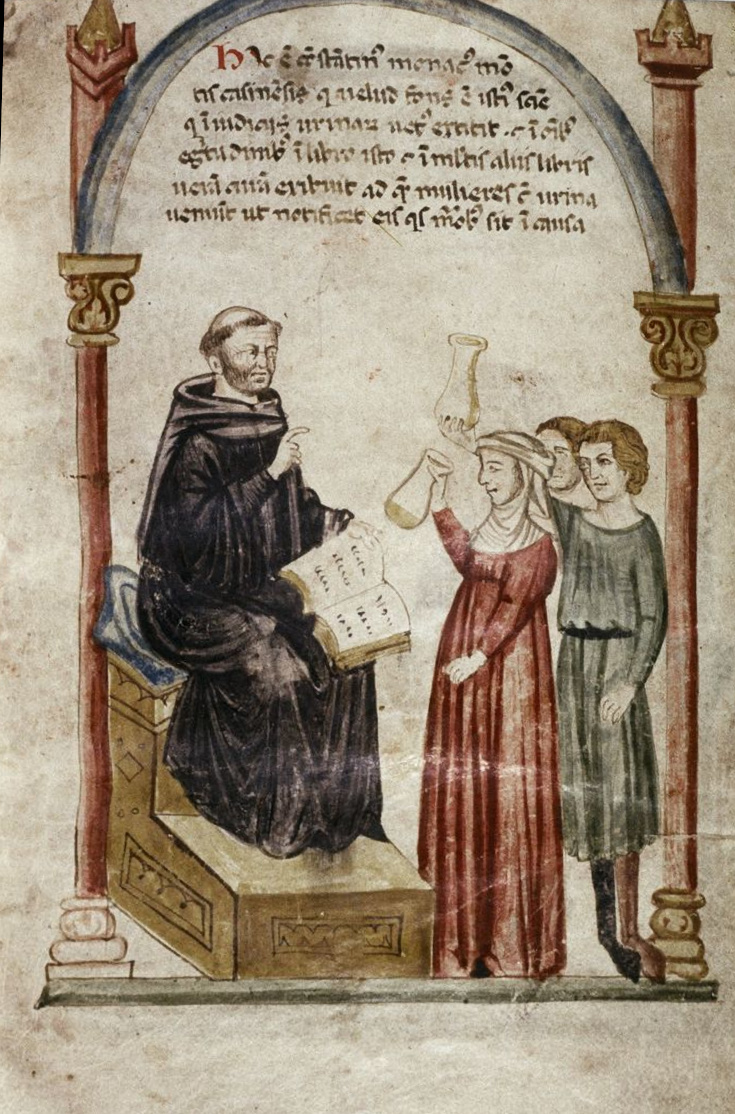
the analysis of urine

Physicians used many different techniques to analyze the imbalance of the four humours in the body. Uroscopy was most widely used for diagnosing illness. Physicians would collect patients urine in a flask called "matula". The matula was specific in shape and had four regions – circulus, superficies, substantia, and fundus – that corresponded to regions of the body. The circulus corresponded to the head; the superficies corresponded to the chest; the substantia corresponded to the abdomen; the fundus corresponded to the reproductive and urinary organs. Urine was inspected based on four criteria: color, consistency, odor, and presence of precipitate. Physicians analyzed the urine for the four criteria and used that to point out where there was an imbalance of the four humours based on the location in the matula. Physicians also examined blood via phlebotomy, they would observe the viscosity and color of the blood as it was draining from the patient and/or contained in a vial. The color and viscosity denoted whether the patient had an acute, major, or chronic disease; which also assisted the physician with the next course of action.

Physicians would also observe a patient's pulse by palpation; this technique was performed by carefully noting the rate, power, and tempo of a pulsing artery. By interpreting the pulse of the physician could diagnose the type of fever the patient had. Astrological diagnosis was the least used technique for diagnosing illness. Diagnosis was based on the position of the moon in relation to the constellations, which were associated with different regions of the body (head, arms, chest, etc.). Physicians would diagnose illness with the combined knowledge of zodiac signs and humoral medicine.

== Modern Era ==
=== 19th century ===
In the first half of the 19th century, the well-known British physiologist Marshall Hall emphasized the necessity of maintaining a close relationship between the theory and practice in medicine. He wrote On diagnosis (1817) and The Principles of Diagnosis (1834).

=== Oslerian Practice ===
The ideals of William Osler, who transformed the practice of medicine in the early 1900s, were based on the principles of the diagnosis and treatment of disease. According to Osler, the functions of a physician were to be able to identify disease and its manifestations and to understand its mechanisms and how it may be prevented or cured. For his medical students he believed that the best textbook was the patient himself—analysis of morbid anatomy and pathology were the keys. The Oslerian ideal continues today as the basis of the doctor's strategy is, "What disease does this patient have, and what is the best way for treatment?" The emphasis is on the classification of the disease in order to use the remedies available for its effects to be reversed or ameliorated. The human being in question is representative of a class of people with this type of disease; this person's biological individuality is not given any great weight.

The successor to William Osler as Regius Professor at Oxford was Archibald Garrod. Garrod echoed the observations of his Greek counterparts of two millennia ago, ...our chemical individualities are due to our chemical merits as well as our chemical shortcomings; and it is more nearly true to say that the factors which confer upon us our predispositions to and immunities from various mishaps which are spoken of as diseases, are inherent in our very chemical structure; and even in the molecular groupings which confer upon us our individualities, and which went into the making of the chromosomes from which we sprang. Because Garrod practiced in the early 1900s, well before the knowledge of DNA encoding genes that in turn encoded proteins responsible for bodily structure and functions were discovered, it took some time before medicine could fully appreciate the fundamental importance of his concept of diagnosis.

Whereas Osler laid the founding principles by which medicine should be practiced, Garrod placed these principles in a greater context of a chemical individuality that is inherited and is subject to the mechanisms of evolutionary selection. The Oslerian ideal of medical practice continues to dominate medical philosophy today. The patient is a collective of symptoms to be characterized and analyzed algorithmically in order to draw a diagnosis and subsequently produce a strategy of treatment. Medicine is about problems based solutions. In keeping with this philosophy, today's pathology reports provide a momentary snapshot of the patient's biochemical profile, highlighting the result of the disease process.

=== Influence of DNA Technology ===
Garrod's conception of biological individuality was confirmed with the advent of the sequencing of the human genome. Finally the subtle relationship between inheritance, individuality and environment became apparent via the variations detected in DNA. In each patient's DNA lies a script for how their bodies will change and become ill as well as how they will handle the assaults of the environment from the beginning of their life to its end. It is hoped that by knowing a patient's genes that the biological strengths and weaknesses in respect to these assaults will be revealed and disease processes can be predicted before they have the opportunity to manifest. Although knowledge in this area is far from complete, there are already medical interventions based on this. More importantly, the physician, forewarned with this knowledge can guide the patient towards appropriate lifestyle changes to anticipate and mitigate disease processes.

== Sources ==
- Berger D (July 1999). "A brief history of medical diagnosis and the birth of the clinical laboratory. Part 1--Ancient times through the 19th century". Mlo. 31 (7): 28–30, 32, 34–40. PMID 10539661.
- Dal Canton A, Castellano M (August 1988). "Theory of urine formation and uroscopic diagnosis in the Medical School of Salerno". Kidney International. 34 (2): 273–277. doi:10.1038/ki.1988.176. PMID 3054223.
- Deng T (1999). "Section One: Examination Methods". Practical Diagnosis in Traditional Chinese Medicine (5th reprint, 2005 ed.). Elsevier. pp. 1–162. ISBN 978-0-443-04582-0. LCCN 98037012. OCLC 98037012.
- Diamandopoulos AA, Goudas PC (2005). "The late Greco-Roman and Byzantine contribution towards the evolution of laboratory examinations of bodily excrement. Part 2: sputum, vomit, blood, sweat, autopsies". Clinical Chemistry and Laboratory Medicine. 43 (1): 90–96. doi:10.1515/CCLM.2005.014. PMID 15653449. S2CID 23368409.
- Ginzburg C (1984). "Morelli, Freud, and Sherlock Holmes: Clues and Scientific Method". In Eco U, Sebeok T (eds.). The Sign of Three: Dupin, Holmes, Peirce. Bloomington, IN: History Workshop, Indiana University Press. pp. 81–118. ISBN 978-0-253-35235-4. LCCN 82049207. OCLC 9412985.
- Goodman LE (2003). Islamic Humanism. Oxford University Press. ISBN 978-0-19-513580-0. LCCN 2002071525. OCLC 472527462.
- Horstmanshoff HF, Stol M, Tilburg C (2004). Magic and Rationality in Ancient Near Eastern and Graeco-Roman Medicine. Brill Publishers. ISBN 978-90-04-13666-3. LCCN 2004050576. OCLC 217878445.
- Kleisiaris CF, Sfakianakis C, Papathanasiou IV (15 March 2014). "Health care practices in ancient Greece: The Hippocratic ideal". Journal of Medical Ethics and History of Medicine. 7: 6. PMC 4263393. PMID 25512827.
- Lindberg DC, Shank MH (2013). The Cambridge history of science. Volume 2, Medieval science. Cambridge: Cambridge University Press. doi:10.1017/CHO9780511974007. ISBN 978-0-511-97400-7.
- Manuel DE (1996). Marshall Hall (1790-1857): Science and Medicine in Early Victorian Society. Clio medica. Vol. 37. Rodopi.
- Mark JJ (December 2022). "Egyptian medical treatments". World History Encyclopedia.
- Metwaly AM, Ghoneim MM, Eissa IH, Elsehemy IA, Mostafa AE, Hegazy MM, et al. (October 2021). "Traditional ancient Egyptian medicine: A review". Saudi Journal of Biological Sciences. 28 (10): 5823–5832. Bibcode:2021SJBS...28.5823M. doi:10.1016/j.sjbs.2021.06.044. PMC 8459052. PMID 34588897. S2CID 237930766.
- Mooney LR (October 1984). "A middle English verse compendium of astrological medicine". Medical History. 28 (4): 406–419. doi:10.1017/s0025727300036280. PMC 1140013. PMID 6390033. ProQuest 1301887378.
- Needham J, Lu GD (1980). Celestial Lancets. Cambridge: Cambridge University Press. ISBN 978-0-521-21513-8. LCCN 79041734. OCLC 638024213.
- Peña JC (2002). "El concepto de enfermedad y de los padecimientos del riñón en la medicina náhuatl. Síntesis de la medicina precolombina mesoamericana" [The concept of illness and kidney diseases in Nahuatl medicine. Synthesis of Mesoamerican pre-Columbian medicine]. Revista de investigacion clinica (in Spanish). 54 (5): 474–481. PMID 12587423.
- Pirmohamed M (October 2001). "Pharmacogenetics and pharmacogenomics". British Journal of Clinical Pharmacology. 52 (4): 345–347. doi:10.1046/j.0306-5251.2001.01498.x. PMC 2014592. PMID 11678777.
- Scurlock JA, Andersen BR (2005). Diagnoses in Assyrian and Babylonian Medicine: Ancient Sources, Translations, and Modern Medical Analyses. University of Illinois Press. ISBN 978-0-252-02956-1. JSTOR 10.5406/j.ctt2ttfm5.
- Sivin N (1993). "Huang-ti nei-ching" [Yellow Emperor's Inner Canon]. In Loewe M (ed.). Early Chinese Texts: A Bibliographical Guide. Berkeley: Institute for East Asian Studies, University of California, Berkeley. ISBN 978-1-55729-043-4. LCCN 93040281. OCLC 29356935.
- Skinner P (2001). "Unani-tibbi" [denotes Arabic or Islamic medicine]. Encyclopedia of Alternative Medicine. Archived from the original on January 12, 2008.
- Stol M (1993). Epilepsy in Babylonia. Brill Publishers. ISBN 978-90-72371-63-8. OCLC 29232876.
- Ullmnn M (1978). Islamic Medicine. Edinburgh University Press. ISBN 978-0-7486-0907-9. JSTOR 10.3366/j.ctvxcrv7d.
- Wallis F (August 2000). "Signs and senses: diagnosis and prognosis in early medieval pulse and urine texts". Social History of Medicine. 13 (2): 265–278. doi:10.1093/shm/13.2.265. PMID 14535256.
- Wittern-Sterzel R (December 1999). "Diagnosis: the doctor and the urine glass". Lancet. 354 Suppl (SIV13): SIV13. doi:10.1016/S0140-6736(99)90356-2. PMID 10691423. S2CID 5274660.
