= Father of surgery =

Title given to various founders of surgery

Various individuals have advanced the surgical art and, as a result, have been called the Father of Surgery by various sources.

== Sushruta ==
Sushruta (IAST: Suśruta), the purported author of the Sanskrit-language Sushruta Samhita (Sushruta's Compendium), has been called the father of surgery Dating the Sushruta Samhita has been a matter of debate, but a partial manuscript has been dated to 878 CE. As of 2025, it is generally accepted by scholars that there were several ancient authors collectively called "Suśruta" who contributed to this text.

== Abu al-Qasim al-Zahrawi ==
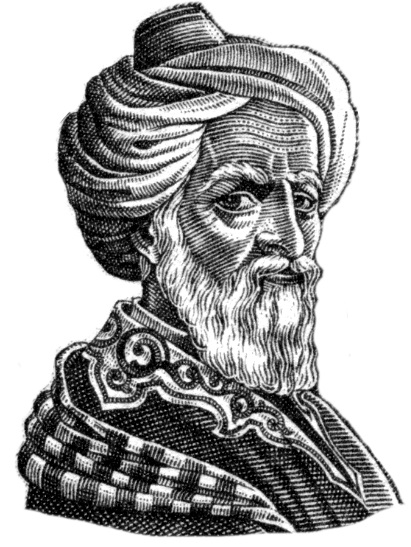
Al-Zahrawi, 963-1013

The Arab physician Abu al-Qasim al-Zahrawi (936–1013) wrote Al-Tasrif (The Method of Medicine), a 30-part medical encyclopedia in Arabic. In the encyclopedia, he introduced his collection of over 200 surgical instruments, many of which were never used before. Some of his works included being the first to describe and prove the hereditary pattern behind hemophilia, as well as describing ectopic pregnancy and stone babies. He has been called the "father of surgery".

The 14th century French surgeon Guy de Chauliac quoted Al-Tasrif over 200 times. Abu Al-Qasim's influence continued for at least five centuries after his death, extending into the Renaissance, evidenced by al-Tasrif's frequent reference by French surgeon Jacques Daléchamps (1513–1588).

== Guy de Chauliac ==
The Frenchman Guy de Chauliac (c. 1300–1368) is said by the Encyclopædia Britannica to have been the most eminent surgeon of the European Middle Ages. He wrote the surgical work Chirurgia magna, which was used as a standard text for some centuries. He has been called the "father of modern surgery".

== Ambroise Paré ==
The French surgeon Ambroise Paré (1517–1590) worked as a military doctor. He reformed the treatment of gunshot wounds, rejecting the practice, common at that time, of cauterizing the wound, and ligatured blood vessels in amputated limbs. His collected works were published in 1575. He has been called the "father of modern surgery".

== Hieronymus Fabricius ==
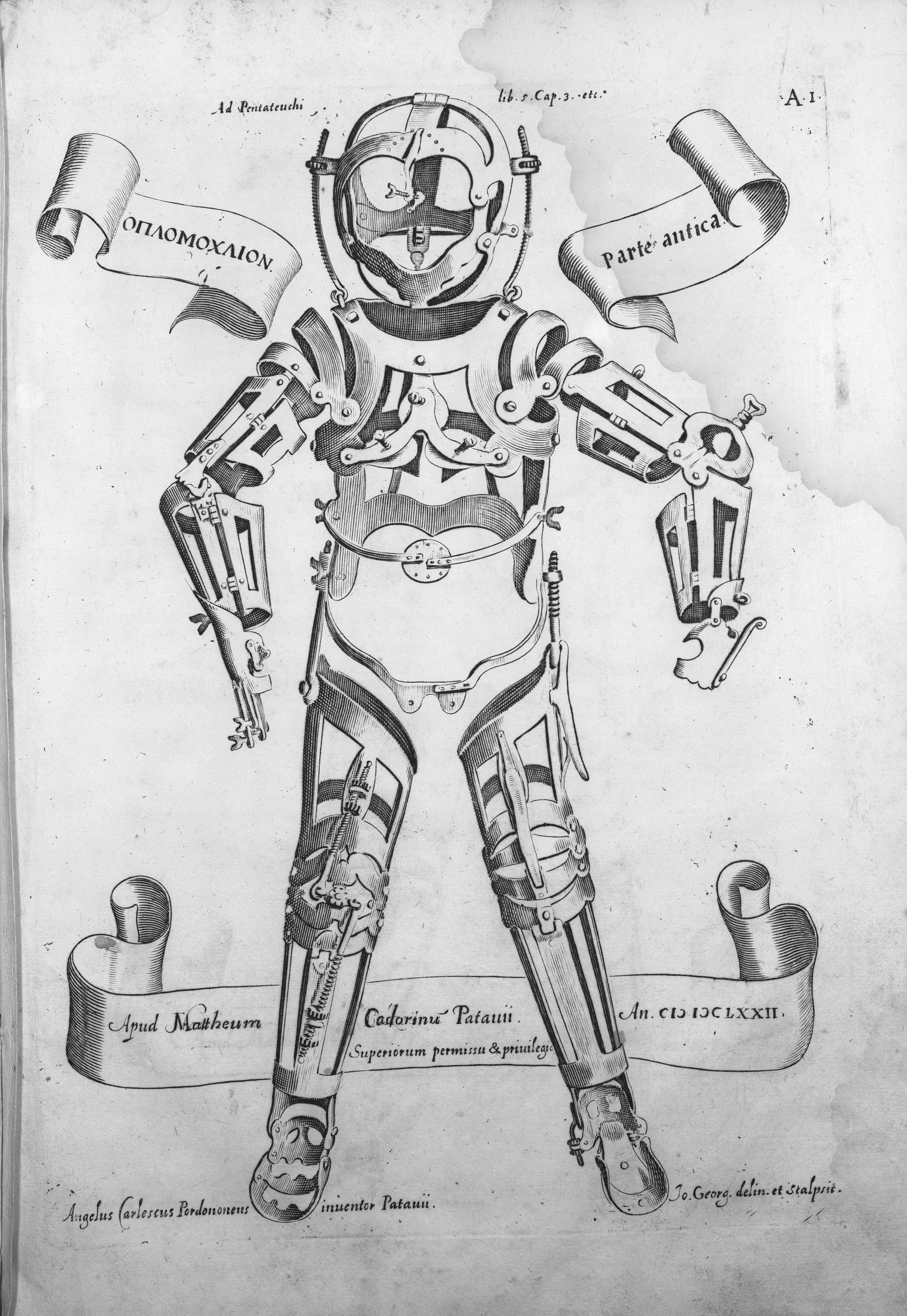
Hieronymus Fabricius, Operationes chirurgicae, 1685

The Italian anatomist and surgeon Hieronymus Fabricius (1537–1619) taught William Harvey, and published a work on the valves of the veins. He has been called the "father of ancient surgery".

== John Hunter ==
The Scotsman John Hunter (1728–1793) was known for his scientific, experimental approach to medicine and surgery. He has been called the "father of modern surgery".

== Philip Syng Physick ==
The American surgeon Philip Syng Physick (1768–1837) worked in Philadelphia and invented a number of new surgical methods and instruments. He has been called the "father of modern surgery".

== Joseph Lister ==
The Englishman Joseph Lister (1827–1912) became well known for his advocacy of the use of carbolic acid (phenol) as an antiseptic, and was dubbed the "father of modern surgery" as a result.

== Theodor Billroth ==
The German Theodor Billroth (1829–1894) was an early user of antisepsis, and was the first to perform a resection of the esophagus, and various other operations. He has been called the "father of modern surgery".

== William Stewart Halsted ==
The American William Stewart Halsted (1852–1922) pioneered the radical mastectomy, and designed a residency training program for American surgeons. He has been called "the most innovative and influential surgeon the United States has produced", and also the "father of modern surgery".

== James Henderson Nicoll ==
The Scottish James Henderson Nicoll (1863–1921) pioneered a surgical cure for Pyloric stenosis and outpatient care of children with Spina bifida, and was known as the Father of Day Surgery.

== Gallery ==
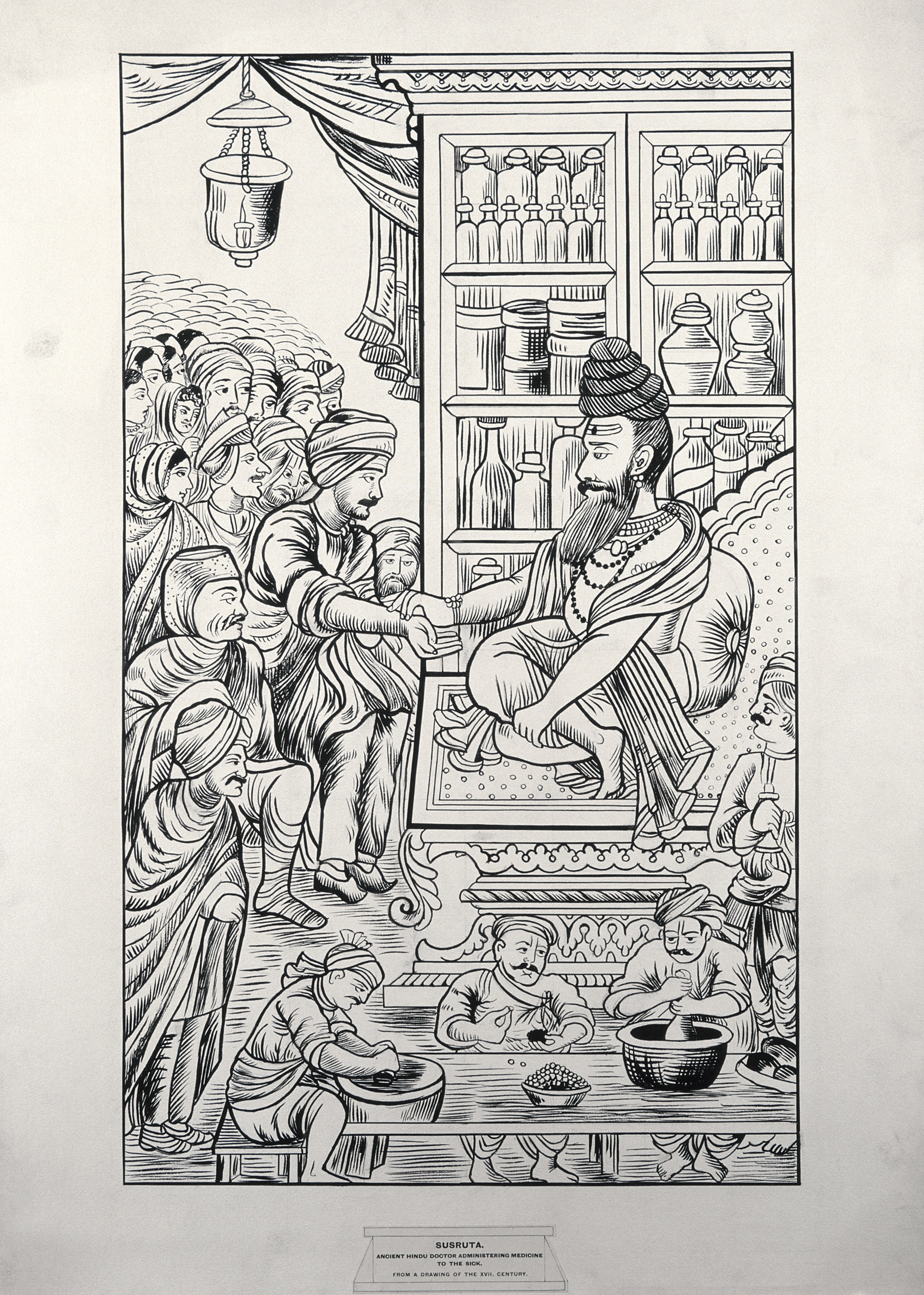
Susruta

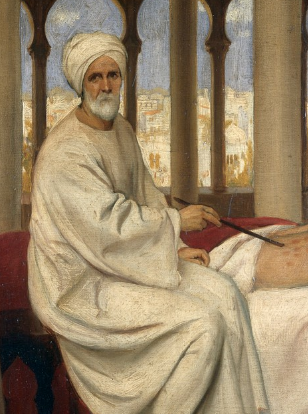
Al-Zahrawi

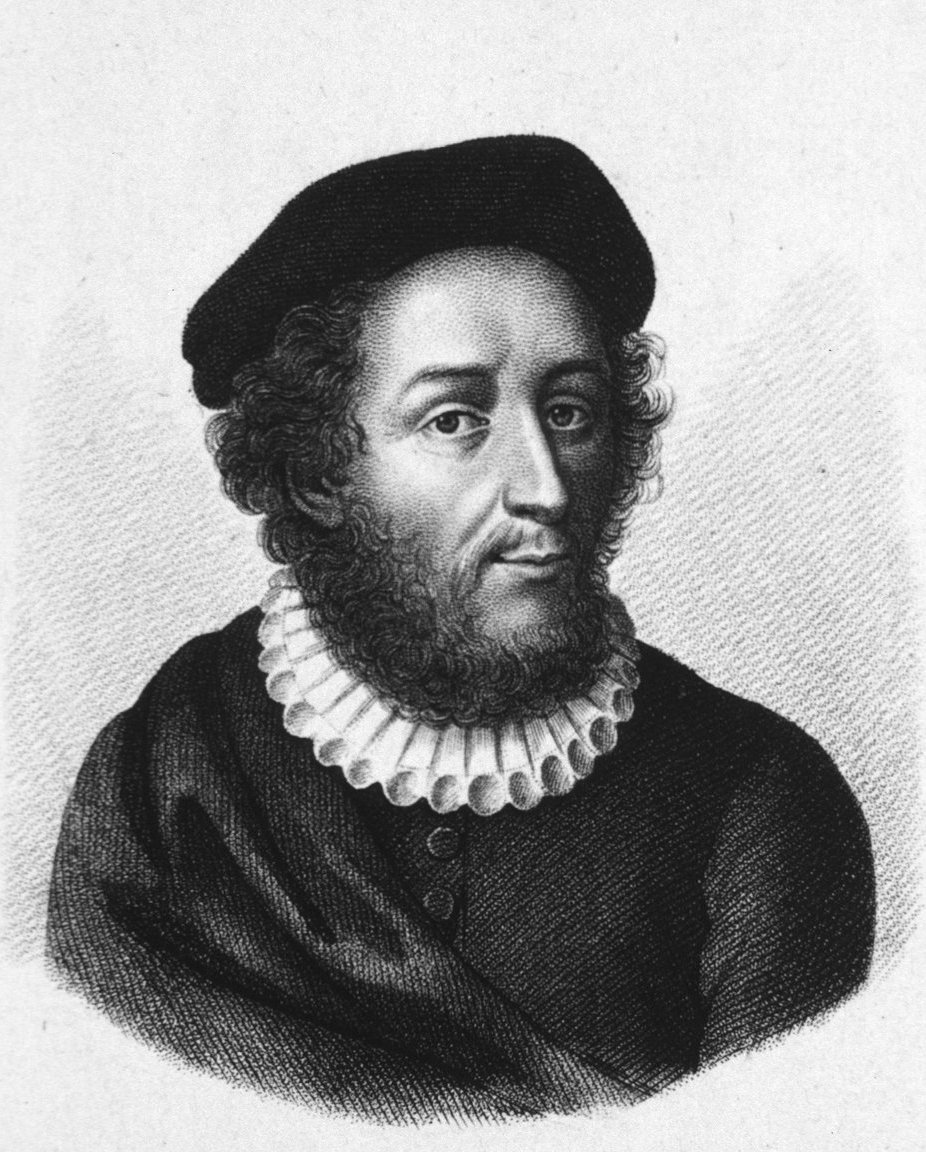
Guy de Chauliac

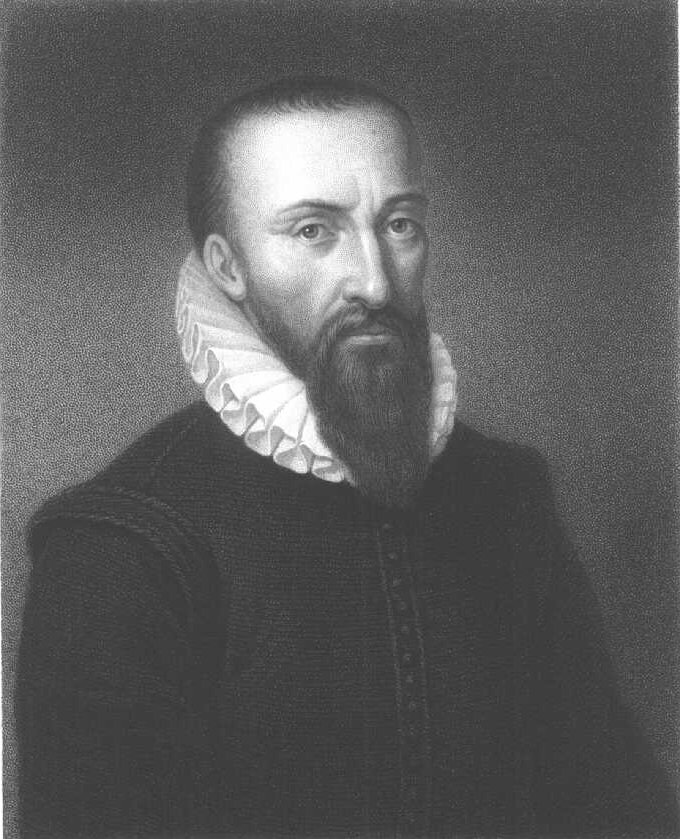
Ambroise Paré

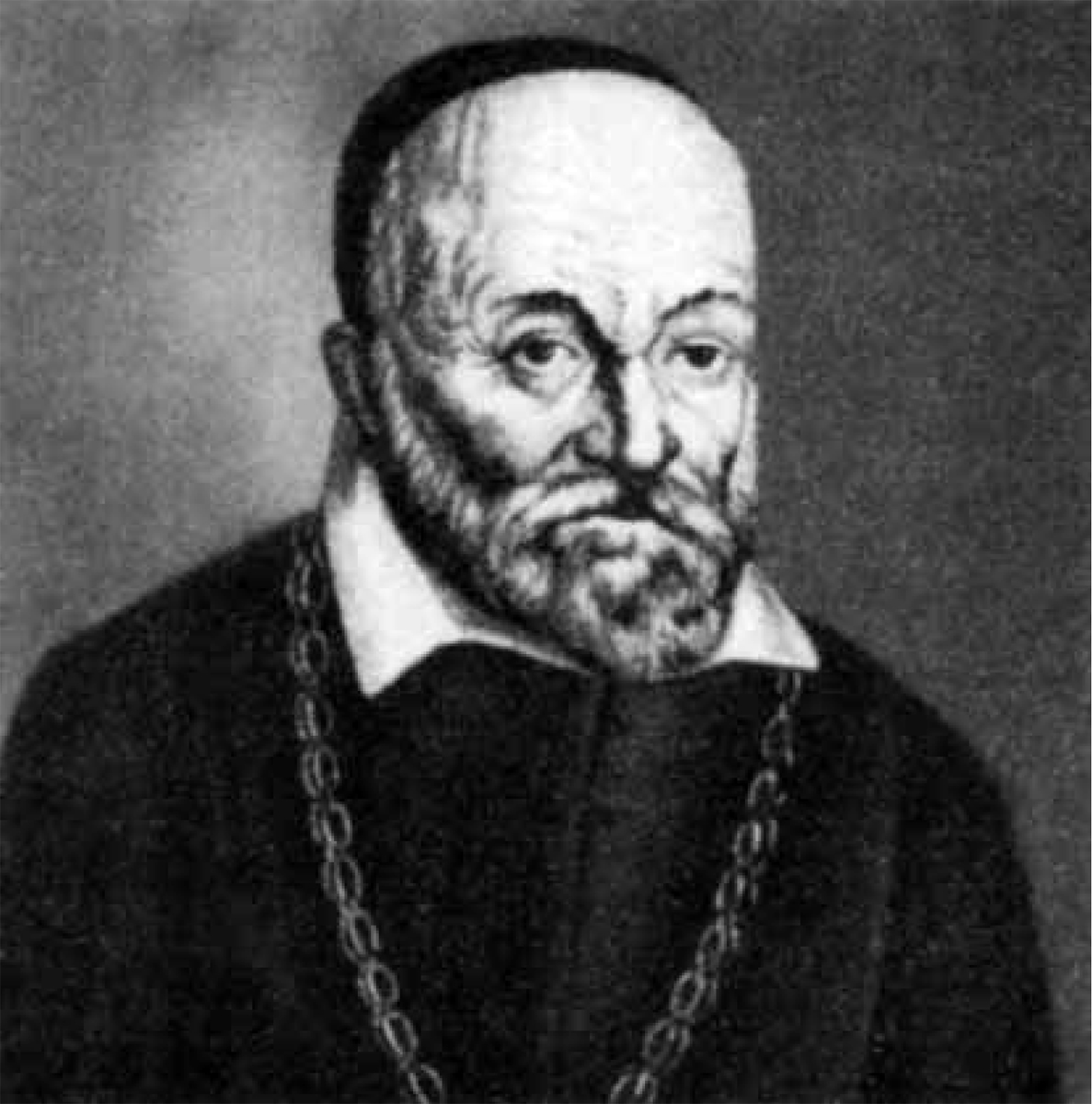
Hieronymus Fabricius

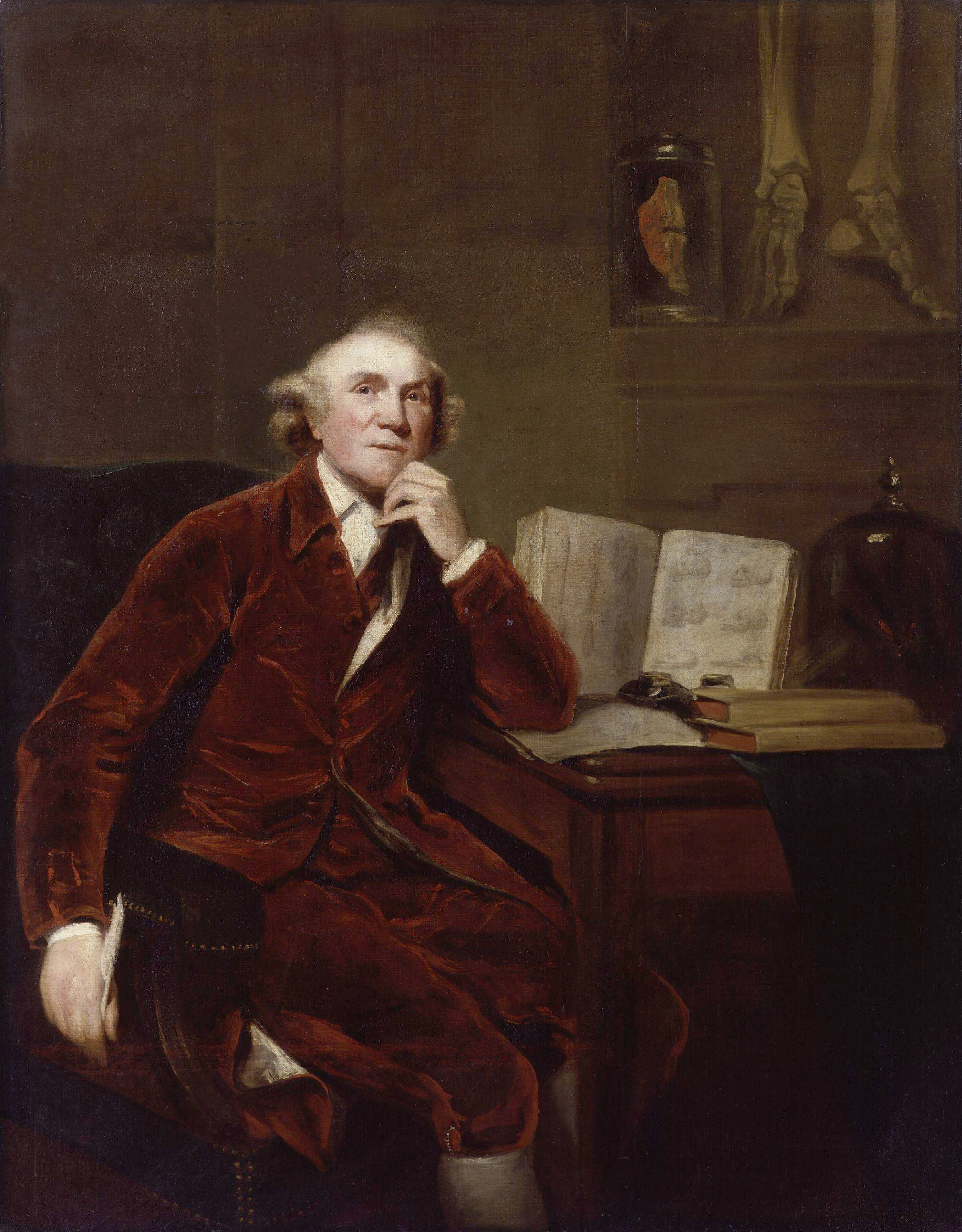
John Hunter

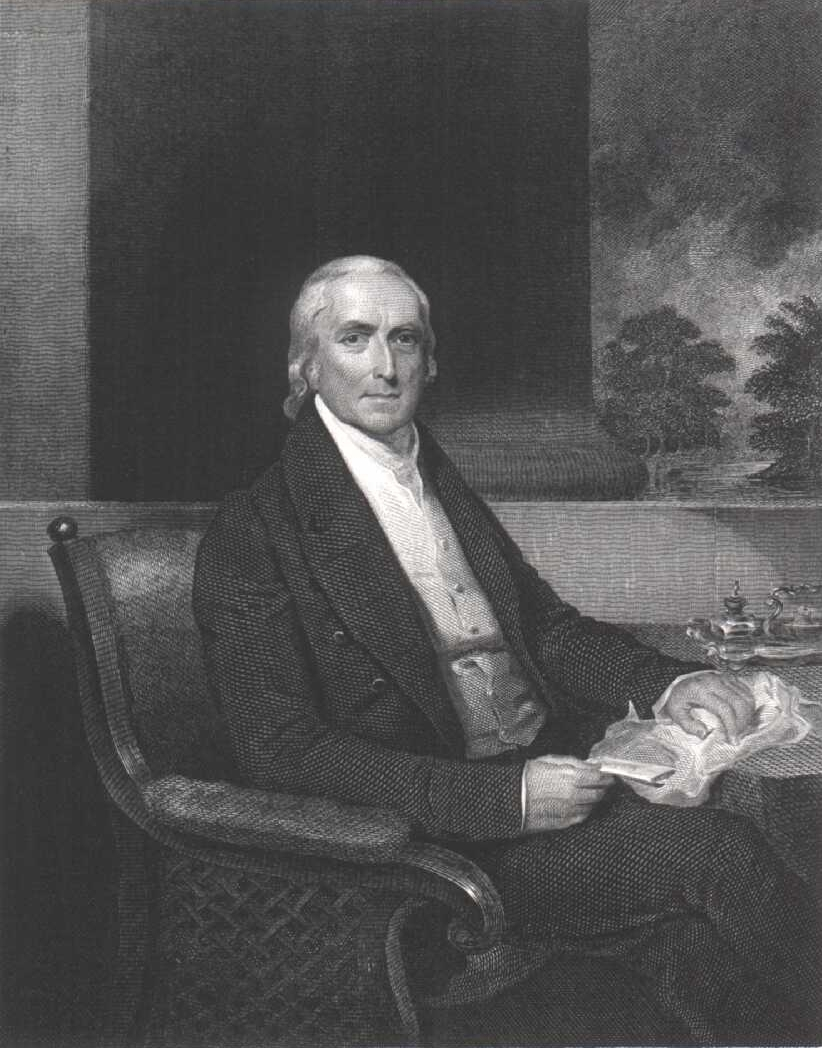
Philip Syng Physick

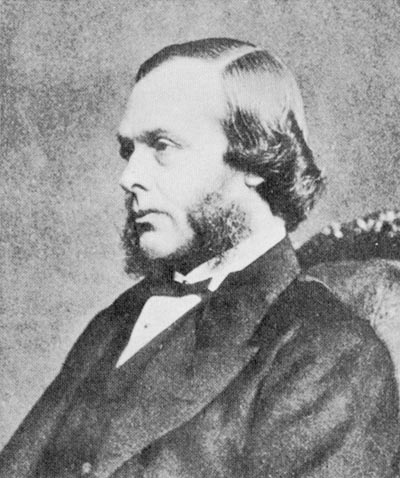
Joseph Lister

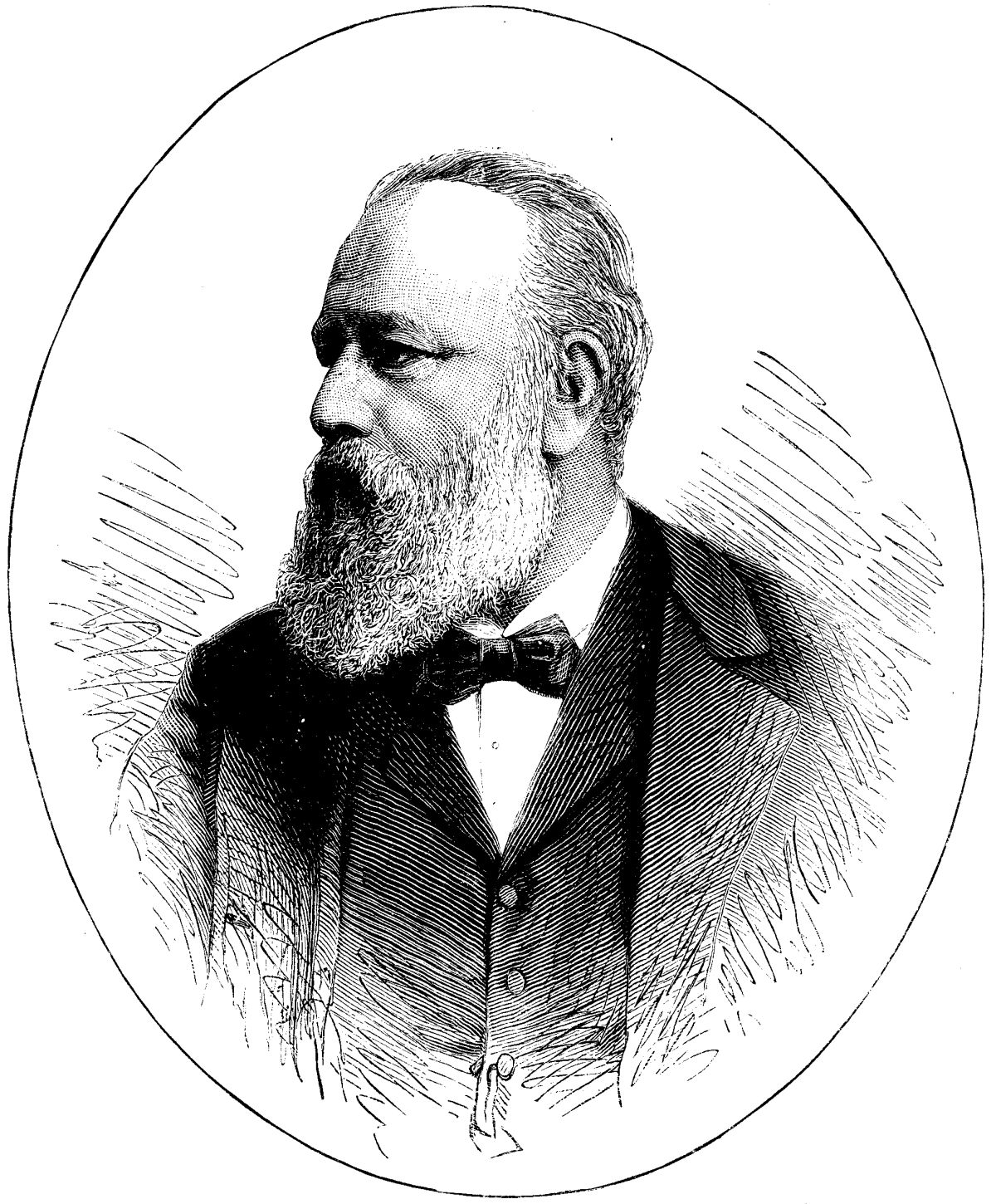
Theodor Billroth

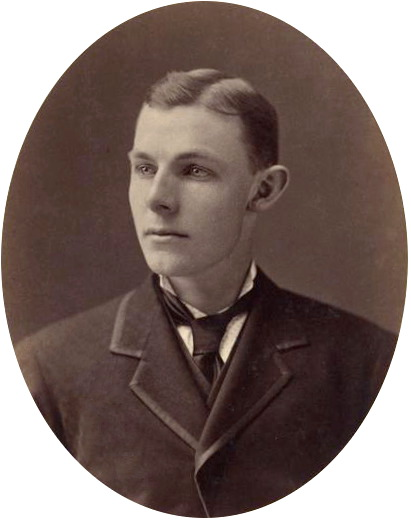
William Stewart Halsted

== See also ==
- List of people considered father or mother of a scientific field
