= Al-Tasrif =

Medieval medical encyclopedia by al-Zahrawi (Albucasis)

al-Tasrif
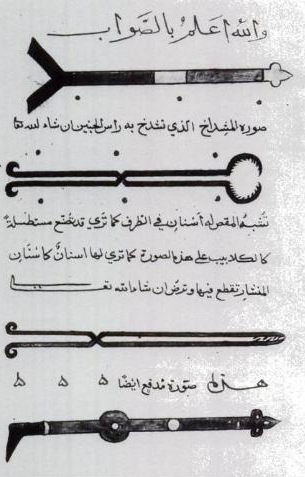
- Author: al-Zahrawi
- Original title: كتاب التصريف لمن عجز عن التأليف
- Published: c. 1000

The Kitāb al-Taṣrīf (Arabic: كتاب التصريف لمن عجز عن التأليف, lit. 'The Arrangement of Medical Knowledge for One Who is Not Able to Compile a Book for Himself'), known in English as The Method of Medicine, is a 30-volume Arabic encyclopedia on medicine and surgery, written near the year 1000 by Abu al-Qasim al-Zahrawi (Abulcasis). It is available in translation. The Kitab al-Tasrif took al-Zahrawi over 50 years to complete. It contains information about a wide variety of illnesses, injuries, medical conditions, treatments, and surgical procedures. It describes over 200 different surgical instruments. Surgeons continued to rely on the Kitab al-Tasrif well into the 1700s.

== Summary ==
The work covers a broad range of medical topics, including on surgery, medicine, orthopaedics, ophthalmology, pharmacology, nutrition, dentistry, childbirth, and pathology. The last treatise and the most celebrated one is about surgery. Al-Zahrawi stated that he chose to discuss surgery in the last volume because surgery is the highest form of medicine, and one must not practice it until he becomes well-acquainted with all other branches of medicine.

== On Surgery and Instruments ==
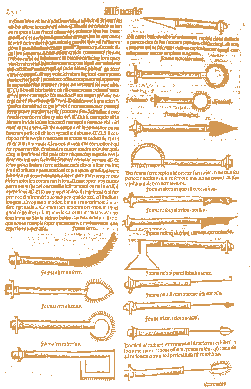
Page from a 1531 Latin translation by Peter Argellata of Al-Zahrawi's treatise on surgical and medical instruments.

On Surgery and Instruments is the 30th and last volume of Kitab al-Tasrif. In it, al-Zahrawi draws diagrams of each tool used in different procedures to clarify how to carry out the steps of each treatment.

Al-Zahrawi claims that his knowledge comes from careful reading of previous medical texts as well as his own experience: “…whatever skill I have, I have derived for myself by my long reading of the books of the Ancients and my thirst to understand them until I extracted the knowledge of it from them. Then through the whole of my life I have adhered to experience and practice…I have made it accessible for you and rescued it from the abyss of prolixity”.

In the beginning of his book, al-Zahrawi states that the reason for writing this treatise was the degree of underdevelopment surgery had reached in the Islamic world, and the low status it was held by the physicians at the time. Al-Zahrawi ascribed such decline to a lack of anatomical knowledge and a misunderstanding of the human physiology.

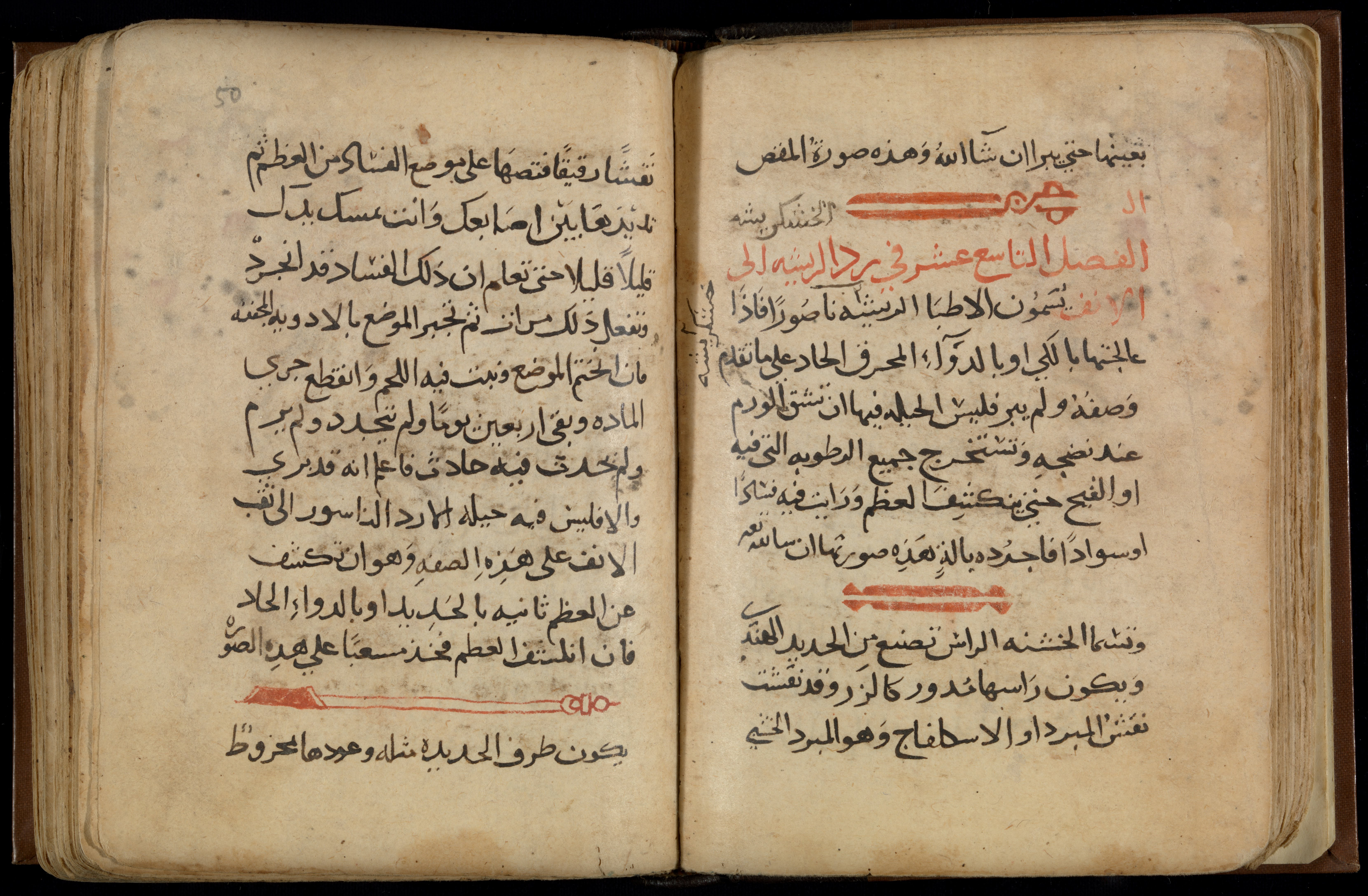
Two pages from the Arabic manuscript of the Kitab al-Tasrif. Middle East, 13th century, Chester Beatty Library.

Noting the importance of anatomy, he wrote:

"Before practicing surgery one should gain knowledge of anatomy and the function of organs so that he will understand their shape, connections and borders. He should become thoroughly familiar with nerves muscles bones arteries and veins. If one does not comprehend the anatomy and physiology one can commit a mistake which will result in the death of the patient. I have seen someone incise into a swelling in the neck thinking it was an abscess, when it was an aneurysm and the patient dying on the spot."

Innovative surgical techniques discussed by al-Zahrawi in the volume include crushing bladder stones with a sort of lithotrite he called "michaab", and using forceps for extracting a dead fetus. The text also contains a number of innovations in dentistry, including using gold and silver wires to ligate loosened teeth, extracting and replanting teeth, and scaling the calculus from the teeth to prevent periodontal disease.

Al-Zahrawi depicted over 200 surgical instruments, some of which he created himself. Instruments in the al-Tasrif include different kinds of scalpels, retractors, curettes, pincers, specula, and also instruments designed for his favoured techniques of cauterization and ligature. He also invented hooks with a double tip for use in surgery.

== Latin translation and legacy ==
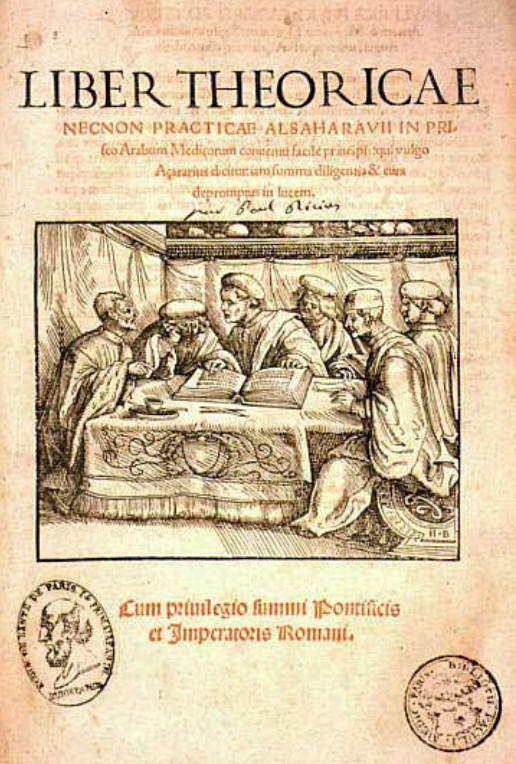
Frontispiece of the Latin translation of al-Zahrawi's Kitab al-Tasrif.

The book was translated into Latin in the 12th century by Gerard of Cremona. It soon found popularity in Europe and became a standard text in universities like those of Salerno and Montpellier. It remained the primary source on surgery in Europe for the next 500 years, and as the historian of medicine, Arturo Castiglioni, has put it: al-Zahrawi's treatise "in surgery held the same authority as did the Canon of Avicenna in medicine".

== Manuscripts ==
- Patna Manuscripts Two manuscripts are known from the archives of Khuda Bakhsh Oriental Public Library in Patna (India). These copies date back to the early 18th century CE.

== See also ==
- Islamic medicine
