= Arturo Castiglioni =

Italian-American historian

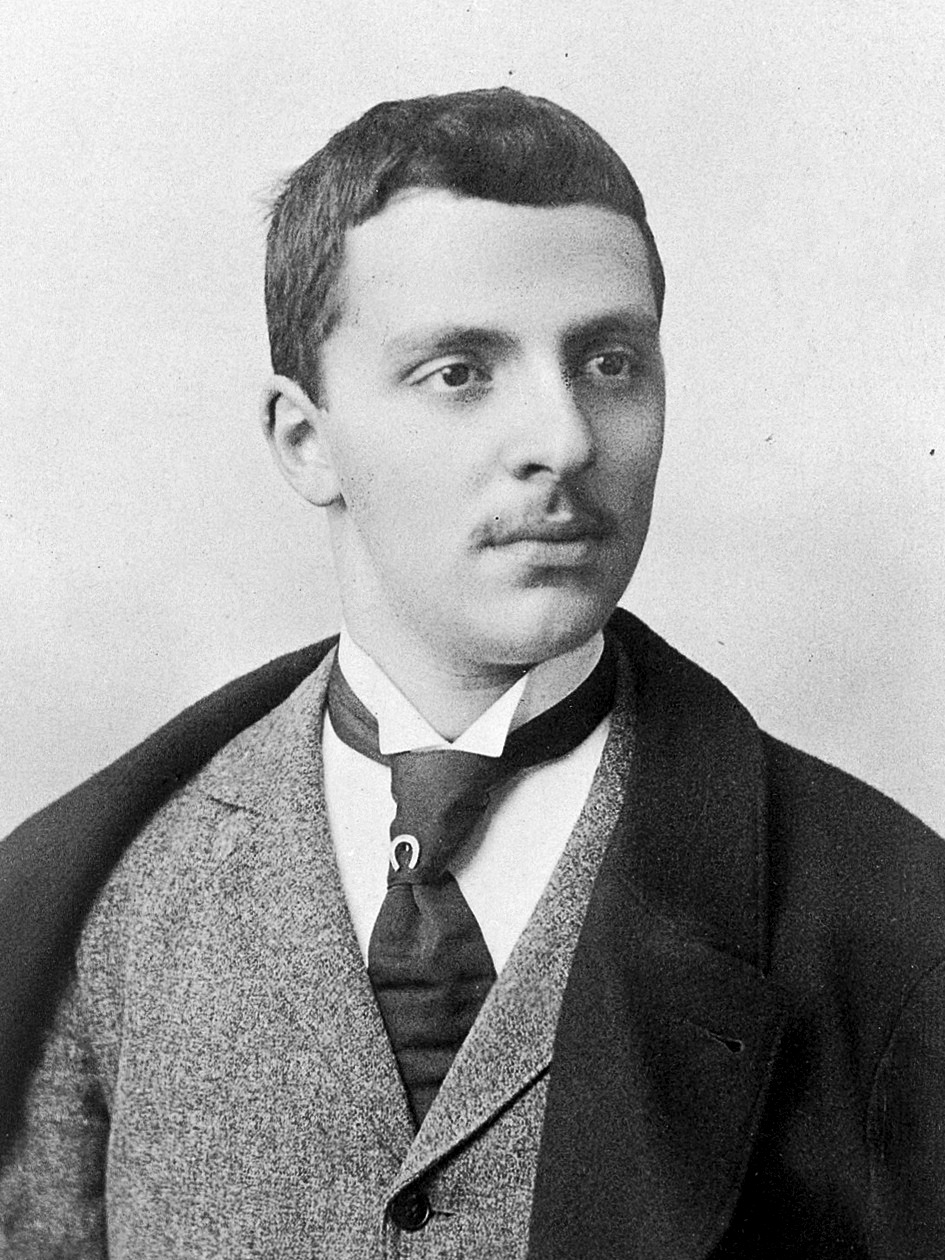
Arturo Castiglioni, c. 1900

Arturo Castiglioni (10 April 1874, Trieste – 21 January 1953, Milano) was an Austro-Hungarian Empire-born American medical historian and university professor.

== Biography ==
Castiglioni grew up in Trieste, Austro-Hungarian Empire. In 1939, he emigrated to the States and became a professor at Yale University in New Haven, Connecticut. His brother was Camillo Castiglioni, an Italian-Austrian banker. Castiglioni was a member of the International Society for the History of Medicine.

== Literary works ==
- Il volto di Ippocrate, 1925
- Storia della medicina, 1927
- Italian medicine, 1932
- The history of tuberculosis, 1933
- The renaissance of medicine in Italy, 1934
- Incantesimo e magia, 1934
- L'orto della sanita, 1935

== Bibliography ==
- John Farquhar Fulton, "Arturo Castiglioni 1874-1953", Journal of the History of Medicine and Allied Sciences, 1953, vol. 8, n. 2, pp. 129–132
