= Al-Zahrawi =

Berber Andalusian physician, surgeon and chemist (936–1013)

Abū al-Qāsim al-Zahrāwī
- أبو القاسم الزهراوي
- Born: c. 936; Medina Azahara, al-Andalus (near present-day Córdoba, Spain)
- Died: 1013 (aged 76–77)
- Occupation: Physician
- Known for: Pioneer of surgery; author of medical encyclopedia Kitab al-Tasrif

Academic work
- Era: Islamic Golden Age
- Influenced: Abu Muhammad bin Hazm, Guy de Chauliac, Jacques Daléchamps

Abū al-Qāsim Khalaf ibn al-'Abbās al-Zahrāwī al-Ansari (Note: Arabic: أبو القاسم خلف بن العباس الزهراوي) (c. 936–1013), popularly known as al-Zahrawi, (Note: الزهراوي) Latinised as Albucasis or Abulcasis (from Arabic Abū al-Qāsim), was an Arab physician, surgeon and chemist from al-Andalus. He is considered one of the greatest surgeons of the Middle Ages.

Al-Zahrawi's principal work is the Kitab al-Tasrif, a thirty-volume encyclopedia of medical practices. The surgery chapter of this work was later translated into Latin, attaining popularity and becoming the standard textbook in Europe for the next five hundred years. Al-Zahrawi's pioneering contributions to the field of surgical procedures and instruments had an enormous impact in the East and West well into the modern period, where some of his discoveries are still applied in medicine to this day. He pioneered the use of catgut for internal stitches, and his surgical instruments are still used today to treat people.

He was the first physician to identify the hereditary nature of haemophilia and describe an abdominal pregnancy, a subtype of ectopic pregnancy that in those days was a fatal affliction, and was first to discover the root cause of paralysis. He also developed surgical devices for Caesarean sections and cataract surgeries.

== Biography ==
Al-Zahrawi was born in the city of Azahara, 8 kilometers northwest of Cordoba, Andalusia. His birth date is not known for sure, however, scholars agree that he was born around 936, the year his birthplace city of Azahara was founded. The nisba (attributive title), Al-Ansari, in his name, suggests origin from the Medinian tribe of Al-Ansar, thus, tracing his ancestry back to Medina in the Arabian Peninsula.

He lived most of his life in Cordoba. It is also where he studied, taught and practiced medicine and surgery until shortly before his death in about 1013, two years after the sacking of Azahara.

Few details remain regarding his life, aside from his published work, due to the destruction of El-Zahra during later Castilian-Andalusian conflicts. His name first appears in the writings of Abu Muhammad bin Hazm (993–1064), who listed him among the greatest physicians of Moorish Spain. But we have the first detailed biography of al-Zahrawī from al-Ḥumaydī's Jadhwat al-Muqtabis (On Andalusian Savants), completed six decades after al-Zahrawi's death.

Al-Zahrawi was a court physician to the Andalusian caliph Al-Hakam II. He was a contemporary or near contemporary of Andalusian chemists such as Ibn al-Wafid, al-Majriti and Artephius. He devoted his entire life and genius to the advancement of medicine as a whole and surgery in particular. As a court physician, Zahrawi had access to the most advanced medical knowledge and resources of the time, allowing him to develop new techniques and instruments for surgical procedures. Zahrawi's time as a court physician to Al-Hakam II allowed him to develop his skills and knowledge as a physician and surgeon, and to make significant contributions to the field of medicine. His work helped to lay the foundation for modern surgical techniques and has had a lasting impact on the practice of medicine.

== Surgical career ==
Al-Zahrawi specialized in curing disease by cauterization. He invented several devices used during surgery, for purposes such as inspection of the interior of the urethra and also inspection, applying and removing foreign bodies from the throat, the ear and other body organs. He was also the first to illustrate the various cannulae and the first to treat a wart with an iron tube and caustic metal as a boring instrument.

While al-Zahrawi never performed the surgical procedure of tracheotomy, he did treat a slave girl who had cut her own throat in a suicide attempt. Al-Zahrawi sewed up the wound and the girl recovered, thereby proving that an incision in the larynx could heal. In describing this important case-history he wrote:

A slave-girl seized a knife and buried it in her throat and cut part of the trachea; and I was called to attend her. I found her bellowing like a sacrifice that has had its throat cut. So I laid the wound bare and found that only a little haemorrhage had come from it; and I assured myself that neither an artery nor jugular vein had been cut, but air passed out through the wound. So I hurriedly sutured the wound and treated it until healed. No harm was done to the slave-girl except for a hoarseness in the voice, which was not extreme, and after some days she was restored to the best of health. Hence we may say that laryngotomy is not dangerous.

Al-Zahrawi also pioneered neurosurgery and neurological diagnosis. He is known to have performed surgical treatments of head injuries, skull fractures, spinal injuries, hydrocephalus, subdural effusions and headache. The first clinical description of an operative procedure for hydrocephalus was given by Al-Zahrawi who clearly describes the evacuation of superficial intracranial fluid in hydrocephalic children.

== Kitab al-Tasrif ==
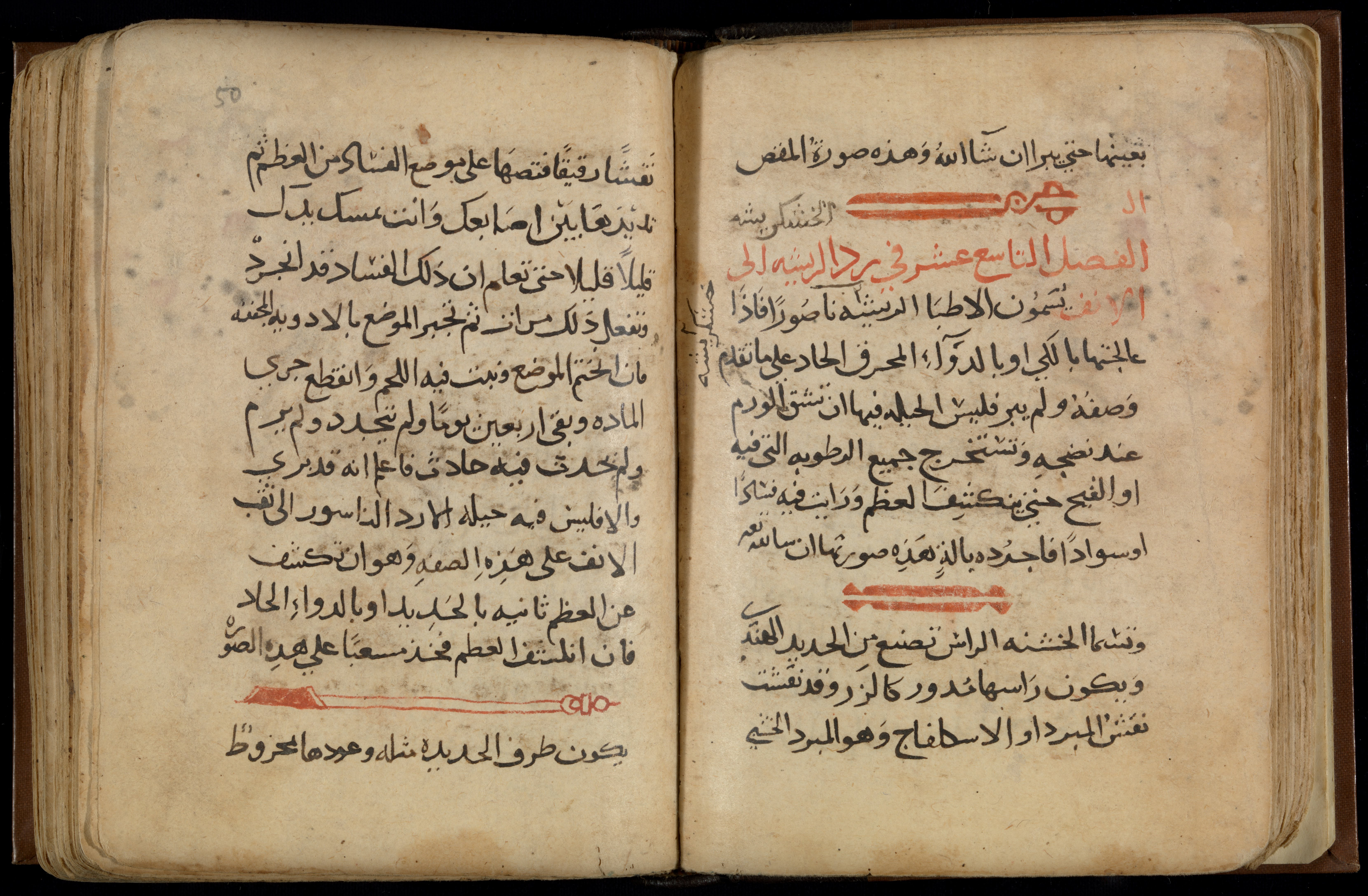
Two pages from the Arabic manuscript of the Kitab al-Tasrif. Middle East, 13th century, Chester Beatty Library.

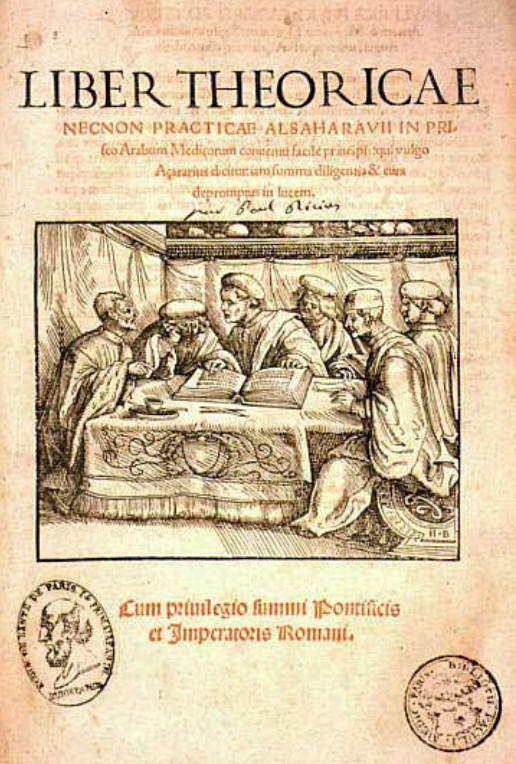
Frontispiece of the Latin translation of al-Zahrawi's Kitab al-Tasrif

Al-Zahrawi's thirty-volume medical encyclopedia, Kitāb al-Taṣrīf, completed in the year 1000, covered a broad range of medical topics, including on surgery, medicine, orthopaedics, ophthalmology, pharmacology, nutrition, dentistry, childbirth, and pathology. The first volume in the encyclopedia is concerned with general principles of medicine, the second with pathology, while much of the rest discuss topics regarding pharmacology and drugs. The last treatise and the most celebrated one is about surgery. Al-Zahrawi stated that he chose to discuss surgery in the last volume because surgery is the highest form of medicine, and one must not practice it until he becomes well-acquainted with all other branches of medicine.

The work contained data that had accumulated during a career that spanned almost 50 years of training, teaching and practice. In it he also wrote of the importance of a positive doctor–patient relationship and wrote affectionately of his students, whom he referred to as "my children". He also emphasized the importance of treating patients irrespective of their social status. He encouraged the close observation of individual cases in order to make the most accurate diagnosis and the best possible treatment.

Not always properly credited, modern evaluation of Kitab al-Tasrif manuscript has revealed on early descriptions of some medical procedures that were ascribed to later physicians. For example, Al-Zahrawi's Kitab al-Tasrif described both what would later become known as "Kocher's method" for treating a dislocated shoulder and "Walcher position" in obstetrics. Moreover, the Kitab al-Tasrif described how to ligature blood vessels almost 600 years before Ambroise Paré, and was the first recorded book to explain the hereditary nature of haemophilia. It was also the first to describe a surgical procedure for ligating the temporal artery for migraine, also almost 600 years before Pare recorded that he had ligated his own temporal artery for headache that conforms to current descriptions of migraine. Al-Zahrawi was, therefore, the first to describe the migraine surgery procedure that is enjoying a revival in the 21st century, spearheaded by Elliot Shevel, a South African surgeon.

=== On Surgery and Instruments ===
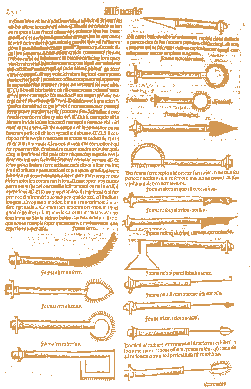
Page from a 1531 Latin translation by Peter Argellata of Al-Zahrawi's treatise on surgical and medical instruments

On Surgery and Instruments is the 30th and last volume of the Kitab al-Tasrif. It was without a doubt his most important work and the one which established his authority in Europe for centuries to come. On Surgery and Instruments is the first illustrated surgical guide ever written. Its contents and descriptions has contributed in many technological innovations in medicine, notably which tools to use in specific surgeries. In his book, al-Zahrawi draws diagrams of each tool used in different procedures to clarify how to carry out the steps of each treatment. The full text consists of three books, intended for medical students looking forward to gaining more knowledge within the field of surgery regarding procedures and the necessary tools.

The book was translated into Latin in the 12th century by Gerard of Cremona. It soon found popularity in Europe and became a standard text in all major Medical universities like those of Salerno and Montpellier. It remained the primary source on surgery in Europe for the next 500 years, and as the historian of medicine, Arturo Castiglioni, has put it: al-Zahrawi's treatise "in surgery held the same authority as did the Canon of Avicenna in medicine".

Al-Zahrawi claims that his knowledge comes from careful reading of previous medical texts as well as his own experience: "...whatever skill I have, I have derived for myself by my long reading of the books of the Ancients and my thirst to understand them until I extracted the knowledge of it from them. Then through the whole of my life I have adhered to experience and practice... I have made it accessible for you and rescued it from the abyss of prolixity".

In the beginning of his book, al-Zahrawi states that the reason for writing this treatise was the degree of underdevelopment surgery had reached in the Islamic world, and the low status it held amongst physicians at the time. Al-Zahrawi ascribed such decline to a lack of anatomical knowledge and a misunderstanding of the human physiology.

He who devoted himself to surgery
must be versed in the science of
anatomy.

— al-Zahrawi, Kitab al-Tasrif

Noting the importance of anatomy he wrote:

Before practicing surgery one should gain knowledge of anatomy and the function of organs so that he will understand their shape, connections and borders. He should become thoroughly familiar with nerves, muscles, bones, arteries and veins. If one does not comprehend the anatomy and physiology one can commit a mistake which will result in the death of the patient. I have seen someone incise into a swelling in the neck thinking it was an abscess, when it was an aneurysm and the patient dying on the spot.

In urology, al-Zahrawi wrote about taking stones out of the bladder. By inventing a new instrument, an early form of the lithotrite which he called michaab, he was able to crush the stone inside the bladder without the need for a surgical incision. His technique was important for the development of lithotomy, and an improvement over the existing techniques in Europe which caused severe pain for the patient, and came with high death rates.

In dentistry and periodontics, al-Zahrawi had the most significant contribution out of all Muslim physicians, and his book contained the earliest illustrations of dental instruments. He was known to use gold and silver wires to ligate loosened teeth, and has been credited as the first to use replantation in the history of dentistry. He also invented instruments to scale the calculus from the teeth, a procedure he recommended as a prevention from periodontal disease.

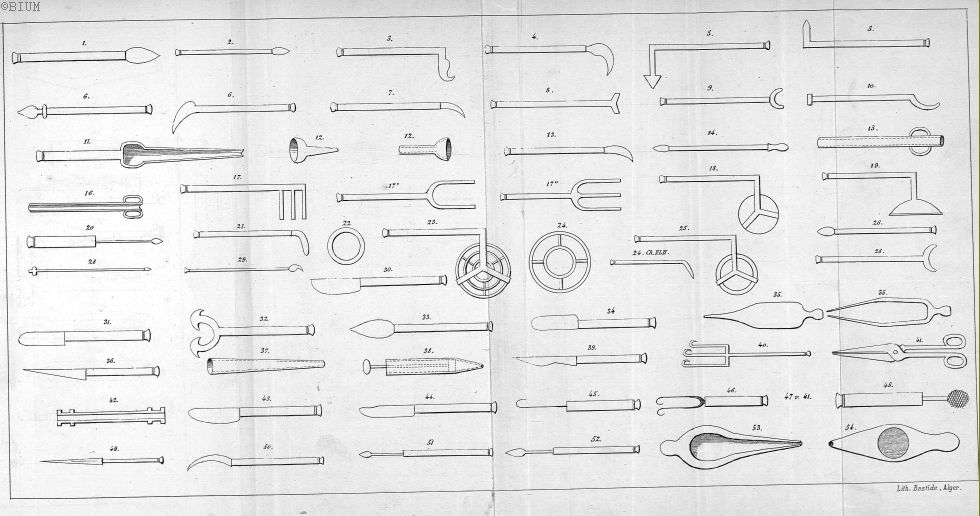
Surgical instruments described by al-Zahrawi

Al-Zahrawi introduced over 200 surgical instruments, which include, among others, different kinds of scalpels, retractors, curettes, pincers, specula, and also instruments designed for his favoured techniques of cauterization and ligature. He also invented hooks with a double tip for use in surgery. Many of these instruments were never used before by any previous surgeons.

His use of catgut for internal stitching is still practised in modern surgery. Catgut appears to be the only natural substance capable of dissolving and is acceptable by the body, an observation Al-Zahrawi discovered after his monkey ate the strings of his oud. Al-Zahrawi also invented the forceps for extracting a dead fetus, as illustrated in the Kitab al-Tasrif.

=== Tone ===
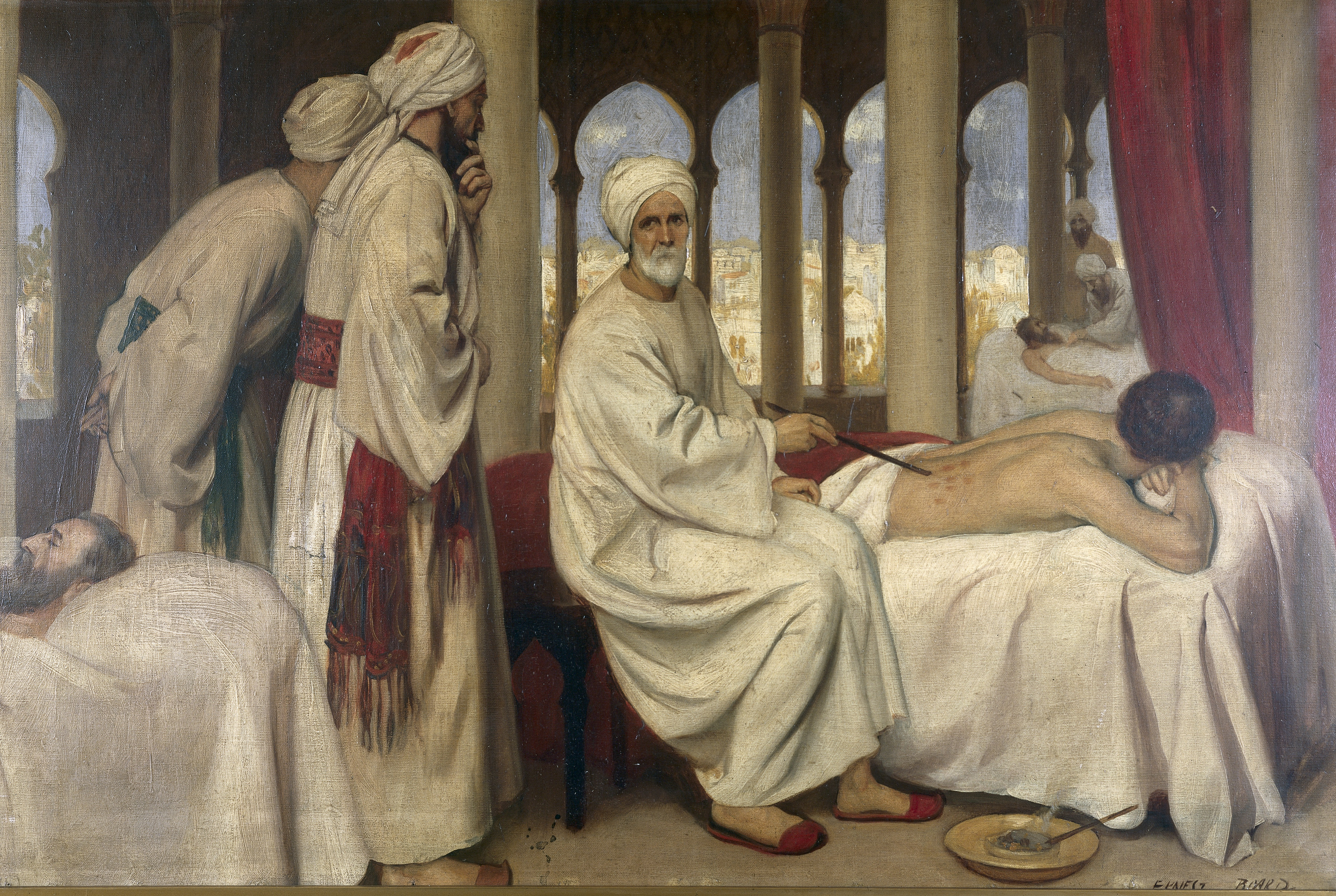
Albucasis blistering a patient in the hospital at Cordova

Throughout the text, Al-Zahrawi assumes an authoritative tone. In "On cauterization for numbness", he declares the procedure "should not be attempted except by one who has a good knowledge of the anatomy of the limbs and of the exits of the nerves that move the body". He warns that another procedure should not be attempted by any surgeon lacking "long training and practice in the use of cautery". He is not afraid to depart from old practice, disparaging the opinions that cauterization should only be used in the spring or that gold is the best material for cauterization: "cauterization is swifter and more successful with iron". In "On cauterization for pleurisy", he notes that the introduction of a red-hot probe into the intercostal space to evacuate pus from an abscess could result in the creation of "an incurable fistula" or even the immediate death of the patient.

== Pharmacology and cosmetics ==
In pharmacy and pharmacology, Al-Zahrawi pioneered the preparation of medicines by sublimation and distillation. He dedicated the 28th chapter of his book to pharmacy and pharmaceutical techniques. The chapter was later translated into Latin under the title of Liber Servitoris, where it served as an important source for European herbalists. The book is of particular interest, as it provides the reader with recipes and explains how to prepare the "simples" from which were compounded the complex drugs then generally used.

Al-Zahrawi also touched upon the subject of cosmetics and dedicated a chapter for it in his medical encyclopedia. As the treatise was translated into Latin, the cosmetic chapter was used in the West. Al-Zahrawi considered cosmetics a branch of medicine, which he called "Medicine of Beauty" (Adwiyat al-Zinah). He deals with perfumes, scented aromatics and incense. He also invented perfumed sticks rolled and pressed in special molds, perhaps the earliest antecedents of present-day lipsticks, and solid deodorants.

== Legacy ==
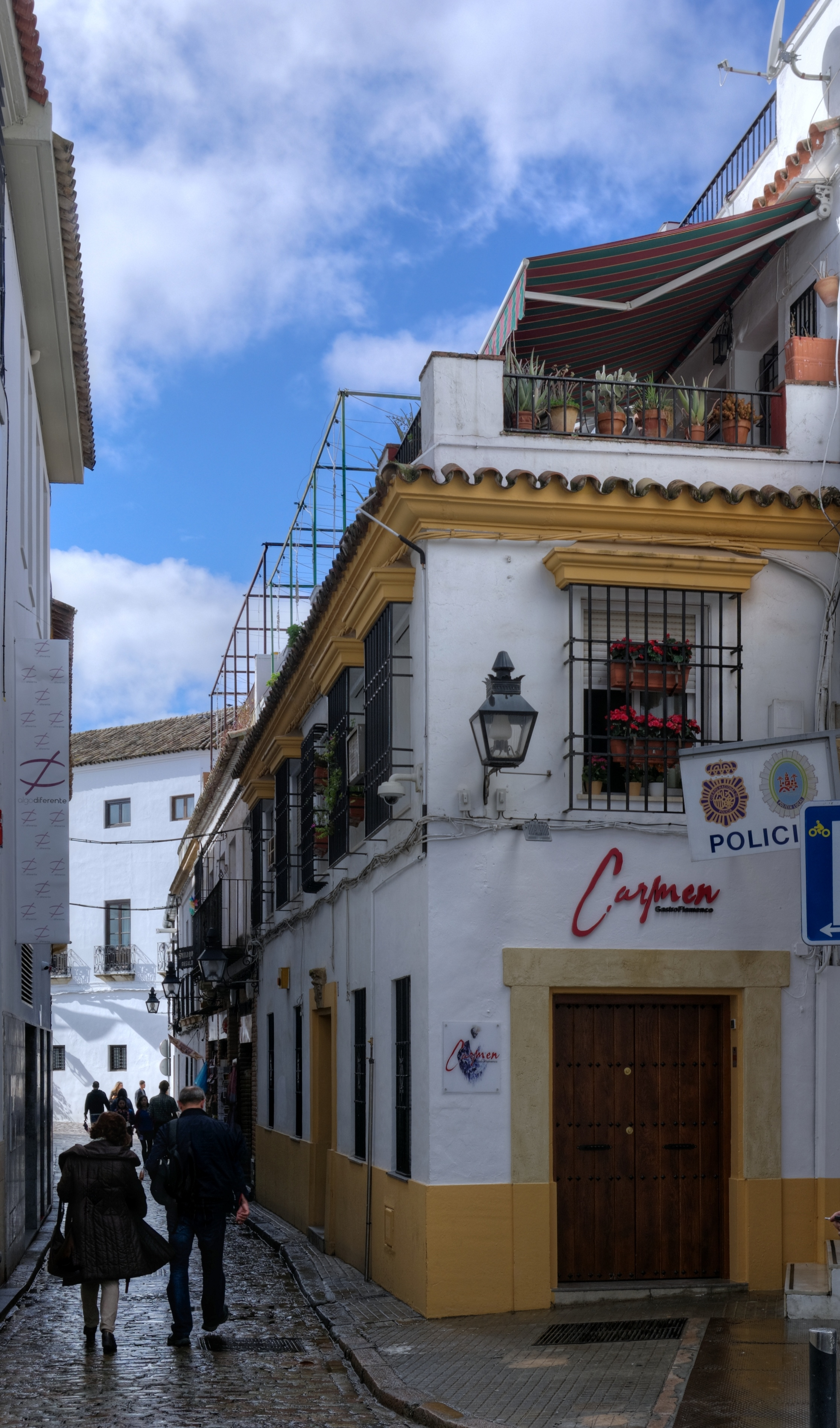
Calle Albucasis street at Cordova

Al-Zahrawi was the "most frequently cited surgical authority of the Middle Ages". Donald Campbell, a historian of Arabic medicine, described Al-Zahrawi's influence on Europe as follows:

The chief influence of Albucasis on the medical system of Europe was that his lucidity and method of presentation awakened a prepossession in favour of Arabic literature among the scholars of the West: the methods of Albucasis eclipsed those of Galen and maintained a dominant position in medical Europe for five hundred years, i.e long after it had passed its usefulness. He, however, helped to raise the status of surgery in Christian Europe; in his book on fractures and luxations, he states that 'this part of surgery has passed into the hands of vulgar and uncultivated minds, for which reason it has fallen into contempt.' The surgery of Albucasis became firmly grafted on Europe after the time of Guy de Chauliac (d.1368).

In the 14th century, the French surgeon Guy de Chauliac quoted al-Tasrif over 200 times. Pietro Argallata (d. 1453) described Al-Zahrawi as "without doubt the chief of all surgeons". Al-Zahrawi's influence continued for at least five centuries, extending into the Renaissance, evidenced by al-Tasrif's frequent reference by French surgeon Jacques Daléchamps (1513–1588).

The street in Córdoba where he lived is named in his honor as "Calle Albucasis". On this street he lived in house no. 6, which is preserved today by the Spanish Tourist Board with a bronze plaque (awarded in January 1977) which reads: "This was the house where Al-Zahrawi lived."

== De Chirurgia gallery ==
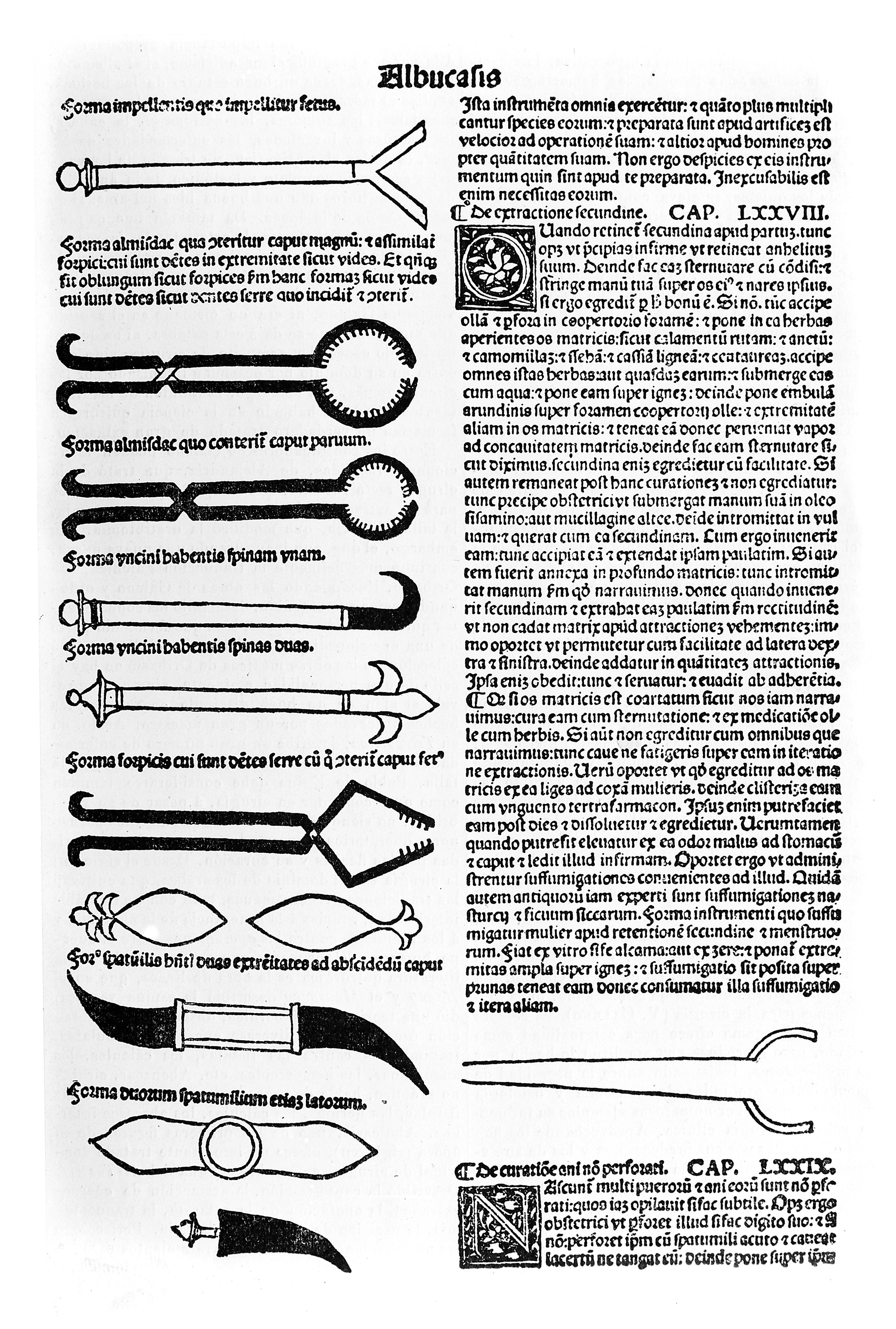

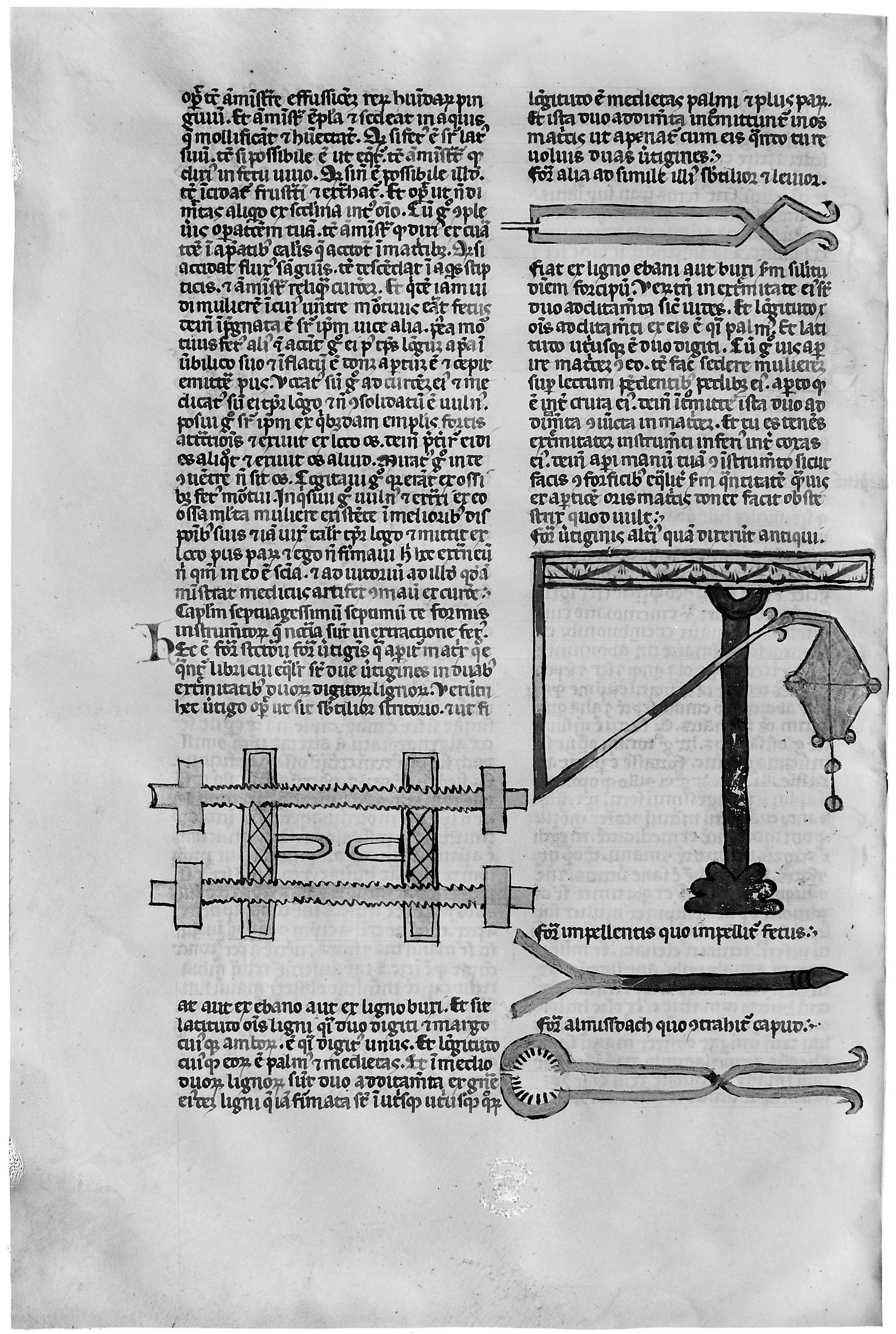

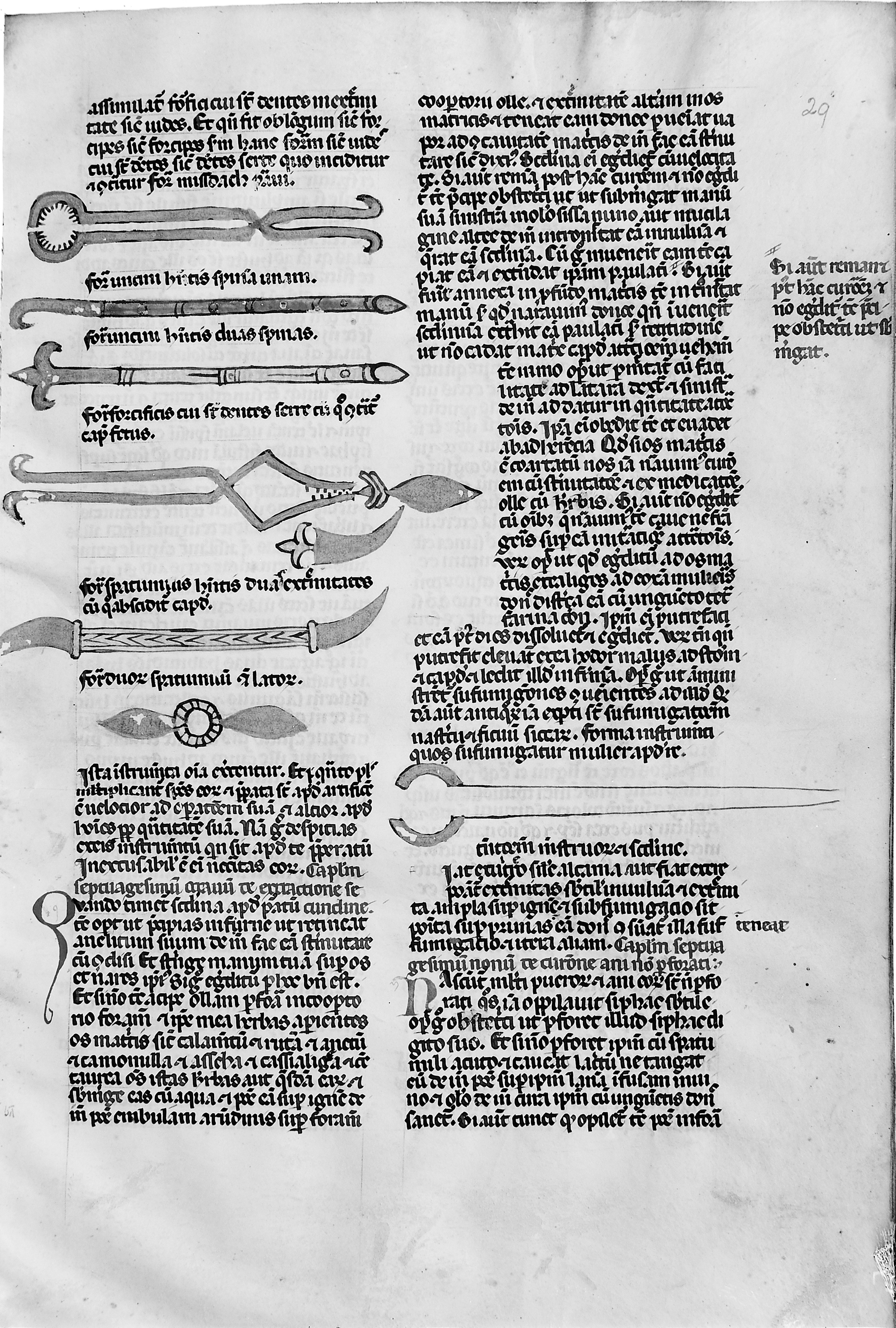

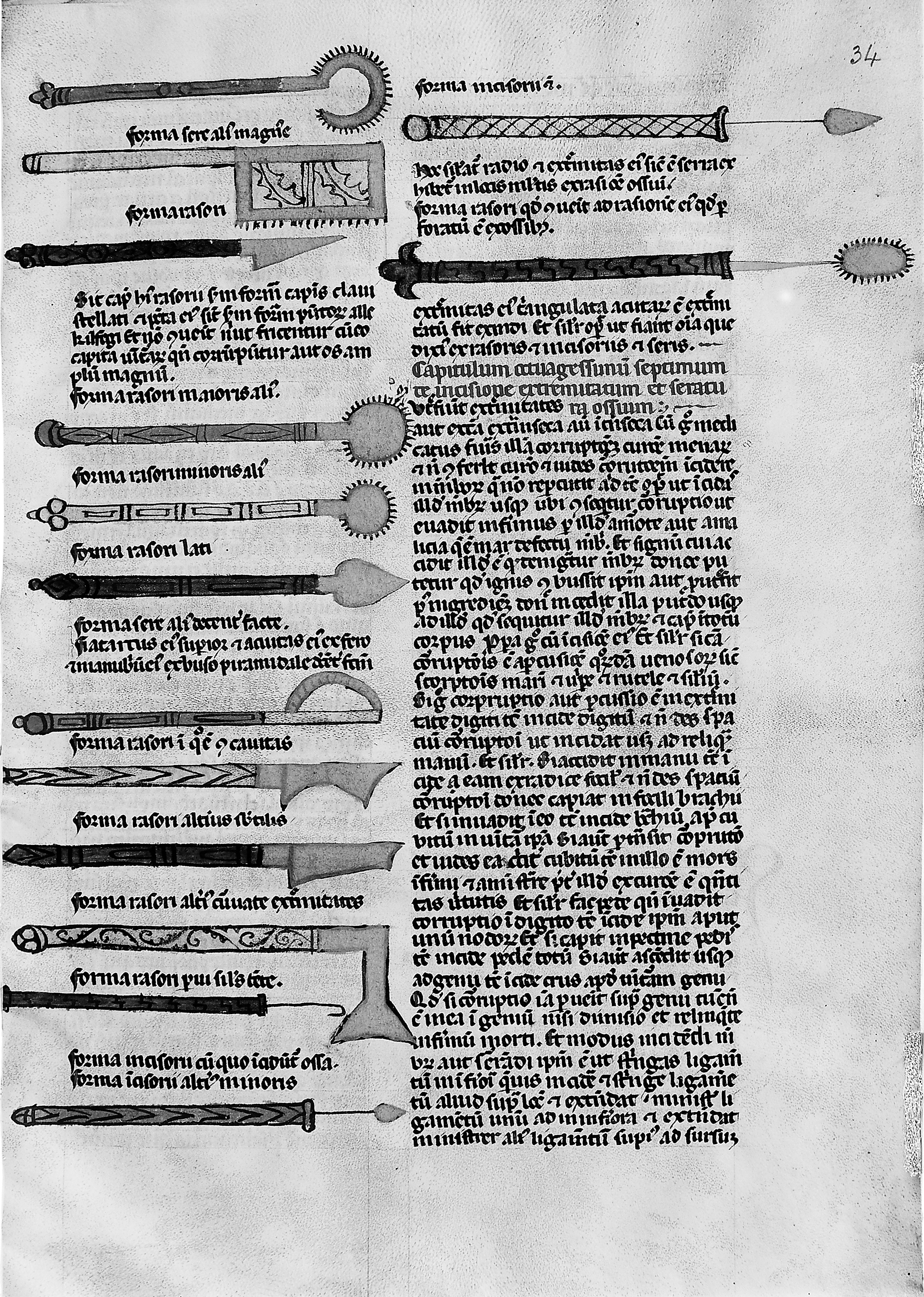

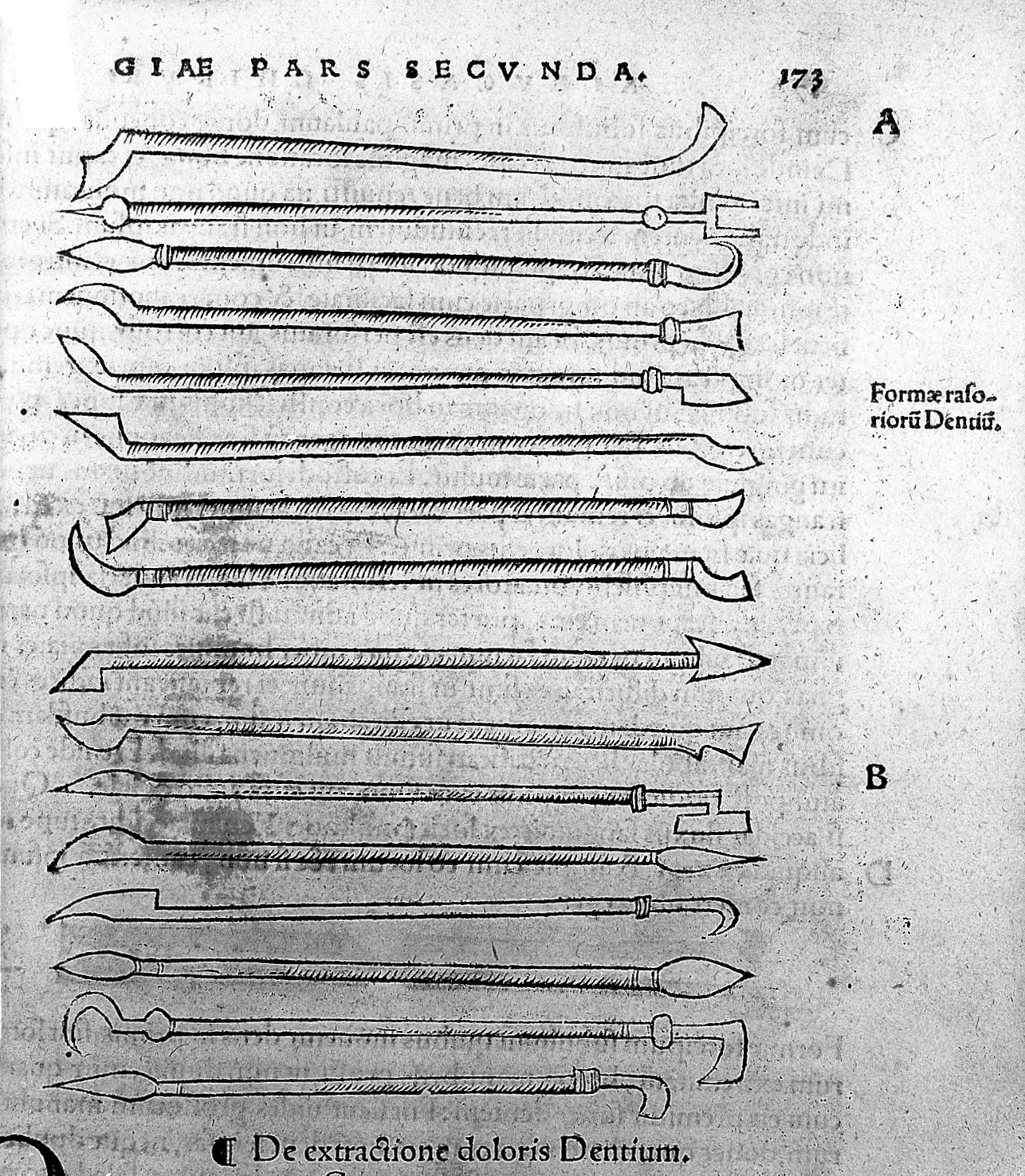

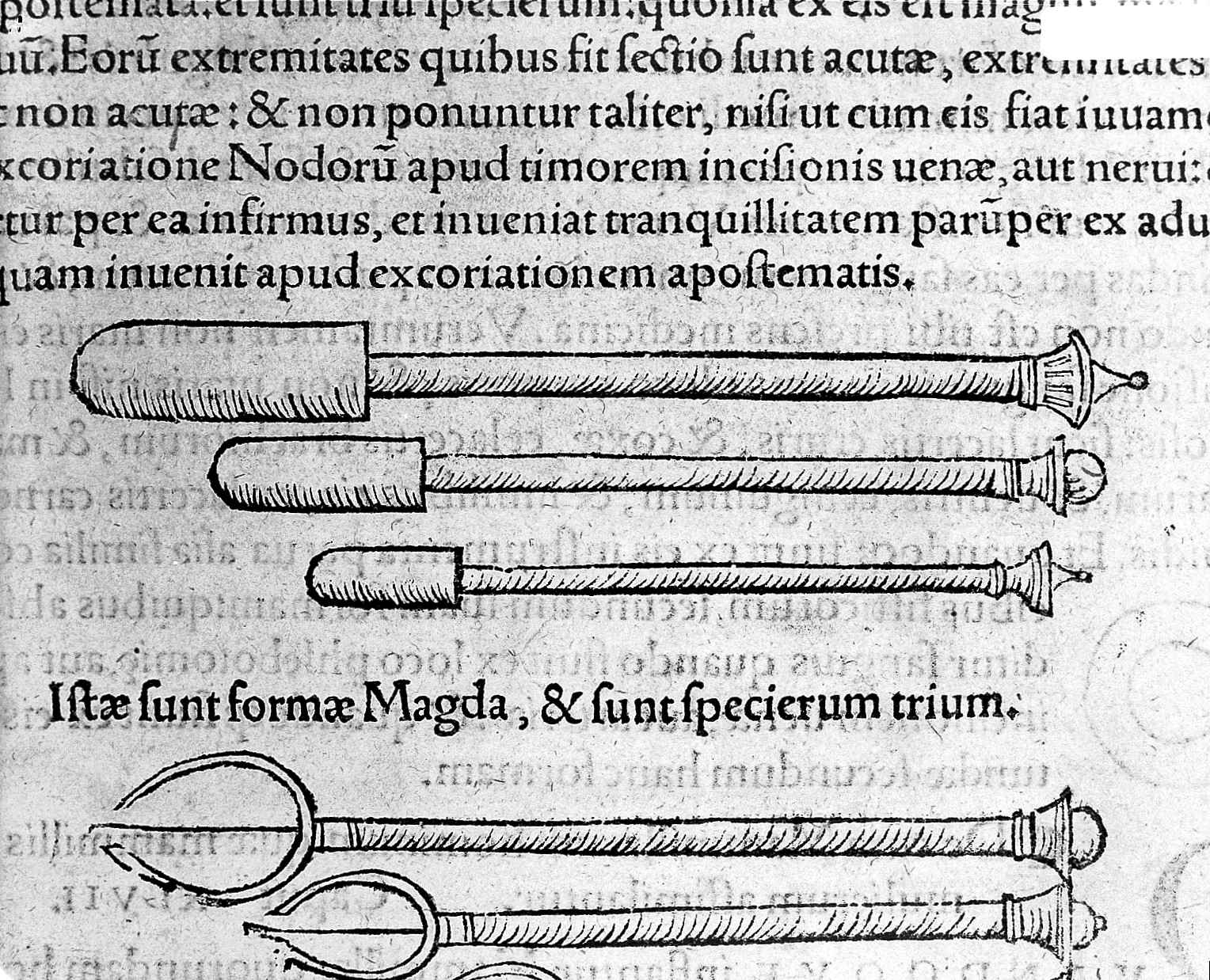

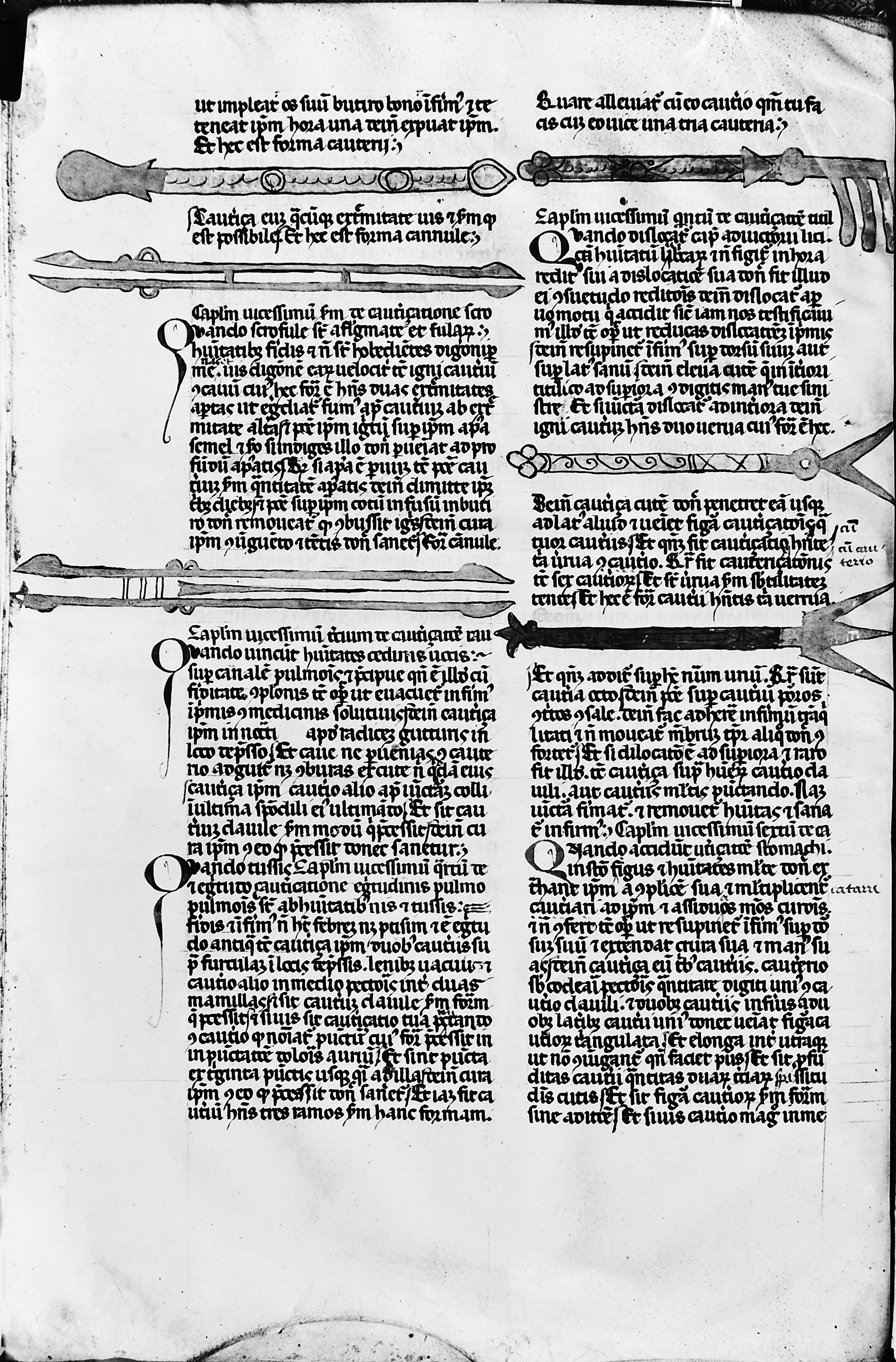

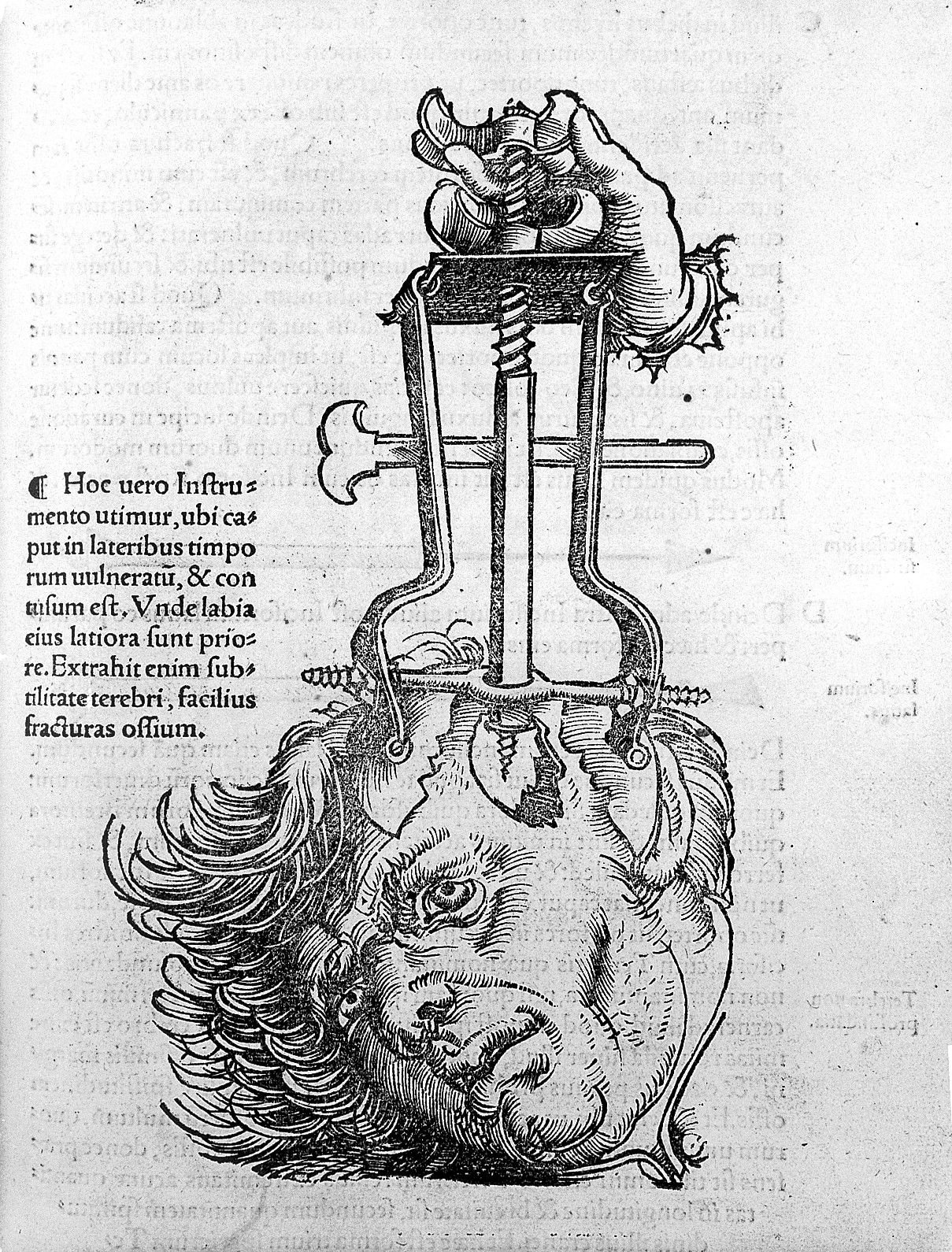

== See also ==
- Islamic medicine
- Islamic science
- List of Arab scientists and scholars
- Islamic Golden Age
- Islamic scholars
- Muslim inventions
- Timeline of historic inventions
- Avicenna

== Sources ==
- Al-Benna, Sammy (29 September 2011). "Albucasis, a tenth-century scholar, physician and surgeon: His role in the history of plastic and reconstructive surgery". European Journal of Plastic Surgery. 35 (5): 379–387. doi:10.1007/s00238-011-0637-3. S2CID 7297102.
- al-Zahrāwī, Abū al-Qāsim Khalaf ibn ʻAbbās (1973). مقالة في العمل باليد: A Definitive Edition of the Arabic Text. University of California Press. ISBN 978-0-520-01532-6.
- Arvide Cambra, Luisa Maria (1994). Un tratado de polvos medicinales en Al-Zahrawi. University of Almeria. ISBN 978-8482400020.
- Arvide Cambra, Luisa Maria (1996). Tratado de pastillas medicinales segْn Abulcasis. Junta de Andalucia. ISBN 978-8460554851.
- Arvide Cambra, Luisa Maria (2000). Un tratado de oftalmologيa en Abulcasis. University of Almeria. ISBN 978-8482402413.
- Arvide Cambra, Luisa Maria (2003). Un tratado de odontoestomatologيa en Abulcasis. University of Almeria. ISBN 978-8482406367.
- Arvide Cambra, Luisa Maria (2010). Un tratado de estética y cosmética en Abulcasis. Grupo Editorial Universitario (GEU). ISBN 9788499153421.
- Pormann, Peter E. (2004). The Oriental Tradition of Paul of Aegina's Pragmateia. BRILL. ISBN 9789004137578.
- Hamarneh, Sami Khalaf; Sonnedecker, Glenn Allen (1963). A Pharmaceutical View of Abulcasis Al-Zahrāwī in Moorish Spain: With Special Reference to the "Adhān,". Brill Archive.
- Facsimile of codex: Abu´l Qasim Halaf ibn Abbas al-Zahraui – Chirurgia; Vienna, Austrian National Library, Cod. Vindob. S. N. 2641, Southern Italy, second half of the 14th century, Akademische Druck- u. Verlagsanstalt (ADEVA) Graz 1979, Complete colour facsimile edition of the 166 pp. (78 fol. + 8 pp. + 2 pp.) in original size 405 x 280 mm. 227 smaller golden initial letters, 1 ornamental page, 1 pen drawing and 68 miniatures with illustrations from the medical sphere; text in Gothic Rotunda. Binding: Leather. All folios are cut according to the original. Commentary volume: E. Irblich, Vienna. 70 pp. text and 11 illustrations, cloth. Facsimile and commentary in a solid slip case. Limited edition: 960 numbered copies. CODICES SELECTI, Vol. LXVI
