= Lithotomy =

Surgical method for removal of calculi stones

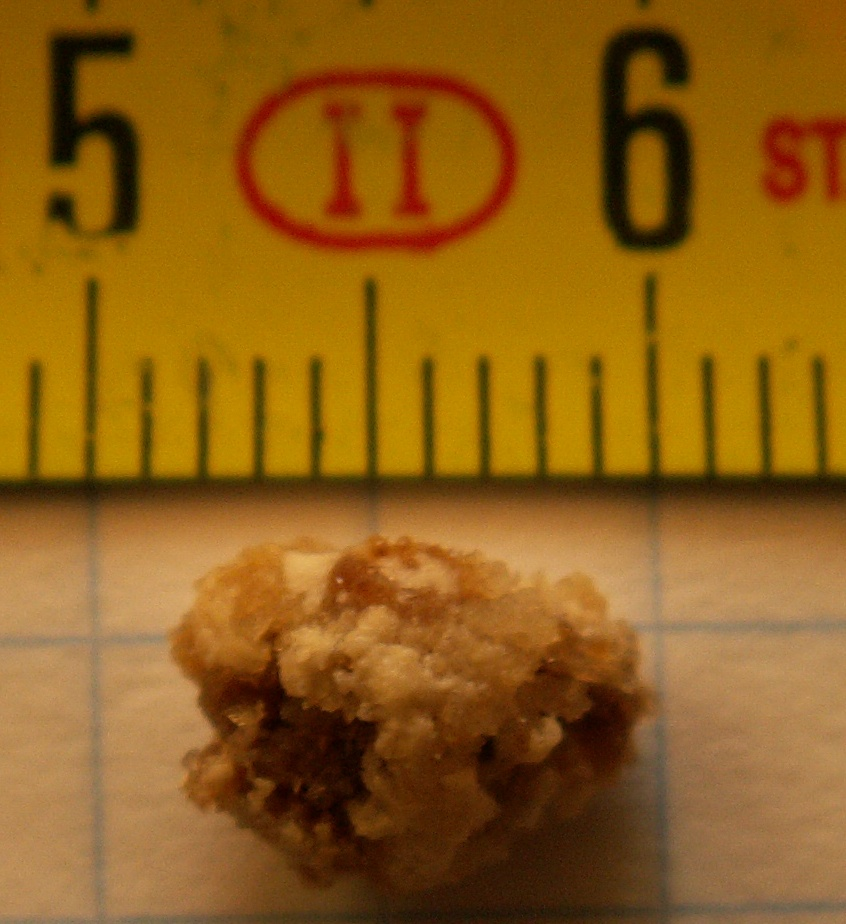
- A kidney stone, 8 millimetres (0.31 in) in diameter
- ICD-9-CM: 51.04 (gallbladder) 51.41 (common duct); 51.49, 51.96 (bile passage or hepatic duct); 55.01, 55.03 (kidney); 56.2 (ureter) 57.19 (urinary bladder)
- MeSH: D008096

Lithotomy from Greek for "lithos" (stone) and "tomos" (cut), is a surgical method for removal of calculi, stones formed inside certain organs, such as the urinary tract (kidney stones), bladder (bladder stones), and gallbladder (gallstones), that cannot exit naturally through the urinary system or biliary tract. The procedure is usually performed by means of a surgical incision (therefore invasive). Lithotomy differs from lithotripsy, where the stones are crushed either by a minimally invasive probe inserted through the exit canal, or by an acoustic pulse (extracorporeal shock wave lithotripsy), which is a non-invasive procedure. Because of these less invasive procedures, the use of lithotomy has decreased significantly in the modern era.

== History ==
=== Ancient history ===
Human beings have known of bladder stones for thousands of years, and have attempted to treat them for almost as long. The oldest bladder stone that has been found was discovered in Egypt in 1901, and it has been dated to 4900 BC. The earliest written records describing bladder stones are in papyrus dating from 1500 BC in Ancient Egypt. Disease caused by the formation of stones was described in Mesopotamia from 3200 to 1200 BC; the first description of a surgical procedure to treat stones was described in the Sushruta Samhita by Sushruta around 600 BC.

The presence of specialist lithotomists is described by Hippocrates, and is also included in the famous Hippocratic Oath: "I will not cut for stone, even for the patients in whom the disease is manifest; I will leave this operation to be performed by practitioners," a clear warning for physicians against the "cutting" of persons "laboring under the stone"; an act that was better left to surgeons, as distinct from physicians. Lithotomy at the time involved operations to remove bladder stones via the perineum; like other surgery before the invention of anesthesia, these were intensely painful for the patient, and since antibiotics were not yet available, often resulted in deadly infection and inflammation as well.

Ammonius, who practiced lithotomy in Alexandria circa 200 BC, coined the term lithotomy, and acquired the sobriquet Lithotomus from the instrument he developed for fragmenting stones too large to pass through a small perineal incision. He used a small hook to keep the stone in one position, and then a blunt instrument to crush it.

Aulus Cornelius Celsus (1st century), and the Hindu surgeon Susruta produced early descriptions of bladder stone treatment using perineal lithotomy. The 7th-century Byzantine Greek physician Paulus Aegineta's Medical Compendium in Seven Books contains a description of lithotomy that closely follows that of Celsus.

Albucasis in the tenth century AD describes a procedure different from previous ones, using an incision to the side of the midline, and with a knife that is "sharp on two sides" (Spinks and Lewis say it is difficult to reconcile the drawing of the knife to the procedure). Albucasis also adds using forceps instead of the scoop and chisel of Ammonius to break up the stone. Albucasis also uses a "drill" for stones impacted in the urethra, a technique not recorded earlier. Techniques described as similar to Albucasis' were seen for the next eight hundred years.

=== Middle Ages to modern times ===
Little changed in technique or instruments throughout the Middle Ages. Most lithotomists were commercial travellers, conducting procedures in places able to be attended by onlookers. In the 16th century, Laurent Colot and Pierre Franco (1505–1578) were pioneers in the suprapubic lithotomy method, in which an incision is made above the bladder. Frère Jacques Beaulieu (also known as Frère Jacques Baulot) developed an operation that went in laterally to remove the bladder stones in the late 16th century. Beaulieu was a travelling lithotomist and a Dominican Friar, with scant knowledge of anatomy. Beaulieu performed the procedure frequently in France into the late 16th century. A possible connection between the French nursery rhyme Frère Jacques and Frère Jacques Beaulieu, as claimed by Irvine Loudon and many others, was recently explored without finding any evidence for a connection. French composer Marin Marais wrote "Tableau de l'opération de la taille" ("tableau of a Lithotomy"), a musical description of the operation, in 1725.

A less invasive technique was described by Ottoman surgeons Sabuncuoğlu Serafettin and Ahi Ahmed Celebi in the sixteenth century, involving accessing the bladder through the urethra, and then washing it with fluid.

Lithotomy was successfully performed by some practitioners in the 17th century, for example Johann Andreas Eisenbarth (1663–1727). Other important names in its historical development were Jean Zuléma Amussat (1796–1856), Auguste Nélaton (1807–1873), Henry Thompson (1820–1904) and William Cheselden (1688–1752). The latter invented a technique for lateral vesical stone lithotomy in 1727, whereupon he was said to perform the operation in about one minute (an important feat before anesthesia).

In England, William Thornhill performed his first suprapubic operation on a boy privately on 3 February 1722 (O.S.; 14 February 1723 N.S.) The records of his work, published by his colleague, John Middleton, M.D., prove that his experience in the operation and his success were greater than any contemporary English surgeon could show.

Special surgical instruments were designed for lithotomy, consisting of dilators of the canal, forceps and tweezers, lithotomes (stone cutters) and cystotomes (bladder cutters), urethrotomes (for incisions of the urethra) and conductors (grooved probes used as guides for stone extraction). The patient is placed in a special position on a lithotomy operating table, called the lithotomy position (which retains this name to the present day, when the same position is used for other unrelated medical procedures).

=== Move to less invasive procedures ===
Transurethral lithotripsy, which was much simpler and with lower morbidity, complication and mortality rates, was invented by French surgeon Jean Civiale (1792–1867) and largely substituted for surgical lithotomy, unless the crushing of calculi was difficult or impossible.
