= Charles Louis Stanislas Heurteloup =

French physician

Charles Louis Stanislas Heurteloup (16 February 1793, in Paris – 1864) was a French medical doctor. He was the son of military physician Nicolas Heurteloup (1750–1812).

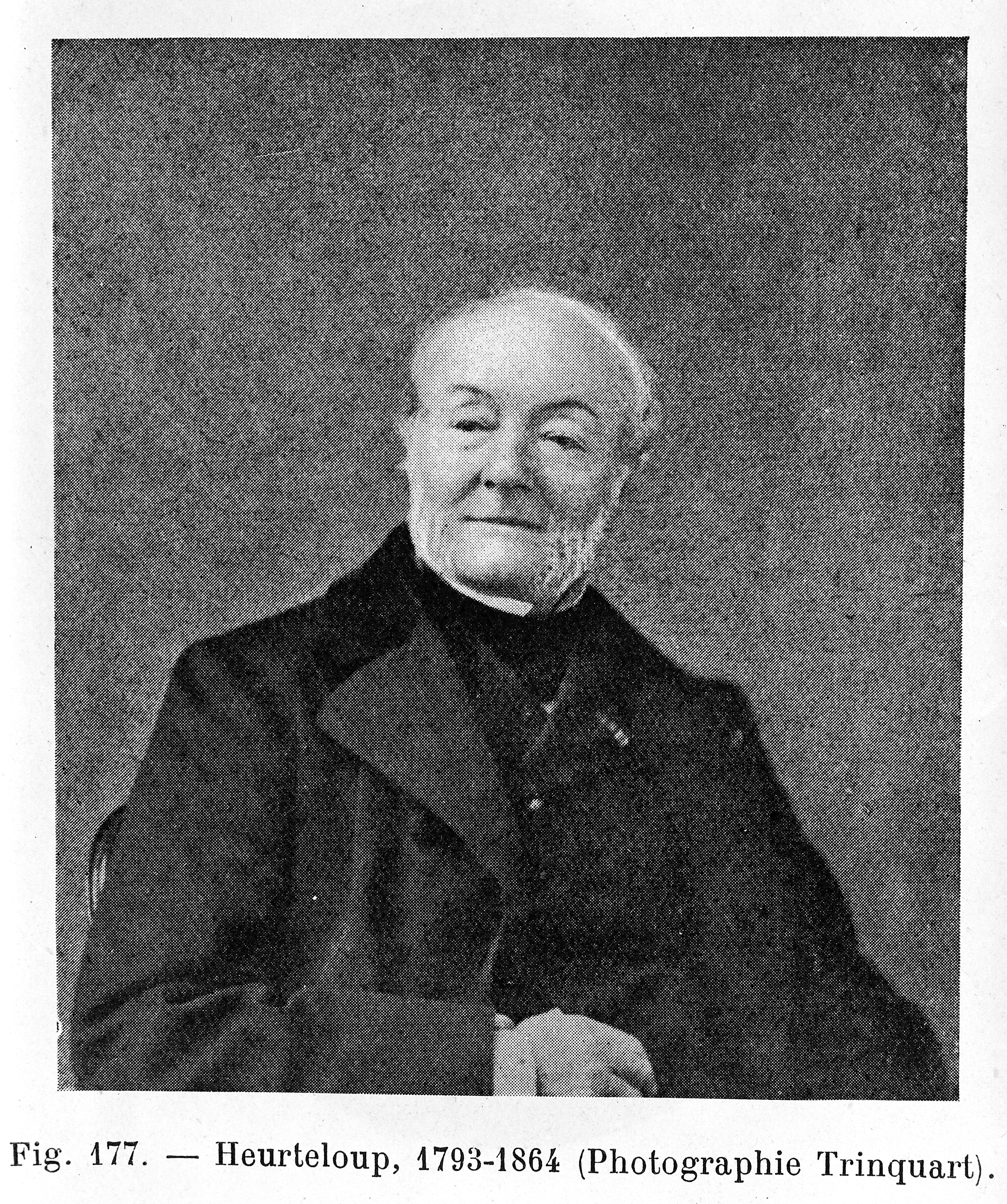
Charles Louis Stanislaus Heurteloup

He studied medicine in Paris, where he obtained his degree in 1823. He is credited for making improvements to instruments used in lithotripsy. Among his inventions was a lithotrite known as a percuteur courbe a marteau.

In Paris, he had as antagonists, fellow lithotritists Jean Civiale (1792–1867) and Jean-Jacques-Joseph Leroy d'Etiolles (1798–1860). In 1829, he traveled to England, where he performed the country's first lithotrity. While in London, he published "Principles of lithotrity" (1831).

Heurteloup also invented an "artificial leech", a device used to bleed sensitive regions around the eyes or the temples.

== Selected writings ==
- "Principles of lithotrity or a Treatise on the art of extracting the stone without incision..."; London : Wittaker, Treacher, and Co., 1831.
- Lithotripsie : mémoires sur la lithotripsie par percussion, 1833 - Lithotripsy: memoirs of lithotripsy with percussion.
- Rétrécissements de l'urèthre, 1855 - Strictures of the urethra.
