= Laser surgery =

Medical use of laser to cut tissues

- MeSH: D053685

Laser surgery is a type of surgery that cuts tissue using a laser in contrast to using a scalpel.

Soft-tissue laser surgery is used in a variety of applications in humans (general surgery, neurosurgery, ENT, dentistry, orthodontics, and oral and maxillofacial surgery) as well as veterinary surgical fields. The primary uses of lasers in soft tissue surgery are to cut, ablate, vaporize, and coagulate. There are several different laser wavelengths used in soft tissue surgery. Different laser wavelengths and device settings (such as pulse duration and power) produce different effects on the tissue. Some commonly used lasers types in soft tissue surgery include erbium, diode, and CO_{2}. Erbium lasers are excellent cutters, but provide minimal hemostasis. Diode lasers (hot tip) provide excellent hemostasis, but are slow cutters. CO_{2} lasers are both efficient at cutting and coagulating. Laser surgery is commonly used on the eye. Techniques used include LASIK, which is used to correct near and far-sightedness in vision, and photorefractive keratectomy, a procedure which permanently reshapes the cornea using an excimer laser to remove a small amount of the human tissue.

== Effects ==
1. Photochemical effect: clinically referred to as photodynamic therapy. Photosensitizer (photophrin II) is administered which is taken up by the tumor tissue and later irradiated by laser light resulting in highly toxic substances with resultant necrosis of the tumor. Photodynamic therapy is used in palliation of oesophageal and bronchial carcinoma and ablation of mucosal cancers of Gastrointestinal tract and urinary bladder.
2. Photoablative effect: Used in eye surgeries like refractive surgery, band keratoplasty, and endartectomy of peripheral blood vessels.
3. Photothermal effect: this property is used for endoscopic control of bleeding e.g. Bleeding peptic ulcers, oesophageal varices
4. Photomechanical effect: used in intraluminal lithotripsy

== Equipment ==
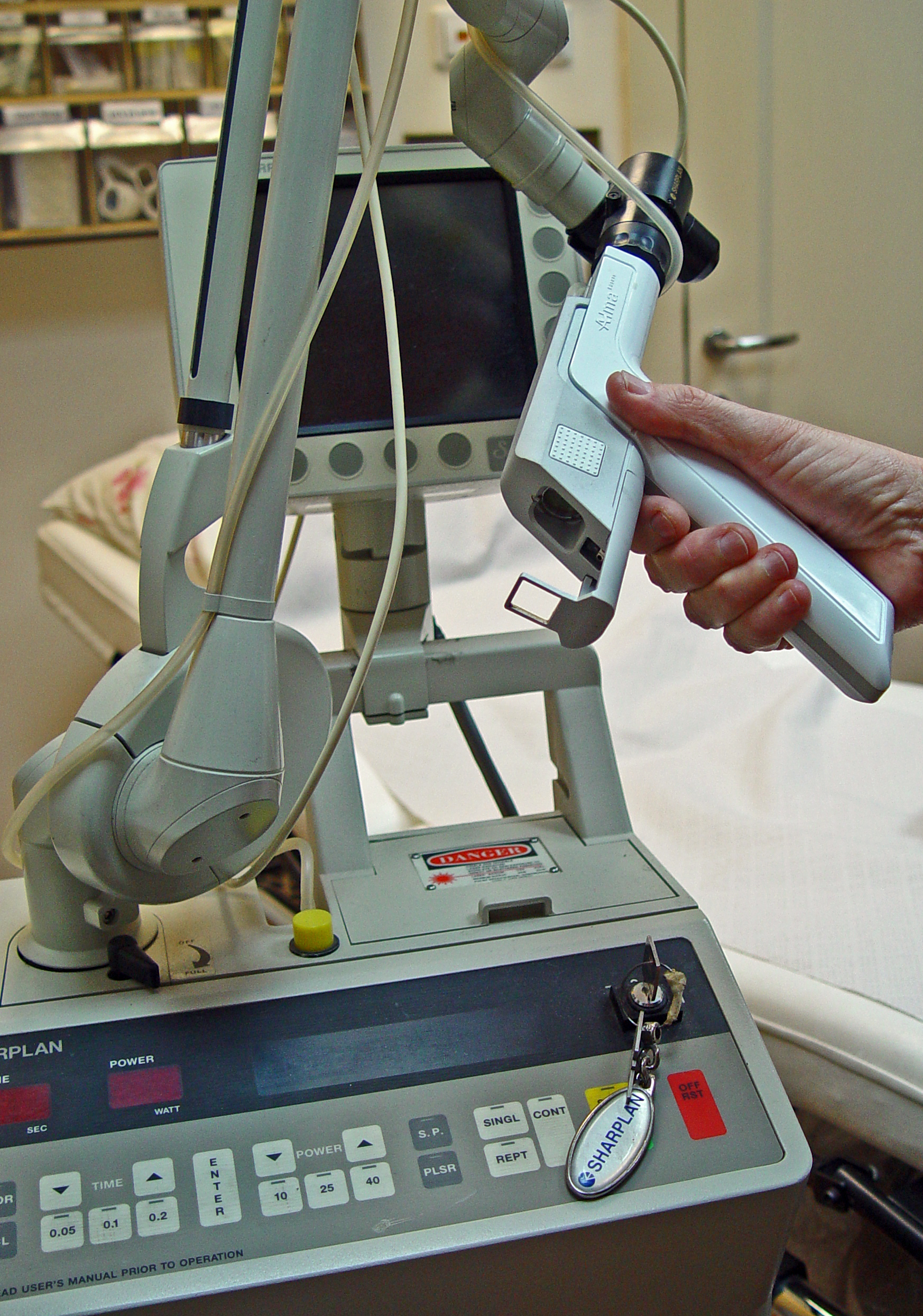
A 40 watt CO_{2} laser used for soft-tissue laser surgery

Surgical laser systems, sometimes called "laser scalpels", are differentiated not only by the wavelength, but also by the light delivery system: flexible fiber or articulated arm, as well as by other factors. Types of surgical lasers include carbon dioxide, argon, Nd:YAG laser, and potassium titanyl phosphate. CO_{2} lasers were the dominant soft-tissue surgical lasers as of 2010.

== Applications ==
=== Dermatology and plastic surgery ===
A range of lasers such as erbium, dye, Q switch lasers, and CO_{2} are used to treat various skin conditions including scars, vascular and pigmented lesions, and for photorejuvenation. The laser surgery for dermatology often bypasses the skin surface. The principle of laser surgery for dermatologic problems is based on SPTL (selective photothermolysis). The laser beam penetrates the skin until it encounters chromophore which absorbs the laser beam. After absorption of the laser beam, heat is generated to induce coagulation, necrosis of the targeted tissue, this results in the removal of unwanted tissue by laser surgery.

Laser resurfacing is a technique in which covalent bonds of a material are dissolved by a laser, a technique invented by aesthetic plastic surgeon Thomas L. Roberts, III using CO_{2} lasers in the 1990s.

Lasers are also used for laser-assisted lipectomy.

=== Eye surgery ===
Various types of laser surgery are used to treat refractive error. LASIK, in which a knife is used to cut a flap in the cornea, and a laser is used to reshape the layers underneath, is used to treat refractive error. IntraLASIK is a variant in which the flap is also cut with a laser. In photorefractive keratectomy (PRK, LASEK), the cornea is reshaped without first cutting a flap. In laser thermal keratoplasty, a ring of concentric burns is made in the cornea, which causes its surface to steepen, allowing better near vision. ReLEx SMILE is the latest advancement in laser vision correction technology. In SMILE surgery, ZEISS VisuMax femtosecond laser is used to make a small incision and to create a pre-calculated mini lens tissue (or lenticule) inside the cornea.

Lasers are also used to treat non-refractive conditions, such as phototherapeutic keratectomy (PTK) in which opacities and surface irregularities are removed from the cornea and laser coagulation in which a laser is used to cauterize blood vessels in the eye, to treat various conditions. Lasers can be used to repair tears in the retina.

=== Endovascular surgery ===
Laser endarterectomy is a technique in which an entire atheromatous plaque in the artery is excised. Other applications include laser assisted angioplasties and laser-assisted vascular anastomosis.

=== Foot and ankle surgery ===
Lasers are used to treat several disorders in foot and ankle surgery. They are used to remove benign and malignant tumors, treat bunions, debride ulcers and burns, excise epidermal nevi, blue rubber bleb nevi, and keloids, and the removal of hypertrophic scars and tattoos.

A carbon dioxide laser (CO_{2}) is used in surgery to treat onychocryptosis (ingrown nails), onychauxis (club nails), onychogryposis (rams horn nail), and onychomycosis (fungus nail).

=== Gastro-intestinal tract ===
Laser photoablation is can be used to treat Peptic ulcer disease and oesophageal varices. Laser surgery used in hemorrhoidectomy, and is a relatively popular and non-invasive method of hemorrhoid removal. Laser-assisted liver resections have been done using carbon dioxide and Nd:YAG lasers. Endoscopic laser lithotripsy is a safer modality compared to electrohydraulic lithotripsy. Lasers can be used to treat Coagulation of vascular malformations of stomach, duodenum, and colon.

Laser can be effective in treating several forms of cancer: Lasers can be effectively used to treat early gastric cancers provided they are less than 4 cm and without lymph node involvement. Lasers are also used in treating oral submucous fibrosis. Palliative laser therapy is given in advanced oesophageal cancers with obstruction of lumen. Recanalisation of the lumen is done which allows the patient to resume a soft diet and maintain hydration. Ablative laser therapy is used in advanced colorectal cancers to relieve obstruction and to control bleeding. The ablation of liver tumors can be achieved by selective photovaporization of the tumor.

=== Oral and dental surgery ===
The CO_{2} laser is used in oral and dental surgery for virtually all soft-tissue procedures, such as gingivectomies, vestibuloplasties, frenectomies, and operculectomies. The CO_{2} 10,600 nm wavelength is safe around implants as it is reflected by titanium, and thus has been gaining popularity in the field of periodontology. The laser may also be effective in treating peri-implantitis.

=== Spine surgery ===
Laser spine surgery first began seeing clinical use in the 1980s and was primarily used within discectomy to treat lumbar disc disease under the notion that heating a bulging disc vaporized enough tissue to relieve pressure on the nerves and help alleviate pain.

Since that time, laser spine surgery has become one of the most marketed forms of minimally invasive spine surgery, despite the fact that it has never been studied in a controlled clinical trial to determine its effectiveness apart from disc decompression. Evidence-based data surrounding the use of lasers in spine surgery is limited and its safety and efficacy were poorly understood as of 2017.

=== Thoracic surgery ===
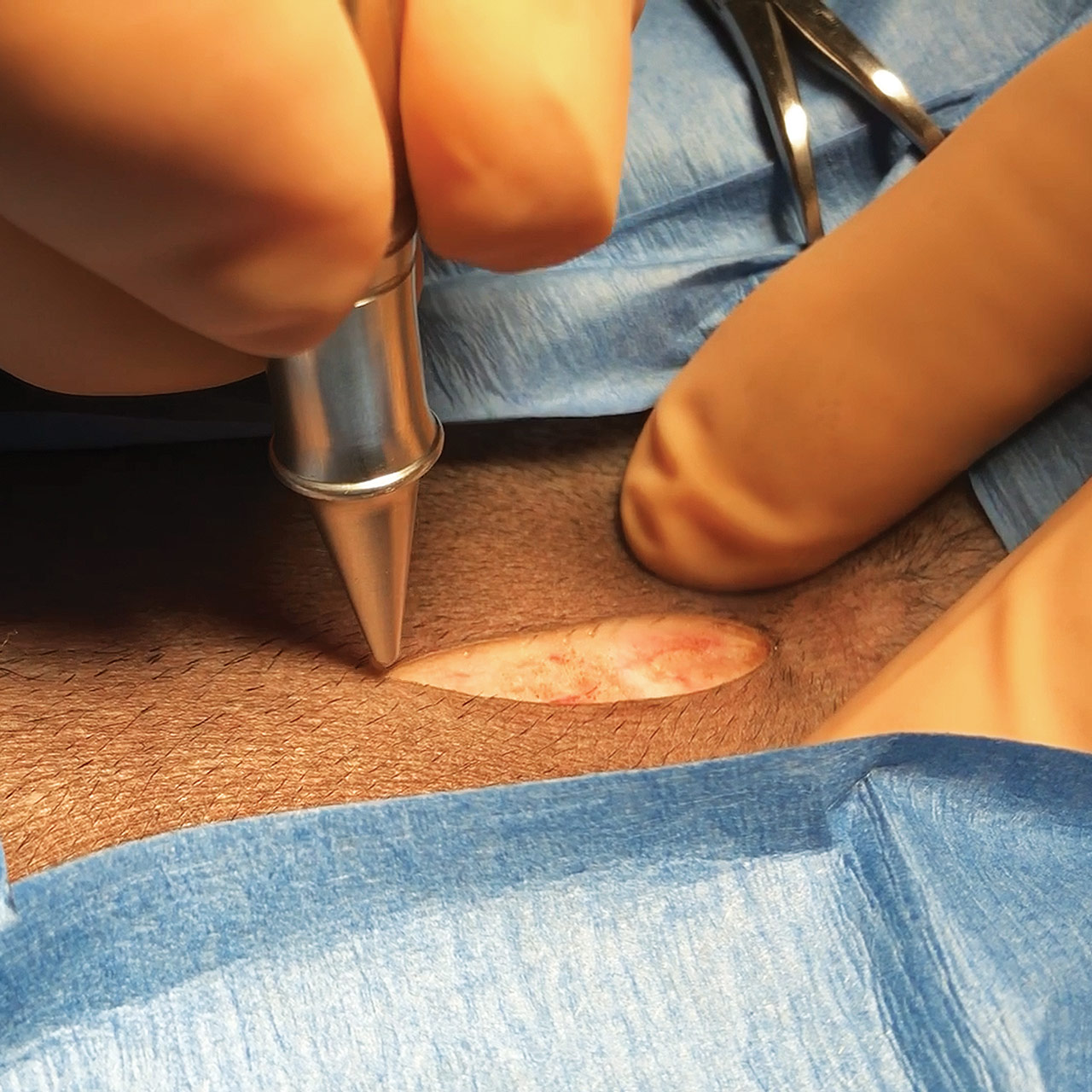
Abdominal incision created with a LightScalpel 10,600 nm CO_{2} laser handpiece, demonstrating a precise, bloodless tissue cut in the lower abdomen

In thoracic surgery, surgical laser applications are most often used to remove pulmonary metastases and tumors of different primary localizations. Other areas of application are surgical sectioning of the parenchyma, anatomic segmental resections, removal of tumors from the thoracic wall and abrasion of the pleura parietalis. Since the introduction of surgical lasers, the amount of potentially surgically resectable pulmonary nodules has significantly increased. Compared to laser surgery, other conventional surgical methods such as segmental or wedge resections with surgical stapling will normally lead to a bigger loss of lung tissue, especially in patients with multiple pulmonary nodules methods.

Other advantages of laser surgery compared to conventional methods are that it leads to an improved postoperative lung function and that it gives the additional possibility to histologically analyze the removed material which would otherwise be destroyed through radiation or heat.

=== Hard tissues ===
Lasers are used to cut or ablate bones and teeth in dentistry.

=== Other surgery ===
The CO_{2} laser is also used in gynecology, genitourinary, general surgery, otorhinolaryngology, orthopedic, and neurosurgery.
