= Jean Zuléma Amussat =

French surgeon (1796–1856)

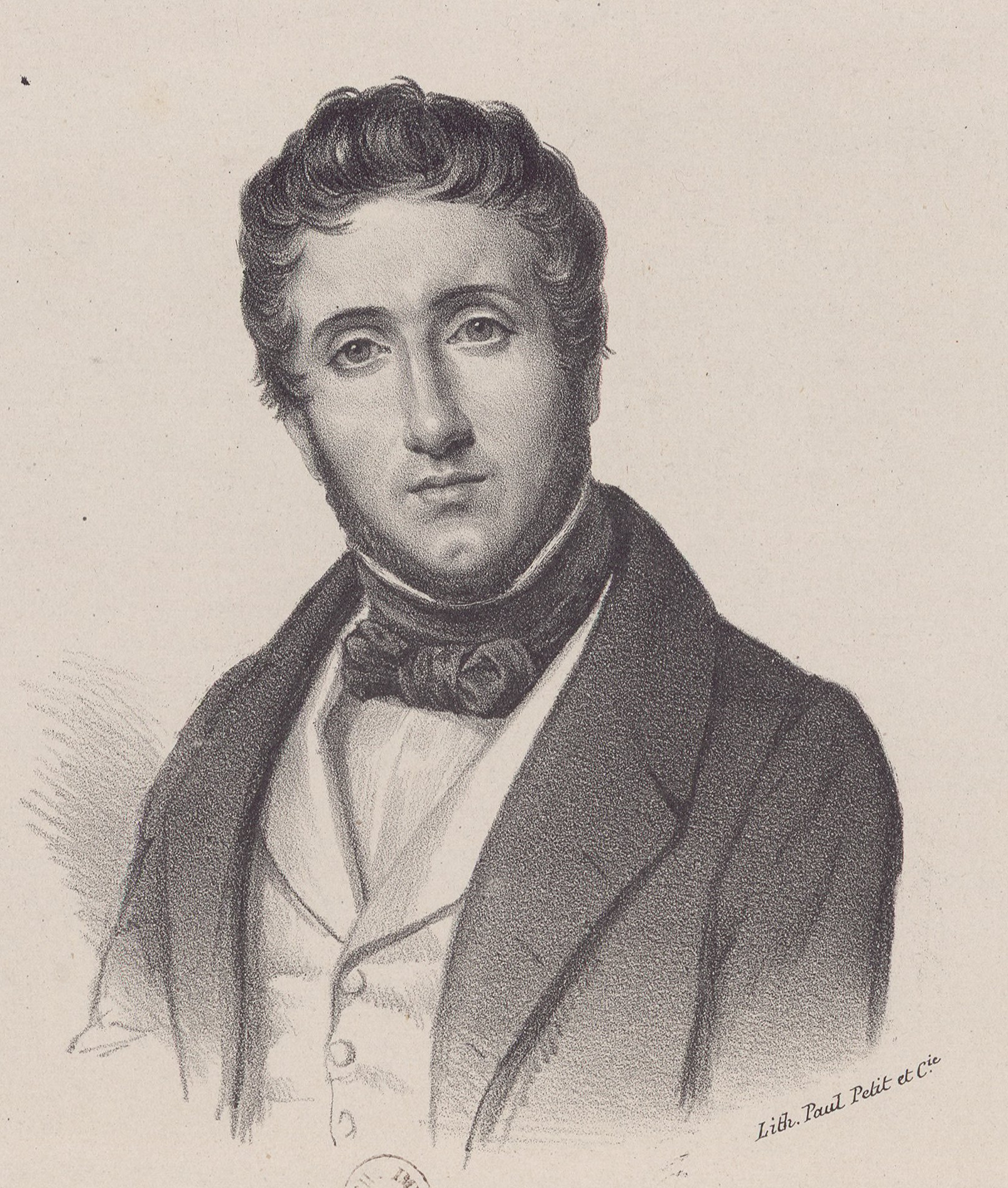
Jean Zuléma Amussat

Jean Zuléma Amussat (21 November 1796 – 13 May 1856) was a French surgeon.

Amussat was born in Saint-Maixent, Deux-Sèvres. He became a renowned physician whose primary contributions were in the field of genitourinary surgery. Most of his work was through a private practice he held in Paris. He is remembered for the eponymous "Amussat's method" or "torsion of the arteries", which is a procedure used to arrest arterial hemorrhaging. He was also an early practitioner of lithotripsy, which was a "minimally invasive" surgery to crush stones inside the bladder via the urethra. This operation necessitated use of a recently invented device known as a lithotrite.

Amussat has several eponyms related to him:

- Amussat's fold: abnormal folds of the membranous urethra at the level of the seminal colliculus.
- Amussat's method: torsion of the arteries to prevent arterial hemorrhaging.
- Amussat's operation: extraperitoneal colostomy in the lumbar region for obstruction of the colon.
- Amussat's valves: Spiral valves within the cystic duct. The cystic duct is the anatomical structure that joins the gall bladder to the common bile duct.

== Partial bibliography ==
- Note sur la possibilité de sonder l'urètre de l'homme avec une sonde tout-à-fait droite, sans blesser le canal; ce qui à donné l'idée d'extraire les petits calculs urinaires encore contenus dans la vessie, et de briser le gros avec la pince d Hunter modifiée. Nouveau journal de médecine, T. 13, 1822. On lithotripsy.
- Quelques considérations sur l'étude de l'anatomie. Thèse. 33 pages. Paris, 1826, No. 186. – On the use of animal experiments in physiology.
- Sur les sondes urétrales. 1827. – On urethral sounds.
- Lithotritie et lithotomie. 1827 – On lithotripsy and lithotomy.
- Torsion des artères; Archives générales de médecine, Paris, 1829, 20: 606–610.
- "Amussat's lessons on retention of urine, caused by strictures of the urethra, and on the diseases of the urethra". Edited by A. Petit. Translated from the French by James P. Jervey, M. D. 3 p. 1., 246 pages. Charleston, S. C. J. Dowling, 1836.
