= Heurteloup =

Heurteloup is a surname. Notable people with the surname include:

- Charles Louis Stanislas Heurteloup (1793–1864), French physician
- Nicolas Heurteloup (1750–1812), French military physician and surgeon
