= List of honorary citizens of Gdańsk =

Coat of arms of Gdańsk

The title of an honorary citizen of Gdańsk (Polish: Honorowy Obywatel Gdańska) is conferred by the city authorities to persons who made significant contributions to the city of Gdańsk, irrespective of their place of birth or nationality. The first historically documented person who received the title was Wilhelm Baum in 1832. The legal basis for conferring this honour was the Prussian Act on Local Government from 1831, which introduced the term of an honorary citizen.

In the period of the Free City of Gdańsk (1918–1945) and the Communist State (1945–1989) the title of an honorary citizen of Gdańsk was awarded to a number of controversial figures such as Adolf Hitler, Hermann Göring and Bolesław Bierut. All these titles were subsequently revoked by the City Council after the end of the Second World War (this also included titles granted during the Prussian rule) and after the collapse of communism in Poland.

The title is purely symbolic and the recipients do not receive any financial awards. In the past, the recipients received a diploma and the city usually organized a ceremonial banquet to honour those who received the title.

== List ==
Recipients of the honorary citizenship of Gdańsk (Polish: Honorowi obywatele Gdańska), in order of date of presentation:

=== Prussia ===
1. Wilhelm Baum (1832, revoked)
2. Johann Karl Rothe (1841, revoked)
3. Jakob Friedrich Rüchel-Kleist (1842, revoked)
4. Paul W. Wundsch (1847, revoked)
5. Adolf Heinrich von Grabow (1849, revoked)
6. Stanisław Kostka Rosołkiewicz (1849, revoked)
7. Emil Friedrich Götz (1849, revoked)
8. Otto von Manteuffel (1853, revoked)
9. Friedrich Wilhelm Clausewitz (1856, revoked)
10. Robert Ludwig Blumenthal (1863, revoked)
11. Matthias Gotthilf Löschin (1865, revoked)
12. Eduard Friedrich Wiebe (1885, revoked)
13. Karl Adolf Ernsthausen (1888, revoked)
14. Leopold von Winter (1890, revoked)
15. Julius Albert Licht (1893, revoked)
16. Leo von Caprivi (1894, revoked)
17. Heinrich Rickert (1895, revoked)
18. Otto Steffens (1896, revoked)
19. Richard Damme (1897, revoked)
20. Georg Friedrich Abegg (1898, revoked)
21. Gustav Heinrich von Gossler (1899, revoked)
22. Emil Berenz (1903, revoked)
23. Paul von Beneckendorff Hindenburg (1915, revoked)
24. August Anton Ludwig von Mackensen (1915, revoked)

=== Free City 1918-1945 ===
1. Max Halbe (1925–1945, revoked)
2. Albert Forster (1933–1945, revoked)
3. Adolf Hitler (1939–1945, revoked)
4. Hermann Göring (1943–1945, revoked)

=== Communist State ===
1. Bolesław Bierut (1947–1990, revoked)
2. Konstanty Rokossowski (1949–1990, revoked)
3. Paweł Batow (1965–1990, revoked)
4. Wiktor Kulikow (1977–1990, revoked)

=== Third Polish Republic ===
1. Günter Grass (1993)
2. Hans Lothar Fauth (1994)
3. Gerard Labuda (1994)
4. Ignacy Adamczewski (1994)
5. Hans Koschnick (1994)
6. George H. W. Bush (1997)
7. Richard von Weizsäcker (1997)
8. Lech Wałęsa (1997)
9. Marian Kołodziej (1997)
10. Ryszard Kukliński (1998)
11. Westerplatte heroes (1998)
12. Defence of the Polish Post Office in Danzig heroes (1998)
13. Lech Bądkowski (2000)
14. Henryka Krzywonos (2000)
15. Jerzy Borowczak (2000)
16. Stefan Lewandowski (2000)
17. Bogdan Borusewicz (2000)
18. Bogdan Lis (2000)
19. Joanna Duda-Gwiazda (2000)
20. Alina Pienkowska (2000)
21. Bogdan Felski (2000)
22. Ludwik Prądzyński (2000)
23. Wojciech Gruszecki (2000)
24. Józef Przybylski (2000)
25. Andrzej Gwiazda (2000)
26. Jerzy Sikorski (2000)
27. Stefan Izdebski (2000)
28. Lech Sobieszek (2000)
29. Jerzy Kmiecik (2000)
30. Tadeusz Stanny (2000)
31. Zdzisław Kobyliński (2000)
32. Anna Walentynowicz (2000, rejected)
33. Andrzej Kołodziej (2000)
34. Florian Wiśniewski (2000)
35. Henryk Jankowski (2000)
36. Margaret Thatcher (2000)
37. Ronald Reagan (2000)
38. Andrzej Januszajtis (2000)
39. Henryk Jankowski (2000, revoked in 2019)
40. Zbigniew Brzeziński (2002)
41. Jan Nowak-Jeziorański (2002)
42. Dieter Schenk (2003)
43. Zygmunt Chychła (2003)
44. Stanisław Bogdanowicz (2004)
45. Jean Michel Jarre (2005)
46. Ryszard Kaczorowski (2008)
47. Helmut Kohl (2009)
48. Tadeusz Mazowiecki (2009)
49. Ludwik Wiśniewski (2011)
50. Andrzej Zbierski (2011)
51. Andrzej Wajda (2016)
52. Tadeusz Gocłowski (2016)
53. Joanna Muszkowska-Penson (2018)
54. Halina Winiarska-Kiszkis (2020)
55. Jerzy Kiszkis (2020)
56. Danuta Wałęsa (2022)
57. Jerzy Owsiak (2024)
