= Frère Jacques Beaulieu =

French Dominican friar and lithotomist (1651–1720)

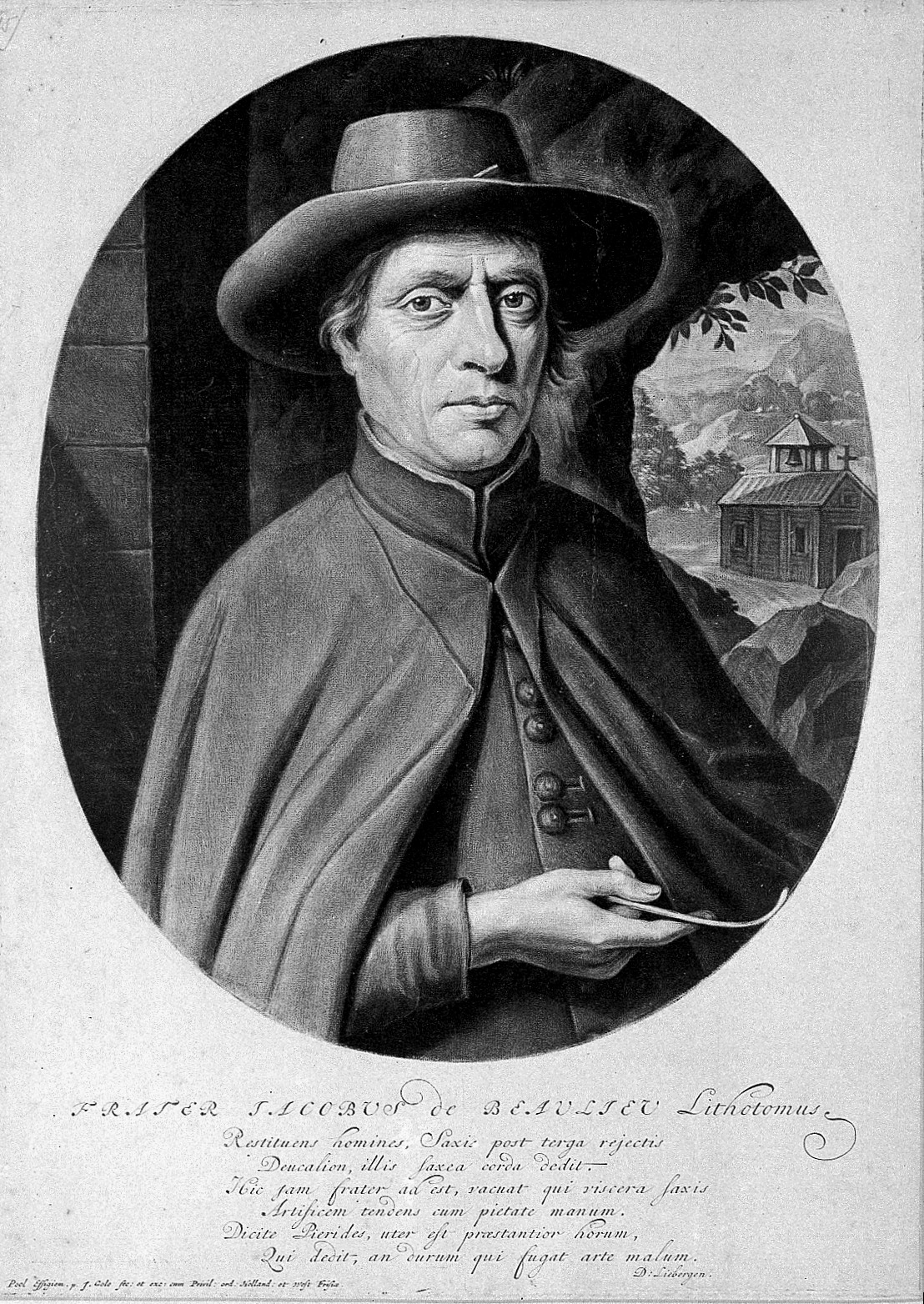
Frère Jacques Beaulieu

Frère Jacques Beaulieu, OP (French pronunciation: [fʁɛʁ ʒɑk boljø]); 1651–1720), also known as Frère Jacques Baulot, was a Dominican friar and travelling lithotomist with scant knowledge of anatomy. Beaulieu performed the frequently-deadly procedure in France into the early 18th century.

The urologic community often claims Beaulieu is subject of the French nursery rhyme Frère Jacques (also known in English as Brother John), but this is not well-established. A possible connection between Frère Jacques and Beaulieu, as claimed by Irvine Loudon and many others, was explored by J. P. Ganem and C. C. Carson without finding any evidence for a connection.

Some have suggested that Frère Jacques was instead written to mock the Jacobin monks of France (Jacobins are what the Dominicans are called in Paris).
