= LLT =

LLT may refer to:

- Laser lithotripsy, a surgical procedure to remove urinary stones
- LLT GM High Feature engine, a type of engine
- Lucas–Lehmer primality test for Mersenne numbers
- Cholesky decomposition, an algorithm to decompose matrix A into a lower Matrix L : A = LL^{T}.
- Linus Media Group, a tech media group based in canada.
