= William Thornhill =

William Thornhill may refer to:

- William Thornhill (British Army officer) (1768-1851), British Army officer
- William Thornhill (MP for Poole) (1500–1557), English politician
- William Thornhill (surgeon), English surgeon
- William Pole Thornhill (1807–1876), British politician, MP for North Derbyshire
