= Jean-Jacques-Joseph Leroy d'Etiolles =

French surgeon (1798–1860)

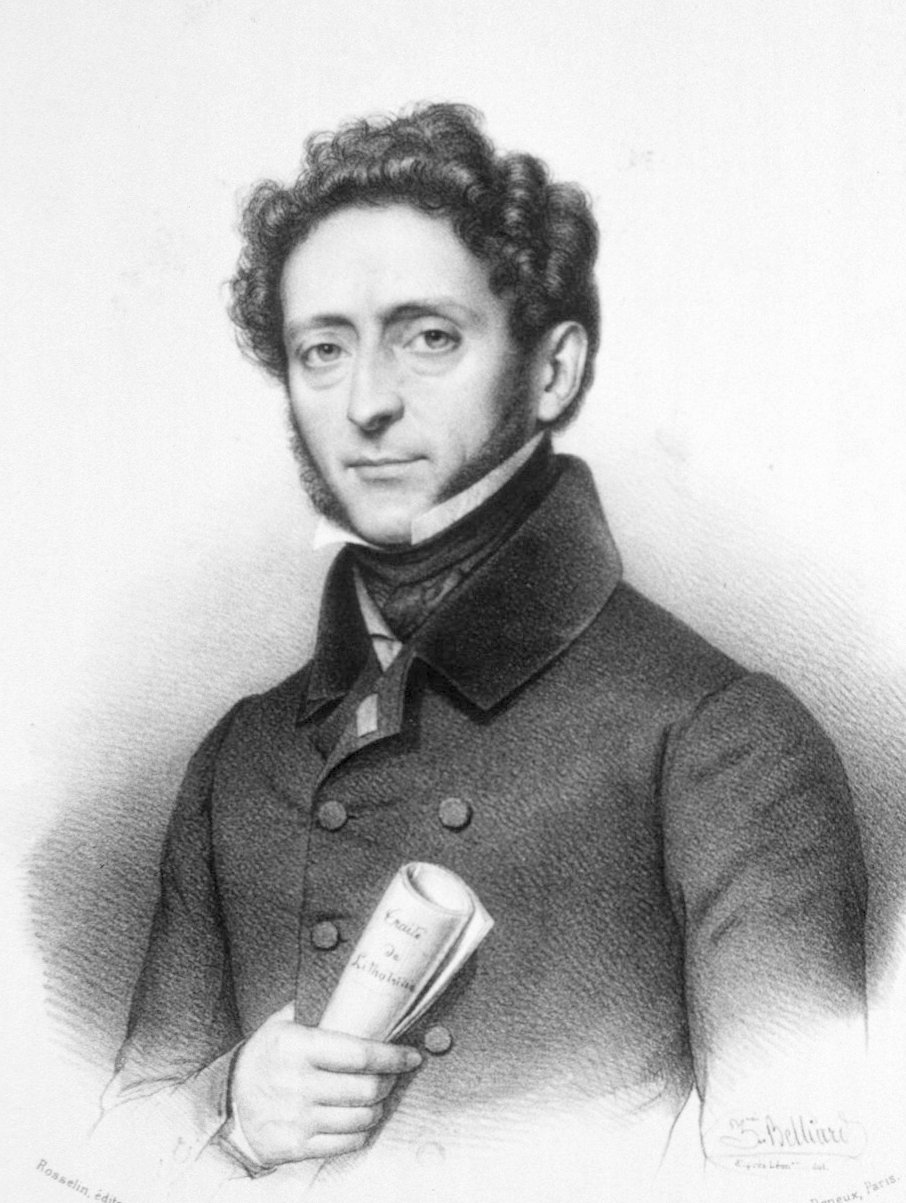
Jean-Jacques-Joseph Leroy d'Etiolles

Jean-Jacques-Joseph Leroy d'Etiolles (5 April 1798 in Paris – 25 August 1860) was a French surgeon who studied and practiced medicine in Paris.

He is credited with the invention of numerous medical devices, including a lithotriptic instrument (1822), that was improved upon and put to successful use by Jean Civiale (1792–1867) soon afterwards. He is also known for pioneer experiments involving barotrauma produced by mechanical ventilation.

== Written works ==
- Recherches expérimentales sur l’asphyxie, lues à l’Académie des sciences (1829) – Experimental studies on asphyxia, read at the Academy of Sciences.
- Réponse aux lettres de M. Civiale sur la lithotritie (1831) – Response to letters from Jean Civiale in regards to lithotripsy.
- Sur l'opération du broiement appliquée aux calculs existans avec une rétention d'urine et sur les moyens de faire sortir artificiellement les fragments de pierre (1832)
- De la lithotripsie (1836) – About lithotripsy.
- Histoire de la lithotritie, précédée de Réflexions sur la dissolution des calculs urinaires (1839) – History of the lithotrite preceded by reflections on the dissolution of urinary stones.
- Lettre à l'Academie de médecine en réponse au rapport sur la question de la dissolution des calculs urinaires par l'eau de Vichy (1839) – Letter to the Academy of Medicine in response to the report involving dissolution of urinary calculi by Vichy water.
- Considérations anatomiques et chirurgicales sur la prostate (1840) – Anatomical and surgical considerations involving the prostate.
- Mémoire sur des moyens nouveaux de traitement des fistules vésico-vaginales (1842) --Memoirs on new means for treatment of vesico-vaginal fistula.
