= Wilhelm Baum (surgeon) =

German surgeon (1799–1883)

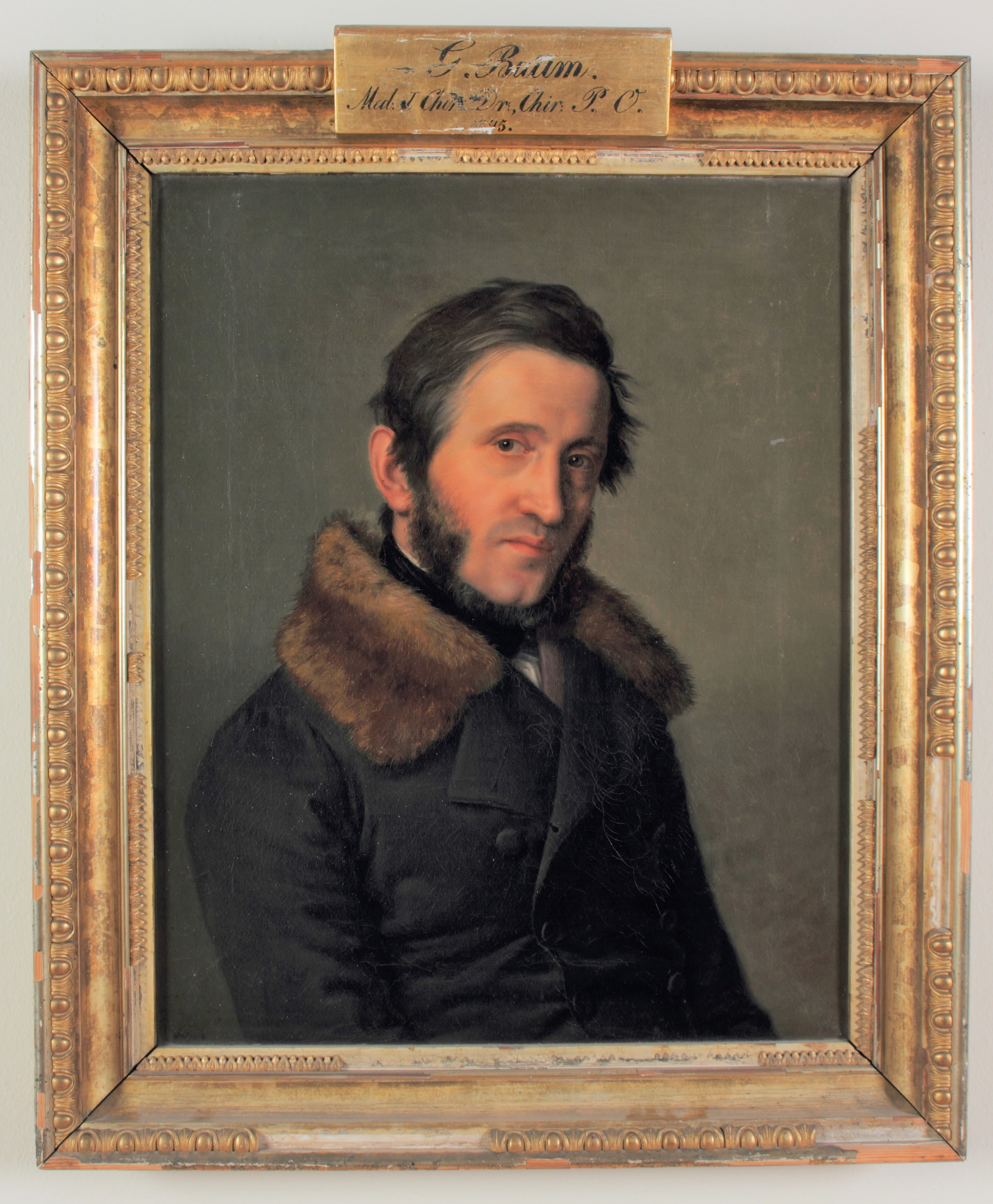
Wilhelm Baum (1799-1883)

Wilhelm Baum (10 September 1799 – 6 September 1883) was a German surgeon born in Elbing.

He studied medicine in Königsberg, Göttingen and Berlin, receiving his doctorate in 1822. At the University of Göttingen, he was influenced by Konrad Martin Langenbeck (1776–1855), Karl Gustav Himly (1772–1837) and Friedrich Benjamin Osiander (1759–1822). After graduation, he spent a year as a surgical assistant to Karl Ferdinand von Graefe (1787–1850) in Berlin, followed by several years of study in Austria, Italy, France and the British Isles (London, Edinburgh, Dublin). In Paris he attended lectures and clinics by Guillaume Dupuytren (1777–1835), Dominique Jean Larrey (1766–1842) and Jean Cruveilhier (1791–1874). During his years of travel, he pursued artistic interests in addition to furthering his studies in medicine.

In 1827 he returned to Berlin as a general practitioner, occasionally assisting his close friend Johann Friedrich Dieffenbach (1792–1847) with surgical operations. Afterwards he relocated to Danzig as chief surgeon at the municipal hospital. In Danzig he greatly distinguished himself during the cholera epidemic of 1831. In 1841 he undertook a research trip to Paris, where he studied lithotripsy with Jean Civiale (1792–1867) and Jean-Jacques-Joseph Leroy d'Etiolles (1798–1860), afterwards becoming a professor of surgery at the University of Greifswald (1842). Later in his career he was appointed professor of surgery at the University of Göttingen. Baum was an important influence to the career of Theodor Billroth (1829–1894).

Although considered a good teacher, he was not known for his writings. He was one of the first surgeons in Germany to perform tracheotomies for treatment of croup (1848 at Greifswald, five cases). He is also credited for providing an early mention of human pulmonary aspergillosis.

== Publications ==
- De urethræ virilis fissuris congenitis speciatim vero de epispadia, 1822 (dissertation)

Books about Wilhelm Baum

- Zum Andenken an Wilhelm Baum. Ein Nekrolog by Edmund Rose (1836–1914).
- "Wilhelm Baum 1799-1883" by Georg B Gruber.
