= Frère Jacques =

French children's song

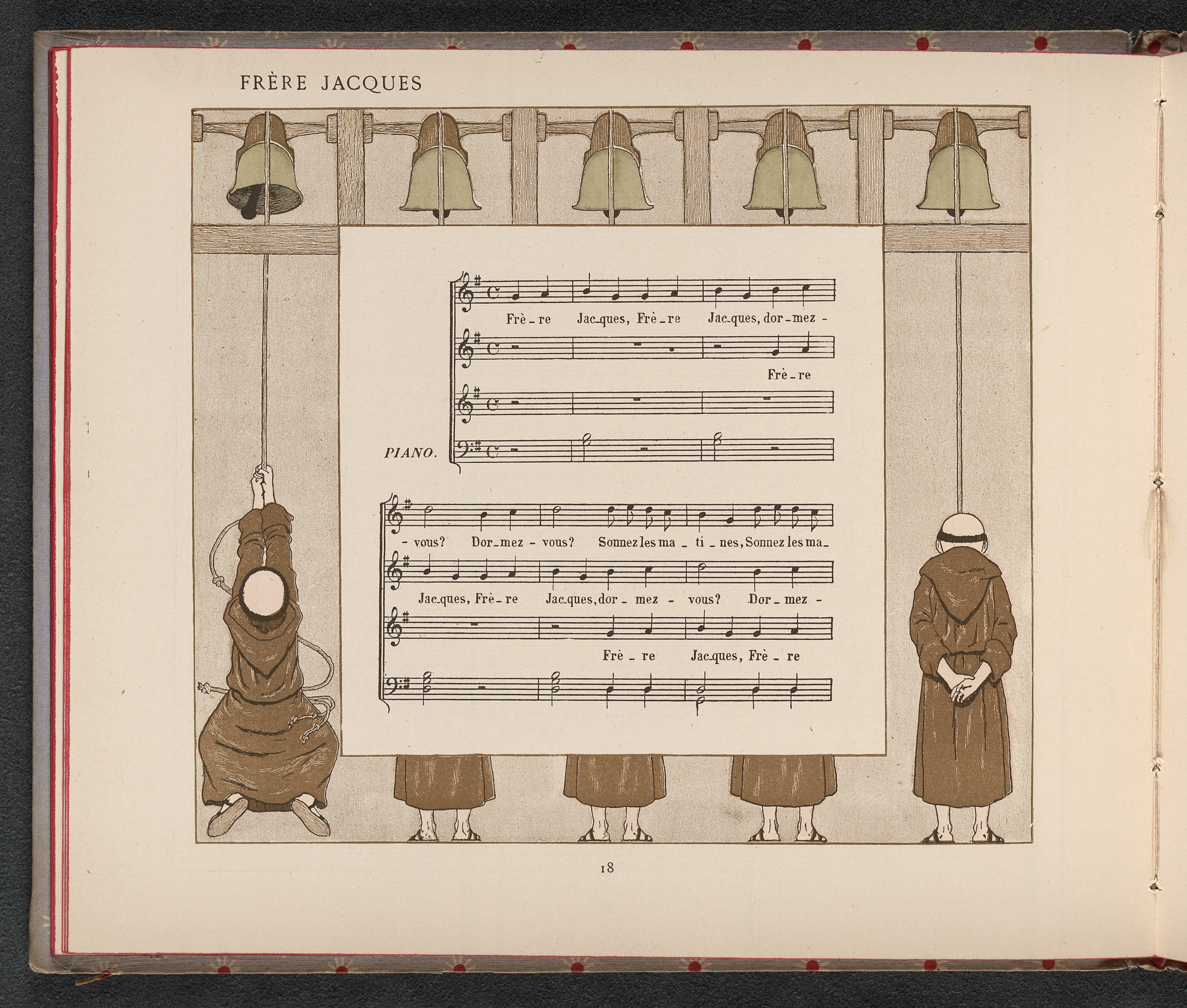
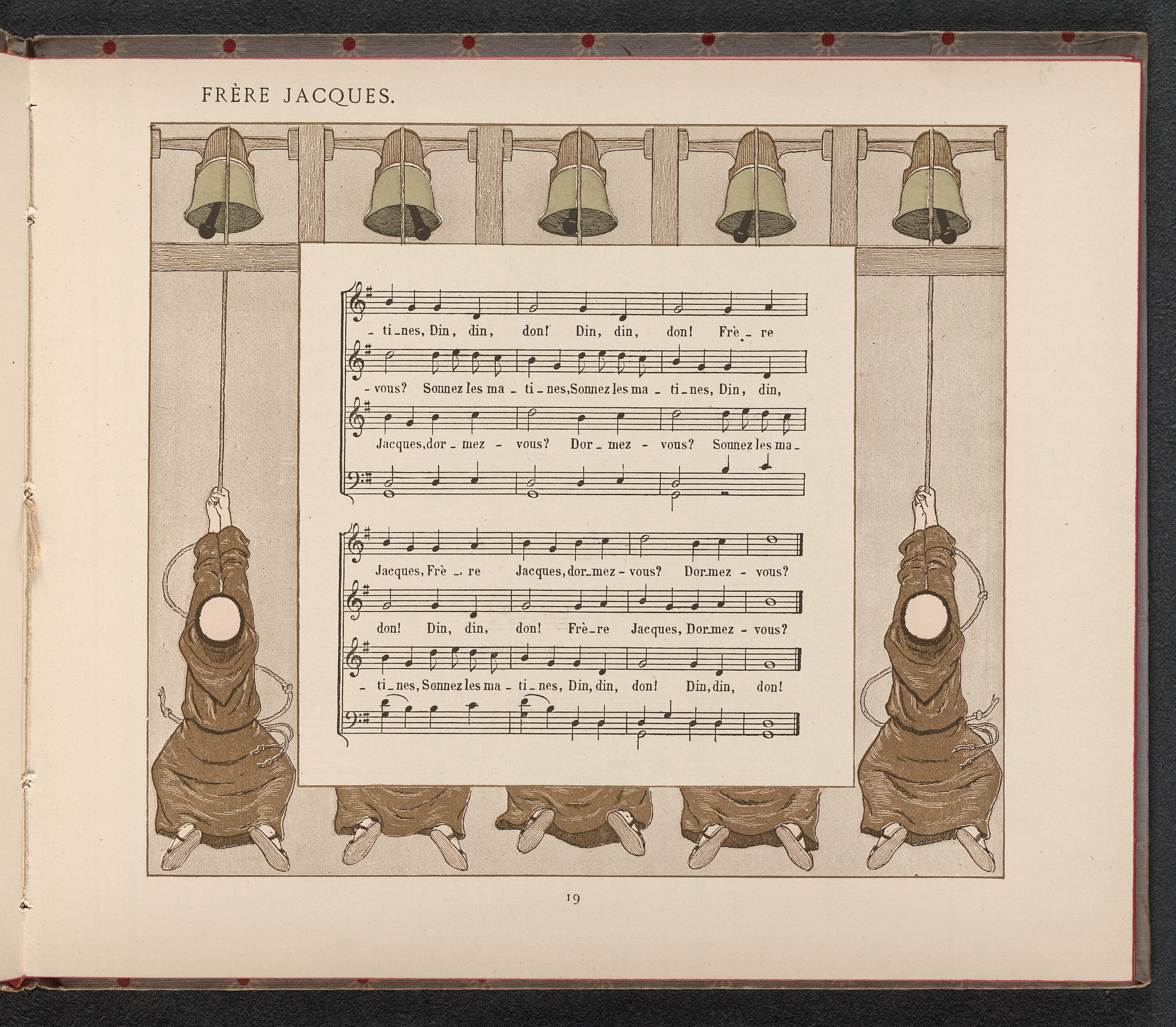

Nursery rhyme
- Language: French
- English title: "Brother John"
- Songwriter: Traditional

"Frère Jacques" (/ˌfrɛərə ˈʒɑːkə/ FRAIR-ə ZHAH-kə, French: [fʁɛʁ(ə) ʒak(ə)]), also known in English as "Brother John", is a nursery rhyme of French origin. The rhyme is traditionally sung in a round.

The song is about a friar who has overslept and is urged to wake up and sound the bell for the matins, the midnight or very early morning prayers for which a friar would be expected to be awake.

== Lyrics ==
Frère Jacques, Frère Jacques,
Dormez-vous ? Dormez-vous ?
Sonnez les matines ! Sonnez les matines !
Din, din, don. Din, din, don.

English translation
Brother Jacques, Brother Jacques,
Are you sleeping? Are you sleeping?
Ring/Sound [the bells for] matins! Ring [the bells for] matins!
Ding, ding, dong. Ding, ding, dong.

Traditional English lyrics
Are you sleeping? Are you sleeping?
Brother John, Brother John,
Morning bells are ringing! Morning bells are ringing!
Ding, dang, dong. Ding, dang, dong.

melody only

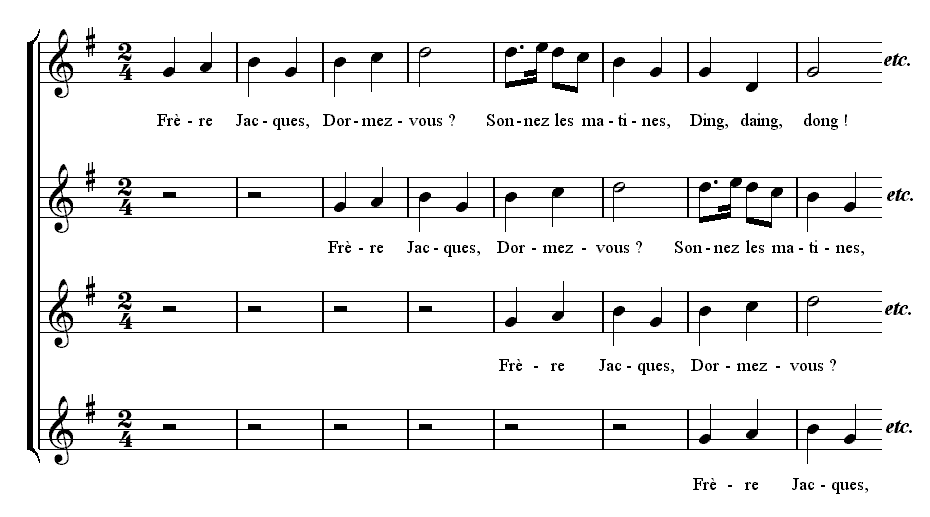
Sheet music as a round, without repetition of each half line

"Frère Jacques" as a round, in C

All four parts simultaneous: authentic cadence

The song concerns a friar's duty to ring the morning bells (matines). Frère Jacques has apparently overslept; it is time to ring the morning bells, and someone wakes him up with this song. The traditional English translation preserves the scansion, but alters the meaning such that Brother John is being awakened by the bells.

In English, the word friar is derived from the Old French word frere (Modern French frère; "brother" in English), as French was still widely used in official circles in England during the 13th century when the four great orders of Friars started. The French word frère in turn comes from the Latin word frater (which also means "brother").

=== Theories of origin ===
A possible connection between "Frère Jacques" and the 17th century lithotomist Frère Jacques Beaulieu (also known as Frère Jacques Baulot), as claimed by Irvine Loudon and many others, was explored by J. P. Ganem and C. C. Carson without finding any evidence for a connection.

Martine David and A. Marie Delrieu suggest that "Frère Jacques" might have been created to mock the Dominican friars, known in France as the Jacobin order, for their sloth and comfortable lifestyles.

In a review of a book about Kozma Prutkov, Richard Gregg, professor of Russian at Vassar College, notes that the satirical collective pseudonym Prutkov claimed "Frère Jacques" was derived from a Russian seminary song about a "Father Theofil".

== Published record ==
=== First publication ===
AllMusic states that the earliest version of the melody is on a French manuscript circa 1780 (manuscript 300 in the manuscript collection of the Bibliothèque Nationale in Paris). The manuscript is titled "Recueil de Timbres de Vaudevilles", and the Bibliothèque Nationale estimates that it was written between 1775 and 1785. The "Frère Jacques" melody is labelled "Frère Blaise" in this manuscript.

Sheet music collector James Fuld (1916–2008) states that the tune was first published in 1811, and that the words and music were published together in Paris in 1869. An earlier publication in 1825 included the words together with a description of the melody in solfège, but not in musical notation. The words and music appear together in Récréations de l'enfance: Recueil de rondes avec jeux et de petites chansons pour faire jouer, danser et chanter les enfants avec un accompagnement de piano très-facile by Charles Lebouc, which was first published in 1860 by Rouart, Lerolle & Cie. in Paris. This book was very popular and was republished several times, so many editions exist.

French musicologist Sylvie Bouissou has found some evidence that composer Jean-Philippe Rameau had written the music. A manuscript at the French National Library contains "Frère Jacques" among 86 canons, with Rameau listed as author.

In 1926, the tune was used in a patriotic anthem written by officers of the Chinese Whampoa Military Academy, "Revolution of the Citizens" (國民革命歌).

=== Comparison with Fra Jacopino ===
"Frère Jacques" bears resemblance to the piece Toccate d'intavolatura, No. 14, Capriccio Fra Jacopino sopra L'Aria Di Ruggiero composed by Girolamo Frescobaldi, which was first published around 1615—"Fra Jacopino" is one potential Italian translation for "Frère Jacques". Edward Kilenyi pointed out that "Fra Jacopino" shares the same "Frère Jacques"-like melody as "Chanson de Lambert", a French song dating from 1650, and a Hungarian folk tune.

The "Frère Jacques" tune is one of the most basic repeating canons along with the melody of "Three Blind Mice". It is also simple enough to have spread easily from place to place. For example, Barbara Mittler in a conference abstract points out that the melody of "Frère Jacques" is so thoroughly assimilated into Chinese culture that it might be widely regarded as a Chinese folksong in China called "Two Tigers".

== Influence ==
=== Science ===
- In the fields of chemistry and cheminformatics, the circuit rank of a molecular graph (the number of rings in the smallest set of smallest rings) is sometimes referred to as the Frèrejacque number.

=== Popular culture ===
- A version of the tune appears in the third movement of the Symphony No. 1 by Gustav Mahler. Mahler presents the melody in a minor key instead of a major key, thus giving the piece the character of a funeral march or dirge; however, the mode change to minor might not have been an invention by Mahler, as is often believed, but rather the way this round was sung in the 19th century and early 20th century in Austria. Francesca Draughon and Raymond Knapp argue that Mahler had changed the key to make "Frère Jacques" sound more "Jewish." Draughon and Knapp claim that the tune was originally sung to mock non-Catholics, such as Protestants or Jews. Mahler himself called the tune by its German name, "Bruder Martin", and made some allusions to the piece being related to a parody in the programs he wrote for the performances. Interpretations similar to this are quite prevalent in academia and in musical circles.
- Leonard Bernstein made use of the song to illustrate counterpoint in his television program What Makes Music Symphonic? (one of a series of 53 programs, the Young People's Concerts with the New York Philharmonic, combining music and lectures that were televised between 1959 and 1972).
- The Beatles' 1966 song ”Paperback Writer" features the title "Frère Jacques" sung by John Lennon and George Harrison under the main melody of the last verse.
- The French performer known as Le Pétomane entertained live audiences in the late 19th and early 20th centuries with his own unique rendition, according to the BBC.
- Henri Bernstein, a French playwright, wrote a comedic play entitled Frère Jacques (translated as Brother Jacques) with Pierre Veber in 1904.
- Frère Jacques is a type of semi-soft cow's milk cheese with a mild hazelnut taste, produced by Benedictine monks from the Saint-Benoit-du-lac Abbey in Quebec, Canada.
- Four French singers, brothers André and Georges Bellec, François Soubeyran and Paul Tourenne formed a comedic singing group in 1944 known as Les Frères Jacques, even though none of them were named "Jacques". The group name was a bit of a play on words since a common French expression, "faire le jacques", means to act like a clown. They had successful careers over the next few decades.
- The demonstrators in Tiananmen Square chanted political slogans to the tune of "Frère Jacques".
- There is a strong oral tradition among children in China, Vietnam and other places in Asia of passing on songs with their own lyrics, sung to the tune of "Frère Jacques".
- Frère Jacques was the name of a chain of franchised French restaurants in the UK and the name of a French restaurant in the Murray Hill section of New York City. Les Frères Jacques is the name of a French restaurant in Dublin.
- Ron Haselden, a British artist living in the French town of Brizard, in Brittany, has produced an interactive multimedia piece featuring "Frère Jacques" in collaboration with Peter Cusack.
- The Chinese song “Dadao lie qiang” (“Cut down the great powers”), also known as “Revolution of the Citizens” (國民革命歌), is a patriotic anthem written by officers of the Whampoa Military Academy during the 1920s. It was associated with the First United Front between the Kuomintang and the Chinese Communist Party and promoted cooperation against warlords and foreign imperialist powers. The song is sung to the tune of "Frère Jacques."
- K-pop group Nmixx interpolates the rhyme into their 2023 song "Young, Dumb, Stupid".
- The Beach Boys' song "Surf's Up" references the English version of "Frère Jacques', both lyrically and melodically, in the song's line, "Are you sleeping, brother John?"
