= Wilhelm Baum =

Wilhelm Baum may refer to:

- Wilhelm Baum (historian) (born 1948), Austrian historian
- Wilhelm Baum (surgeon) (1799–1883), German surgeon
