= Laurent Colot =

French physician

Laurent Colot (1520–1590) was a French physician.

Colot specialized in the treatment of kidney stones, using secret techniques he inherited from his father Germain. Laurent was named lithotomist of the Hôtel-Dieu in Paris and, in 1556, was named Operator of Stones for Henri II, although Ambroise Paré was the king's general surgeon.

Colot was the first of several generations of Paris lithotomists.
