= Joanna Muszkowska-Penson =

Polish physician and academic lecturer

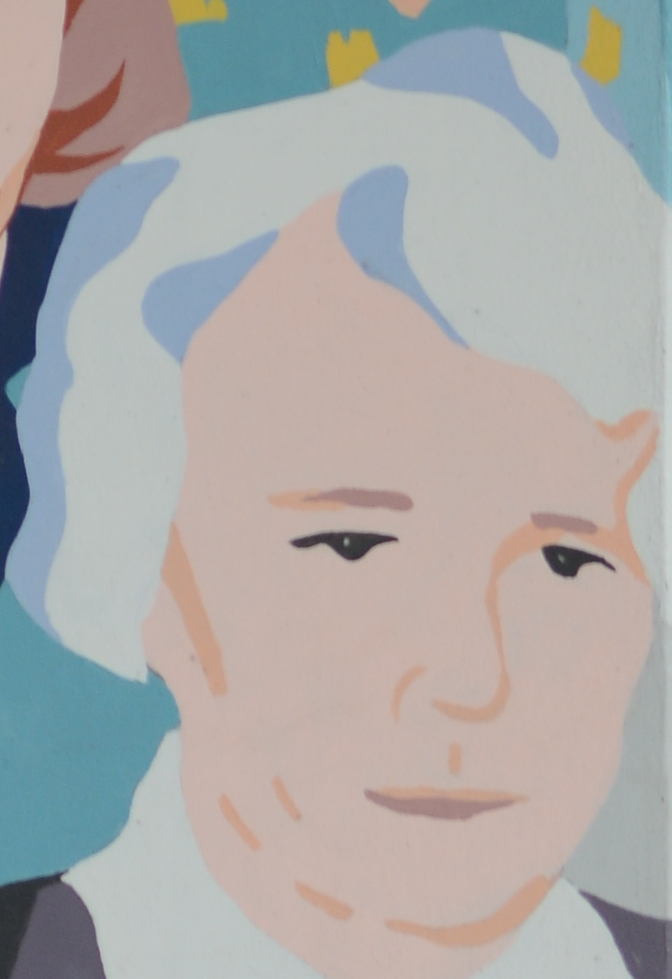
- Image of Joanna Muszkowska-Penson on the mural ‘Women of Freedom’ in Gdańsk
- Born: 25 October 1921; Warsaw, Second Polish Republic
- Died: 30 June 2023 (aged 101); Sopot, Poland
- Burial place: Srebrzysko Cemetery
- Occupation: Professor of medical sciences

Academic background
- Education: Medical University of Łódź

Academic work
- Discipline: internal medicine, nephrology
- Institutions: Medical University of Gdańsk

Joanna Helena Muszkowska-Penson (1921– 2023) was a Polish doctor and academic teacher, professor of medical sciences, opposition activist during the Polish People's Republic and close associate of anti-communist leader and future Polish president Lech Wałęsa.

== Biography ==
Joanna Helena Muszkowska-Penson was born in 1921 in Warsaw, she was the daughter of bibliologist Jan and Janina Muszkowska. In 1939, she graduated from Queen Jadwiga Secondary School No. 10 in Warsaw and in 1940 she became a soldier Union of Armed Struggle in Warsaw. In 1941 she was apprehended and placed in Pawiak Prison, in September of that year, she was imprisoned in the German concentration camp Ravensbrück, from which she was freed in April 1945.

In 1950, she graduated from Medical University of Łódż. In 1961, she obtained her doctorate, and in 1971, she obtained her postdoctoral degree. In 1976, she received a professorship in medical sciences. She specialised in nephrology and internal medicine. From 1950 to 1980 employed at the Kidney Disease Clinic of the Medical University of Gdańsk, then until 1991 at the provincial hospital, where she held the position of head of the internal medicine department.

=== Anti-communist activism ===
During the strikes in August 1980 supported the striking shipyard workers, then joined Solidarity. After martial law was imposed, she hid Piotr Dyk, among others, in her flat. In the 1980s, she was also Lech Wałęsa's personal doctor and interpreter. On the 14 April 1984 she was detained and then arrested for distributing underground publications. The imprisonment of this well-known and respected doctor was met with protests – a petition for her release was signed by several thousand people. Ultimately, Joanna Muszkowska-Penson was released after a few days. She continued her opposition activities, including in May and August 1988, when she worked as a doctor during the strikes at the Gdańsk Shipyard and in the port of Gdańsk.

== Personal life ==
In 1991 she retired, where she moved to Glasgow to live with her daughter. In 2006 she returned to Poland, took up a job in Lech Wałęsa's office.

From 1954, she was married to Jakub Penson, who was the rector of the Medical Academy in Gdańsk in the 1960s.

On the 30th June 2023 Joanna Helena Muszkowska-Penson died in Sopot and she was buried on the 7 July 2023 at the Srebrzysko cemetery in Gdańsk.

== Medals and Awards ==
- Commanders cross of the Order of Polonia Restituta (2006)
- Gold Cross of Merit (1975)
- Medal of Prince Mściwoj II (2014)
- Medal for Distinguished Service to the Medical Academy in Gdańsk (1980)
- Medal commemorating the 30th anniversary of the Medical Academy in Gdańsk(1975)
- Medal commemorating the 50th anniversary of the Medical Academy in Gdańsk (1995)
- Honorary badge ‘For Merit in the Protection of Human Rights’ (2016)
- Honorary citizen of Gdańsk (2018)

== Legacy ==
Joanna Helena Muszkowska-Penson's image appears on the 2019 ‘Women of Freedom’ mural at the PKM Strzyża station in Gdańsk.

In 2021, a commemorative plaque dedicated to Joanna Muszkowska-Penson was unveiled at her former home at 29 Tuwima Street in Gdańsk.
