= Ammonius Lithotomos =

Ammonius Lithotomos (/əˈmoʊniəs/; Greek: Ἀμμώνιος; fl. 3rd century BC), of Alexandria, was a Greek lithotomist.

== Work ==
Reported by Celsus, Ammonius invented the tools to break up "bladder stones".

"A hook or crotchet is fixed upon the stone in such a way as easily to hold it firm, even when shaken, so that it may not revolve backward; then an iron instrument is used, of moderate thickness, thin at the front end but blunt, which, when applied to the stone and struck at the other end, cleaves it. Great care must be taken that the instrument do not come into contact with the bladder itself, and that nothing fall upon it by the breaking of the stone." This is the method Ammonius uses to break up stones in the bladder as reported by Celsus

Lithoclastic cystotomy is attributed to Ammonius Lithotomos (stone-cutter), from which arose the term lithotomy, now having the arbitrary signification of cutting for the stone. Celsus gave the first description of lithotomy as performed before and during his time, and the operation has ever since borne his name—the Celsian method.

From Paulus Aegineta: "To stop bleeding, Oribasius directs, in the first place, cooling and astringent applications to be used, and if these do not succeed, caustics, such as misy, chalcitis, copperas, or the actual cautery. Upon the whole, his account of hemorrhage is nearly the same as our author's, only he says nothing of the ligature. Aetius treats of this subject in the same terms as Galen, recommending the ligature under the circumstances mentioned by him. Some of his styptics are powerful escharotics and astringents, such as copperas, chalcitis, alum, galls, quicklime, rosin, and frankincense. He informs us that "Ammonius, the famous Alexandrian lithomist, used a composition of arsenic, sandarach, chalcitis, and quicklime.""
