= Electrohydraulic lithotripsy =

Form of lithotripsy

Electrohydraulic lithotripsy (EHL) is a medical procedure which uses targeted shockwaves to break up kidney stones and gallstones. This form of extracorporeal lithotripsy is unique in that the shockwaves are produced by a vaporization bubble expanding and collapsing repeatedly, creating a pressure wave. The procedure is non-invasive and has a 90% success rate, which makes it a first-line treatment for smaller kidney stones.

EHL was the first modern extracorporeal lithotripter invented in 1954 by an engineer from Kyiv, but because he was out of favor with Stalin's government, he was banished and the use of his invention was delayed for around 10 years.

This procedure is also used to treat gallstones in the bile or pancreatic ducts that are difficult to remove with other methods of lithotripsy. While being less expensive than laser lithotripsy, EHL does carry a greater risk of ureteral injury. When treating gallstones, EHL can be used in conjunction with a spyglass camera, a camera inserted through the throat and esophagus and down into the stomach and duodenum to visualize the bile or pancreatic duct.
