= Jerzy Sikorski =

Polish historian (born 1935)

Jerzy Sikorski (born July 25, 1935) is a Polish historian, Copernicologist, medievalist, museologist, author, publisher, journalist, and encyclopedist, who writes and publishes primarily in Polish. He is a resident of Olsztyn, Poland.

== Life ==
=== Early life ===
Jerzy Sikorski was born on July 25, 1935, in Vilnius (Polish: Wilno), to Anna Wołk-Lewanowicz (1914–1995) and Feliks Sikorski (1889–1980). Five years later (1940) Sikorski's sister Maria Danuta was born.

In October 1944, during World War II, Sikorski's mother Anna was arrested by the People's Commissariat for State Security along with 40 other people, when she was exposed as a courier between Vilnius' "Kedyw" and the general staff of the Polish Home Army. Early in January 1945 Sikorski's father Feliks was also arrested because he was a soldier of the 1st Polish Corps under the Polish general Józef Dowbor-Muśnicki in the Polish-Soviet War,, but he was released after three months. Upon his release, Feliks made efforts to obtain Anna's release from prison, locate and take care of Jerzy and Maria, and reunite his family. Anna was released from prison camp in June 1946, and the family moved to Olsztyn. They chose Olsztyn based on the fact that most of the Vilnius board of education where Feliks once worked had been evacuated to Olsztyn, and Feliks could resume his position there.

=== Education ===
Following World War II, Sikorski's mother was prevented from teaching due to political persecution. After Sikorski graduated from high school in 1953, he was repeatedly denied entry to university in spite of passing exams in Gdańsk, Warsaw, Toruń, and Poznań. Each time, he received the characteristic preprinted postcard with "not accepted due to lack of space". On the advice of a Polish studies specialist teacher (Polish philologist), Janina Kirkicka, Sikorski was able to enroll in a two-year teacher's college in Olsztyn, but after two weeks the director Bolesław Wytrążek instructed Sikorski to leave the college, due to the decision of the local Polish United Workers' Party (PZPR) in Olsztyn. Through Hieronim Skurpski, who was the director at the Museum of Warmia and Masuria located at Olsztyn Castle, Sikorski obtained employment (1954–1955) at the Nicolas Copernicus Museum in Frombork, which was under the patronage of the regional museum in Olsztyn. The work at Frombork's museum and the person of the great Polish Astronomer Nicolas Copernicus, who spent most of his life in Frombork and Warmia region, made a lasting impression on Sikorski. As a result, Copernicus and Copernicana research became the dominant subject in Sikorski's lifetime work and in his professional affiliations with various research centers. Ultimately, it led to Sikorski's discovery and publication of Copernicus' resting place at Frombork's cathedral in 1973, which was confirmed archaeologically in 2005.

In the fall of 1955 Sikorski enrolled at the Nicolaus Copernicus University in Toruń, where he chose to study under professor Karol Górski, who among other scholarly pursuits studied and researched the life and politics of Copernicus' maternal uncle, Bishop Lucas Watzenrode. Sikorski wrote his master's thesis on Watzenrode, and subsequently wrote his doctoral dissertation "Polish monarchy and Warmia at the end of the 15th century: Issues in systemic-law and politics".

Upon completing of his academic studies at the Nicolas Copernicus University in Toruń in 1960, Sikorski accepted a position at the Museum of Warmia at Lidzbark Warmiński Castle, where Copernicus spent at least seven years (1503–1509). Copernicus had strong ties to the city of Lidzbark, and had visited there at the invitation of his maternal uncle Bishop Lucas Watzenrode in 1495. Sikorski worked at the museum from 1961 to 1962.

Lidzbark Warmiński Castle was of substantial significance for Jerzy Sikorski's Copernicana studies in terms of the history of astronomy; as well as because the castle was a strongly fortified seat of the bishops of Warmia and the administration center of their lands from the second half of the 14th century. At that time, Lidzbark city had one of the largest populations in Warmia, similar to Braniewo. In Lidzbark, Sikorski researched historic documents pertaining to the history of Poland's Baltic seashore (Pomerania, Warmia, Mazury, Prussia), and its extant architectural relics, documents, and other materials relating to Nicolaus Copernicus. Following the death of bishop Watzenrode in Toruń on March 29, 1512, Copernicus only sporadically visited Lidzbark, either as an emissary of the Warmia Chapter, or as a personal medical doctor for the successive bishops: Fabian Luzjański (d. 1523), Mauritius Ferber (Polish: Maurycy Ferber 1471–1537), and Johannes Dantiscus (Polish: Jan Dantyszek; 1485–1548).

== Author ==
An organized index of published books and articles by Sikorski is listed at his web portal, covering four areas of research: 1. Copernicana; 2. Cities and castles of Prussia; 3. Historic tradition of the region; and, 4. The History of Science.

An additional indexed list of Sikorski's complete articles and papers is available online at the Database of Articles (in Polish), including two English language papers: "The Empirical Table of Olsztyn the Question of Nicolaus Copernicus' Scientific Workshop", and "The Practice of Bishops' Burials in Frombork Cathedral and the Question of the Grave of Nicolaus Copernicus' Uncle Łukasz Watzenrode".

In 1973, in time for the 500th anniversary of Nicolas Copernicus' birth, Sikorski authored a popular monograph on the astronomer's life, work, and times. Three updated editions were published, in 1985, 1995, and 2011.

== History of Science consultant ==
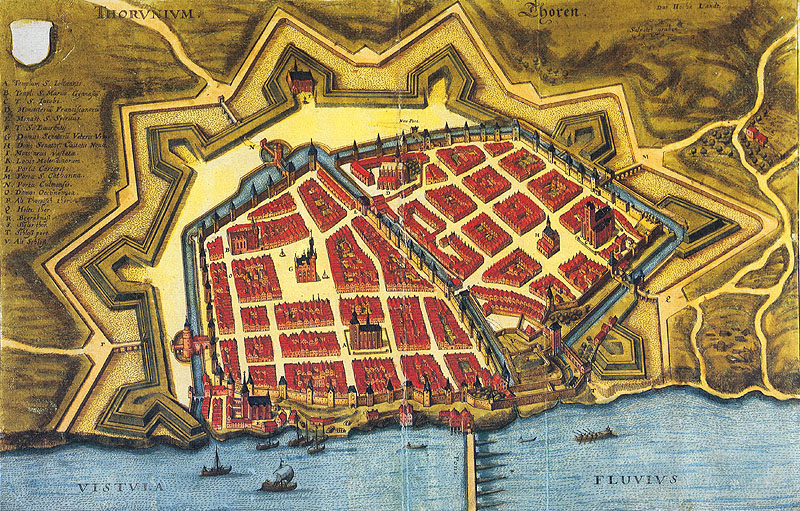
Toruń city plan from 1641

Dr Jerzy Sikorski is credited for history of science consultation in the opening titles to the Polish motion picture Kopernik, released in Toruń, Poland, on February 14, 1973. The film was released on the occasion of the world and United Nations celebrations of the 500th anniversary of Copernicus' birth that were organized by the International Union of History and Philosophy of Science.

== Journalist ==
Between 1966 and 2007 Jerzy Sikorski published a number of articles in Mazury-Warmian Communications (Komunikaty Mazursko-Warmińskie), on the history of Poland's ancestral Baltic seashore Pomerania, and the Polish regions of Warmia and Masuria. He also published articles on the life and activities of the Polish astronomer Nicolaus Copernicus.

Sikorski was a member of the editorial staff at Komunikaty Mazursko-Warmińskie, and also a member of staff at Frombork's Commentaries (Komentarze Fromborskie), and also the substitute editor-in-chief of Olsztyn Yearly (Rocznik Olsztyński),

== Encyclopedist ==
Jerzy Sikorski published a number of short biographies of Warmian Chapter canons and members in the Polish Biographical Dictionary, which is printed by the Polish Academy of Sciences. These included biographies of Preuck Jan (1575–1631), Preuck Jerzy (d. 1556), Reich Feliks (c. 1475–1539), Sculteti Aleksander (1485–1564), Sculteti Bernard (d. 1518), and Sculteti Jan (d. 1526).

== Copernicologist ==
=== Copernicus' Polish nationality and descent ===
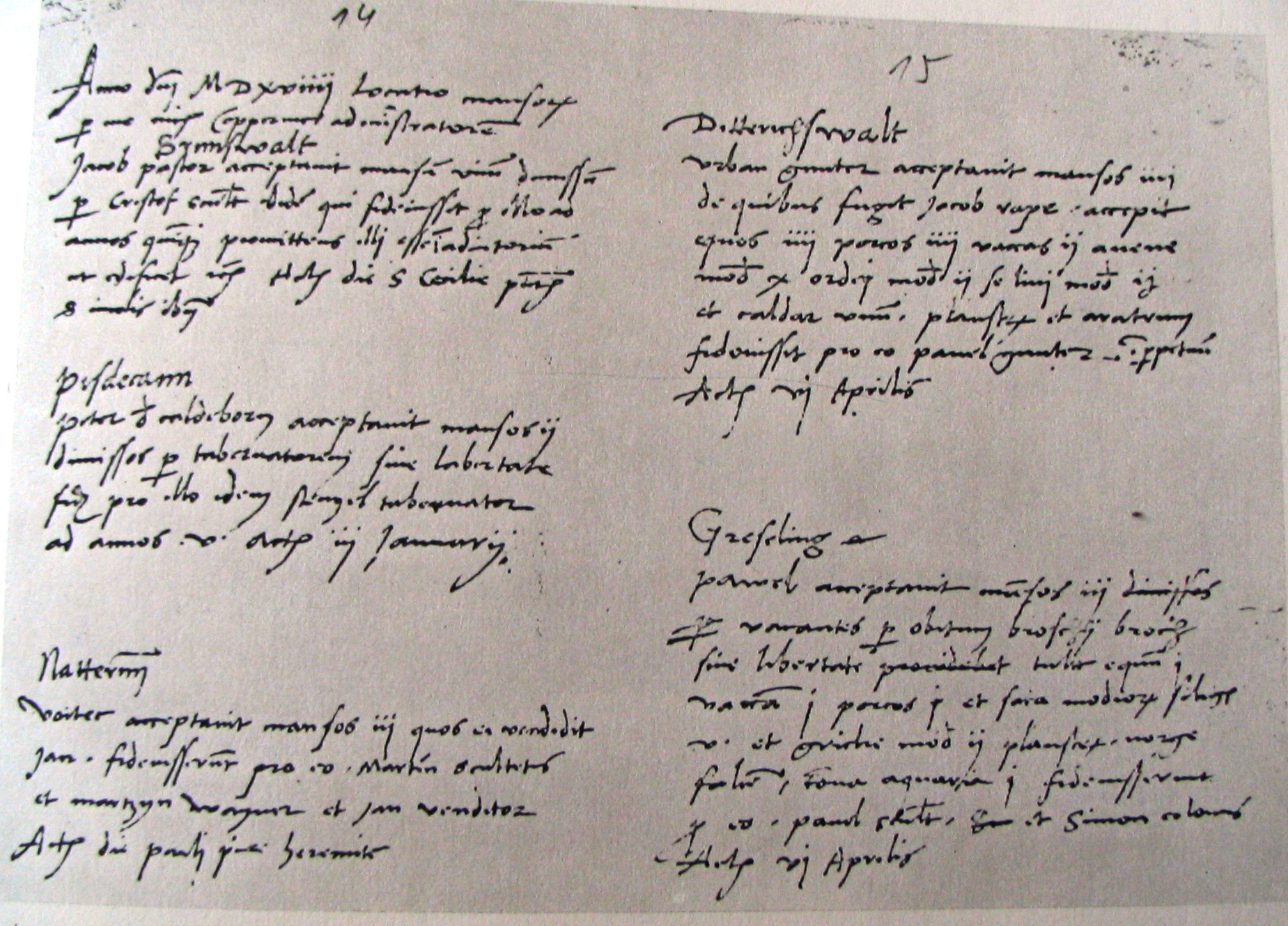
Nicolaus [Nicolas] Copernicus' extant manuscript, 15 pages – Locationes mansorum desertorum (Allocation of abandoned fiefs)

Reviewing the document Locationes mansorum desertorum (Allocation of abandoned fiefs), which was written by Copernicus in the region of Olsztyn Castle, Olsztyn, Poland, Jerzy Sikorski discovered that, out of the 136 names of allocation of fiefs, 60 were Polish names (peasants had only first names) written in phonetically correct Polish. Sikorski also cites an extant document where Copernicus' witness was Copernicus' Polish servant: Wojciech Cebulski. These documents indicate that Copernicus spoke and wrote Polish.

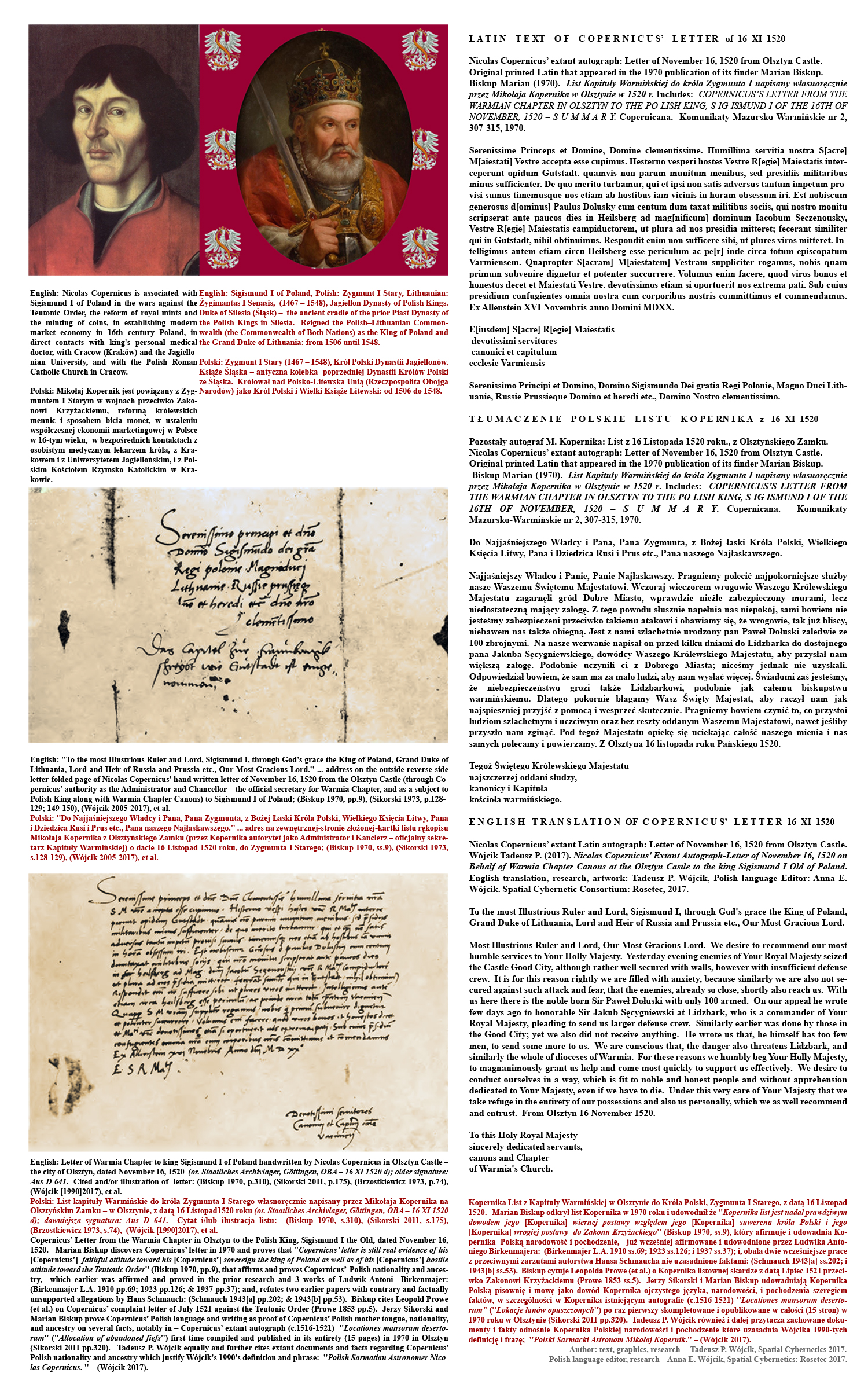
Letter of Warmia Chapter to King Sigismund I of Poland, handwritten by Nicolas Copernicus in Olsztyn Castle, November 16, 1520 (or. Staatliches Archivlager, Göttingen, OBA – 16 XI 1520 d); older signature: Aus D 641.

In a letter to king Sigismund I of Poland handwritten by Nicolas Copernicus in Olsztyn Castle, the administrator, chancellor, and commander in chief of the defense of Olsztyn Castle Copernicus and Warmia Canons together affirm their Polish nationality as subjects to King Sigismund I of Poland against the enemy, the German Teutonic Order. The writers say that they are willing to die defending Olsztyn Castle, Warmia, and Poland from the Teutonic Knights. Nicolas Copernicus is directly associated with Sigismund I of Poland in the wars against the Teutonic Order, the reform of royal mints and the minting of coins, in establishing modern market economy in 16th century Poland, in direct contacts with king's personal medical doctor, with Cracow (Kraków) and the Jagiellonian University, and with the Polish Roman Catholic Church in Cracow.

Sikorski wrote "the intellectual adventure of my life were my discoveries of Copernicus' Polish ancestry and nationality".

=== Copernicus' resting place ===
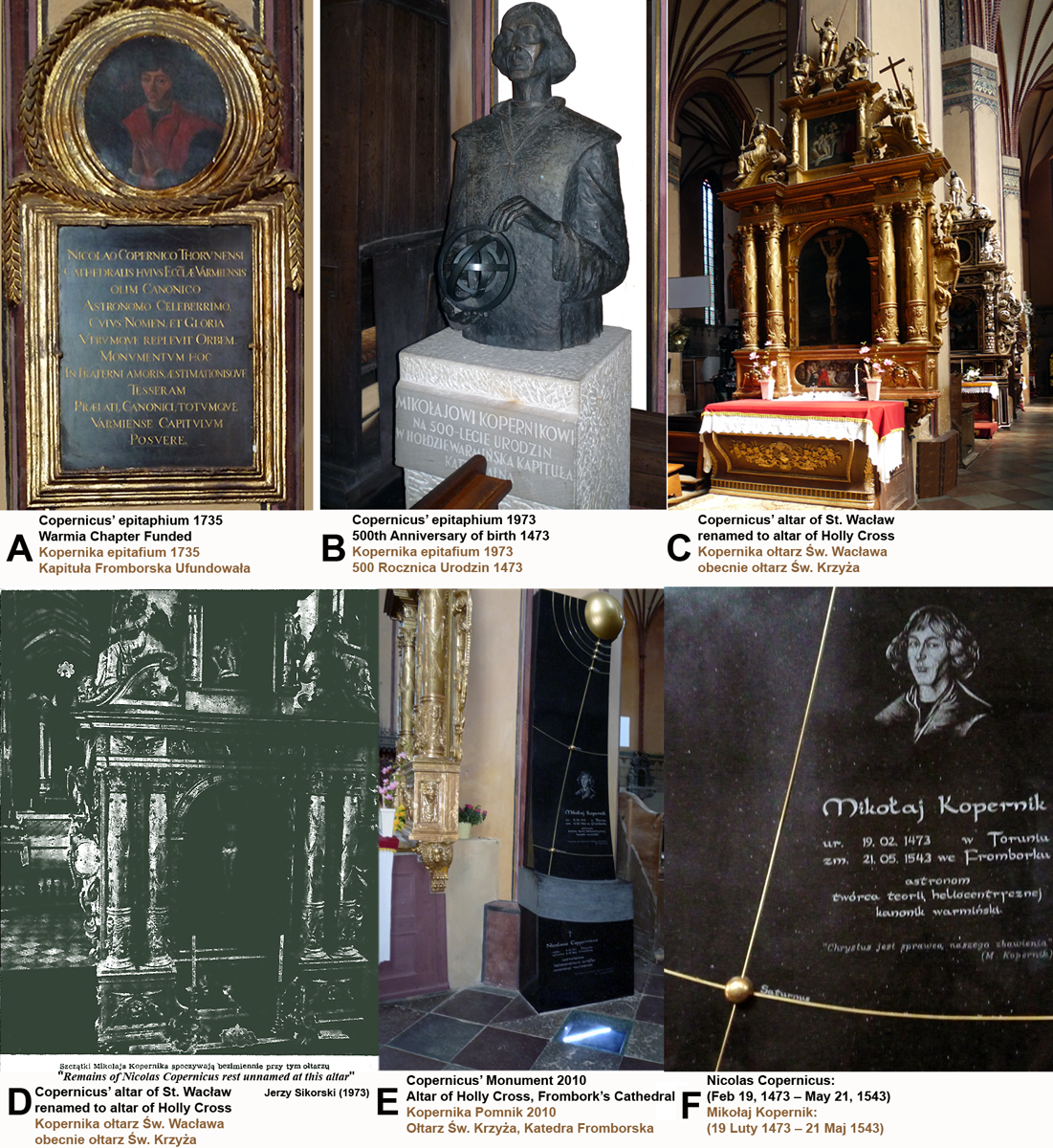
Photographs of Copernicus' 1735 and 1973 epitaphia, the altar of St. Wacław (altar of the Holy Cross), where his grave is located, and the 2010 monument to Copernicus

Copernicus was reportedly buried in Frombork Cathedral, but archaeologists searched there in vain for centuries for his remains. Efforts to locate the remains in 1581, 1626, 1802, 1909, 1939 and 2004 came to nought. In 1973 Dr Jerzy Sikorski published the location of Copernicus' resting place in his book, including the photo of the Altar of Saint Wacław, today Altar of Saint Cross, with a subscription (English translation of Polish) "The remains of Mikołaj Kopernik rest unnamed next to this altar".

Sikorski's analysis of recovered chapter documents guided the Polish archaeological searches of Frombork in 2004–2005. The Institute of Anthropology and Archaeology at the Pultusk Academy of Humanities of Aleksander Gieysztor, with Polish archaeologists under the direction of Dr. Jerzy Gąssowski, commenced the search for Copernicus' grave from 16 to 31 of August, 2004, in an area of 10 square meters, and this search was financially supported by the Archaeologic Foundation of Prof Konrad Jażdżewski in Lódz, Poland. In the second archaeological search conducted in August 2005, Copernicus' skull and remains were discovered in a grave marked by archaeologists as 13/5. Forensic expert Capt. Dariusz Zajdel of the Polish Police Central Forensic Laboratory used the skull to reconstruct a face that closely resembled the features—including a broken nose and a scar above the left eye—on a Copernicus self-portrait. The expert also determined that the skull belonged to a man who had died around age 70—Copernicus's age at the time of his death.

The remains were genetically tested in Poland and Sweden and found to match hair samples taken from a book owned by Copernicus which was kept at the library of the University of Uppsala in Sweden.

=== Location of Copernicus' observatories ===
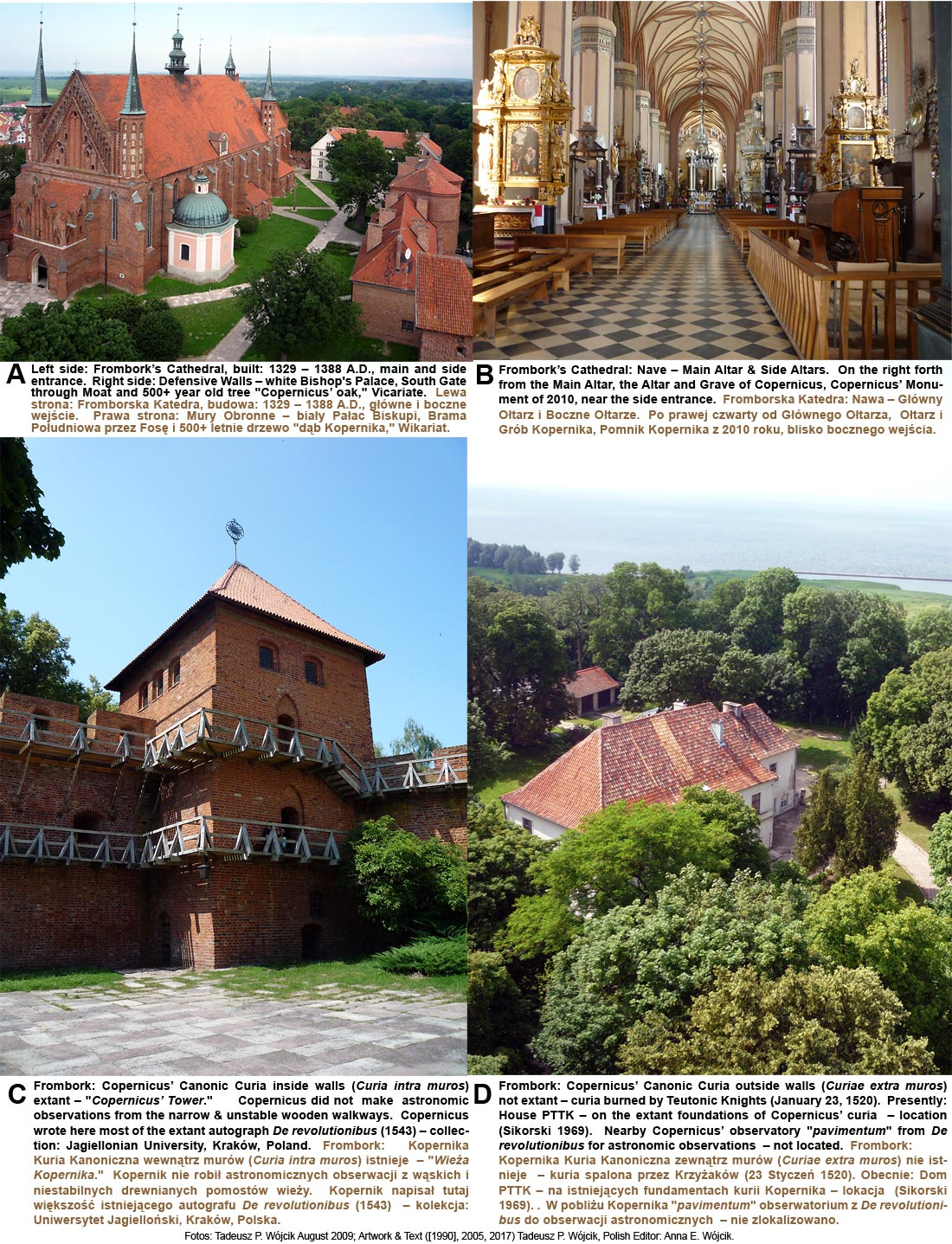
Photographs of Frombork Cathedral and defensive walls, Copernicus' extant Canonic Curia inside the walls (Curiae intra muros), and the location of Copernicus' no-longer-extant Canonic Curia outside walls (Curiae extra muros).

Sikorski discovered the location of Copernicus' Canonic Curia outside the walls of Frombork (the Curiae extra muros). The building is not extant, having been burned by Teutonic Knights on February 1, 1520, but the foundation remains.

Sikorski searched the area nearby with instruments such as ground-penetrating radar in an effort to find Copernicus' observatory "pavimentum", which was believed to have been nearby, but did not find it. Sikorski was aided in the search by the notebook of Elias Olsen, who was sent by Tycho Brahe to Frombork in 1584 to use the still-extant pavimentum to obtain astronomic observations for comparison with those of Copernicus. As of 2011 the pavimentum has still not been located. Its foundations may have been destroyed during extensive ground works near Copernicus' external curia.

Sikorski since 1973 researched and wrote on Copernicus' observatory in Olsztyn, which contains a still-extant plaster astronomical table that was used by Copernicus from 1516 to 1521.

== Recognition ==
Sikorski has been awarded Polish presidential medals for his professional work as a historian and Copernicologist: the Gold Cross of Merit (1975) and Knight's Cross of the Order of Polonia Restituta (1986).

On the fifteenth anniversary of the Warmia-Mazury Business Club, the President of Poland Lech Kaczyński gave presidential orders and awards to deserving club members. On March 28, 2008, the title "Personality of the Year 2008 in Warmia and Mazury" was awarded to Jerzy Sikorski for his research into the life and science of Nicolas Copernicus, and for his 1973 discovery of Copernicus's resting place.

== Works ==
1. Sikorski Jerzy (1966). Mikołaj Kopernik na Warmii-Chronologia Życia I Działalności, (Nicolaus Copernicus in Warmia: Chronology of His Life and Activities by Jerzy Sikorski), published by: Stacja Naukowa Polskiego Towarzystwa Historycznego (Instytut Mazurski) w Olsztynie, Olsztyn 1968; originally published in, quarterly: "Komunikaty Mazursko-Warmińskie" 1966 nr 2-4, 1967 nr 1-2.
2. Sikorski Jerzy (1973). Prywatne Życie Mikołaja Kopernika, wyd. 1, Olsztyn 1973.
3. Sikorski Jerzy (1978). Monarchia polska i Warmia u schyłku XV wieku. Zagadnienia prawno-ustrojowe i polityczne, Olsztyn, 1978
4. Sikorski Jerzy (1985). Prywatne Życie Mikołaja Kopernika, wyd. 2 uzupełnione, Olsztyn 1985.
5. Sikorski Jerzy (1988). Spotkanie się i bitwa straszna Polaków z Krzyżakami 15 lipca 1410 roku (wybór i przekł. [z łac.] Jerzy Sikorski; oprac. graf. Mieczysław Romańczuk), Olsztyn, 1988.
6. Sikorski Jerzy (1993). Z zagadnień organizacji i warsztatu naukowego Mikołaja Kopernika, quarterly, Komunikaty Mazursko-Warmińskie, 1993, nr 2 (200), s.131-166, Olsztyn 1993. (Pertains to: "On the issues of organization and the scientific workshop of Nicolas Copernicus.")
7. Sikorski Jerzy (1995). Prywatne Życie Mikołaja Kopernika, wyd. 3 uzupełnione, Prószyński i S-ka Warszawa 1995.
8. Sikorski Jerzy (2003). Przywilej lokacyjny miasta Olsztyn (przekł. z jęz. łac. Anna Mrówczyńska, Jerzy Sikorski; grafika Maria Rubik-Grabska; red. Barbara Wojczulanis), Olsztyn, 2003.
9. Sikorski Jerzy (2005). Grób Mikołaja Kopernika w katedrze biskupów warmińskich we Fromborku na tle Polityki grzebalnej kapituły w XV-XVI wieku. Castri Dominae Nostrae Litterae Annales, red. J. Gąssowski, vol. II. Pułtusk 2005, s. 81 – 173.
10. Sikorski Jerzy (2006). The tomb of Nicolaus Copernicus In the Warmia bishops' cathedral in Frombork against the background of the chapters burial practice in the 15th – 18th centuries. /in:/. The search for Nicolaus Copernicus Tomb, ed. J. Gąssowski, Pułtusk., pp. 73 –165.
11. Sikorski Jerzy (2010). Bitwa straszna Polaków z Krzyżakami : Jan Długosz (wybór i przekł. [z łac.] Jerzy Sikorski; oprac. graf. Marcin Łabaj; zdj. Witold Mierzejewski), Olsztyn, 2010.
12. Sikorski Jerzy (2011). Prywatne Życie Mikołaja Kopernika. wyd. 3 uzupełnione, Olsztyn, Pracownia Wydawnicza ElSet, Olsztyn 2011. ISBN 978-83-61602-77-4 (Pertains to: "The Private Life of Nicolas Copernicus").
13. Sikorski Jerzy, Jasiński Janusz (2014). Mikołaj Kopernik, Immanuel Kant: Dwie najwybitniejsze postacie nauki na ziemiach niegdyś pruskich. Pracownia Wydawnicza "ElSet", Olsztyn 2014. Jerzy Sikorski (2014), Mikołaj Kopernik na Warmii oraz jego podróże do Wilna i Królewca. Janusz Jasiński (2014). Professor Kant – Największą Chlubą Królewca. ISBN 978-83-64736-19-3.
14. Sikorski Jerzy (2015). "The mystery of Nicolaus Copernicus's grave – myths and reality". Peer-reviewed article by Professor Karolina Targosz, Habilitated Doctor in Humanities (Ludwik and Aleksander Birkenmajer Institute for the History of Science, Polish Academy of Sciences, Polish Academy of Sciences), translated by Mr. Filip Klepacki. Kraków, 2015. Michał Kokowski (ed.), The Nicolaus Copernicus Grave Mystery. A Dialogue Of Experts Polish Academy Of Arts And Sciences, 2015, Kraków, Poland.
