= Extracorporeal shockwave therapy =

Ultrasonic, non-invasive, outpatient treatment

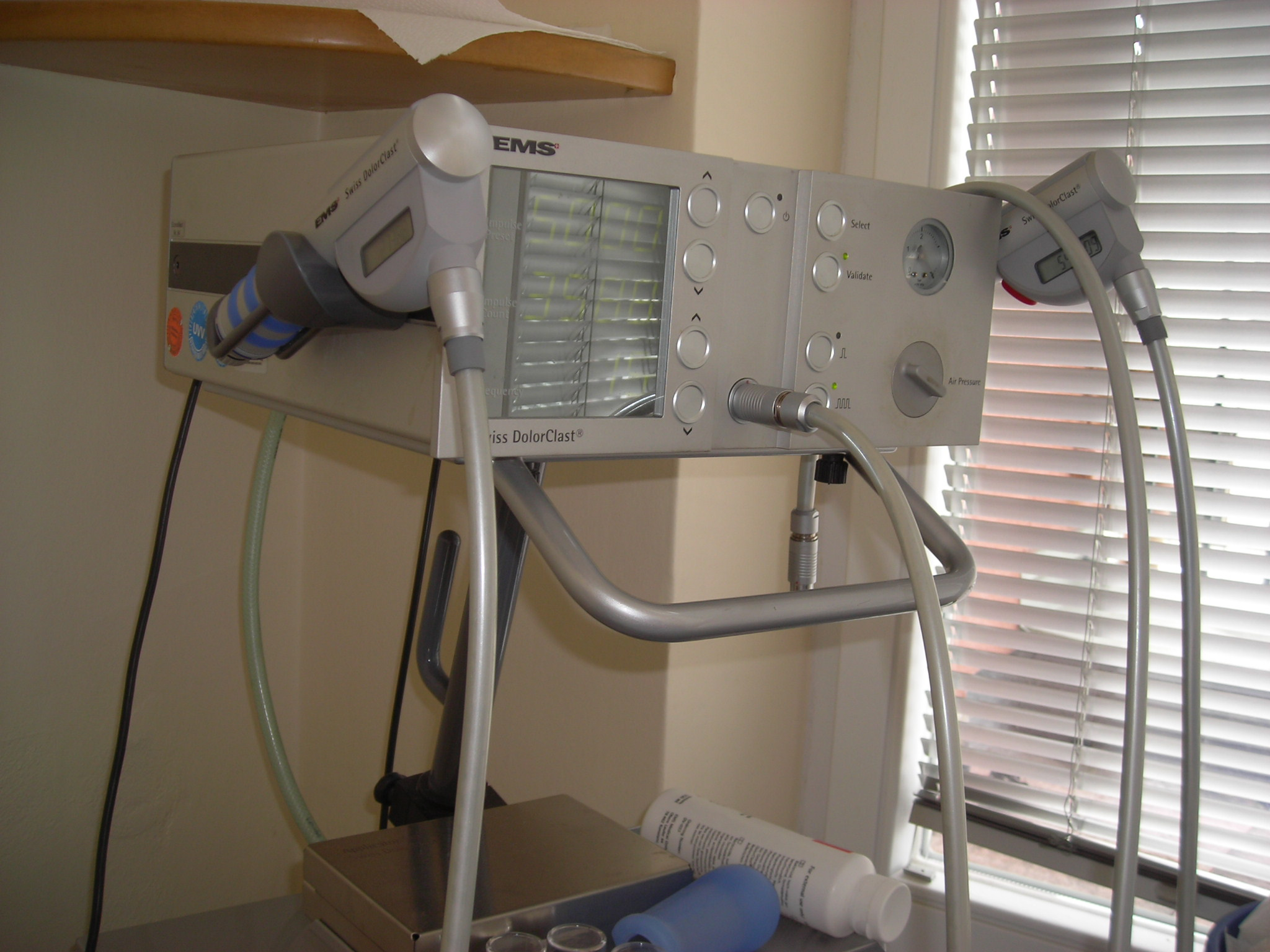
- ESWT device (EMS Swiss DolorClast)
- ICD-10-PCS: 6A93
- ICD-9-CM: 98.5

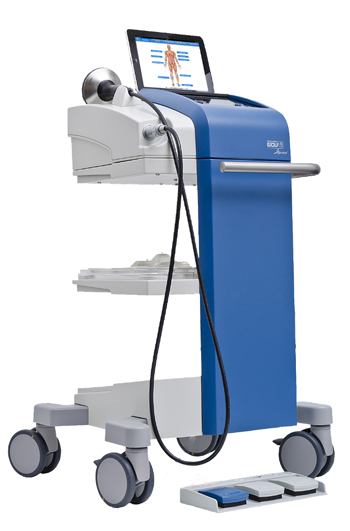
ESWT device

Extracorporeal shockwave therapy (ESWT) is a treatment using powerful acoustic pulses, It is commonly used to treat kidney stones, in physical therapy, and in orthopedics.

== History ==
Beginning in 1969, funded by the German Ministry of Defense, Dornier began a study of the effects of shock waves on tissue. In 1972, on the basis of Dornies' preliminary studies, an agreement was reached with Egbert Schmiedt, director of the urologic clinic at LMU Munich. The development of the Dornier lithotripter progressed through prototypes, culminating in February 1980 with the first treatment of a human. The production and distribution of the Dornier HM3 lithotripter began in late 1983, and ESWT was approved by the U.S. Food and Drug Administration in 1984.

In the 1980s people using ESWT for kidney stones noticed that it appeared to increase bone density in nearby bones, leading them to explore it for orthopedic purposes.

== Medical applications ==
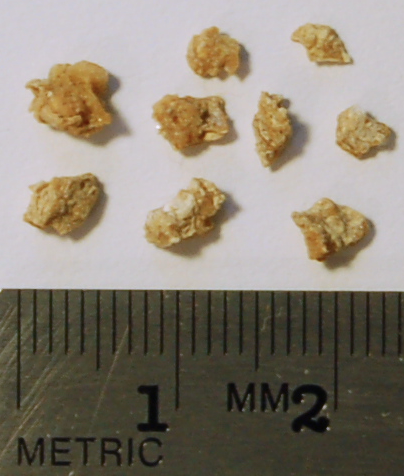
Some of the passed fragments of a 1-cm calcium oxalate stone that was smashed using lithotripsy

=== Lithotripsy ===
The most common use of extracorporeal shockwave therapy for lithotripsy to treat kidney stones (urinary calculosis), biliary calculi (stones in the gallbladder or in the liver), salivary stones, and pancreatic stones.

Lithotripsy uses high-intensity acoustic waves (HI-EWST). The patient is usually sedated or anesthetized in order to help them remain still and reduce discomfort.

=== Physical therapy ===
Extracorporeal shockwave therapy is used as a second line measure to treat tennis elbow, shoulder rotator cuff pain, Achilles tendinitis, plantar fasciitis, and greater trochanteric pain syndrome.

ESWT is used to aid in recovering normal muscle tone following various disorders. This use was demonstrated in patients with frozen shoulders compared to therapeutic ultrasound with exercises.

ESWT is used to increase cellular metabolism and to speed revascularisation.

=== Orthopedics ===
Medium intensity ESWT (MI-EWST) is also used to promote bone healing and treat bone necrosis. It is an effective alternative to surgical treatment of non-healing fractures. Sedation is not required.

=== Wounds ===
MI-ESWT is used for wound healing and has shown positive results in short-term and long-term outcomes in diabetic patients with foot ulcers. Randomised controlled trials into the use of ESWT for healing venous leg ulcers are needed as there is a lack of evidence in this area. Sedation is not required.

=== Erectile dysfunction ===
Low-intensity extracorporeal shock wave therapy (LI-ESWT) has been used as a treatment for erectile dysfunction (ED). It differs from palliative options by aiming to restore natural erectile function by inducing cellular microtrauma, triggering the release of angiogenic factors and promoting neovascularization in treated tissue.

Clinical studies, including double-blind randomized trials, have demonstrated LI-ESWT's ability to improve erectile function and penile hemodynamics in men with vasculogenic ED. Sedation is not required.

== Veterinary use ==
ESWT is commonly used for treating orthopedic problems in horses, including tendon and ligament injuries, kissing spine, navicular syndrome, and arthritis. The evidence for these uses is weak.

== Research ==
In response to concerns raised by NICE, in 2012 a study called the Assessment of the Effectiveness of ESWT for Soft Tissue Injuries was launched (ASSERT).

In a 2008 study involving 23 patients with chronic Achilles tendinopathy, 20 reported improvement in their condition and pain scores after ESWT; three saw no change, and none reported any worsening.

In the UK, the National Institute for Health and Care Excellence (NICE) reported that the evidence for ESWT in most indications is conflicting, and therefore ESWT should be used only under special arrangements for clinical governance and audit. Two 2017 reviews reported similar findings, with moderate level evidence at best.

As of 2018 use of ESWT had been studied as a potential treatment for chronic prostatitis/chronic pelvic pain syndrome in three small studies; short-term improvements in symptoms and few adverse effects were reportred, but the medium-term results are unknown, and the results are difficult to generalize due to the low quality of the studies.

== See also ==
- Laser lithotripsy
- Histotripsy
