= Nicolas Heurteloup =

Nicolas Heurteloup was a French military physician and surgeon. He was born on 26 November 1750 in Tours (Indre-et-Loire ) and died in Paris on 27 March 1812. He succeeded Pierre-François Percy (1754–1825) as chief surgeon of the Grande Armée, and had himself as his successor Dominique-Jean Larrey (1766–1842). He was the father of physician Charles Louis Stanislas Heurteloup (1793–1864).

== Biography ==
Born in Tours, Nicolas Heurteloup began his medical studies in that city. He finished them in Paris. He then joined the army. Heurteloup made his career under the Ancien Regime, the Revolution, the Consulate and the Empire. He attained the rank of Surgeon in 1790 and of first army surgeon in 1795. In 1804 he was inspector general of the health service and chief surgeon of the Grande Armée in 1808, replacing Percy. His work earned him the esteem of the Emperor Napoleon, who quoted him in the bulletin that followed the Battle of Wagram, and made him an Officer of the Legion of Honor in 1809 and a Baron in 1810.

Gravely ill, he gave way to Larrey in 1812 and died a month later, on 27 March 1812, in Paris.

== Sources ==
- DUPONT Michel, Dictionnaire historique des Médecins dans et hors de la Médecine, Larousse (éd.), Paris, 1999 (in French).
- HENRY René, Un grand Tourangeau : le baron Nicolas Heurteloup, chirurgien en chef des armées de la Révolution et de l'Empire, Centre médical d'études et de recherches (éd.), 1957 (in French).
- PINÇON Charles, Le baron Nicolas Heurteloup, premier chirurgien des armées de l'Empire, ANRT (éd.), Lille, 2000 (in French).
- Biography of Nicolas Heurteloup on the Napoleon & Empire website (in English).
