= William Thornhill (surgeon) =

English surgeon

- Occupation: Surgeon

William Thornhill (fl. 1723–1755) was an English surgeon.

== Biography ==
Thornhill was a member of one of the younger branches of the great Dorset family of Thornhull of Woolland, a nephew of Sir James Thornhill. He was educated in Bristol under ‘old Rosewell,’ a noted barber-surgeon of the city. He was elected on 20 May 1737 at the surgeons' hall in the market-place to be the first surgeon to the Bristol Infirmary founded in 1735.

His attendance at the infirmary was so remiss that he more than once fell under the censure of the ‘house visitors,’ and in 1754 he was called upon to resign his office. He refused to do so, and it was not until June 1755 that he retired. His services were, however, recognised by a unanimous vote of the committee. He left Bristol and practised for a short time at Oxford, but without much success, and he finally retired to Yorkshire, where he died.

He married, in 1730, Catherine (d. 1782), daughter of Richard Thompson, a wine merchant of York, and by her had a daughter Anne, who married in 1749 Nathaniel Wraxall of Mayse Hill, near Bristol, and by him became the mother of Sir Nathaniel William Wraxall, who wrote the ‘Historical Memoirs of my Own Time.’

Thornhill claims notice as one of the earliest English surgeons to adopt and improve the operation of suprapubic lithotomy. The records of his work, published by his colleague, John Middleton, M.D., prove that his experience in the operation and his success were greater than any contemporary English surgeon could show. He performed his first suprapubic operation on a boy privately on 3 February 1722–3. In 1727, when his cases were recorded by Middleton, he had performed like operations thirteen times. He did not confine his attention to this part of his profession, for he was also celebrated as a man-midwife. He was a handsome man, of polished manners, and habitually wore an entire suit of black velvet with an elegant steel-handled rapier.
