= Laser lithotripsy =

- Specialty: Urology
- ICD-9-CM: 98
- MeSH: D017602

Laser lithotripsy (LL) is a surgical procedure which uses lasers to break down and remove stones from the urinary tract, such as in the kidney, ureter, bladder, or urethra. When it involves a ureteroscopy, the procedure is more specifically called ureteroscopic laser lithotripsy (ULL).

== History ==
Laser lithotripsy was invented at the Wellman Center for Photo Medicine at Massachusetts General Hospital in the 1980s to remove impacted urinary stones. Optical fibers carry light pulses that pulverize the stone. Candela licensed the technology and released the first commercial laser lithotripsy system.

Today, laser lithotripsy is recommended in current urological guidelines, such as those of the American Urological Association (AUA) or the European Association of Urology (EAU), as a standard treatment for the endoscopic management of urinary stones. The choice of laser type, fibre size, and energy settings is adjusted individually according to stone size, composition, and location. The use of holmium lasers for endoscopic stone treatment is also explicitly recommended in current guidelines, while thulium laser systems are increasingly included as alternative options.

== Procedure ==
The procedure is part of endourology, a subspecialty of urology focused on minimally invasive techniques within the urinary tract. A urologist inserts a scope into the urinary tract to locate the stone. The scope may be a cystoscope, ureteroscope, renoscope or nephroscope. An optical fiber is inserted through the working channel of the scope, and laser light is directly emitted to the stone. The stone is fragmented and the remaining pieces are collected in a "basket" or washed out of the urinary tract, along with the finer particulate "dust". The procedure is most commonly performed under general anesthesia, although local anesthesia may be feasible in selected cases. It is widely available in most hospitals in the world.

== Comparison with extracorporeal shockwave therapy ==
Laser lithotripsy has been evaluated against extracorporeal shockwave therapy (ESWT), finding both to be safe and effective. ESWT may be safer for small stones (<10 mm), but less effective for 10–20 mm stones. A 2013 meta-analysis found LL can treat larger stones (> 2 cm) with good stone-free and complication rates.

Holmium laser lithotripsy had superior initial success and re-treatment rate compared to ESWT in a 2013 trial. While ESWT is limited to the non-invasive fragmentation of urinary stones, laser-based endoscopic techniques are more versatile, as they can be used not only for lithotripsy but also for soft tissue applications, including the endoscopic treatment of benign prostatic hyperplasia (BPH) and other intraluminal urological procedures.

== Lasers ==
Pulsed dye lasers have been used with fiber diameters of 200–550 microns for lithotripsy of biliary and urinary stones.

Initially 504 nm dye lasers were used, then holmium lasers were studied in the 1990s.

Holmium:YAG (Ho:YAG) lasers are a type of solid-state laser; they have a wavelength of 2,100 nm (infrared) and are used for medical procedures in urology and other areas. Ho:YAG lasers have been considered the "gold-standard laser for lithotripsy" since the mid-1990s. Ho:YAG laser machines are loud, contain fragile components including lenses and mirrors, consume a large amount of electricity, and usually require a dedicated power source.

They have qualities of CO_{2} and Nd:YAG lasers, with ablative and coagulation effects. Holmium laser use results in smaller fragments than those produced by 320- or 365-micron pulsed-dye lasers, as well as electrohydraulic and mechanical methods.

More recently, thulium fiber lasers (TFL) have increasingly been used for laser lithotripsy. The frequency of TFLs increased during the start of the 21st century. TFLs have several advantages compared to Ho:YAG lasers, including a four times lower ablation threshold, a near single-mode beam profile, and higher pulse rates. In contrast to other laser settings - particularly fragmentation-oriented techniques that generate larger fragments requiring basket extraction - dusting techniques produce fine dust and small stone fragments that can often be evacuated spontaneously via urine flow or irrigation. This may reduce the need for basket use, which can prolong the procedure depending on stone location and increase the use of additional disposable instruments. In addition, dusting approaches are associated with reduced retropulsion, higher stone-free rates, and shorter overall procedure times compared to conventional Ho:YAG systems. TFL devices are also smaller and lighter than comparable Ho:YAG devices, and use just 10% of the electricity that a Ho:YAG laser would, potentially allowing for the use of multiple laser devices on a single circuit.

Several clinical studies and meta-analyses have demonstrated the effectiveness as well as advantages of TFL. In a prospective, randomized trial by Øyvind Ulvik et al. (2022), 120 patients undergoing ureteroscopic lithotripsy were randomized to TFL or Ho:YAG. The stone-free rate was 92% in the TFL group versus 67% in the Ho:YAG group, operative time was shorter with TFL (49 min vs 57 min), and intraoperative bleeding occurred in 5% of TFL cases compared with 22% of Ho:YAG cases. While Ho:YAG lasers currently remain the guideline-recommended reference standard, TFL is increasingly being adopted in clinical practice and is being progressively incorporated into contemporary guidelines as an alternative treatment option.

== See also ==
- Kidney stone
