= Irvine Loudon =

British doctor and medical historian

Irvine Loudon (1 August 1924 – 7 January 2015) was a British doctor and a medical historian on childbirth fever and maternal mortality.

== Biography ==
Loudon was born in Cardiff on 1 August 1924. His father, Andrew Walker Buist Loudon was a general practitioner who had served in the Royal Army Medical Corps and his mother was Sarah Margaret Black (Morag), née Lees, who was a trained midwife. He attended Llandaff Cathedral School and Dauntsey's School before serving in the RAF during World War II. After the war, he studied medicine at Queen's College, Oxford, graduating in 1951. He settled down as general practitioner in Wantage, where he also acted as a medical historian

Loudon's time as a medical historian was focused on childbirth fever and maternal mortality. His published writings included studies of the history of medicine, with a special interest in the history of general practice and maternal death in childbirth. His oil paintings, drawings and etchings were shown at several galleries: Bankside Gallery London, UK and Dolphin Gallery, Wantage, UK, Branson Art Gallery, Rosedale, Lake Balsam, Ontario, Canada.

In 1948 he married Jean Norman, daughter of a university professor and they had five children together. He received a fellowship from the Wellcome Trust, and was made an honorary fellow of Green College. Loudon suffered from vascular dementia in his later years and died on 7 January 2015 at Wantage Community Hospital.
