= Michaab =

Early medical device for crushing stones in the bladder

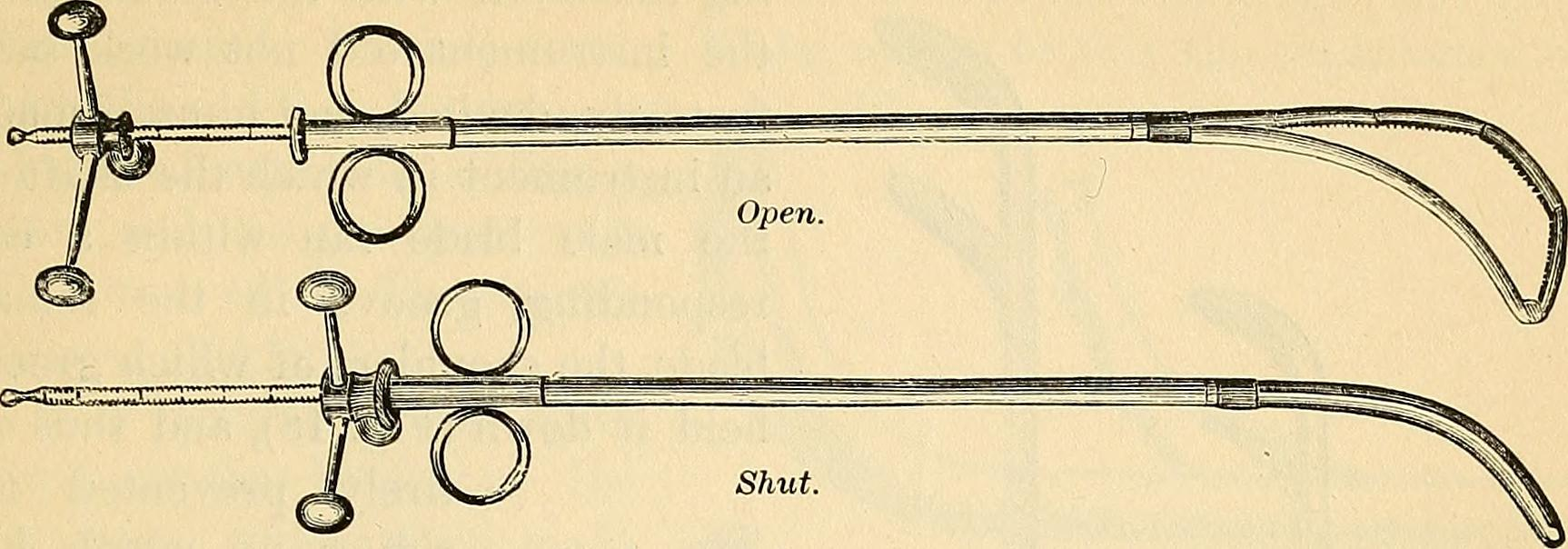
An early lithotrite showing the device in open and closed positions

The michaab was an early medical device, invented by Al-Zahrawi, a form of lithotrite which was minimally-invasive. He was able to crush the stone inside the bladder without the need for a surgical incision. It was later modified by Jean Civiale, and was used to perform transurethral lithotripsy, the first known minimally invasive surgery, to crush stones inside the bladder without having to open the abdomen (lithotomy). To remove a calculus the instrument was inserted through the urethra and holes bored in the stone. Afterwards, it was crushed with the same instrument and resulting fragments aspirated or allowed to flow normally with urine.
