= Jean Civiale =

French urologist (1792–1867)

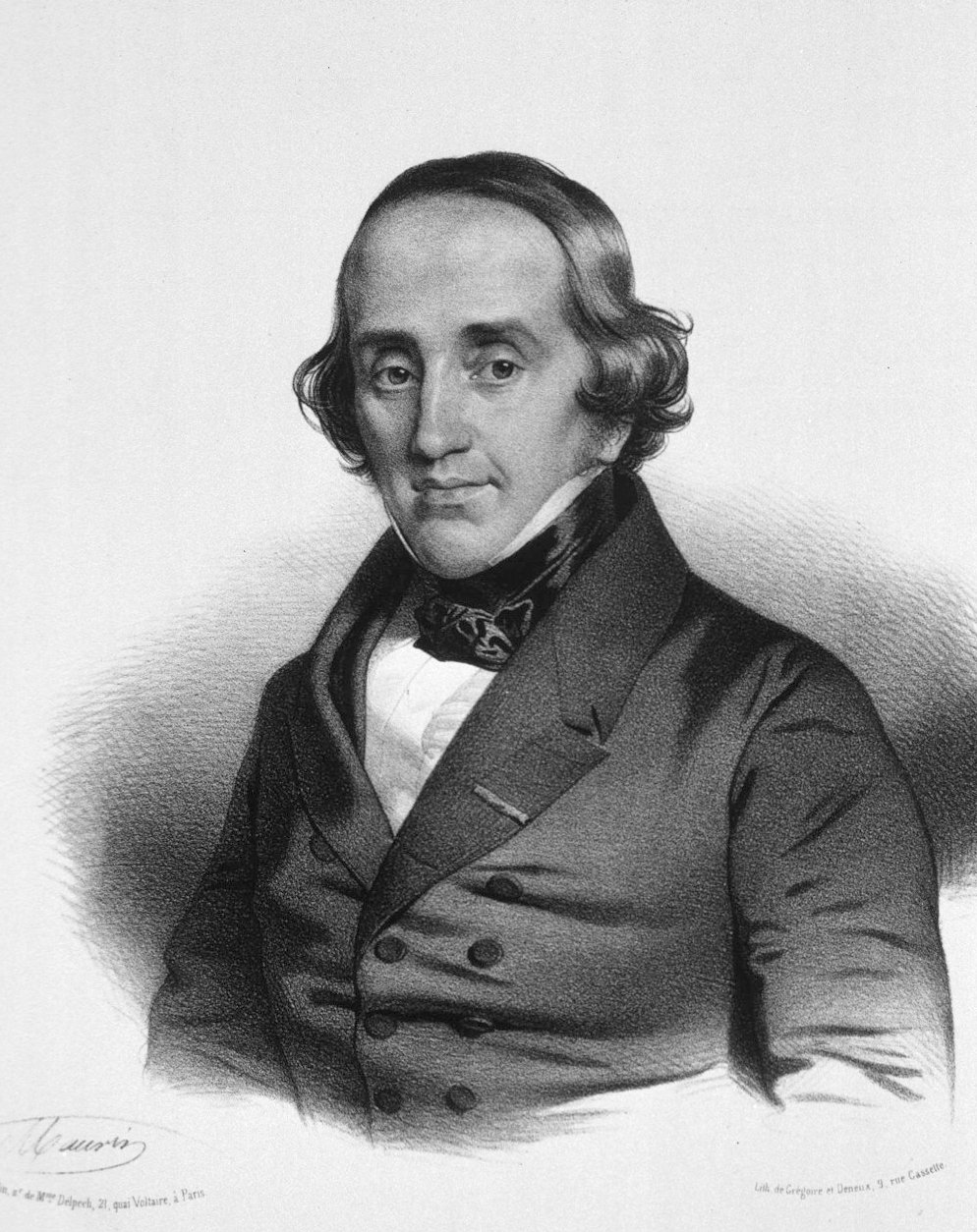
Jean Civiale

Jean Civiale (1792–1867) was a French surgeon and urologist, who, in 1823, invented a surgical instrument (the lithotrite) and performed transurethral lithotripsy, the first known minimally invasive surgery, to crush stones inside the bladder without having to open the abdomen (lithotomy). To remove a calculus, Civiale inserted his instrument through the urethra and bored holes in the stone. Afterwards, he crushed it with the same instrument and aspired the resulting fragments or let them flow normally with urine.

Civiale founded the first urology service in the world, at the Necker Hospital in Paris.

Civiale has been also recently recognized as a pioneer of evidence-based medicine. In 1835, the Académie des Sciences in Paris commissioned a report on the statistical research that had been conducted by him on a wider scale throughout Europe, with the aim of proving that bladder lithotripsy was superior to lithotomy. Civiale used for the first time the method of comparing the relative mortality rates between both groups of patients, and found that the new lithotripsy method had had 7 deaths in 307 operations (2.2%), while the old lithotomy method had 1,024 deaths in 5,443 operations (18.8%). For this study, he received in 1836 the Montyon Prize from the Academy; it was published in 1836 as Parallèle des divers moyens de traiter les calculeux. One of the members of the committee was none other than famous mathematician Siméon Poisson; as a consequence, the Academy recommended that the medical uses of probability should be better studied.

Among the many students of Civiale, Sir Henry Thompson, a British surgeon and urologist, took the instrument and the technique to Great Britain and became quite famous with it, after operating on King Leopold I of Belgium.

In 1840, he was elected a foreign member of the Royal Swedish Academy of Sciences.

== Principal publications ==
- De la Lithotritie, ou brolement de la pierre, (Paris, 1827)
- Lettres sur la Lithotritie, &c. (1827)
- Traite pratique et historique de la Lithotritie (1847)
- Resultats Cliniques de la Lithotritie pendent les Annes 1860–64 (1865)
