= Lithotripsy =

Medical procedure for breaking up hardened masses

- ICD-9-CM: 98
- MeSH: D008096
- MedlinePlus: 007113

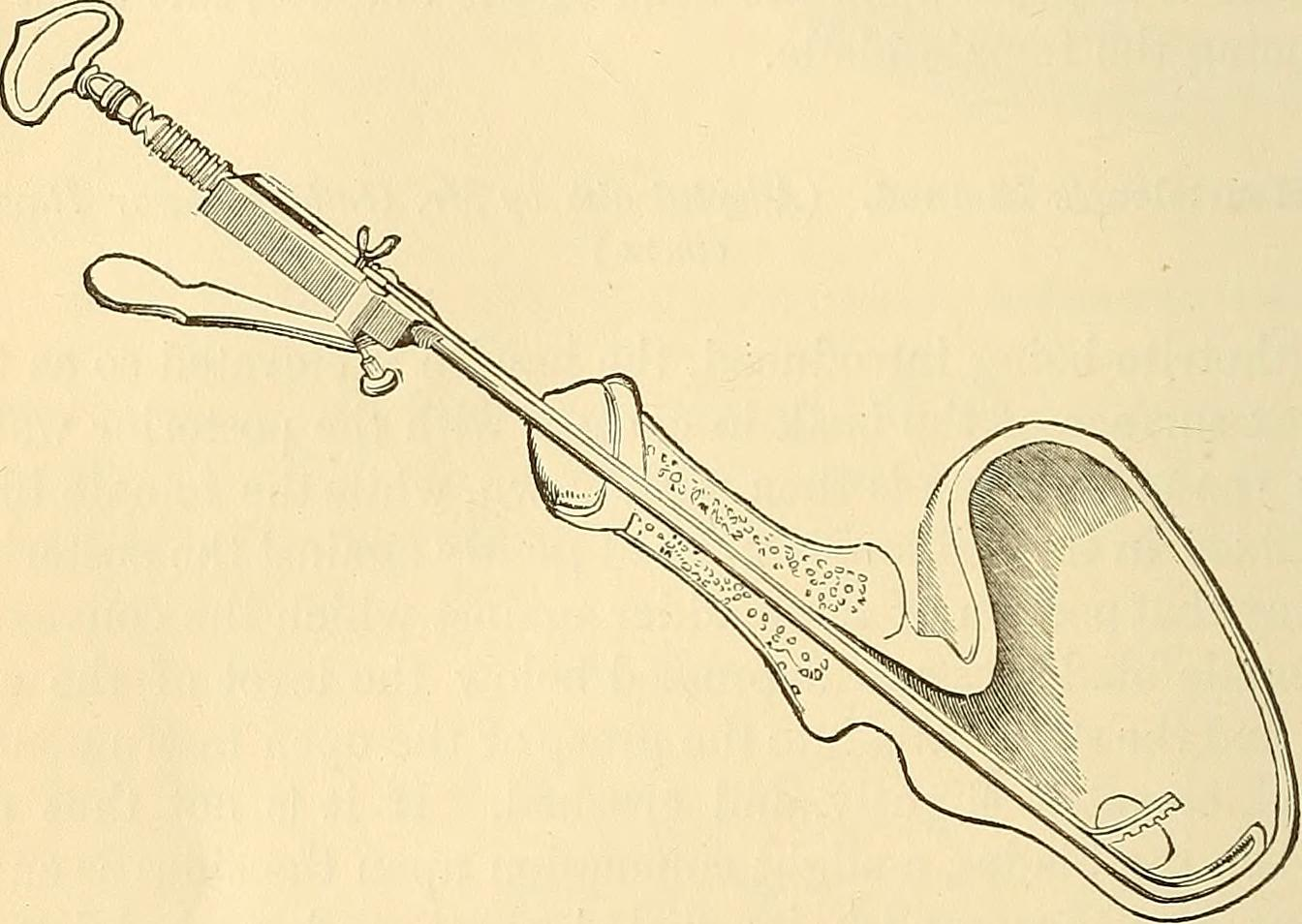

Lithotripsy is a procedure involving the physical destruction of hardened masses like kidney stones, bezoars, or gallstones, which may be done non-invasively. The term is derived from Greek words meaning "breaking (or pulverizing) stones" (litho- + τρίψω [tripso]).

== Applications ==
Lithotripsy is used to break up hardened masses like kidney stones, bezoars, sialolithiasis, or gallstones.

== Contraindications ==
Commonly cited absolute contraindications to shock wave lithotripsy (SWL) include pregnancy, coagulopathy or use of platelet aggregation inhibitors, aortic aneurysms, severe untreated hypertension, and untreated urinary tract infections.

== Techniques ==
Some lithotripsy techniques are non-invasive procedures.

- Extracorporeal shock wave therapy (lithotripsy)
- Intracorporeal (endoscopic lithotripsy):
  - Laser lithotripsy: Established treatment for ureteral and renal stones of various sizes, including small, medium, and large calculi, with good stone-free and complication rates
  - Electrohydraulic lithotripsy
  - Mechanical lithotripsy
  - Ultrasonic lithotripsy: safer for small stones (<10 mm)

== History ==
Surgery was the only method to remove stones too large to pass until French surgeon and urologist Jean Civiale in 1832 invented a surgical instrument (the lithotrite) to crush stones inside the urinary bladder without having to open the abdomen. To remove a calculus, Civiale inserted his instrument through the urethra and bored holes in the stone. Afterwards, he crushed it with the same instrument and aspirated the resulting fragments or let them flow normally with urine.

Lithotripsy replaced using lithotrites as the most common treatment beginning in the mid-1980s. In extracorporeal shock wave lithotripsy (ESWL), external shockwaves are focused at the stone to pulverize it. Ureteroscopic methods use a rigid or flexible scope to reach the stone and direct mechanical or light energy at it. Endoscopy can use lasers as well as other modes of energy delivery: ultrasound or electrohydraulics.

ESWL was first used on kidney stones in 1980. It is also applied to gallstones and pancreatic stones. External shockwaves are focused and pulverize the stone which is located by imaging. The first shockwave lithotriptor approved for human use was the Dornier HM3 (human model 3) derived from a device used for testing aerospace parts. Second generation devices used piezoelectricity or electromagnetism generators. American Urological Association guidelines consider ESWL a potential primary treatment for stones between 4 mm and 2 cm.

Electrohydraulic lithotripsy is an industrial technique for fragmenting rocks by using electrodes to create shockwaves. It was applied to bile duct stones in 1975. It can damage tissue and is mostly used in biliary tract specialty centers. Pneumatic mechanical devices have been used with endoscopes, commonly for large and hard stones. Pneumatic lithotripsy has also been successfully applied in the treatment of salivary stones during sialendoscopy, offering a minimally invasive alternative for large or impacted calculi while preserving the salivary duct anatomy.

Laser lithotripsy was introduced in the 1980s. Pulsed dye lasers emit 504 nm (cyan-colored) light that is delivered to the stone by optical fibers through a scope. Holmium:YAG lasers were then developed and produce smaller fragments and have long been considered the standard technology for endoscopic lithotripsy according to major urological guidelines such as those of the American Urological Association and the European Association of Urology. More recently, thulium fibre lasers (TFL) have been introduced for ureteroscopic lithotripsy and offer several advantages over Holmium:YAG lasers, including higher stone‑free rates, shorter operative times, and reduced stone retropulsion. Several clinical studies and meta-analyses have demonstrated these benefits, suggesting that TFL may increasingly replace Ho:YAG as the preferred laser for endoscopic stone treatment.

Endovascular lithotripsy is an angioplasty procedure using a balloon internally fitted with an ultrasound generator. It can be used in the reduction of very calcified coronary arteries, with or without the combined usage of stents.

== See also ==
- Histotripsy
