= Elzevir =

Elzevir may refer to:

== Places ==
- Elzevir, Ontario, a township in Hastings County
- Elzévir is a street that runs through the 3rd arrondissement of Paris. (See: 1, 2)
- Elzevir Lake, lake in the Moira River and Lake Ontario drainage basins in Tweed, Hastings County, Ontario, Canada
- Elzevir Creek, creek in the Moira River and Lake Ontario drainage basins in Tweed, Hastings County in Central Ontario, Canada

== People ==
- A pen name of Walter Murdoch
- The House of Elzevir, a celebrated family of Dutch booksellers, publishers, and printers of the 17th and early 18th centuries:
  - Abraham Elzevir (two by this name, father and son, 1592–1652), Dutch printer
  - Bonaventure Elzevir
  - Daniel Elzevir (published Richard Simon's work)
  - Isaac Elzevir (1596–1651), Dutch publisher and printer who began printing with one of the earliest printing press in the city of Leyden in the year 1617
  - Lodewijk Elzevir (c. 1540–1617), originally Lodewijk or Louis Elsevier or Elzevier, was a Dutch printer
  - Louis Elzevir (3 by this name, first was Lodewijk, then his son and grandson)

== Characters ==
- Elzevir the Dollmaker from the video game Blood Omen: The Legacy of Kain

== Other ==
- DTL Elzevir, a typeface by Christoffel van Dijck

== See also ==
- Ingeborg Elzevier (1936–2025), Dutch actress
- Elsevier (disambiguation)
