= Bladder stone =

Concretion of material in the urinary bladder

- Other names: vesical calculus, cystolith
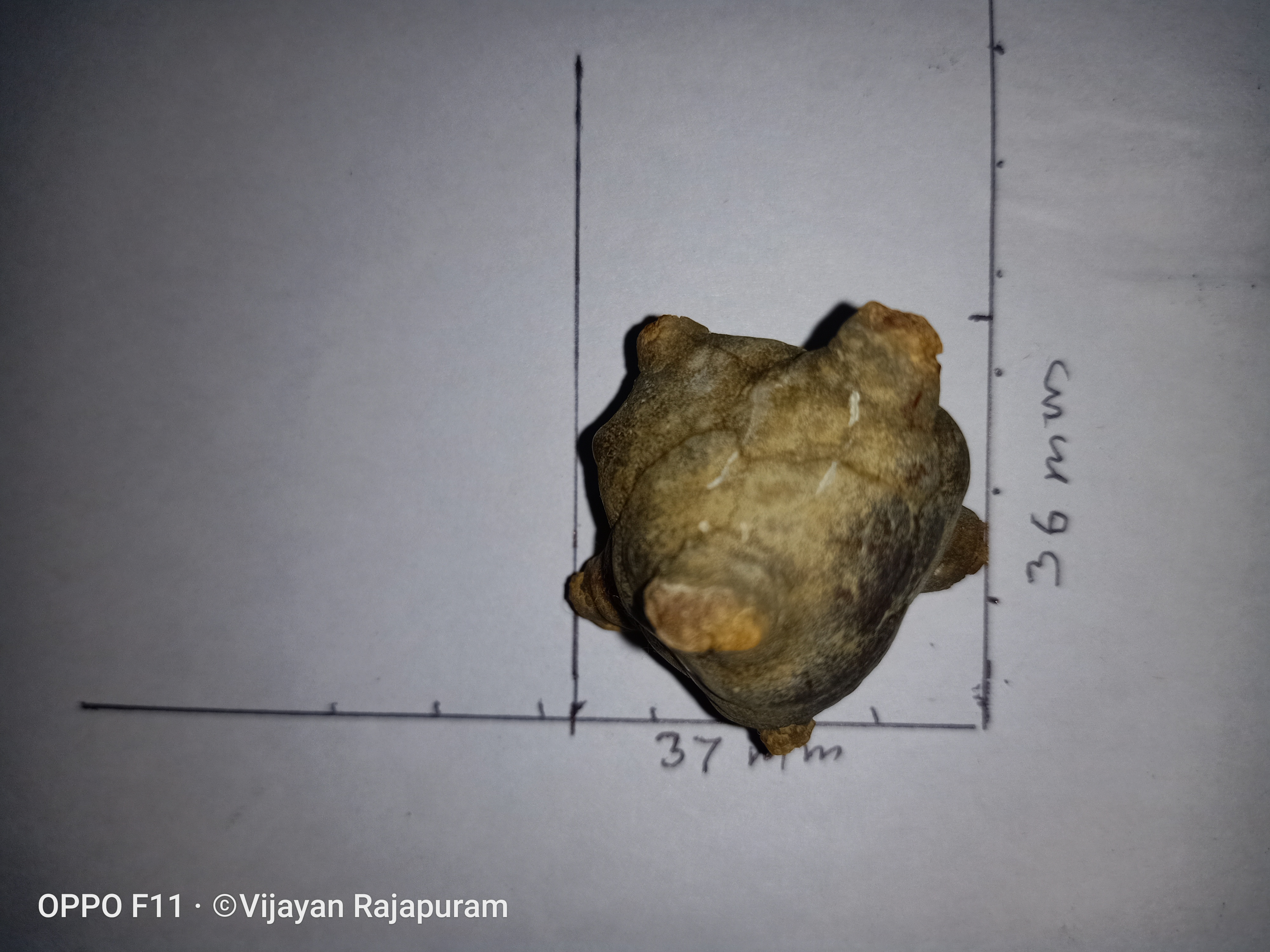
- A bladder stone removed from a patient.
- Specialty: Urology
- Symptoms: Pain when urinating
- Complications: Cystitis
- Causes: Overconcentration of minerals, dehydration
- Prevention: Drinking plenty of fluids
- Treatment: Citrus juice, vinegar, surgery

A bladder stone is a stone found in the urinary bladder.

== Signs and symptoms ==
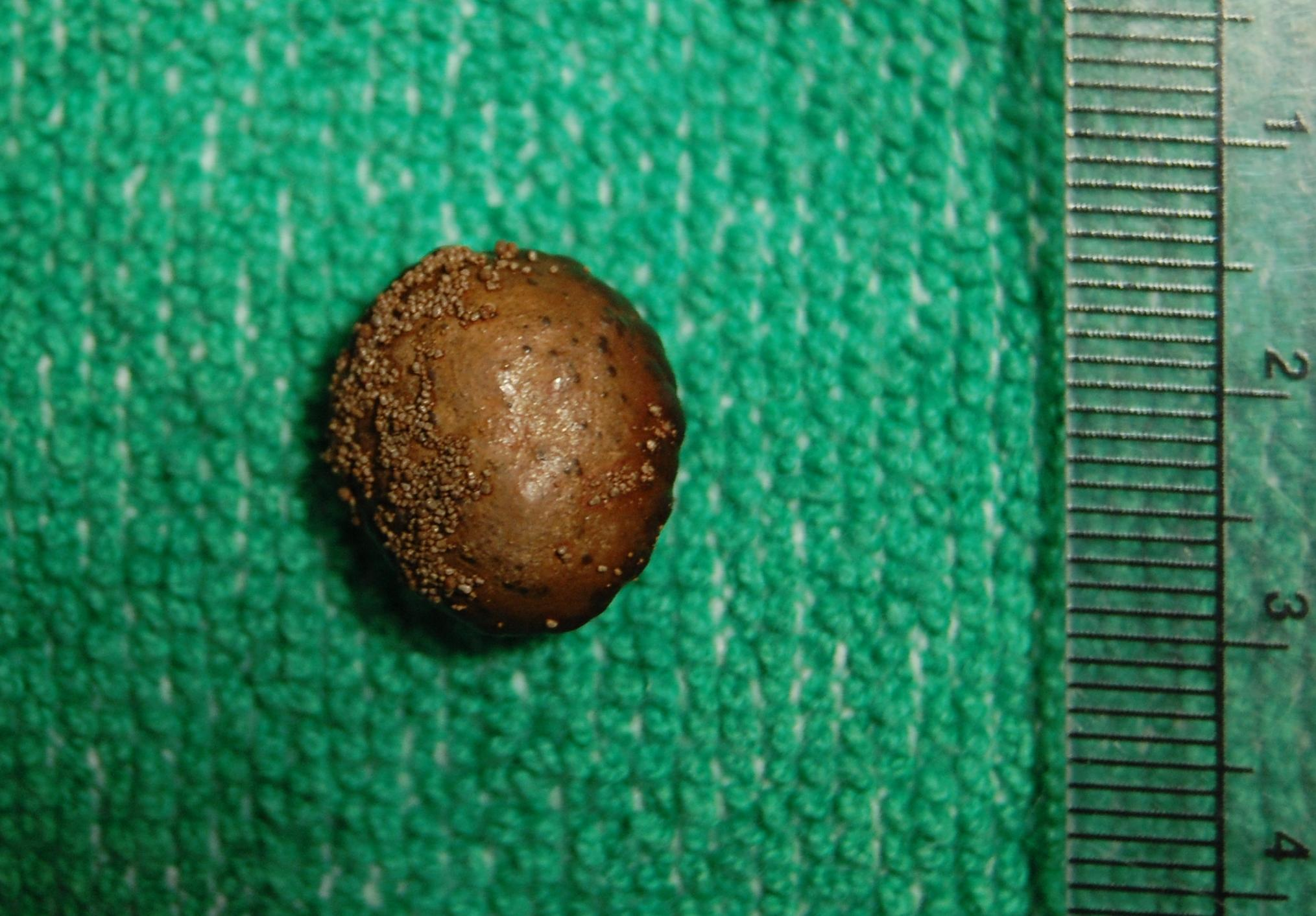
Bladder stones (14 mm diameter) incidentally found in a bladder diverticulum during transvesical prostatectomy (removal of the prostate via an incision in the bladder)

Bladder stones are small mineral deposits that can form in the bladder. In most cases bladder stones develop when the urine becomes very concentrated or when one is dehydrated. This allows for minerals, such as calcium or magnesium salts, to crystallize and form stones. Bladder stones vary in number, size and consistency. In some cases bladder stones do not cause any symptoms and are discovered as an incidental finding on a plain radiograph. However, when symptoms do occur, these may include severe lower abdominal and back pain, difficult urination, frequent urination at night, fever, painful urination and blood in the urine. The majority of individuals who are symptomatic will complain of pain which comes in waves. The pain may also be associated with nausea, vomiting and chills.

Bladder stones vary in their size, shape and texture- some are small, hard and smooth whereas others are huge, spiked and very soft. One can have one or multiple stones. Bladder stones are somewhat more common in men who have prostate enlargement. The large prostate presses on the urethra and makes it difficult to pass urine. Over time, stagnant urine collects in the bladder and minerals like calcium start to precipitate. Other individuals who develop bladder stones include those who have had spinal cord injury, paralysis, or some type of nerve damage. When nerves to the back are damaged, the bladder cannot empty, resulting in stagnant urine.

== Causes ==
Bladder stones may occur whenever the kidneys, bladder, or ureters become inflamed, which may occur when the urine becomes too concentrated or when the body becomes dehydrated. Minerals such as calcium and magnesium crystallize into the stones, which then can cause such symptoms as lower back or abdominal pain or difficulty with urination. The use of urinary catheters may cause a bladder stone. Individuals who are paralyzed or are unable to adequately pass urine may require the use of small plastic tubes (catheters) placed into the bladder. The use of these tubes may lead to an infection, which irritates the bladder, resulting in stone formation. Finally, a kidney stone may travel down the ureter into the bladder and become a bladder stone. There is some evidence indicating that chronic irritation of the bladder by retained stones may increase the chance of bladder cancer. Urinary schistosomiasis, a disease caused by the digenean trematode Schistosoma haematobium, has been implicated in the development of vesical calculi. However, evidence accumulated thus far has not supported this hypothesis.

== Diagnosis ==
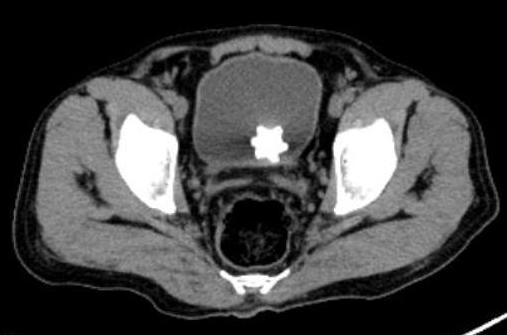
Large jackstone in the bladder of a 60-year-old man. Stone was removed by open cystolithotomy

The diagnosis of bladder stone includes urinalysis, ultrasonography, x rays or cystoscopy (inserting a small thin camera into the urethra and viewing the bladder). The intravenous pyelogram can also be used to assess the presence of kidney stones. This test involves injecting a radiocontrast agent which is passed into the urinary system. X-ray images are then obtained every few minutes to determine if there is any obstruction to the contrast as it is excreted into the bladder. Today, intravenous pyelogram has been replaced at many health centers by CT scans. CT scans are more sensitive and can identify very small stones not seen by other tests.

=== Classification ===
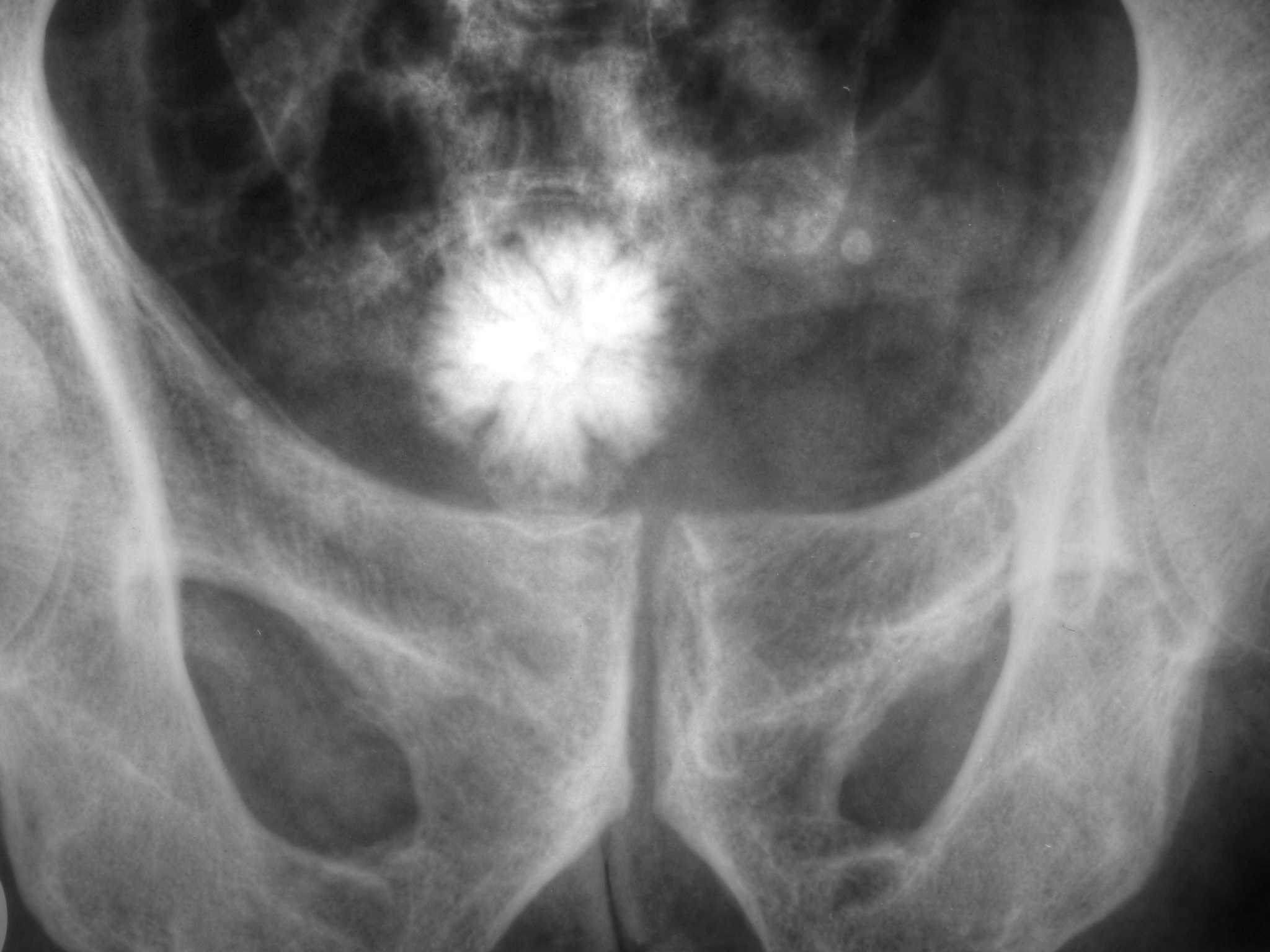
A star-shaped Jackstone urolith can be seen in the urinary bladder on this radiograph of the pelvis

Urinary stones may be composed of the following substances:

- Calcium oxalate monohydrate (whewellite)
- Calcium oxalate dihydrate (weddellite)
- Calcium phosphate
- Magnesium phosphate
- Ammonium phosphate
- Ammonium magnesium phosphate (struvite)
- Calcium hydroxyphosphate (apatite)
- Uric acid and its salts (urates)
- Cystine
- Xanthine
- Indigotin (rare)
- Urostealith (rare)
- Sulfonamide (rare)

=== Jackstone calculus ===
Jackstone calculi are rare bladder stones that have an appearance resembling toy jacks. They are almost always composed of calcium oxalate dihydrate and consist of a dense central core and radiating spicules. They are typically light brown with dark patches and are usually formed in the urinary bladder and rarely in the upper urinary tract. Their appearance on plain radiographs and computed tomography in human patients is usually easily recognizable. Jackstones often must be removed via cystolithotomy.

== Prevention ==
The best way to prevent bladder stones is to drink plenty of liquids. Juices containing citrate are thought to reduce the risk of stone formation. A study published in the Clinical Journal of the American Society of Nephrology indicate orange juice is more effective at preventing stone formation than other citrus juices. Men who have difficulty with urination due to prostate enlargement should seek treatment, however, urinating in a sitting position appears to improve bladder emptying which might decrease the risk of bladder stones forming.

Prevention in newborn children, especially in the first three months of life when most stones begin, is critical. Studies show that feeding newborn infants milk (mother's, cow or goat) with no substitutes or supplements until at least the third month has proven successful in preventing most stones.

== Management ==
Increasing fluid intake can facilitate the passage of small bladder stones. However, larger stones may require other methods of treatment. Fragmentation of bladder stones can be achieved by use of a cystoscope which is inserted into the bladder. The urologist visualizes the stone and uses ultrasonic energy or laser lithotripsy to cause fragmentation of the stones into small pieces, which are then flushed out of the bladder. This procedure requires anesthesia and may require admission to a hospital. Complications of this treatment include infection and damage to the bladder. Some stones are too large even for cystoscopic treatment and may require open cystotomy, in which an incision is made in the bladder and the stones are removed manually. For children with urinary stones, the evidence supporting treatment options is very weak and high quality trials are necessary to help guide clinical management.

=== Cystolithotomy ===
Cystolithotomy is a surgical procedure for the removal of bladder stones in the case that one has been deemed too large to pass naturally, such as developed jackstone calculi. This may require open surgery to remove the stone, however robotic cystolithotomy allows for a minimally invasive approach to remove the stone through much smaller incisions than the traditional approach. Most bladder stones can be dealt with by an endoscopic procedure, to avoid the need for a surgical incision.

An open cystolithotomy is performed under general anesthesia as an inpatient procedure. The first step is a cystoscopy to examine the bladder, then an incision is made in the lower abdomen. Once the stone is removed, the bladder is repaired with an absorbable stitch, and a catheter is inserted into the bladder via the urethra. Occasionally it is necessary to gently drip fluid in and out of the bladder for a period, as there is often some bleeding following the procedure. The majority of patients do not have major side effects following cystolithotomy, but it may be followed by a minor burning sensation and light bleeding. More serious side effects include bladder infection, a prolonged need of catheter use, and infection in the surgical incision. Rare side effects may include delayed bleeding requiring removal of clots or further surgery, injury to the urethra causing scar formation, fever and more serious infection requiring a longer hospital stay, and delayed healing of the bladder, which may require a further procedure.

== Etymology ==
Lithiasis (stone formation) in the bladder is called cystolithiasis (/ˌsɪstoʊlɪˈθaɪəsɪs/), from cysto- (bladder/cyst) + -lith (stone) + -iasis (disorder).

== History ==
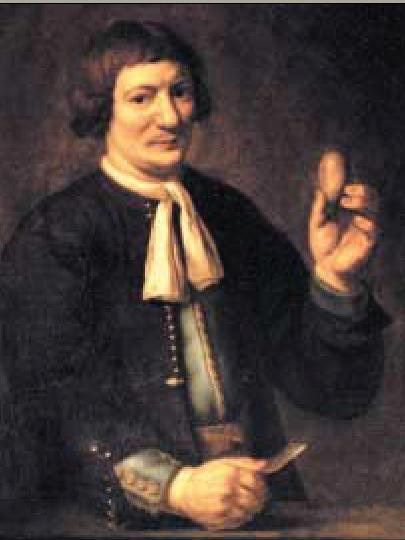
Portrait of Jan de Doot, by Carel van Savoyen, holding the bladder stone he removed from himself according to a 1652 account in the book Observationes Medicae by Nicolaes Tulp

Lithoclastic cystotomy is attributed to Ammonius Lithotomos (stone-cutter) of Alexandria, Egypt. The term "lithotomy" is derived from the same words (λιθοτομία (lithotomia) - stone-cutting). Aulus Cornelius Celsus wrote that Lithotomos developed instruments to break up and extract bladder stones. Celsus gave the first description of lithotomy as performed before and during his time, and the operation has ever since borne his name—the Celsian method.

== See also ==
- Kidney stone disease
- Ureter stone
