= House of Elsevier =

House of Elsevier may refer to:

- House of Elzevir, a Dutch printer of 17th and early 18th centuries
- Elsevier, an information and analytics company established in 1880
