= Johann Neander =

German physician (1596–1630)

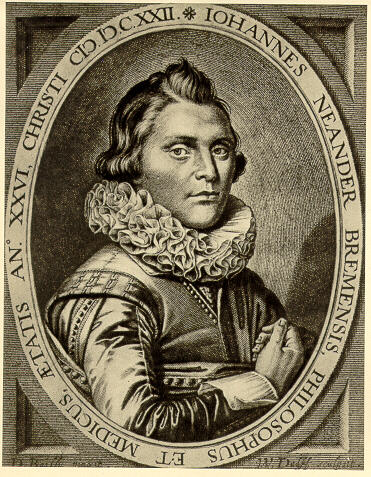

Johann Neander aka Johannes Neander (c.1596 Bremen – c.1630) was a German physician from Bremen, also a philosopher, writer and poet, best known for his 1626 work Tabacologia published by Isaac Elzevir of Leiden.

Neander's work extolled the medicinal virtues of tobacco, but also warned of the dangers inherent in its abuse – it was, he said, "a plant of God's own making, but the devil is likewise involved; excesses ruined both mind and body." His information was gleaned mainly from sixteenth-century herbals, and the work also shows the earliest known illustrations of native Americans cultivating and curing tobacco. Neander was particularly interested in tobacco's medicinal uses, and his work details several such remedies.

The book's illustrations are by Moses van Uyttenbroeck (c.1600–1646), a Dutch painter and engraver.
