= Savoyen =

Savoyen can refer to:

- Carel van Savoyen (1620/21–1665), a Flemish painter
- Mondeuse noire, a red French wine grape variety
