= Abraham Elzevir =

Dutch printer (1592–1652)

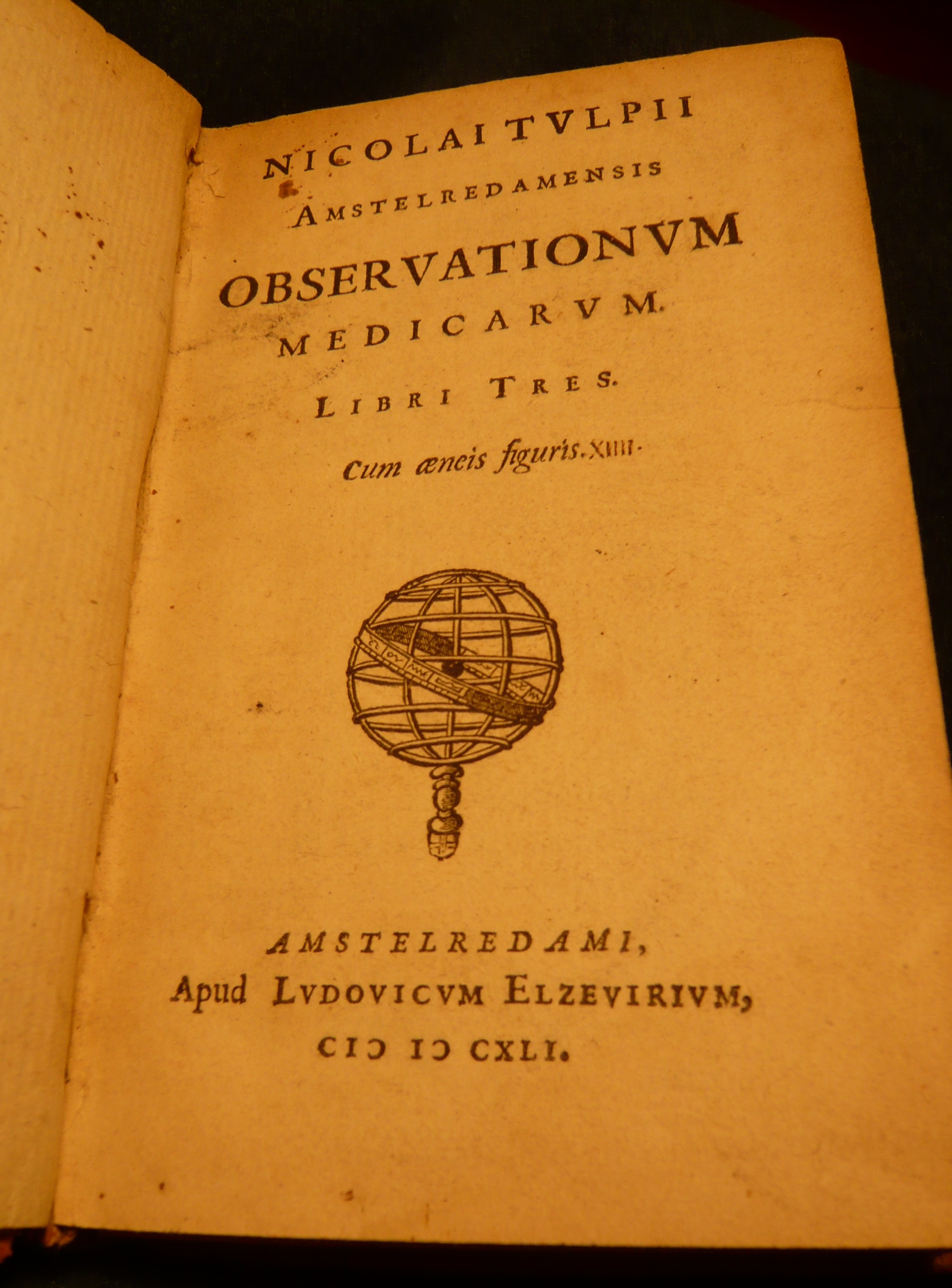
Title page from Prof. Nicolaes Tulp's book called Observacionum Medicarum, published by Ludovicum Elzevirium, published in Amsterdam in 1641

Abraham Elzevir (4 April 1592 — 14 August 1652) was a Dutch printer. Elzevir was born and died in Leiden. He inherited the House of Elzevir from his grandfather Louis Elzevir and his uncle Bonaventure Elzevir. In its best years it was reputedly the largest publishing business in the world, with branches in numerous European cities.

Abraham and Bonaventure launched a bestselling series of books called the Republics. Published in Latin between 1626 and 1629, each work in the series gave information on the geography, inhabitants, economy, and history of a particular country in Europe, Asia, Africa, or the Near East. The Republics are often considered the forerunner to the modern travel guide.
