= Elsevier (disambiguation) =

Elsevier is a publisher and information and analytics company.

Elsevier may also refer to:

- Elsevier (magazine), a Dutch-language magazine
- Elsevier Masson, a French publisher
- Arnout Elsevier (1579 – c. 1656), Dutch painter

== See also ==
- Elsevere
- Elsevier Awards
- Elzevir (disambiguation)
