= Isaac Elzevir =

Dutch printer and publisher

Elsevier logo

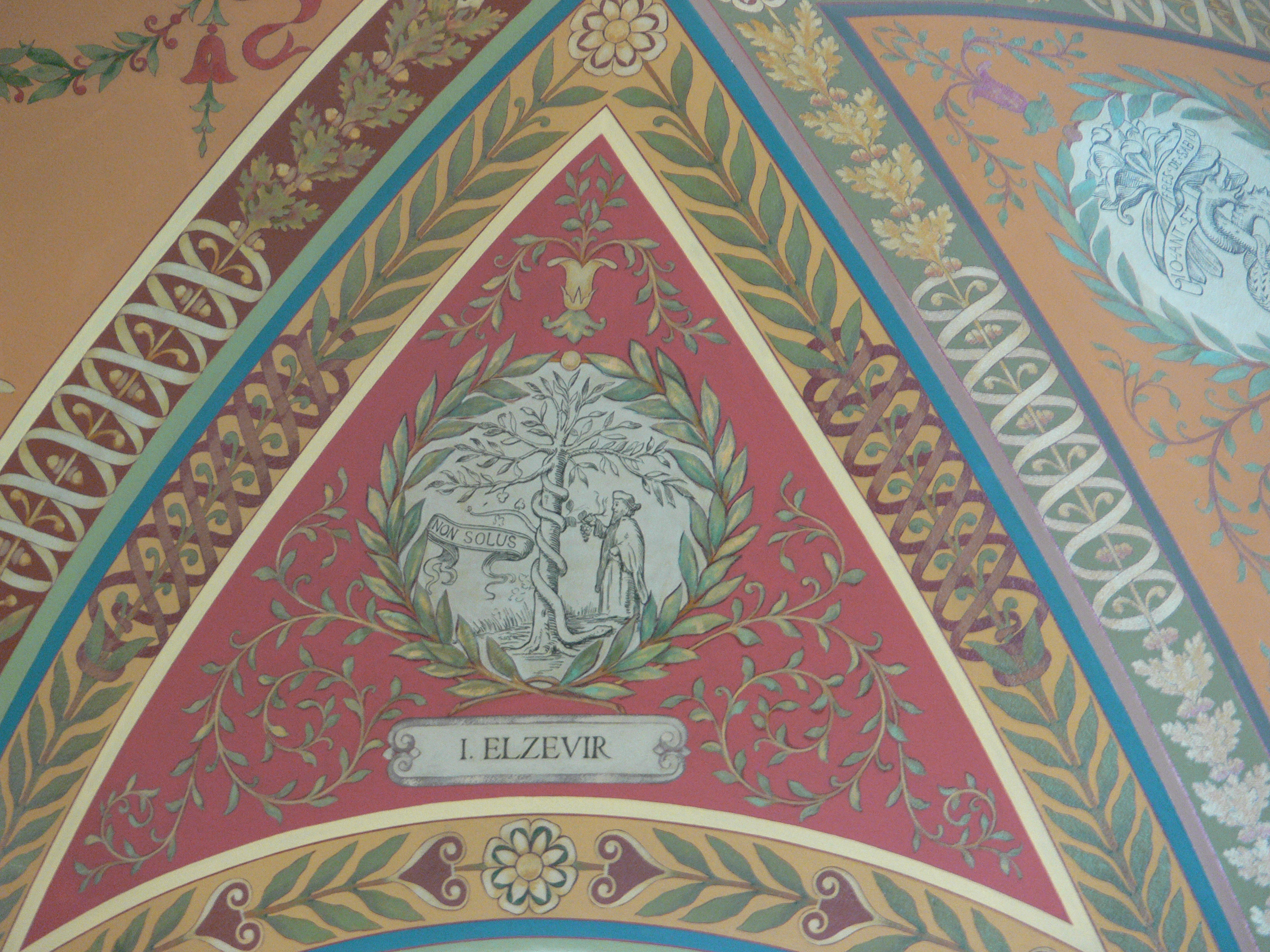
Elsevir printer mark depicted in the Library of Congress

Isaac Elzevir (11 March 1596, in Leiden – 8 October 1651, in Cologne), in Dutch Isaac Elsevier, was a Dutch publisher and printer who began printing with one of the earliest printing presses in the city of Leyden in 1617. Although the House of Elzevir ceased publishing in 1712, the modern Dutch Elsevier company was founded in 1880 and took its name from the historic Dutch publishing house.

== Biography ==
Isaac was the second of Matthijs Elzevir's three sons and grandson of Lodewijk Elzevir, founder of the House of Elzevir. His publishing career spanned nine years and dominated the Leiden University printing business.

Isaac began his career buying a print shop in Leyden in 1616 and by 1620 was appointed Printer to Leiden University. In 1625 Isaac brought the printing business of Thomas van Erpe with oriental fonts from his widow for the very large sum of 8000 guilders. With the oriental typography of the Erpenius equipment—including Syrian, Arab, Aramaic and Hebrew fonts—they acquired a monopolistic position in the field of oriental typography. A year later, in 1626, Isaac sold his publishing business to his uncle Bonaventure Elzevir and nephew Abraham Elzevir.

Isaac left Leyden after selling the printing business and purchased a tavern in Rotterdam. In 1629, he abandoned innkeeping to become provost general for the Admiralty of South Holland, Admiralty of de Maze, and Waal. Later, he became a brewer with his two youngest sons. Isaac died in Cologne in 1651 while traveling on business.

== Elzevir Mark ==
The Elzevir mark has been in use since Isaac introduced it in Leyden in 1620. It depicts a vine or a snake entwined Elm tree. A man stands beside the tree which supports a banner bearing the Latin motto Non Solus (not alone).

Images of the Elsevir mark appear at:

- Library of Congress (image at right)
- University of Illinois main library printer's mark
