= Kre M'Baye =

Senegalese painter (1949–2014)

- Born: 25 April 1949; Dakar, Senegal
- Died: 21 October 2014 (aged 65)
- Other names: Amadou Kre M’Baye, Armedy Kre M’Baye
- Citizenship: Senegal
- Occupations: portrait artist, art instructor and actor

Kre M’Baye (25 April 1949 – 21 October 2014), was a Senegalese portrait artist and art instructor. He was also known as Amadou Kre M’Baye, or Armedy Kre M’Baye.

== Life and work ==
He was born Andy Keve in Dakar, Senegal, on April 25, 1949. He was nicknamed “Kere” or “Kre” even as a primary school child because he used to draw constantly on the classroom blackboard with chalk (craie in French). Since 1969 he has been an associate of celebrated African artists such as Ibou Diouf, Mamadou Niang, Seidou Barry, Mor Faye (father of Ousmane Faye) and Art College professor Pierre Lods.

In 1974 he played the head of a gang in the well-received movie Baks (Yamba), produced by Momar Thiam, but abandoned acting in favor of his career as an artist. His first exhibition in 1976 at the Dynamique Museum of Dakar was highly acclaimed, his painting "The Messenger" receiving particular praise by President Léopold Sédar Senghor.

Some of M'Baye's best-known works are his portraits of women inspired by the face of his mother Fari Fate (Mame Fari), “a woman griot and of great renown; a fascinating storyteller of Senegalese history”. Her jewelries, dresses, and hairstyles inspired a painting style in the artist. M'Baye has another style that tends to abstract paintings dominated by blue and orange colors.

M'Baye is a disciple of Pierre Lods and was self-trained in the workshop of Peter Plastics Research Lods. In 1994 Gaston Madeira formed "Netty Guy" (The Three Baobabs), bringing together Kré M'Baye, Moussa N'Diaye Baydie M'Baye and Zulu, three painters representative of the School of Arts in Dakar, who in 1998 opened a gallery on the Senegalese island of N'gor and founded Workshops N'gor. He was a participant in Tenq, the first workshop on the Triangle model (led by El Hadji Sy and sponsored by CBAO, Maersk, SAEC and the British Council, Dakar) held in West Africa, which took place at the Lycée Cheikh Oumar Fontiyou in Saint-Louis, Senegal; the first event of Africa95, a year-long festival celebrating African arts in the UK and Africa, featuring 25 artists from 10 African countries and Great Britain.

M'Baye's brother Seni M’Baye is also a noted Senegalese artist.

== Exhibitions ==
- 1976 First exhibit to the 4th Senegalese painters and visual arts show at the Dynamique Museum of Dakar.
- 1983 New Expressions at Lorient in France
- 1985 French Cultural Center in Dakar
- 1985 IFA Gallery in Bonn, Germany
- 1987 Senegalese painters & visual artists exhibition – received Prize of the Head of State
- 1987 Stadfische Gallery in Wendlinger, Germany
- 1988 American Cultural Center of Dakar at the National Gallery – Kre's Totem du Silence was the only painting selected to be put to auction
- 1990 L’Arche de la Defense in Paris, France
- 1995 Cape Verde Islands – several traveling exhibitions
- 1996 Contemporary Art Exhibition of Dammarie-les-Lys in France – won the City Prize
- 1996 Selected to the Dak’Art 1996 Biennale
- 1998 Mil Arte, 98 Mill Lane (West Hampstead), London, England, April - May
- 1999 Kenkeleba Gallery in New York City, U.S.A.
- Since 1999, Permanent exposition at the Antenna Gallery, Félix Faure street, Dakar
- 2002 Arts Plastiques Exposition: Dakar - Dakart at Aude Minart in Paris, France, April 30 – May 5
- 2005 April 1–14, National Gallery of Art - Sponsored by the American Cultural Center, National Museum of African Art, Washington. Three exhibitions of artists: Souleye Keita, Jacob Yacouba, and Amadou Kré M'Baye
- 2005 St. Mark's Church in-the-Bowery, New York City, U.S. Participated in Plexus International's presentation Erosions and Renaissance, Act IV 12/10/05
- 2006 Senegalese Contemporary Art Exhibit: The Jokko Bar-Expo - 5 Rue Elzévir Paris, France (June – July)
- 2007 Fine Arts Exhibition at Marcel Rozier's gallery in Bois-le-Roi, May 12–20
- 2008 Black Visibility: Contemporary African Art Exhibition March 19 - April 5 at the Conservatoire des Arts, 1, parvis sources 78180 Montigny-le-Bretonneux, Saint-Quentin-en-Yvelines

== Awards ==
- 1987 Prize of the Head of State of Senegal
- 1996 City Prize of Dammarie-les-Lys, France
- 1999 Awarded L'Ordre National du Lion by Abdou Diouf, President of the Republic of Senegal

== Sources ==
- N’Gone’ Fall & Jean Loup Pivin, An Anthology of African Art: The Twentieth Century, D.A.P./Editions Revue Noire, June 2, 1002. ISBN 1-891024-38-8, ISBN 978-1-891024-38-2.
- The Courier: Africa-Caribbean-Pacific-European Union, Commission of the European Communities, 1991 (original from the University of Virginia).
- Elizabeth Harney, "The Ecole de Dakar: Pan-Africanism in Paint and Textile", African Arts, Autumn 2002.
- Jean-Arsène Yao, "El Arte Africano Contemporaneo Existe", Latinamericalandya Website.
- Elizabeth Harney, In Senghor's Shadow: Art, Politics, and the Avant-Garde in Senegal, 1960-1995, Duke University Press, 2004. ISBN 0-8223-3395-3, ISBN 978-0-8223-3395-1.
- La Presse (Tunisia), October 30, 1974.
- Thomas Riggs, St. James Guide to Black Artists, St. James Press, 1997 (original from the University of Michigan). ISBN 1-55862-220-9, ISBN 978-1-55862-220-3.
- Reesa Greenberg, Bruce W. Ferguson & Sandy Naime, Thinking About Exhibitions, Routledge, May 13, 1996. ISBN 0-415-11590-6, ISBN 978-0-415-11590-2.
- Joanna Grabski, "Trajectoires: Art Contemporain du Senegal", African Arts, Spring 2008.
