= Nicolaes Tulp =

Dutch surgeon (1593–1674)

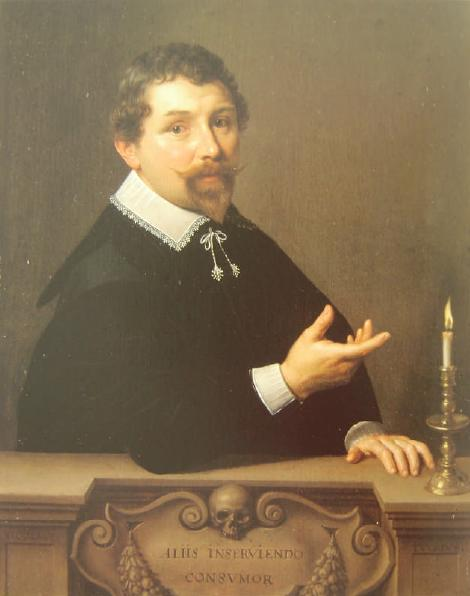
- Nicolaes Tulp by Nicolaes Pickenoy (1633).
- Born: Claes Pieterszoon; 9 October 1593; Amsterdam, Dutch Republic
- Died: 12 September 1674 (aged 80); The Hague, Dutch Republic
- Education: University of Leiden
- Known for: Mayor of Amsterdam, subject of Rembrandt painting
- Scientific career
- Fields: Physician, surgeon, writer, pharmacist, politics
- Workplaces: University of Leiden, Amsterdam Guild of Surgeons

Nicolaes Tulp (9 October 1593 – 12 September 1674) was a Dutch physician and mayor of Amsterdam. Tulp was well known for his upstanding moral character and as the subject of Rembrandt's famous painting The Anatomy Lesson of Dr. Nicolaes Tulp.

== Life ==
Born Claes Pieterszoon, he was the son of a prosperous merchant active in civic affairs in Amsterdam. From 1611 to 1614 he studied medicine in Leiden and returned to Amsterdam where he became a well-respected doctor.

In 1616, Dr. Tulp built a canal house in the Grachtengordel at Keizersgracht 210. Now a private building with apartments, it is located in Amsterdam’s famous de Negen Straatjes (The Little Nine Streets). Both the carved wood around the front door and the iron railings along the front steps have tulips incorporated in the design.

In 1617 he married Aafge van der Voegh. An ambitious young man, he adopted the tulip as his heraldric emblem and changed his name to Nicolaes (a more proper version of the name Claes) Tulp. He began working in local politics as city treasurer, and in 1622, became a magistrate in Amsterdam.

== Career as a physician ==
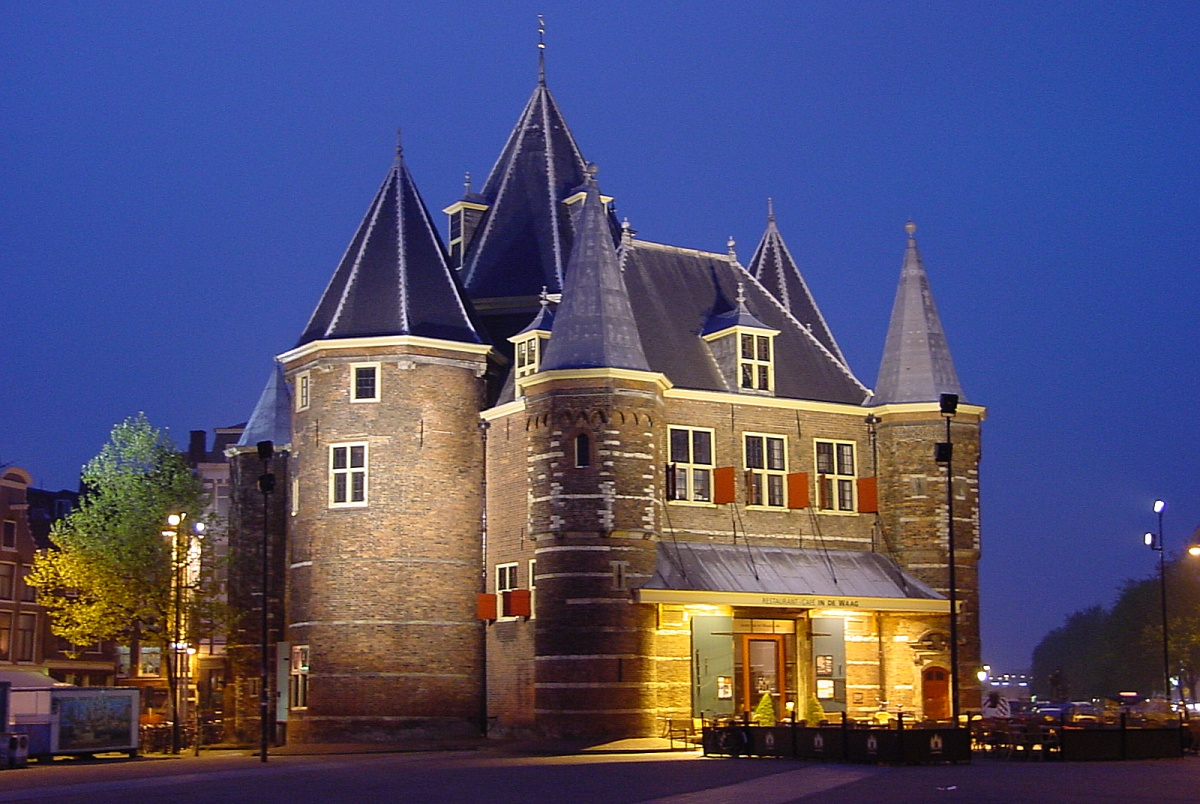
The Amsterdam Waag, originally a city gate, later used as a weigh house and guildhall. Both the Guild of Surgeons and the Amsterdam Guild of Saint Luke met upstairs, where Rembrandt's Anatomy lesson hung for centuries.

The career of Tulp matched the success of Amsterdam. As the population of Amsterdam grew from 30,000 in 1580 to 210,000 in 1650, Tulp's career as a doctor and politician made him a man of influence. He drove a small carriage to visit his patients. Thanks to his connections on the city council, in 1628 Tulp was appointed Praelector Anatomiae at the Amsterdam Guild of Surgeons. His wife died in the same year, leaving him with five young children. In 1630 he married his second wife, the daughter of the mayor of Outshoorn. They had three children.

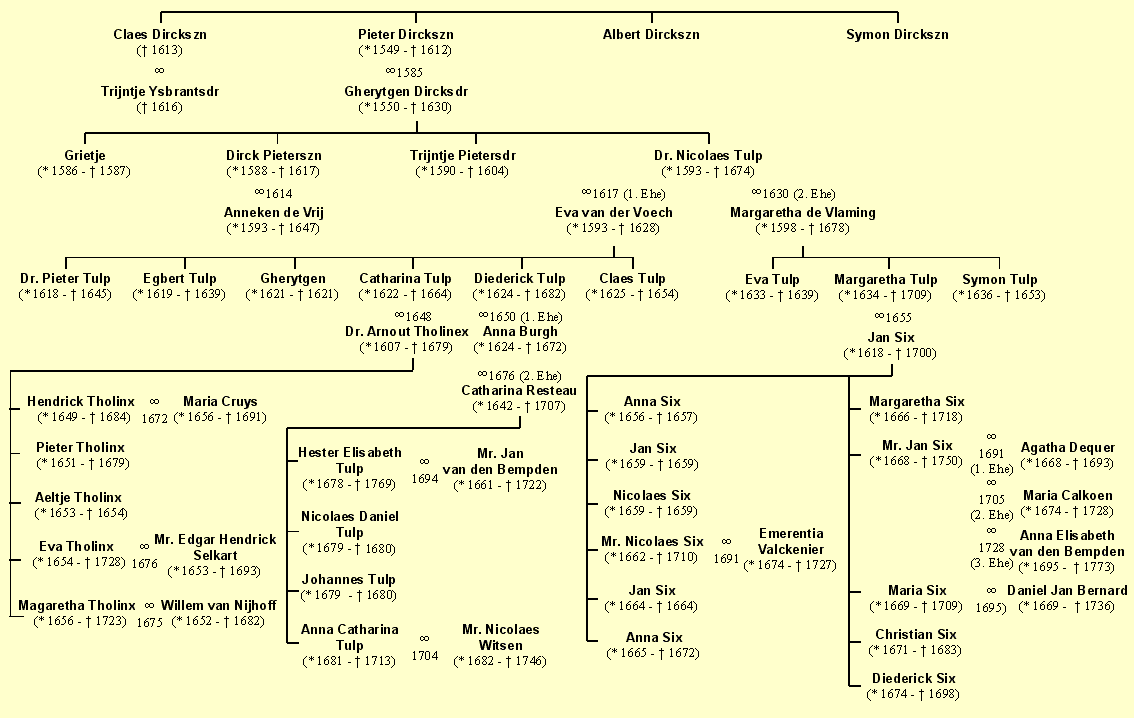
Family tree of Dr. Nicolaes Tulp, showing his illustrious descendants in the famous Amsterdam Six family, as well as the famous cartographer Nicolaes Witsen

It was Tulp who examined and signed the fitness reports for the first Dutch settlers on the island of Manhattan, and his signature was found on these in the long-lost archives of the Dutch settlement uncovered in the 1980s in the basement of the New York public library.

In his position, Tulp was responsible for inspections of apothecary shops. Amsterdam chemists had access to enormous quantities of herbs and spices from the Far East, thanks to newly established shipping routes. The apothecary business flourished – by 1636 there were 66 shops in Amsterdam. Appalled by the exorbitant prices charged for useless medicines against the plague (Amsterdam was severely hit by the plague in 1635), Tulp took action. With his doctor and chemist friends, he wrote the first pharmacopoeia of Amsterdam in 1636, the Pharmacopoea Amstelredamensis. Chemists who wanted to set up shop in Amsterdam were required to pass an exam based on this book. The publication was a groundbreaking work that served as an example for other cities of Holland.

=== Rembrandt's painting ===
The praelector would give yearly anatomy lessons each winter, performing them on victims of public hanging. At that time the dissection of bodies was only legal if the subject was a male criminal and considered outside of the Church. The dissections were performed with the consent of the city council and were a means to collect funds for city council meetings and dinners. All council and guild members were required to attend and pay an admission fee. Throughout Europe, these dissections were attended by prominent learned men, who exchanged ideas about anatomy and the chemical processes of the human body.

As befits a new praelector, the Guild commissioned a new group portrait of the prominent councilmen and guild masters. Rembrandt, himself a young man of 26 and new to the city, won this commission and made a famous painting of him: The Anatomy Lesson of Dr Nicolaes Tulp. This painting, which now hangs in the Mauritshuis museum of the Hague, depicts Tulp dissecting such a criminal's forearm. There has been much speculation as to why the dissection began on the forearm.

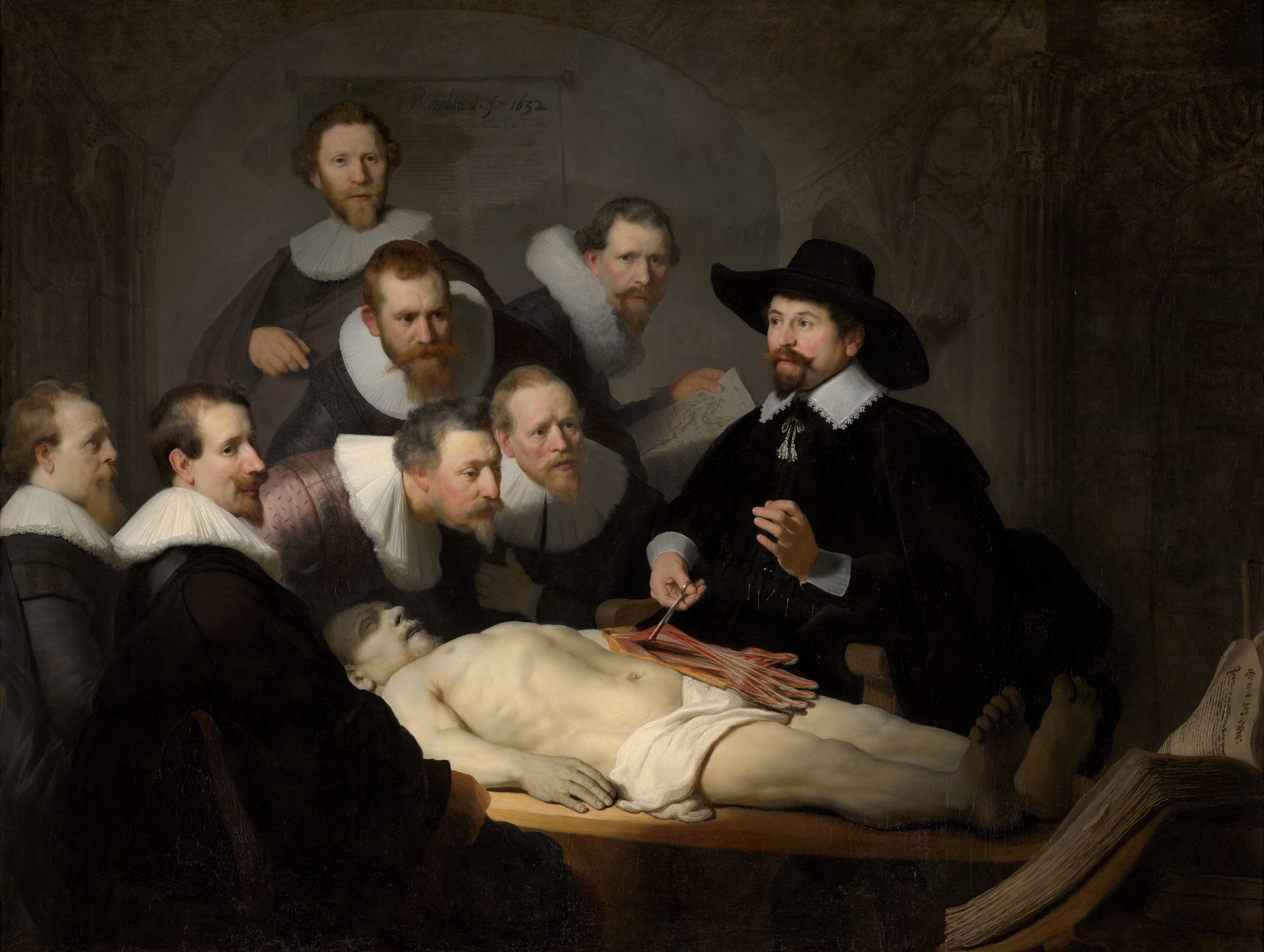
The Anatomy Lesson of Dr Nicolaes Tulp by Rembrandt

Rembrandt's event depicted in the painting can be dated to 16 January 1632; the Amsterdam Guild of Surgeons, of which Tulp was official City Anatomist, permitted only one public dissection a year and the body would have to be that of an executed criminal. The criminal is identified as the robber Aris Kindt. Rembrandt would later make a painting of Tulp's successor in 1656 The Anatomy Lesson of Dr. Jan Deijman. Since the painting of Tulp's predecessor in 1619, The Osteology Lesson of Dr. Sebastiaen Egbertsz was a group portrait around a skeleton, it is clear that the subject of a dead body had set a precedent. It would be another 100 years before the surgeons were allowed to dissect a female cadaver.

=== "Medical observations" ===
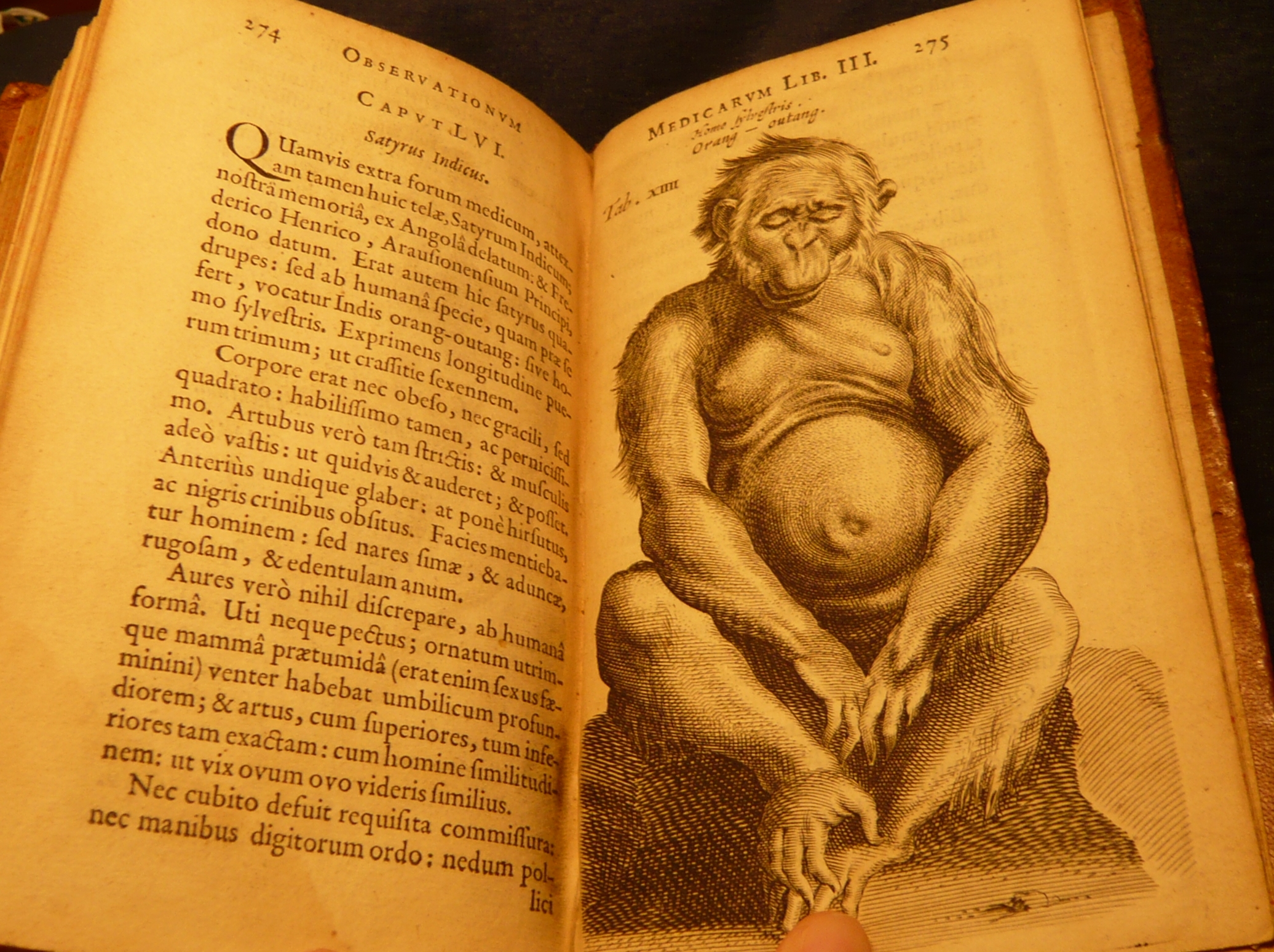
Tulp's illustrated book, showing a page with an orangutan

His most impressive work on medicine was his Observationes Medicae, published in 1641 and again in 1652 by Lodewijk Elzevir. He wrote the first version for his son who had just graduated from Leiden and dedicated the second edition to him after his death. The book comprises minute descriptions of his work, including 231 cases of disease and death. Some called it the "book of monsters" because Tulp dissected animals brought back from the Dutch East India Company's ships, but also because of the fantastic stories that he relates. An example; Jan de Doot, a blacksmith in Amsterdam, was in such pain from a bladder stone, that he sharpened a knife and removed it himself because he refused to be the victim of the 'stone cutters'. These were the barber-surgeons who performed such procedures but had a high death rate. To everyone's surprise, Jan de Doot survived this operation which was said to produce a stone the size of an egg. A painting illustrating this story is in the collection of the Anatomy Museum of Leiden.

Tulp minutely described the condition we know as migraine, the devastating effects of tobacco smoking on the lungs, and reveals an understanding of human psychology in a description of the placebo effect. Tulp also discovered the ileocecal valve at the junction of the large and small intestines, still known as Tulp's valve.

While Tulp made observations of various diseases, treatment often continued in the age-old way. His description of the symptoms of Beriberi in a Dutch seaman, for example, went unnoticed until the cause (vitamin B1 deficiency) was recognized two hundred years later by Christiaan Eijkman.

== Public office ==
Partially as a result of the success of his books, Tulp became Mayor of Amsterdam in 1654, a position he held for four terms. His son Dirck married Anna Burgh, the daughter of Albert Burgh, another Mayor of Amsterdam who had, like Tulp, studied medicine in Leiden in 1614. In 1655 Tulp's daughter Margaretha married Jan Six, whom he helped become a magistrate of family affairs in Amsterdam. Years later, Six would also become Mayor of Amsterdam. Tulp, impressed by his behaviour, invited Paulus Potter to come to Amsterdam, after a quarrel in the Hague.

In 1673 Tulp was admitted to the Governing Committee of the Republic in The Hague.

== Legacy and death ==
Tulp is buried in the New Church of Amsterdam. Joost van den Vondel, a period poet, wrote several verses about him. Besides the famous painting by Rembrandt, there are more paintings, as well as marble and bronze statues of him. The Holstein painter Jurriaen Ovens painted him twice, and also painted his son and daughter. Artus Quellijn also made a portrait.
