= Lodewijk Elzevir =

Belgian printer (1540–1617)

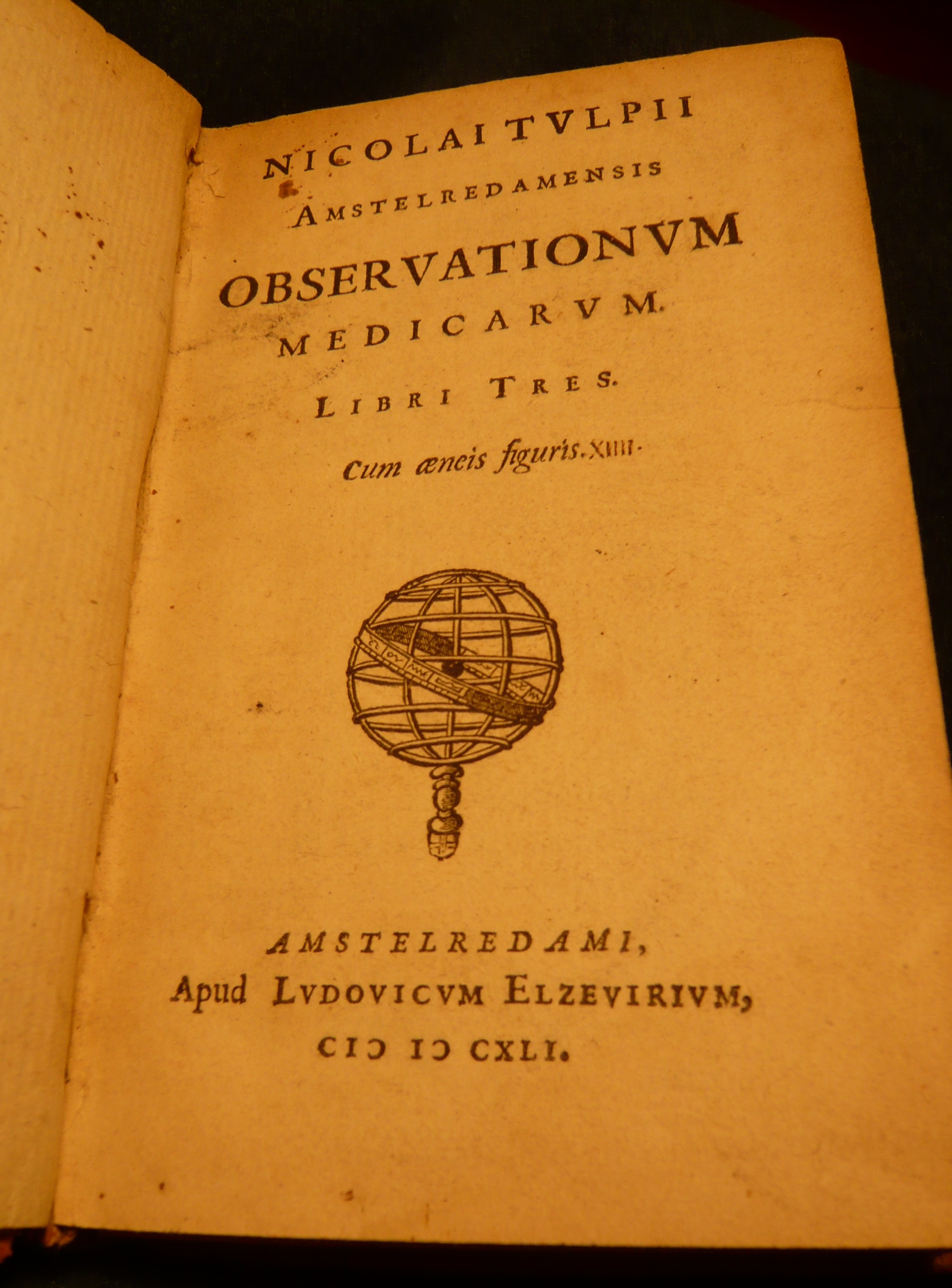
Title page from Prof. Nicolaes Tulp's book called Observacionum Medicarum, published by Ludovicum Elzevirium, 1641

Lodewijk Elzevir (c. 1540 – 4 February 1617), originally Lodewijk or Louis Elsevier or Elzevier, was a printer, born in the city of Leuven (today in Belgium, then part of the Habsburg Netherlands or Spanish Netherlands). He was the founder of the House of Elzevir, which printed works such as "Two New Sciences", written by Galileo, at a time when his work was suppressed for religious reasons. Although the House of Elzevir ceased publishing in 1712, the modern Dutch Elsevier company was founded in 1880 and took its name from the historic Dutch publishing house.

== Biography ==
Elzevir, son of Hans Helschevier, was born in Leuven and started his career as a bookbinder at the printing shop of Christoffel Plantijn in Antwerp. In 1563, he married Maijke de Verdeijen Verbois in Antwerp, where his first two sons were born. He moved to Wesel before 1570, to Douai (before 1575), and settled in Leiden before 1580.

He produced his first book at Leiden in 1583, and the business continued until 1791 under his descendants. The printing house was instrumental in the publication of important work in science. Atypical of other printers of the era, Elzevir books focused on sturdiness rather than elegance and legibility over ornate characters. His books were usually smaller with narrow margins. Christopher van Dyck was one of the type designers. Most of the work was published in Latin.

His oldest son, Matthijs, his sixth son, Bonaventure Elzevir, and his grandsons, Abraham and Isaac Elzevir, continued and expanded the business. The Lodowijk Elzevir who famously met Galileo in Arcetri in 1636 was the grandson of this Lodwijk (1604–1670).

== Literature ==
Literature in archives and libraries and online on archive.org:

- Hartman de Custer, Handschriftenverzameling Rotterdam 13, Collectie 33-01 (Stadsarchief Rotterdam, 1760, 346p)
- Jean-Félicissime Adry, Notice sur les imprimeurs de la famille des Elzévirs (Delance, Paris, 1806, 60p)
- Charles Pieters, Genealogie de la famille Elsevier, Annex de: Analyse des matériaux les plus utiles, pour des futures annales de l’imprimerie des Elsevier (C. Annoot-Braeckman, Gand, 1843, 76p)
- W.J.C. Rammelman Elsevier, Uitkomsten van een onderzoek omtrent de Elseviers, meer bepaaldelijk met opzigt tot derzelver genealogie (N. van der Monde, Utrecht, 1845, 100p)
- Auguste Joseph de Reume, Recherches historiques, généalogiques et bibliographiques sur les Elsevier, (Ad. Wahlen et compagnie, Bruxelles, 1847, 124p)
- Charles Pieters, Annales de l'Imprimerie Elsevirienne et histoire de la famille des Elsevier et de ses editions, (C. Annoot-Braeckman, Gand, 1851, 468p)
- Charles Pieters, Annales de l'Imprimerie des Elsevier ou histoire de leur famille et de leurs éditions. Seconde édition, revue et augmentée, (C. Annoot-Braeckman, Gand, 1858, 575p)
- Alphonse Willems, Les Elzevier histoire et annales typographiques, (G.A. van Trigt, Bruxelles, Adolphe Labitte, Paris, Martinus Nijhoff, La Haye, 1880, 865p)
- Pieter Haverkorn van Rijsewijk, ‘‘Bijdrage tot de Geschiedenis der Elseviers’‘ (Oud Holland, Jg. XIV, 1896, 33p)
- Alfons Willems, ‘‘Lodewijk Elzevier's geboortejaar’‘ (Tijdschrift voor boek- en bibliotheekwezen, Jg. VI, 1908, 3p)
- Enschedé, J.W. 1908. "De Elseviers en de beteekenis van hun uitgaven" (Elsevier’s Geïllustreerd Maandschrift, Jg. XVIII), part 1 and part 2

Literature in libraries and for sale online:

- David W. Davies, The World of the Elseviers 1580-1712, (Martinus Nijhoff, The Hague, 1954, 168p)
- S.L. Hartz, The Elseviers and their Contemporaries, (Elsevier, Amsterdam-Brussels, 1955, 107p)
- Paul Hoftijzer e.a. (red.), Boekverkopers van Europa - Het 17de-eeuwse Nederlandse uitgevershuis Elzevier, (Walburg pers, Zutphen, 2000, 352p)

Literature in libraries:

- A.M. Bosters, Enige genealogische gegevens over het West-Brabantse geslacht Elsevier (A.M. Bosters. Voorburg, 2000, 5p)
- C.E.G. ten Houte de Lange, Stockmans, Stokmans, Elsevier Stokmans, Elzevier Stokmans (Megen) (NIGHO, Zeist, 2006, 48p)
