= House of Elzevir =

17th and 18th century Dutch booksellers

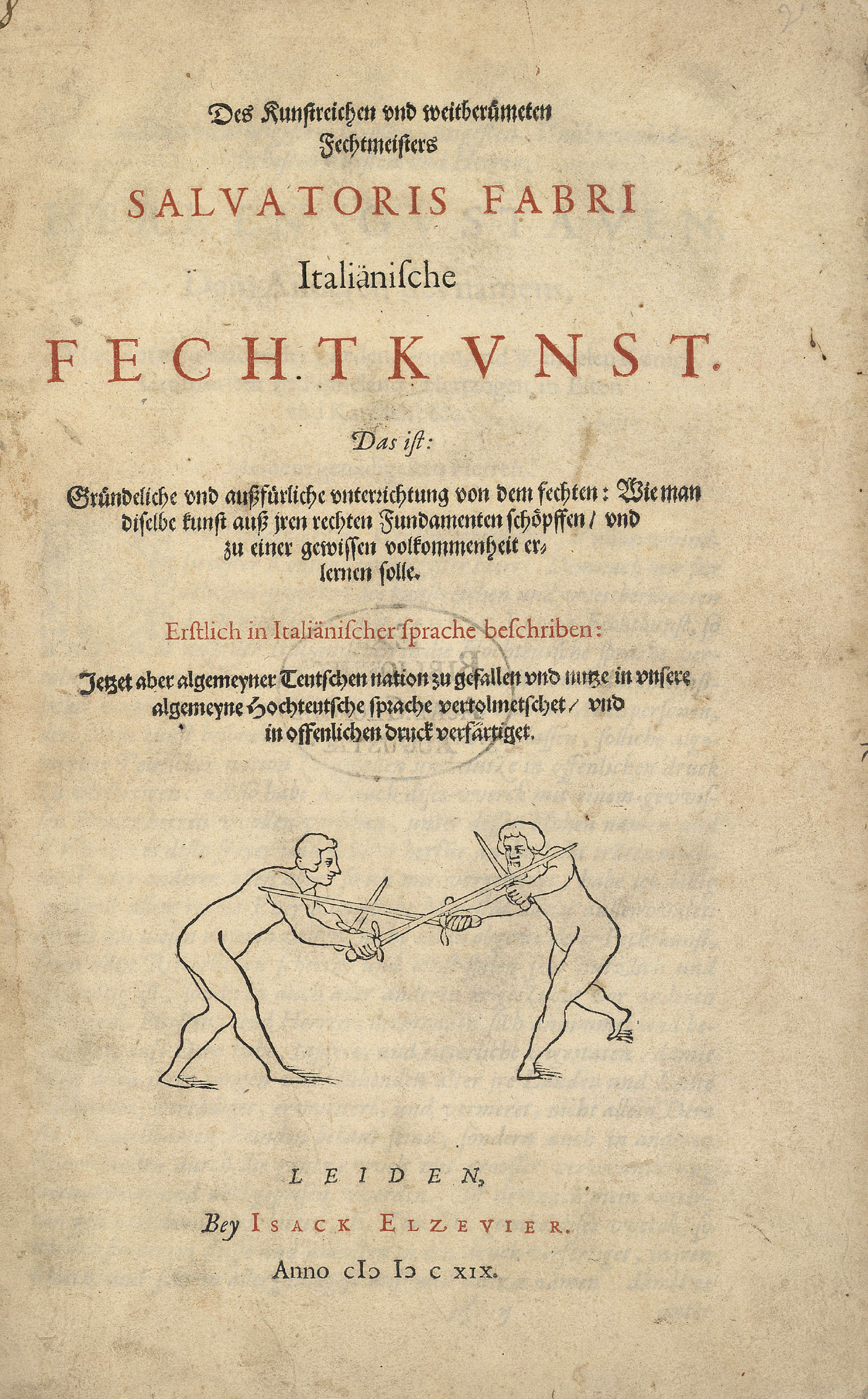
German-language book about fencing published in Leiden by Isaac Elzevier in 1619

Elzevir is the name of a family of Dutch booksellers, publishers, and printers of the 17th and early 18th centuries. The duodecimo series of "Elzevirs" became very famous and very desirable among bibliophiles, who sought to obtain the tallest and freshest copies of these tiny books.

Although it appears the family was involved with the book trade as early as the 16th century, it is only known for its work in some detail beginning with Lodewijk Elzevir (also called Louis). The family ceased printing in 1712, but a contemporary publisher, Elsevier (founded in 1880), took over, for marketing purposes, the name and logo of this early modern business, but without having any real historical connections to it.

== History ==
=== Early history ===
In an age of non-standardized spelling, the name of the family was most often spelled Elsevier, or Elzevier, and their French editions mostly retain this name; but the name was gradually corrupted in English into Elzevir as a generic term for their books. The family originally came from Leuven, where Louis was born circa 1546. Although he worked in the book trade throughout his life, Louis seems to have worked mostly as a bookbinder in his early decades. He relocated with his family several times, including a stint in Antwerp, and in 1565 his name can be found on the payroll of the great printer-publisher Plantin. In 1580, he made a final move to Leiden, where he seems to have worked first as a bookbinder, and later as a bookseller and publisher.

An edition of Eutropius, which appeared in 1592, was long regarded as the earliest Elzevir publication, but the first is now known to be Drusii Ebraicarum quaestionum ac responsionum libri duo, which was produced in 1583. In all Louis published about 150 works. He died on 4 February 1617. Of his seven sons, five, Matthieu/Matthijs, Louis, Gilles, Joost and Bonaventura, adopted their father's profession. Among them, Bonaventura Elzevir (1583–1652) is the most celebrated. He began business as a publisher in 1608, and in 1626 took into partnership Abraham Elzevir, his nephew by Matthijs, born at Leiden in 1592. In 1617 Isaac Elzevir (1596–1651), Matthijs' second son, was the first in the family to acquire printing equipment, which then passed into the hands of the partnership of Bonaventura and Abraham in 1626 when he decided to exit the business. Abraham died on 14 August 1652, and Bonaventura about a month afterwards.

=== Later history ===
The fame of the Elzevir editions rests chiefly on the works issued by the firm of Bonaventura and Abraham. Their Greek and Hebrew impressions are considered inferior to those of the Aldines and the Estiennes, but their small editions in 12mo, 16mo and 24mo, for elegance of design, neatness, clearness and regularity of type, and beauty of paper, cannot be surpassed. Special mention ought to be made of their two editions of the New Testament in Greek, published in 1624 and 1633, of which the latter is the more beautiful and the more sought; the Psalterium Davidis, 1653; Virgilii opera, 1636; Terentii comediae, 1635; but the works that gave their press its chief celebrity are their collection of French authors on history and politics in 24mo, known under the name of the Petites Républiques, and their series of Latin, French and Italian classics in small 12mo. Also, they are noted for their publication in 1638 of Galileo's last work, the Two New Sciences, at a time when the Roman Inquisition forbade the latter's writings.

Between 1626 and 1649, Bonaventure and Abraham Elzevir published a bestselling series titled the Respublicae (commonly known as the Republics or Petites Républiques), the ancestor of the modern travel guide. Each of the thirty-five volumes in the series gave information on the geography, inhabitants, economy, and history of a country in Europe, Asia, Africa, or the Near East.

Jean, son of Abraham, born in 1622, had since 1647 been in partnership with his father and uncle at Leiden, and when they died Daniel, son of Bonaventure, born in 1626, joined him. Their partnership did not last more than two years, and after its dissolution Jean carried on the business alone until his death in 1661. In 1654 Daniel joined his cousin Louis (the third of that name and son of the second Louis), who was born in 1604, and had established a printing press at Amsterdam in 1638.

From 1655 to 1666 they published a series of Latin classics in 8vo, cum notis variorum; Cicero in 4to; the Etymologicon linguae Latinae; and in 1663 a magnificent Corpus Juris Civilis in folio in two volumes. Louis died in 1670, and Daniel in 1680. Besides Bonaventure, another son of Matthieu, Isaac, born in 1593, established a printing press at Leiden, where he carried on business to 1625; but none of his editions attained much fame. The last representatives of the Elzevir printers were Peter, grandson of Joost, who from 1667 to 1675 was a bookseller at Utrecht, and printed seven or eight volumes of little consequence; and Abraham, son of the first Abraham, who from 1681 to 1712 was university printer at Leiden.

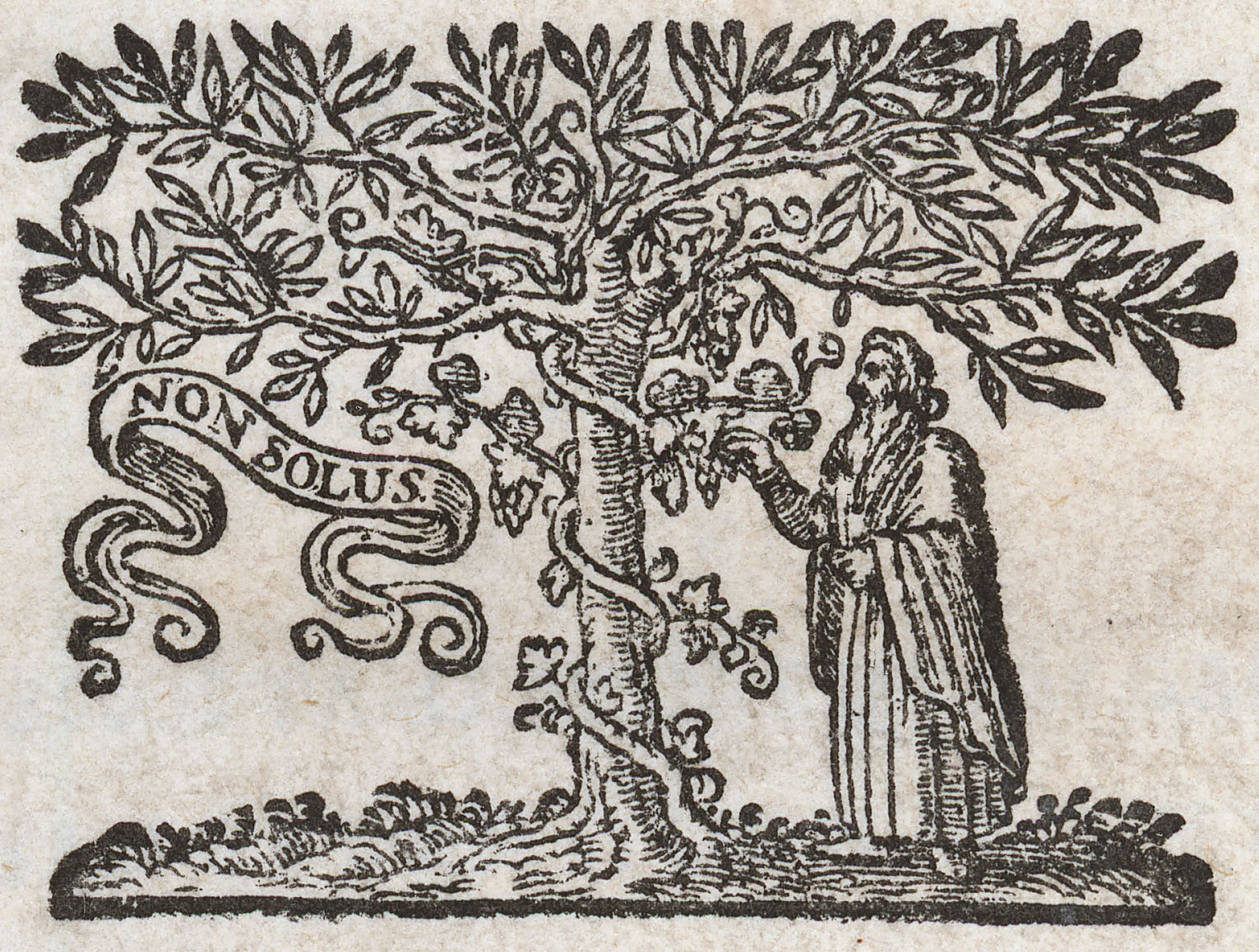
The famous Elsevier tree printer's mark, in a 1653 book. The modern Elsevier logo is based on this design.

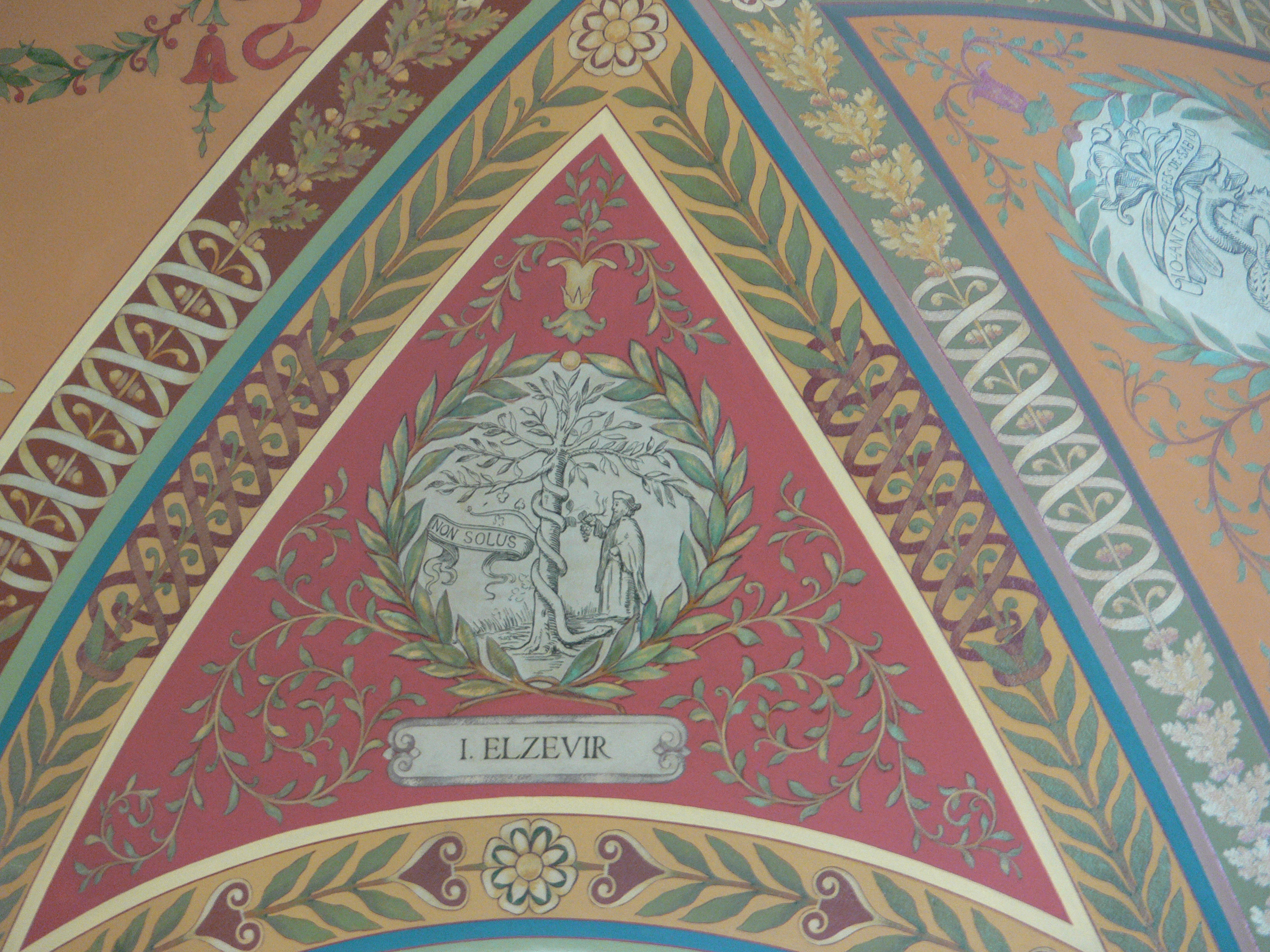
Elsevir printer mark depicted in the Library of Congress

Some of the Elzevir editions bear no other typographical mark than simply the words Apud Elzevirios, or Ex officina Elseviriana, under the rubrique of the town. But most bear one of their special devices, four of which are known to have been in common use. Louis Elzevir, the founder of the family, usually adopted the arms of the United Provinces, but with the lion swapped for an eagle on a cippus holding in its claws a sheaf of seven arrows, adorned with the motto Concordia res parvae crescunt. About 1620 the Leiden Elzevirs adopted a new device, known as le Solitaire, or the Hermit, and consisting of an elm tree, a fruitful vine and a man alone, with a motto Non solus (not alone). They also used another device, a palm tree with the motto, Assurgo pressa. The Elzevirs of Amsterdam used for their principal device a figure of Minerva with owl, shield and olive tree, and the motto, Ne extra oleas. The earliest productions of the Elzevir press are marked with an angel bearing a hook and a scythe, and various other devices occur at different times. When the Elzevirs did not wish to put their name to their works they generally marked them with a sphere, but of course the mere fact that a work printed in the 17th century bears this mark is no proof that it is theirs. The total number of works of all kinds which came from the presses of the Elzevirs is given by Willems as 1608; there were also many forgeries. Hitherto unrecorded Elzevir imprints can still be discovered.

== See also ==
- Books in the Netherlands
- Pierre Marteau is a pseudonym invented by Jean Elzevir to avoid the censorship of the time.
