= Observationes Medicae (Tulp) =

1641 book by Nicolaes Tulp

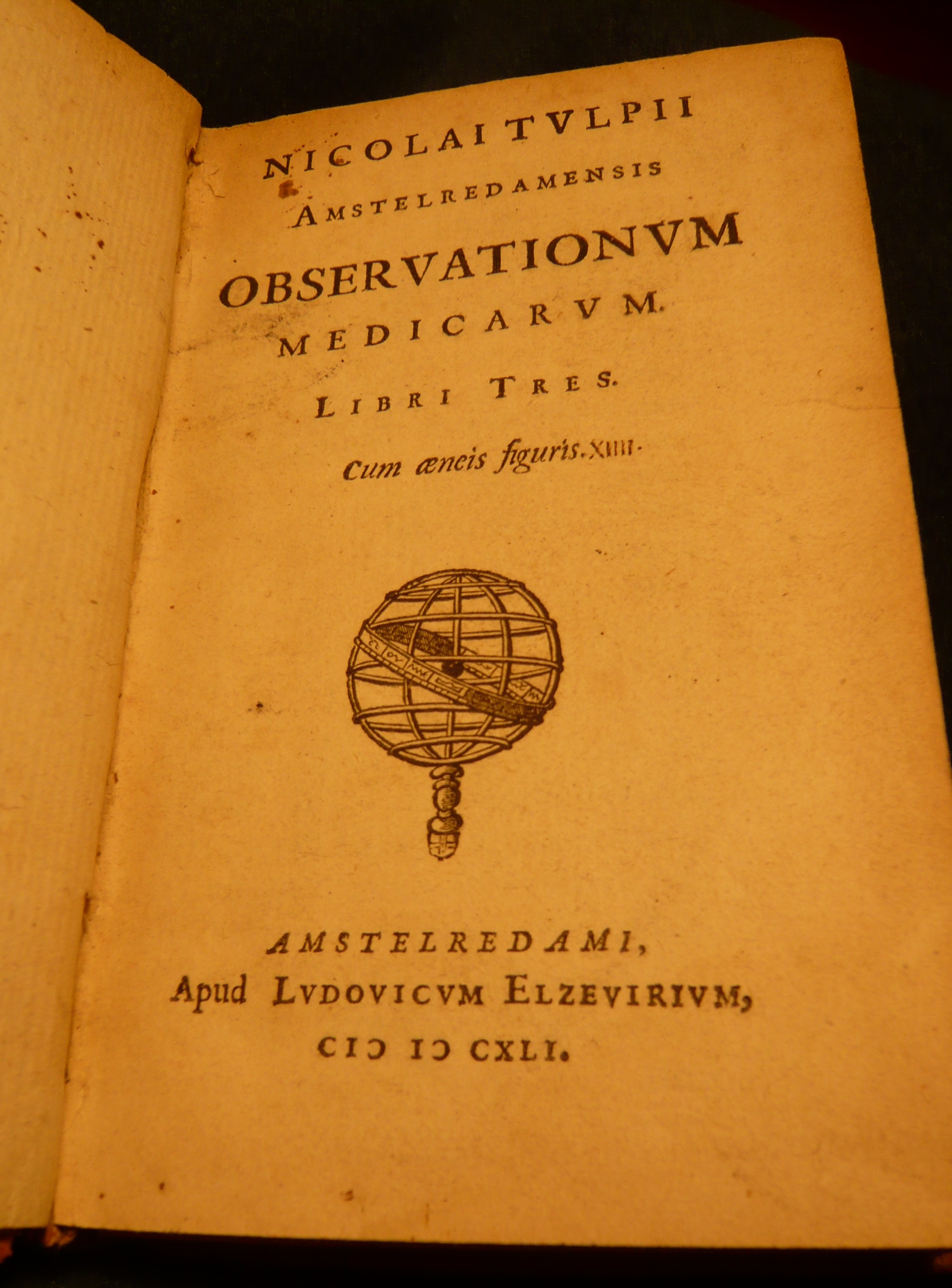
Title page from Prof. Tulp's 1641 book, published by Lodewijk Elzevir.

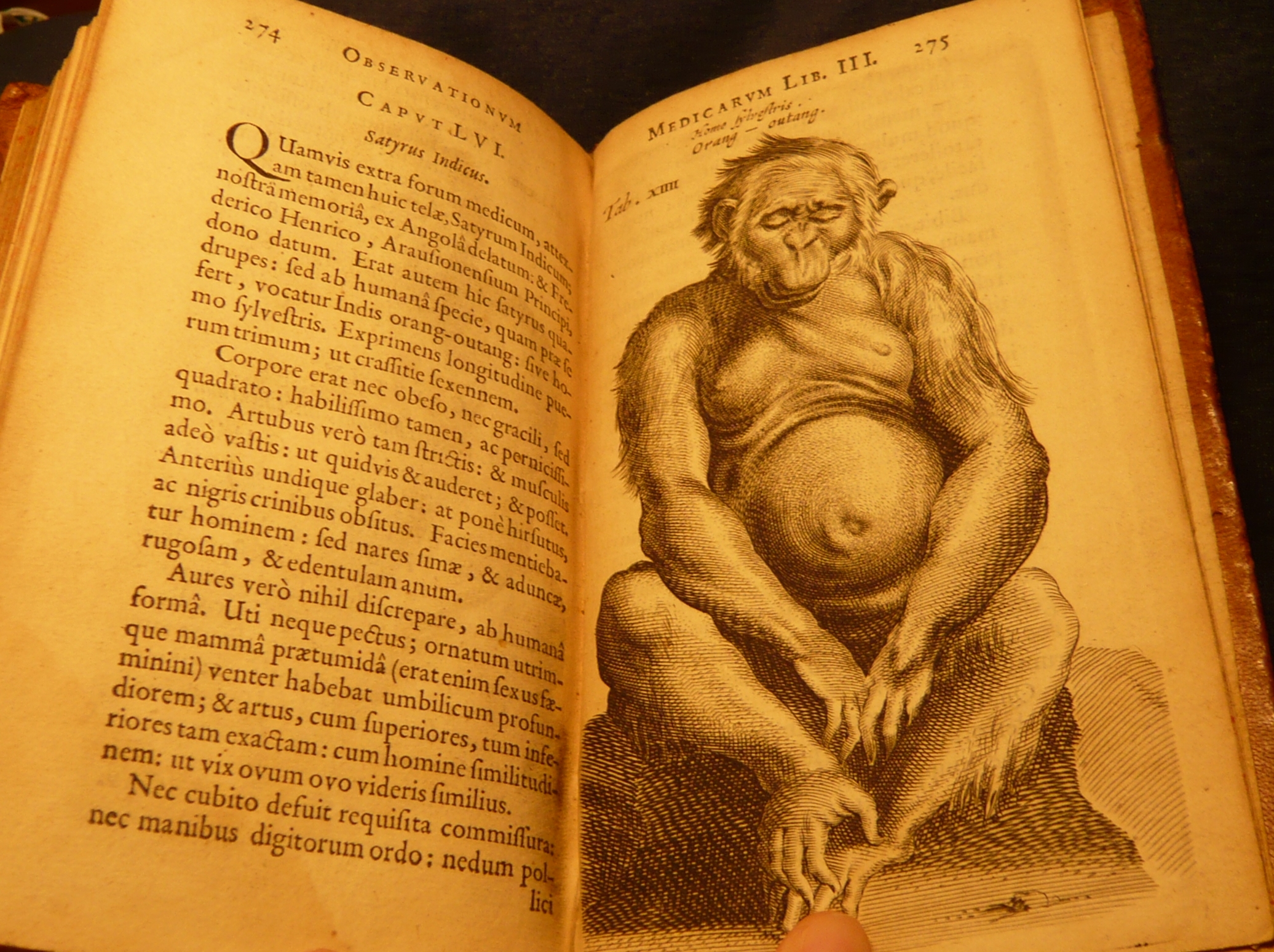
Page from Prof. Tulp's book with possibly the first published illustration of a chimpanzee.

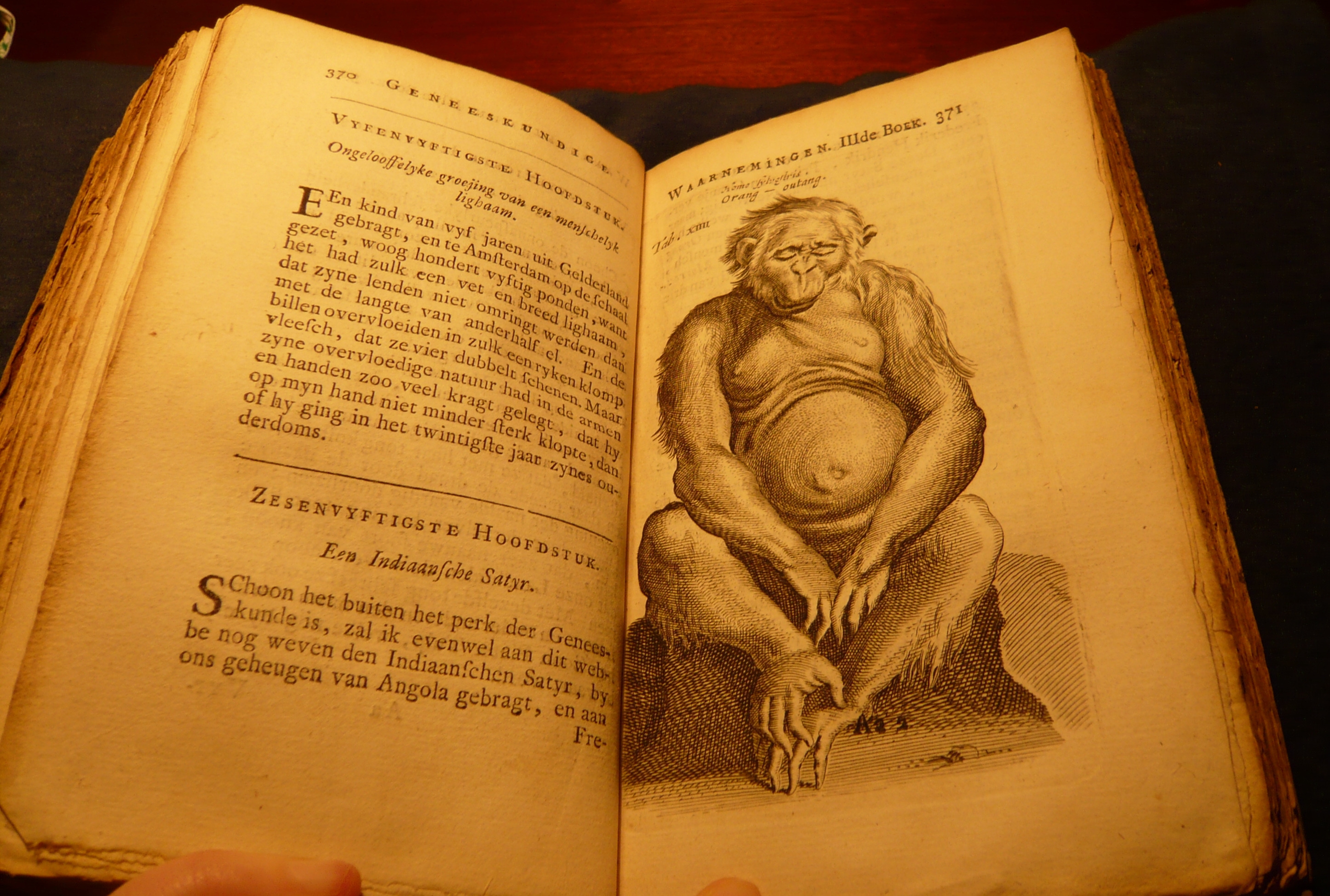
Same page from 1740 Wolzogen edition.

Observationes Medicae is a 1641 book by Nicolaes Tulp. Tulp is primarily famous today for his central role in the 1632 group portrait by Rembrandt of the Amsterdam Guild of Surgeons, which commemorates his appointment as praelector in 1628.

"Observationes Medicae" is also the title commonly used by early Dutch doctors in the 16th and 17th centuries who wrote up their cases from private practise in Latin to share with contemporary colleagues.

== Professor Tulp ==
Though already well known at the time his book was written, Professor Tulp enjoyed international fame after publishing this book, and in 1652 a second edition was printed, highly unusual at that time. His book comprises 164 cases from his practise, kept in a diary from his early career onwards. His book was illustrated with plates, and it is not clear who drew these or engraved them. According to various sources, he drew many of these himself. His birth name was Claes Pietersz. He adopted the name Tulp when he had a Tulip shaped sign placed outside his door when he set up shop in Amsterdam. Many of his early patients could not read or write. He soon no longer needed to advertise his services, however, and his many duties as Praelector, and later, mayor of the city of Amsterdam, prevented him from spending so much time on his practise. He published the book 5 years after the Amsterdam Pharmacopoeia was completed, which was his own personal initiative, and that helped to set intercity medical standards in the region known as the United Provinces.

== Vondel ==
Tulp had a reputation for a moral upstanding character, and Joost van den Vondel wrote poetry extolling his virtue. He later also wrote a poem in honor of the second edition of this book.

== Earliest illustration of a chimpanzee ==
The book contains, in addition to reviews and illustrations of unusual diseases, the first depiction of an ape-like creature. It is a female specimen, brought by a ship of the Dutch East India Company and housed in the menagerie of Prince Frederick Hendrick of Orange in The Hague. Although Tulp calls it Satyrus Indicus, based on classical texts such as Pliny the Elder and Aelianus, and, in the "native language," as he states, Orang Outang, meaning Orangutan, it is more likely a chimpanzee, since the text indicates that it comes from Angola. Besides its physical description, illustrated by the author himself, the text outlines its habits and customs, alternating his observations with accounts from ancient authors and travelers' tales. This drawing was copied many times and formed the basis for many theories on the origin of man. Most notably, Tulp's work and that of Jacob de Bondt (alias Jacobus Bontius) was copied and republished by Linnaeus to show a link between apes and man.

== Jan de Doot ==
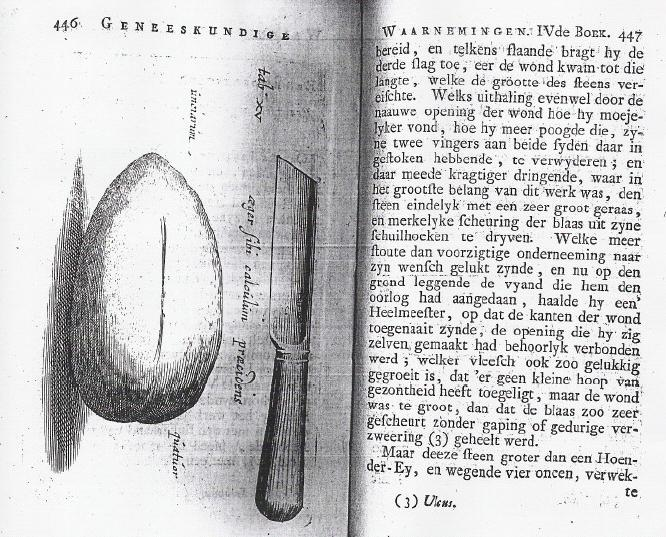
Story from Prof. Tulp's book with illustration of the knife and kidney stone (publication 1740)

One of the interesting cases is the story of how Jan de Doot performed a bladder operation on himself.

But this stone weighing 4 ounces and the size of a hen's egg was a wonder how it came out with the help of one hand, without the proper tools, and then from the patient himself, whose greatest help was courage and impatience embedded in a truly impenetrable faith which caused a brave deed as none other. So was he no less than those whose deeds are related in the old scriptures. Sometimes daring helps when reason doesn't.

== Ludovicus Wolzogen ==
Observationes Medicae became so popular, that a hundred years later a translated version was published. Professor Tulp never wanted to publish in Dutch for fear of hypochondriac behavior. He was very against quacks and self-medication and it was for this reason that he worked on the Amsterdam Pharmacopoeia. This second version therefore, would have been against his wishes. However, the book was prefaced by a long lykoratie, or ode to his memory, in which Ludovicus Wolzogen explains what a wonderful man Tulp was, and everything that he did for the city of Amsterdam and medicine in general. He claims to have made an accurate translation from the Latin, but the flowery language is so different from Tulp's terse descriptions, that this is highly unlikely. After this edition, the number of cases went up from 164 to 251,

== Index Capitvm Libri I ==
The chapters and accompanying plates of the 1641 and 1740 editions of Book one are the same, only four extra chapters appear in the later version.

- 1 Calvaria fracta.
- 2 Occulta capitis rima
- 3 Fractura ossis cuneiformis
- 4 Fractura capitis sanata
- 5 Salutaris modioli usus.
- 6 Morbus attonitus
- 7 Morbus attonitus a sanguine
- 8 Morbus comitialis sponte sanatus
- 9 Morbus comitialis a splene
- 10 Morbus comitialis a vulva
- 11 Epilepsia fexies cottidie accedens
- 12 Tremor periodicus
- 13 Reciprocus capitis dolor
- 14 Convulvsio sedentaria
- 15 Praesagium convulsionis periodicae
- 16 Viti saltus
- 17 Malleatio
- 18 Imaginaria ossium mollities
- 19 Mola imaginaria
- 20 Aquaemetus
- 21 Senexrabiosus
- 22 Catalepsis ex amore
- 23 Pollicis tremor, a detractione sanguinis
- 24 Hydrocephalus
- 25 Hydrocephalus dimidiati capitis
- 26 Polypus narium
- 27 Polypus cordis
- 28 Oculiprocidentia
- 29 Encanthiscancrosa
- 30 Vulnus pupillae sanatum
- 31 Caecitas a veneno
- 32 Dolor capitis a natura devictus
- 33 Dolor inter caput, ac pedem reciprocus
- 34 Pedes talpini
- 35 Respiratio per aures
- 36 Mors a dente genuino
- 37 Ulera palati
- 38 Prolapsus palati
- 39 Vox a febre intercepta
- 40 Idem silentium a pituita
- 41 Mutus loquens
- 42 Gula resoluta
- 43 Inedia undecim dierum
- 44 Lethalis gula tumor
- 45 Idem tumor a pituita
- 46 Strumarum anatome
- 47 Cancer quinquaginta annos innoxius
- 48 Arteriotomia
- 49 Sanguis ex dente
- 50 Vulnus aspera arteriae
- 51 Angina interna
- 52 Ranula
- 53 Cancer mammarum
- 54 Evanidae mammarum pustulae
- 55 Livor ex tusst

== Index Capitvm Lib. II ==
The chapters and accompanying plates of the 1641 and 1740 editions of Book two are the same, only one extra chapter appears in the later version.

- 1 Dolor pleuriticus e bile
- 2 Sanguis octies puerperaemissus
- 3 Pleuritis sanguinem venis subtrahens
- 4 Pleuritis suppurata
- 5 Legitima thoracis sectio
- 6 Pus thoracis per umbilicum
- 7 Rara difficilis spiritus caussa
- 8 Marcor ostreis sanatus
- 9 Idem successus a sola natura
- 10 Vomica pulmonis
- 11 Sputum sanguinis triginta annorum
- 12 Surculus, venae arteriosae, expectoratus
- 13 Integra vena a pulmone rejecta
- 14 Frustum pulmonis, fauces occludens
- 15 Turunda ore rejecta
- 16 Hydrops thoracis
- 17 Pulmp praecisus
- 18 Vulnus cordis
- 19 Cordis palpitatio a Liene
- 20 Ira puerperis noxia
- 21 Vomitus bilis atrae
- 22 Vomitus octodecim mensium
- 23 Vomitus pituitae concretae
- 24 Praegnans edensmille quadringentos haleces
- 25 Calculus arterialis
- 26 Fibrae jocinoris vulneratae
- 27 Pus Iocinoris, peros, ac alvum
- 28 Lien verberans
- 29 Lien disruptus
- 30 Magnus lien
- 31 Sanguis cutem transudans
- 32 Steatoma mesenterii
- 33 Steatoma cum ulcere, & aqua
- 34 Hydrops cum vesiculis mesenterii
- 35 Tympanites cum ascite
- 36 Morbus regius, cum hydrope
- 37 Abscessus mesenterii, a partu disruptus
- 38 Ventrissectio
- 39 Perforatio scroti
- 40 Mors ex depresso ventre
- 41 Volvulus ex ira
- 42 Caput lumbrici lati
- 43 Ischuria lunatica
- 44 Calculus renum
- 45 Calculus ureterem obturans
- 46 Diabetes
- 47 Mictus lapidosus
- 48 Membrana lapidescens
- 49 Mictus vermis cruenti
- 50 Unde viginti vermiculi emicti
- 51 Cottidianus vermium mictus
- 52 Periodicus capillorum mictus
- 53 Ulcus vesicae sanatum

== Index Capitvm Lib. III ==
The chapters and accompanying plates of the 1641 and 1740 editions of Book three are the same, the Indisch Satyr is also the last plate in the later version.

- 1 Misera, virginis gibbosa, conditio
- 2 Vesica a calculo consumpta
- 3 Gangraena umbilici
- 4 Lapides bezoarticiin homine
- 5 Calculus vesica adnatus
- 6 Calculus vesica arcte circumdatus
- 7 Calculus trium unciarum sponte excretus
- 8 Modus eximendi calculum ex urethra
- 9 Turunda lapidescens
- 10 Lethalis ani tumor
- 11 Dolor ani quarta hora a solut an alyo
- 12 Lumbricus ex inguine
- 13 Periculosa hernia sanata
- 14 Sapientia juvenilis
- 15 Praeposterum silentium
- 16 Immoderatus clysteris usus
- 17 Interior intestini tunica excreta
- 18 Adepscottidie ab alvo prodiens
- 19 Idem adeps, ab alvo, ac vesica
- 20 Vulnus, latioris intestini sanatum
- 21 Valvula intestinalis
- 22 Convulsio abdominis
- 23 Abscessus inguinum, a vulva
- 24 Tabes dorsalis
- 25 Coxa dolor adscessu fanatus
- 26 Coxa ferramento exusta
- 27 Vulnus spinalis medullae
- 28 Fistula insanabilis
- 29 Lethalis lumborem tumor
- 30 Spina dorsibifida
- 31 Vulva bili innatans
- 32 Hydrops uteri
- 33 Fungus ex vulva excifus
- 34 Major fungus ibidem excifus
- 35 Terus sive fricatrix
- 36 Menstrua puellae quadrimae
- 37 Partus monstri bicipitis
- 38 Dissectio monstribicipitis
- 39 Coles incurvatus
- 40 Pediculi pubis
- 41 Mors ex flore calcis
- 42 Sudor septem annorum
- 43 Excoriatio ab oleo Vitrioli
- 44 Exedenspraecordiorum herpes
- 45 Pulfus arteriae extracarpum, explorandus
- 46 Gangraena universalis
- 47 Gangraena pedis
- 48 Sphacelus brachii, a febre
- 49 Atrophia brachii suctu sanata
- 50 Rotundum vulnus
- 51 Carcinoma fremoris
- 52 Febris quintana
- 53 Cibi abstinentia quartanae lethalis
- 54 Error naturae compensatus
- 55 Incredibile corporis humani incrementum
- 56 Indisch Satyr

== Index Capitvm Lib. IV ==
There is no Book four in the original version, but the later version calls it Register der Hoofdstukken van het vierde boek. The sixty chapters and accompanying plates are some of the most popular in Dutch medical literature, however, including the Jan de Doot (or Jan Lethaus, a bastardized version of the Latin for lethal - lethalis), ending with a chapter on Tea.
