= Carel van Savoyen =

Dutch painter (1620/21–1665)

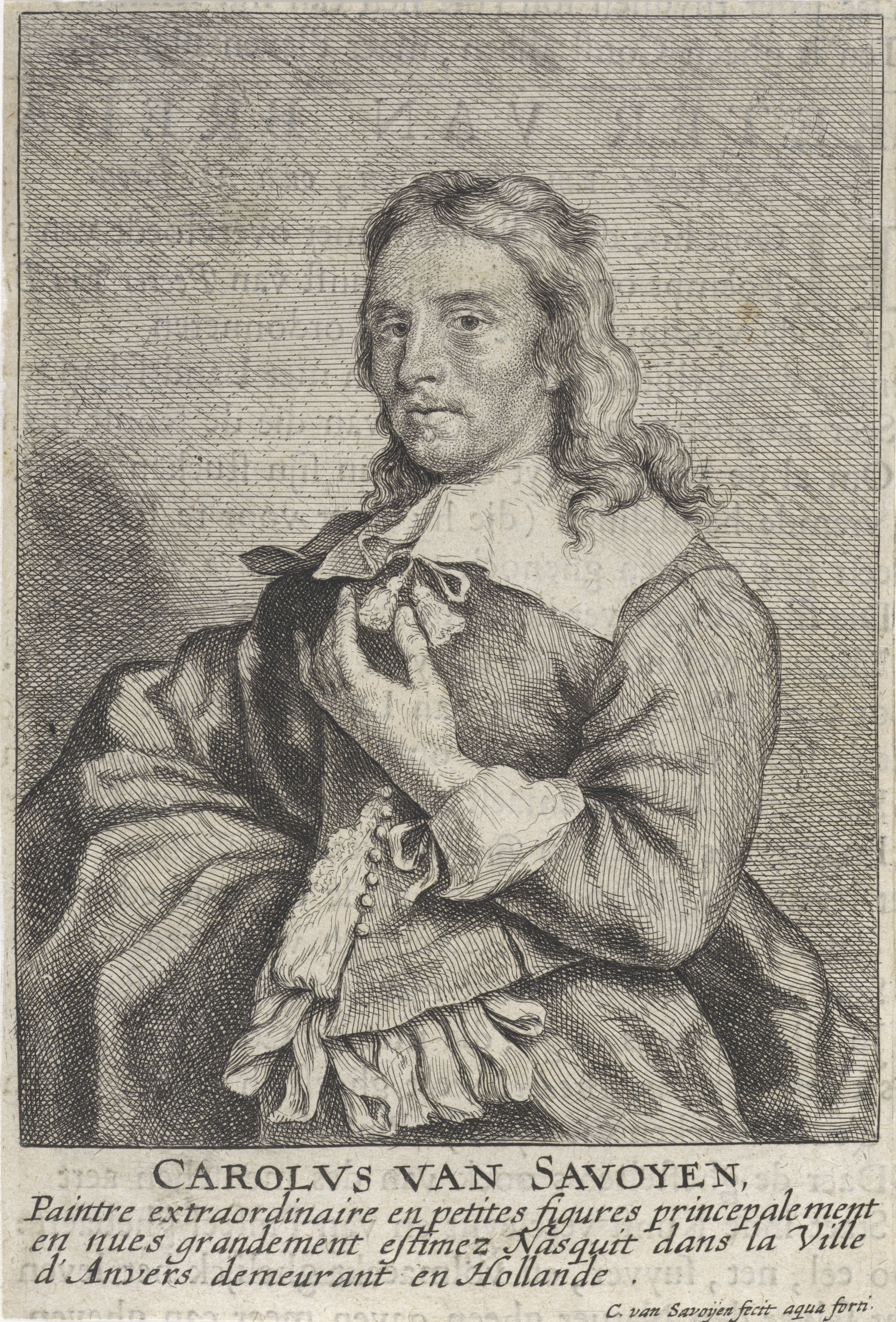
- Self-portrait
- Born: 1620-21, Antwerp
- Died: 24 January 1665, Amsterdam
- Known for: Painting, engraving

Carel van Savoyen or Carel van Savoy (1620/21–1665) was a Flemish painter, draughtsman and printmaker who was active in Antwerp and Amsterdam. He is mainly known for his history paintings and portraits but he also painted allegories and genre scenes.

== Life ==
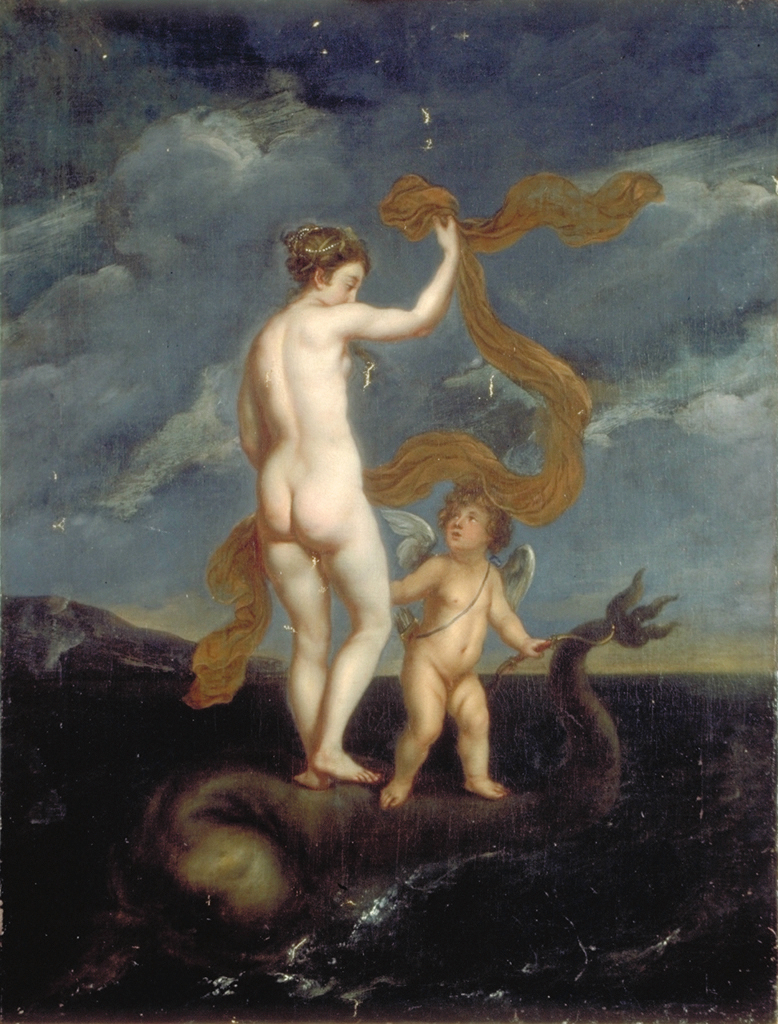
Venus and Adonis on a dolphin

The artist was born in Antwerp. He was the older brother of Philips van Savoy (or 'Philips van Savoyen') who was also a painter and later was active in Amsterdam. He was registered in the Antwerp Guild of Saint Luke as a pupil of the history and portrait painter Jan Cossiers in 1634–35. He left for Italy where he stayed in Rome in the period from 1643 to 1645.

The artist was recorded in Amsterdam on 20 April 1649 when he married Catharina Wandelman, the daughter of a wealthy Catholic merchant in Amsterdam. He stated at the time that he was 28 years of age. He became citizen (poorter) of Amsterdam on 1 September 1649.

He is known to have worked on two large paintings, both dated 1659, for churches in the Northern Netherlands. That Carel van Savoyen received the commission for these two altarpieces may have had something to do with the connections of his wife's wealthy Catholic family, which made him the brother-in-law of an Amsterdam priest. The prestige of Flemish art with the Amsterdam elite of the day may also have played a role.

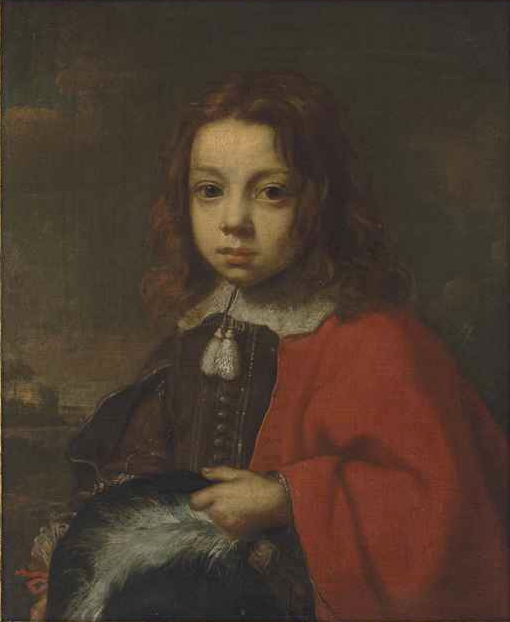
Portrait of a boy

One of his paintings representing Venus and Adonis was reportedly the subject of a poem by the Dutch poet Jan Vos. His work was also lavishly praised in Cornelis de Bie's 1662 book of artist biographies entitled Het Gulden Cabinet. This shows that his work was held in high esteem by other artists of his time. Subsequently, it fell, however, into oblivion.

He remained active in Amsterdam until his death in 1665.

== Work ==
Carel van Savoyen's small extant oeuvre comprises only a dozen portraits and history pieces. He was known for his paintings of religious and mythological subjects as well as for his portraits. In the text underneath the selfportrait of Carel van Savoyen, which was included in Cornelis de Bie's Het Gulden Cabinet, the artist is described as being skilled at painting small figures, mainly of nude women.

Carel van Savoyen also painted genre scenes such as the composition An elegant couple courting in a formal garden (signed, formerly at Galerie Jan de Maere). This painting depicts an elegantly dressed man offering a flower to a lady sitting at a table in a garden with classical statues. An Interior with a Music Party (oil on canvas, Hunterian Museum and Art Gallery, Glasgow), currently attributed by the museum to 'circle of Gillis van Tilborch' is likely also by the hand of Carel van Savoyen. In this painting the lady holding a music score and the man standing behind the harpsichord appear to be the same as the two figures depicted in the signed An elegant couple courting in a formal garden.

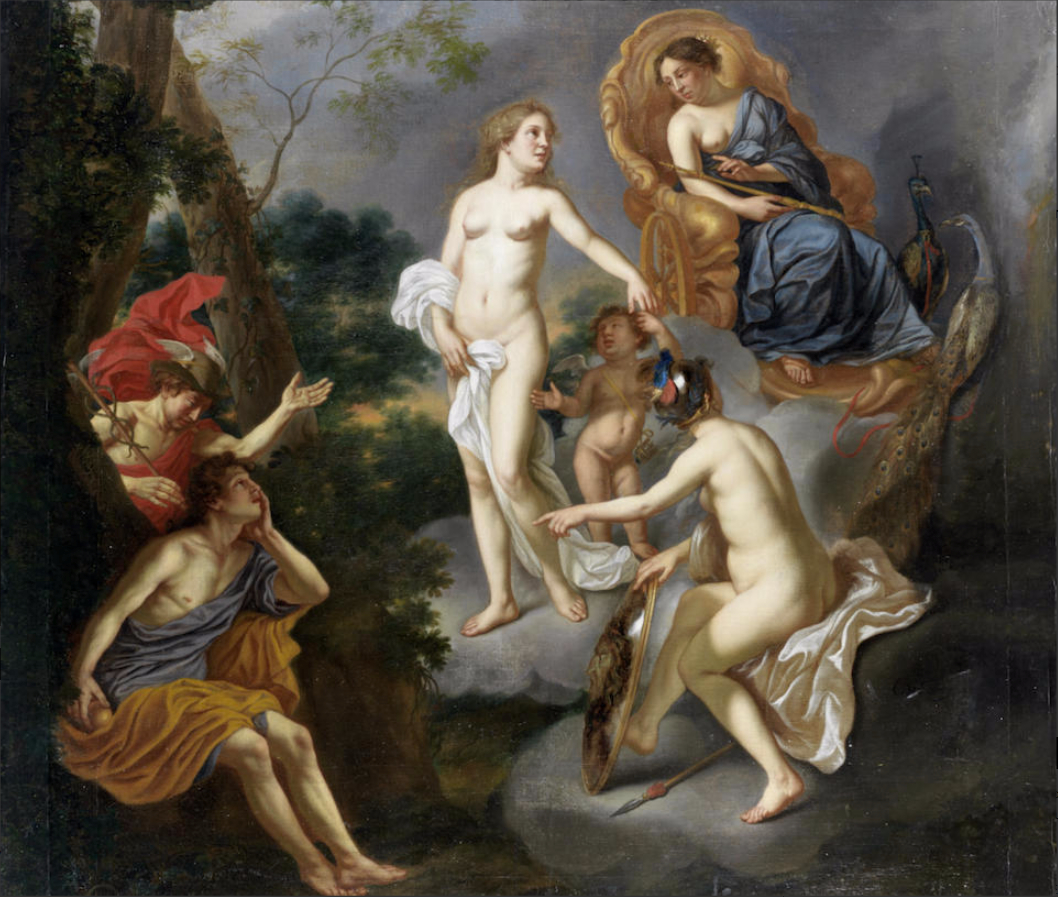
The judgement of Paris

A near-contemporary Amsterdam inventory also lists an allegory by his hand. An example of an allegorical painting by van Savoyen is the composition entitled An allegory of abundance (Signed and dated 1651, at Jean Moust).

During his period of activity in Antwerp van Savoyen followed the style of his master Jan Cossiers and of the important portrait painter Gonzales Coques. In Amsterdam his work became influenced by local artists such as Rembrandt and Gerard de Lairesse. His portrait drawing of Frans Koerten was engraved by Theodor Matham.

A painting by Carel van Savoyen of Jan de Doot holding a kidney stone in the shape of an egg hangs in the Portrait Collection of the Laboratory of Pathology, which is part of the University of Leiden in the Netherlands. The story behind the painting is that Jan de Doot, a Dutch blacksmith, reported to have performed a successful kidney stone removal on himself in 1651.

Carel van Savoyen works can be found in the Hessisches Landesmuseum in Darmstadt, the Musée des Beaux-Arts in Bordeaux, the Greek orthodox chapel in Leipzig and in the old Catholic church of Zaandam.
