= Suture materials comparison chart =

List of common surgical suture materials

Numerous different surgical suture materials exist. The following table compares some of the most common adsorbable sutures.

	Plain catgut	Chromic catgut	Polyglycolide (P.G.A.)	Polydioxanone (PDS)
Description	Adsorbable biological suture material. Plain is an adsorbable suture made by twisting together strands of purified collagen taken from bovine intestines. The natural plain thread is precision ground in order to achieve a monofilament character and treated with a glycerol containing solution. Plain is absorbed by enzymatic degradation.	Adsorbable biological suture material. Chromic is an adsorbable suture made by twisting together strands of purified collagen taken from bovine intestines. Due to undergoing a ribbon stage chromicisation (treatment with chromic acid salts), the chromic offers roughly twice the stitch-holding time of plain catgut. Chromic is absorbed by enzymatic degradation. Note – catgut is no longer used in the UK for human surgery.	A synthetic adsorbable suture material. Braided synthetic adsorbable multifilament made of polyglycolic acid and coated with N-laurin and L-lysine, which render the thread extremely smooth, soft and knot safe.	A synthetic adsorbable suture material. Monofilament synthetic absorbable suture, prepared from the polyester, poly (p-dioxanone).
Composition	Natural purified collagen	Natural purified collagen	Polyglycolic acid	Polyester and poly (p-dioxanone)
Adsorption rate and tensile strength	Strength retention for at least 7 days.	Maintains strength for 10–14 days	84% at 2 weeks, 23% at 4 weeks	80% at 2 weeks, 44% at 8 weeks. Complete absorption within 200 days
Structure	Multifilament	Multifilament	Braided	Monofilament
Origin	Bovine serosa surface finish. Made by twisting together strands of purified collagen taken from the small intestine of healthy ruminants	Bovine serosa. The natural chromic thread is precision ground in order to achieve a monofilament character and treated with a glycerol containing solution	Synthetic	Synthetic
Treatment	Treated with a glycerol-containing solution	Treatment with a glycerol containing solution and chromic acid salts	Coated with magnesium stearate	Uncoated
Type of adsorption	Proteolytic enzymatic digestion complete by 90 days.	Proteolytic enzymatic digestion complete in 70 days. Adsorption by enzymatic digestion and starts losing tensile strength on implantation from 18–21 days of catgut chromic	Adsorption by hydrolysis complete between 60 and 90 days. Always predictable and reliable	Wound support can remain up to 42 days, however tensile strength decreases to about 70% at 14 days and 25% at 42 days
Tissue reaction	Moderate. Plain catgut enjoys lower tissue reaction as compared to chromicised.	Moderate.	?	?
Thread color	Straw	Brown	Violet and undyed	Violet and clear
Size available	USP 6-0 (1 metric) to USP 5 (100 metric).	USP 6-0 (1 metric) to USP 5 (100 metric).	USP 6-0 (1 metric) to USP 2 (5 metric)	USP 6-0 (1 metric) to USP 2 (5 metric)
Sterilization	Sterilizing fluid containing EO	Sterilizing fluid containing EO	E.O. gas.	E.O. gas
Advantages	Very high knot-pull tensile strength, good knot security due to special surface finish, excellent handling features	Very high knot-pull tensile strength, good knot security due to special surface finish, improved smoothness due to the dry presentation of the thread, excellent handling features	High initial tensile strength, guaranteed holding power through the critical wound healing period. Smooth passage through tissue, easy handling, excellent knotting ability, secure knot tying	Tensile strength retention, guaranteed holding power
Indications	For all surgical procedures especially when tissues that regenerate faster are involved. General closure, ophthalmic, orthopedics, obstetrics/gynecology and gastro-intestinal tract surgery.	For all surgical procedures, especially for tissues that regenerate faster.	Subcutaneous, intracutaneous closures, abdominal and thoracic surgeries	PDS is particularly useful where the combination of an adsorbable suture and extended wound support is desirable, pediatric cardiovascular surgery, ophthalmic surgery
Contraindications	Not recommended for incisions that require the sustaining of the tissues for a prolonged period of time.	Not recommended for an incision that requires sustaining of the tissues for a prolonged period of time.	This suture being adsorbable should not be used where extended approximation of tissue is required.	This type of suture being adsorbable is not to be used where prolonged approximation of tissues under stress is required and/ or in conjunction with prosthetic devices
Precautions	Special precautions should be taken in patients with cancer, anemia and malnutrition conditions. They tend to absorb the sutures at a higher rate. Cardiovascular surgery, due to the continued heart contractions. It is absorbed much faster when used in the mouth and in the vagina, due to the presence of microorganisms. Avoid using where long term tissue approximation is needed. Absorption is faster in infected tissues	It is absorbed much faster when used in the mouth and in the vagina, due to the presence of microorganism. Cardiovascular surgery, due to the continued heart contractions. Special precautions should be taken in patients with cancer, anemia and malnutrition conditions. They tend to absorb this suture at a higher rate.	Special precautions should be taken in elderly patients and patients with history of anemia and malnutrition conditions. As with any suture material, adequate knot security requires the accepted surgical technique of flat and square ties.	The PDS suture knots must be properly placed to be secure. Conjunctival and vaginal mucosal sutures remaining in place for extended periods may be associated with localized irritation. Subcuticular sutures should be placed as deeply as possible in order to minimize the erythema and induration normally associated with adsorption.
