= Cauliflower ear =

Permanent deformity caused by physical trauma to the ear

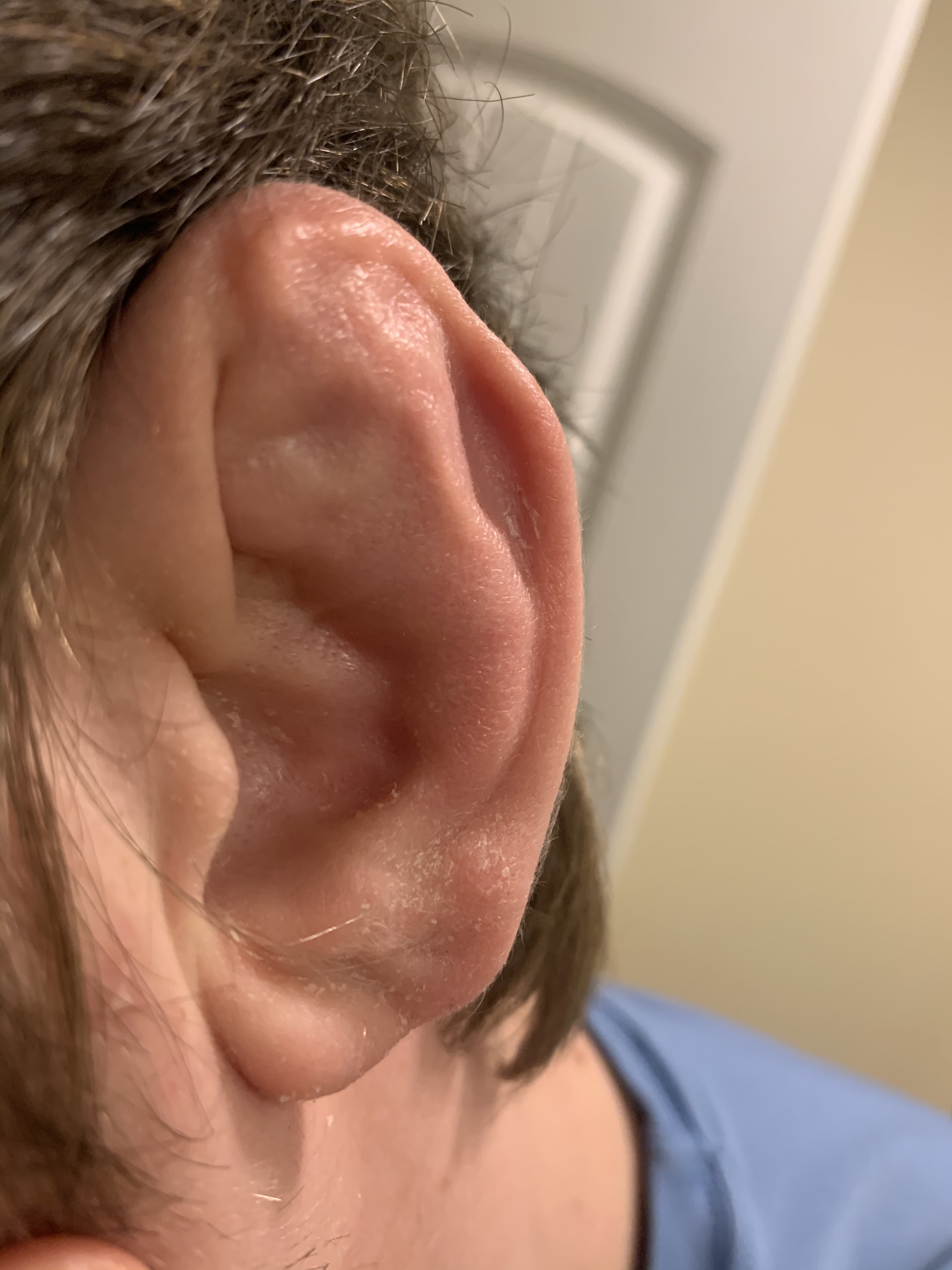
- Cauliflower ear
- Specialty: Otorhinolaryngology

Cauliflower ear is an irreversible condition that occurs when the external portion of the ear is hit and develops a hematoma or other collection of fluid under the perichondrium. This separates the cartilage from the overlying perichondrium that supplies its nutrients, causing it to die and resulting in the formation of fibrous tissue in the overlying skin. As a result, the outer ear becomes permanently swollen and deformed, resembling a cauliflower, hence the name.

The condition is common in sport wrestling, professional wrestling, boxing, and kickboxing, in martial arts such as Brazilian jiu-jitsu, judo, sumo, and mixed martial arts, and in full-contact sports such as rugby union and rugby league.

== Presentation ==
People presenting with possible auricular hematoma often have additional injuries (for example, head/neck lacerations) due to the frequently traumatic causes of auricular hematoma. The ear itself is often tense, fluctuant, and tender with throbbing pain. However, because of potentially more remarkable injuries often associated with auricular hematoma, it can easily be overlooked without directed attention.

== Diagnosis ==
Perichondral hematoma and consequently cauliflower ear are diagnosed clinically. This means that the medical provider will make the diagnosis by using elements of the history of the injury (examples: participation in contact sports, trauma to the ear, previous similar episodes) and combine this with findings on physical exam (examples: tenderness to the area, bruising, deformation of the ear contours) to confirm the diagnosis and decide on the appropriate treatment for the patient.

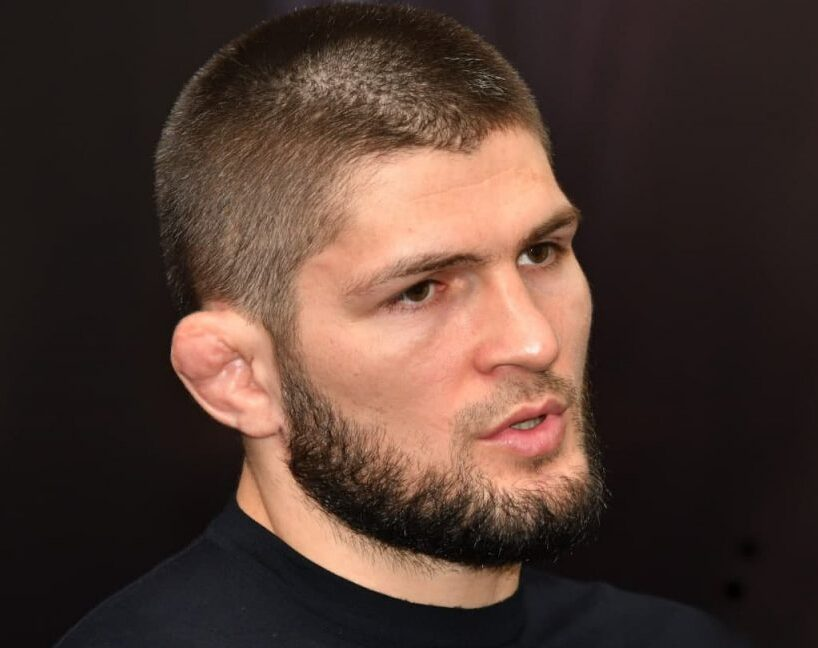
Cauliflower ear of fighter Khabib Nurmagomedov in 2020

To assist with settling on the best form of treatment for cauliflower ear, Yotsuyanagi et al. created a classification system for deciding when surgery is needed and as a guide to what the best approach would be.

Classification of cauliflower ear
Type 1: Minimal deformity with no or slight changes to the outline of the ear		Type 2: Substantial deformity of the outline of the ear	
Type 1A	Deformity is restricted to the concha of the ear	Type 2A	The structural integrity of the ear is intact
Type 1B	Deformity that extends from the antihelix to the helix of the ear	Type 2B	Poor structural integrity of the ear
Type 1C	Deformity that extends throughout the outer ear		

== Causes ==
The most common cause of cauliflower ear is blunt trauma to the ear leading to a hematoma which, if left untreated, eventually heals to give the distinct appearance of cauliflower ear. Participating in contact sports and martial arts is a typical source of such trauma. The structure of the ear is supported by a cartilaginous scaffold consisting of the following distinct components: the helix, antihelix, concha, tragus, and antitragus. The skin that covers this cartilage is extremely thin with virtually no subcutaneous fat while also strongly attached to the perichondrium, which is richly vascularized to supply the avascular cartilage.

Cauliflower ear can also present in the setting of nontraumatic inflammatory injury of auricular connective tissue such as in relapsing polychondritis (RP), a rare rheumatologic disorder in which recurrent episodes of inflammation result in destruction of cartilage of the ears and nose. Joints, eyes, audiovestibular system, cardiovascular system, and respiratory tract can also be involved.

=== Mechanism ===
The components of the ear involved in cauliflower ear are the outer skin, the perichondrium, and the cartilage. The outer ear skin is tightly adherent to the perichondrium because there is almost no subcutaneous fat on the anterior of the ear. This leaves the perichondrium relatively exposed to damage from direct trauma and shear forces, created by a force pushing across the ear like a punch, and increasing the risk of hematoma formation. In an auricular hematoma, blood accumulates between the perichondrium and cartilage. The hematoma mechanically obstructs blood flow from the perichondrium to the avascular cartilage. This lack of perfusion puts the cartilage at risk for becoming necrotic and/or infected. If left untreated, disorganized fibrosis and cartilage formation will occur around the aforementioned cartilaginous components.

Consequently, the concave pinna fills with disorganized connective tissue. The cartilage then deforms and kinks, resulting in the distinctive appearance somewhat resembling a cauliflower. Rapid evacuation of the hematoma restores close contact between the cartilage and perichondrium, thereby reducing the likelihood of deformity by minimizing the ischemia that would otherwise result from a remaining hematoma.

Auricular hematoma most often occurs in the potential space between the helix and the antihelix (scapha) and extends anteriorly into the fossa triangularis. Less frequently, the hematoma may form in the concha or the area in and around the external auditory meatus. Importantly, an auricular hematoma can also occur on the posterior ear surface, or even both surfaces. Risk of necrotic tissue is greatest when both posterior and anterior surfaces are involved, although posterior surface involvement is less likely given its increased quantity of impact-dampening subcutaneous tissue.

== Prevention ==
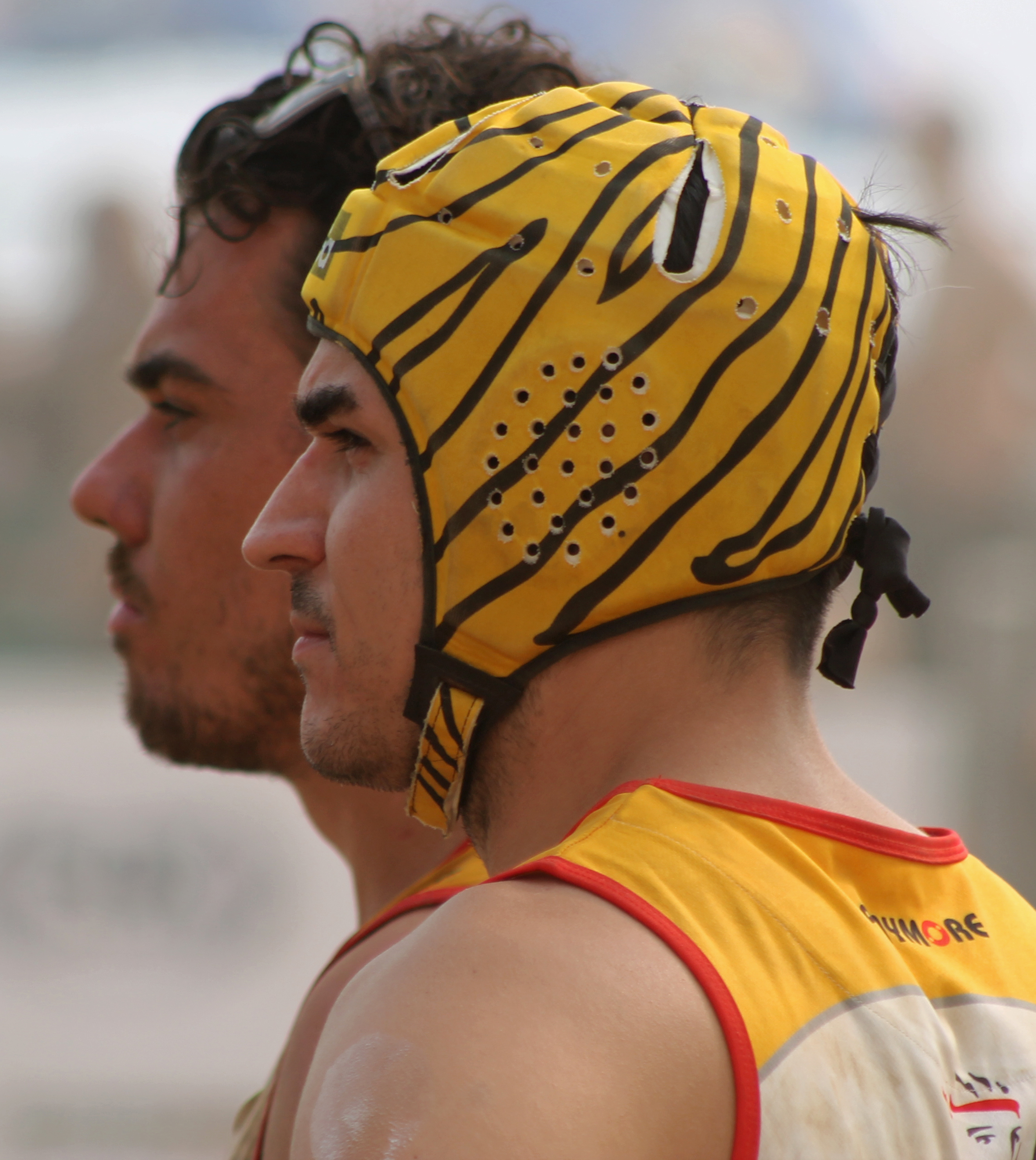
A rugby union player wearing a tiger-print scrum cap, a form of headgear used for shock absorption and protection to the head.

Headgear called a "scrum cap" in rugby, or simply "headgear" or ear guard in wrestling and other martial arts, that protects the ears is worn to help prevent this condition. A specialty ear splint can also be made to keep the ear compressed, so that the damaged ear is unable to fill thus preventing cauliflower ear. For some athletes, however, a cauliflower ear is considered a badge of courage or experience.

== Treatment ==
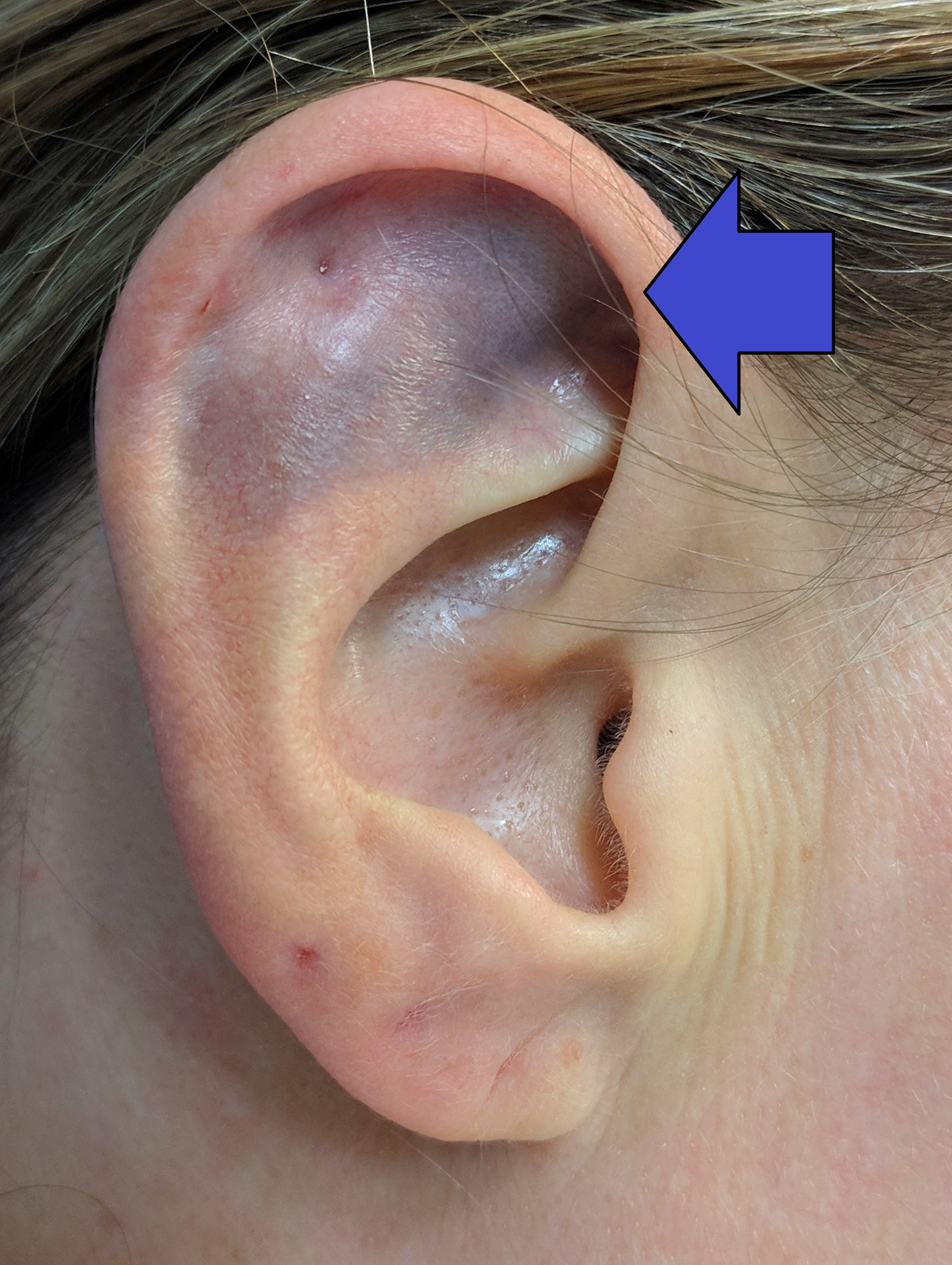
A mild auricular hematoma after drainage

There are many types of treatment for the perichondral hematoma that can lead to cauliflower ear, but the current body of research is unable to identify a single best treatment or protocol. There is definitive evidence that the drainage of this hematoma is better for the prevention of cauliflower deformity when compared to conservative treatment, but the use of bandages and/or splinting after drainage requires more research.

Because an acute hematoma can lead to cauliflower ear, prompt evacuation of the blood can prevent permanent deformity. There are many described techniques for the drainage of blood in the acute stage to prevent hematoma, including aspiration and drainage, incision and drainage, use of continuous suction devices and placing a wick. After the blood has been drained, the prevention of re-accumulation becomes the most pressing issue. This has been achieved with many techniques including: direct pressure dressings, in and out mattress sutures, buttons placed on sutures, thermoplastic splints, sutured cotton balls, and absorbable mattress sutures. The use of simple drainage becomes less useful after six hours from the injury and when there is recurrent trauma. In these cases it has been suggested that open surgical treatment is more effective in returning the cosmetic appearance and prevention of recurrence. The outer ear is prone to infections, so antibiotics are usually prescribed. Pressure can be applied by bandaging which helps the skin and the cartilage to reconnect. Clothes pegs, magnets, and custom molded ear splints can also be used to ensure adequate pressure is applied to the damaged area Without medical intervention the ear can sustain serious damage. Disruption of the ear canal is possible. The outer ear may wrinkle and can become slightly pale due to reduced blood flow; hence the common term "cauliflower ear". Cosmetic procedures are available that can possibly improve the appearance of the ear.

== History ==
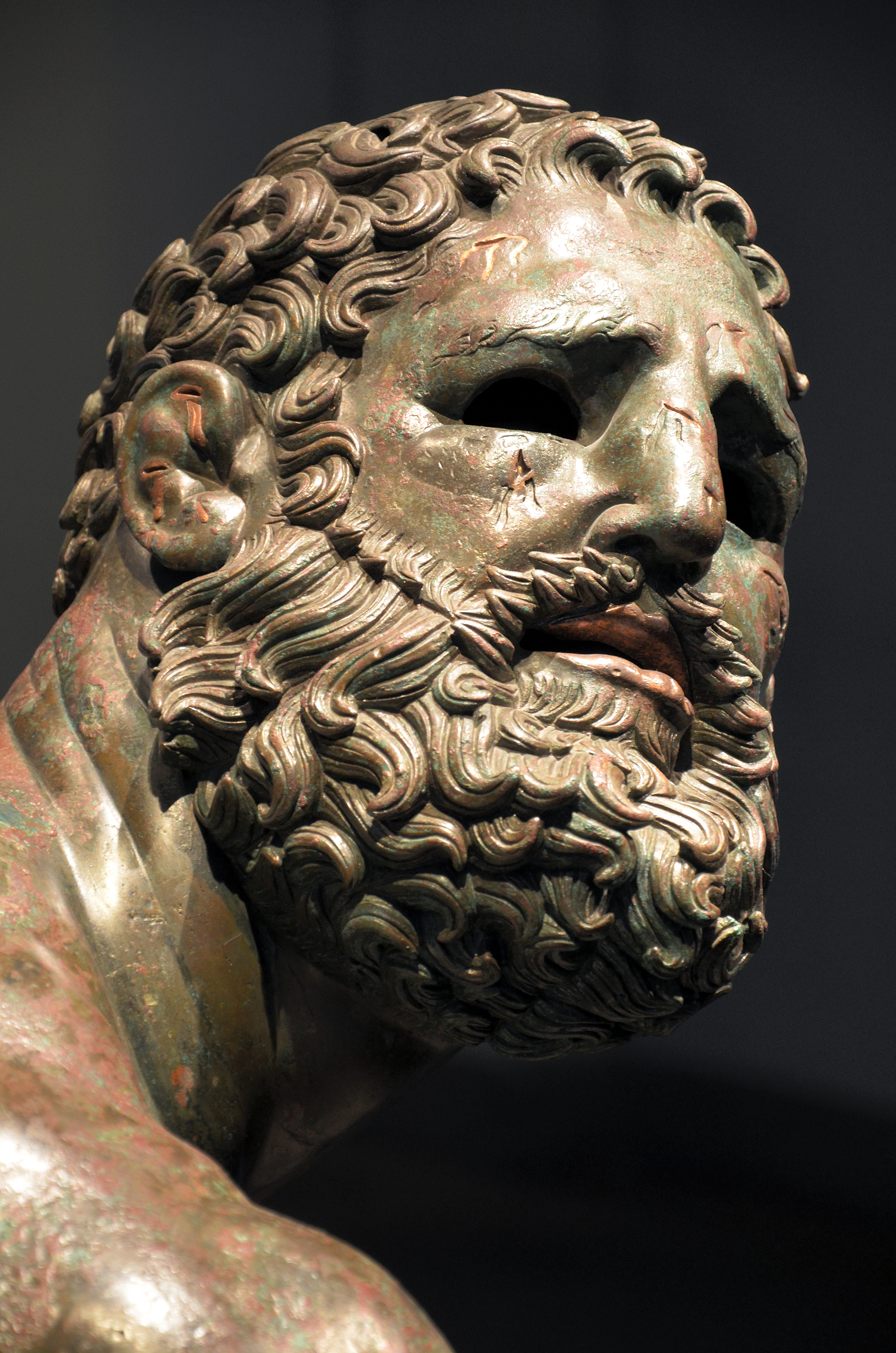
Depiction of cauliflower ear in the Boxer of Quirinal, circa 100–50 BC

The presentation of cauliflower ear was recorded in ancient Greece.

In 19th-century Hong Kong opium dens, opium users would develop cauliflower ear from long periods sleeping on hard wooden pillows.
