= Corner stitch =

Suture technique

The corner stitch is a common suture technique. It used to close wounds that are angled or Y-shaped without appreciably compromising blood supply to the wound tip.

The corner stitch is a variation of the horizontal mattress stitch, and is sometimes called the "half-buried horizontal mattress stitch". The needle enters the skin on one side of the obtuse angle of the wound, passes through the deep dermis of the corner flap, and is re-inserted through the dermis of the other side of the obtuse wound angle. It finally re-emerges through the epidermis on the side of the obtuse angle, adjacent to the initial entry point.
