= Vertical mattress stitch =

Surgical Seam for four stitches

All bites are in the same vertical plane.

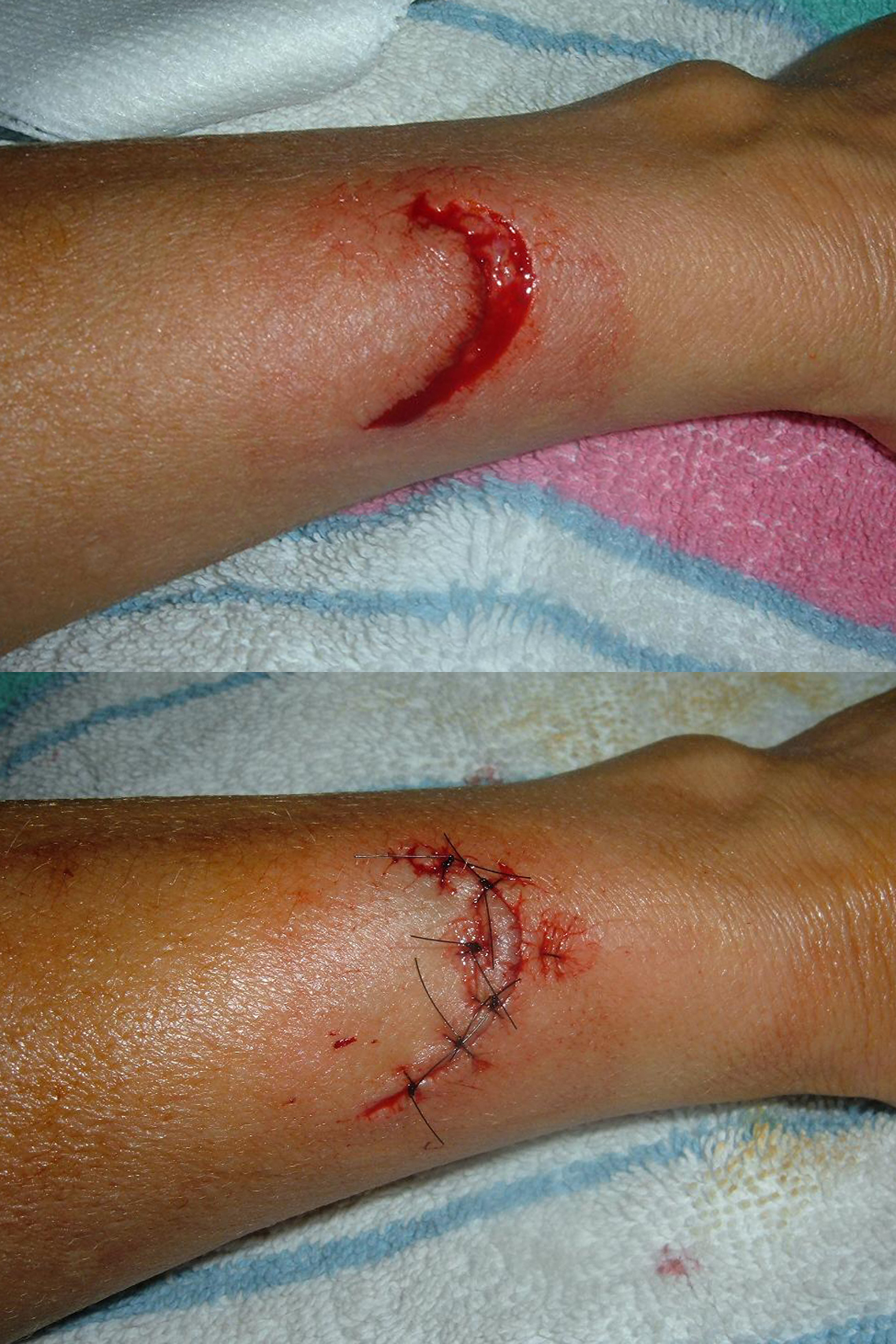
The middle stitch is a vertical mattress the others simple interrupted stitches

The vertical mattress stitch, often called vertical Donati stitch (named after the Italian surgeon Mario Donati), is a suture type used to close skin wounds. The advantages of the vertical mattress suture are that it provides closure for both deep and superficial layers, and also allows perfect eversion and vertical opposition of the superficial skin edges. Its disadvantage is a relatively high propensity to dig into the skin and cause prominent stitch mark scars.

== Uses ==
The vertical mattress stitch is most commonly used in anatomic locations which tend to invert, such as the posterior aspect of the neck, and sites of greater skin laxity such as the closure of lax skin after removing a dermoid cyst or reduced subcutaneous tissue (e.g., the shin) that do not provide adequate subcutaneous tissue for dermal closure. It is useful for deep lacerations, where it can replace two layers of deep and superficial sutures. It can help bring the deep layers together alone, allowing several simple interrupted or running stitches to close the remaining superficial skin. Vertical mattress sutures are not recommended for sites such as the palm of the hand, where important structures lie fairly superficial to the epidermis.

== Technique ==
The vertical mattress stitch is placed in a "far-far-near-near" order of bites. The "far-far" loop enters and exits the skin surface at a 90 degree angle, some 4 mm to 8 mm from the wound margin. It passes relatively deeply into the dermis. The "near-near" loop enters and exits the skin surface 1 mm to 2 mm from the wound margin, traversing the wound at 1 mm depth. Because of the precise degree of control that the vertical mattress stitch provides, bites must be symmetrical, especially the depth of the near-near loop, or the wound will invariably misalign and heal with a "shelf" on one side. The knot is tightened only until sufficient opposition and eversion is achieved. Over-enthusiastic tightening increases the likelihood that the suture material cuts into the skin, bearing in mind the swelling that will ensue during wound healing. Bolstering (placing small rolls of gauze under the surface loops prior to tightening) prevents the suture material from cutting down into the skin.

== Advantages and disadvantages ==
The vertical mattress stitch has many effects due to its quadruple ability to achieve deep and superficial wound closure, edge eversion and precise vertical alignment of the superficial wound margins. Although, due to its time-consuming nature, many clinicians infrequently pursue such a technique. However, its advantage of precise control also means that the vertical mattress stitch is unforgiving of operator error, particularly in regard to poor vertical alignment of edges. As mentioned above, the vertical mattress stitch is prone to dig into the skin, like a cheese cutter wire, so it is more likely than other suture types to leave "railroad marks" - small scars along the main wound. Bolstering reduces this problem but necessarily increases the complexity of the stitch. Overall, the propensity of the vertical mattress suture to create railroad marks limits its use in cosmetically sensitive areas, such as the face, and it remains imperative to remove it as early as possible when it is used elsewhere on the body.
