= Catgut =

Type of cord made from refined natural fibers of animal intestines

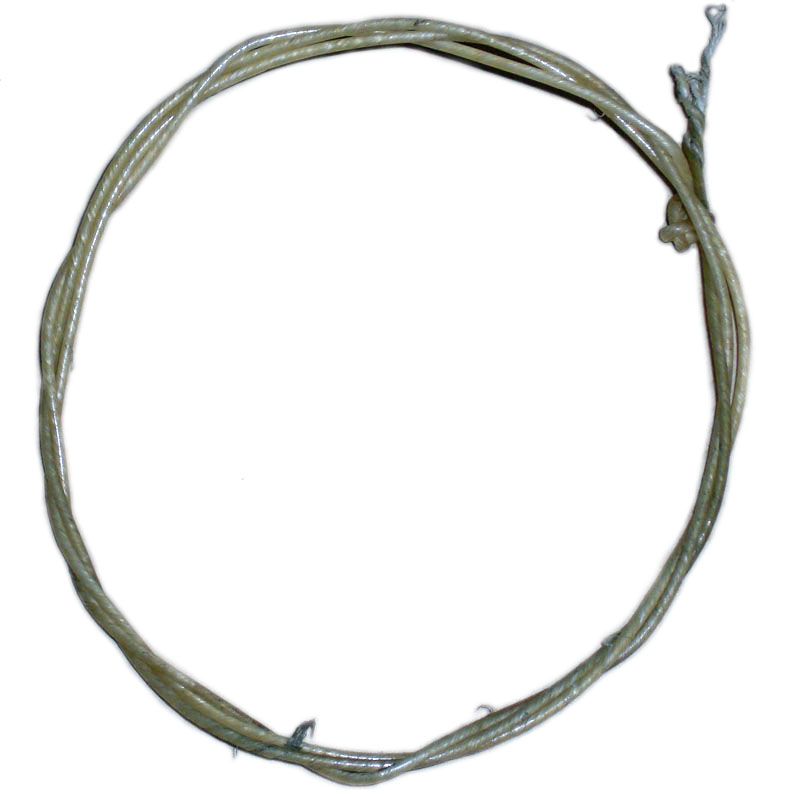
A coil of catgut cello string

Catgut (also known as gut) is a type of cord that is prepared from the natural fiber found in the walls of animal intestines. Catgut makers usually use sheep or goat intestines, but occasionally use the intestines of cattle, hogs, horses, mules, or donkeys. Despite the name, catgut has never been documented to be made from cat intestines.

== Etymology ==
"Catgut" may derive by folk etymology from kitgut or kitstring — the dialectal word kit, meaning fiddle, having at some point been confused with the word kit for a young cat, the word "kit" being possibly derived from Welsh. In the 16th century a kit was a "small fiddle used by dancing teachers," a name probably derived from a shortening of Old English cythere, from Latin cithara, from Greek kithara (see guitar).

== Common uses ==
=== Musical instruments ===
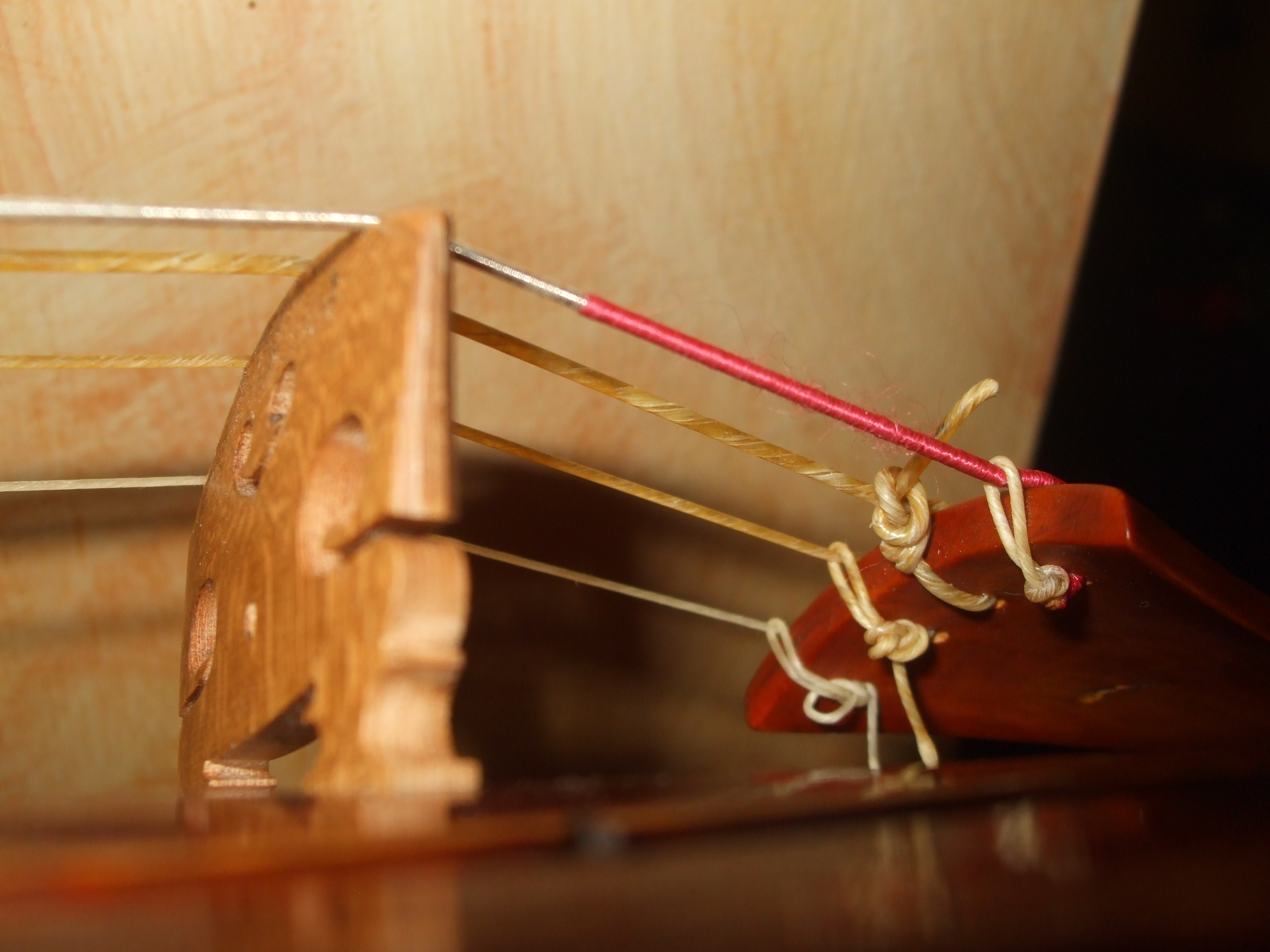
Catgut violin strings

Historically, catgut was the most common material for the strings of harps, lutes, violins, violas, cellos, double basses, viols, acoustic guitars, and other stringed musical instruments, as well as the snare wires of older snare drums.

Most musical instruments produced today use strings with cores made of other materials, generally steel or synthetic polymer. Gut strings are the natural choice for many classical and baroque string players, and gut strings are still most commonly preferred in concert-tension pedal harps and some lever harps because they give a richer, darker sound as well as withstanding high tension within low alto (E3-E5), tenor (C3-C5), and high-bass (A2-A4) ranges. Many acoustic guitarists moved away from gut strings in the early 1900s when the C. F. Martin & Company introduced steel strings, which gave greater volume to the guitar.

"The demand for steel came from ensemble players, who couldn't make themselves heard clearly without it."

Within a few years the majority of Martin guitars were made with steel strings to accommodate the demand. After World War II, most classical and flamenco guitarists switched from catgut to the new nylon strings for their greater smoothness, durability, and stability of intonation.

Before 1900, the reputedly best strings for musical instruments came from Italy. Musicians believed the best were from Naples, though Rome and other Italian cities also produced excellent strings. Today high quality gut strings are produced mostly in Italy, Germany, and the United States. They are also made in other countries for local use; for example in India, Mali, and Morocco.

=== Sutures ===
Catgut suture was once a widely used material in surgical settings. Catgut sutures remain in use in developing countries where they are locally less expensive and easier to obtain. Catgut treated with chromium salts, known as chromic catgut, is also used in surgery.

=== Tennis racquets ===
Natural gut is still used as a high-performance string in tennis racquets, although it had more popularity in the past and is being displaced by synthetic strings.

=== Clocks ===
Catgut was also used traditionally to hang the weights in grandfather clocks, although has been replaced in modern times by metal wire, woven metal rope, or fine chains.

=== Watches ===
Catgut was also used in early pocket timepieces from their invention up until the use of the Fusee chain.

== Production ==
To prepare catgut, workers clean the small intestines, free them from any fat, and steep them in water. Then they scrape off the external membrane with a blunt knife, and steep the intestines again for some time in potassium hydroxide. Then they smooth and equalize the intestines by drawing them out. Lean animals yield the toughest gut. Next, they twist the prepared gut strands together to make string. String diameter is determined by the thickness of the individual guts, and by the number used. A thin string, such as a violin E, uses only three or four gut strands, whereas a double bass string may use 20 or more. After twisting and drying, workers polish the strings to the required diameter.

Before the 20th century, the strings were simply rubbed with an abrasive to smooth them. Today they are generally ground down to the desired diameter using a centerless grinder. After drying and polishing, workers bleach and disinfect the strings using sulfur dioxide, dye them if necessary, and sort them into sizes.

Catgut sutures are normally treated with a chromium salt solution to resist body enzymes to slow the process of degradation and absorption into the body. These are called catgut chromic sutures; untreated catgut sutures are called catgut plain sutures.
