= Surgical suture =

Medical device used to hold body tissues together

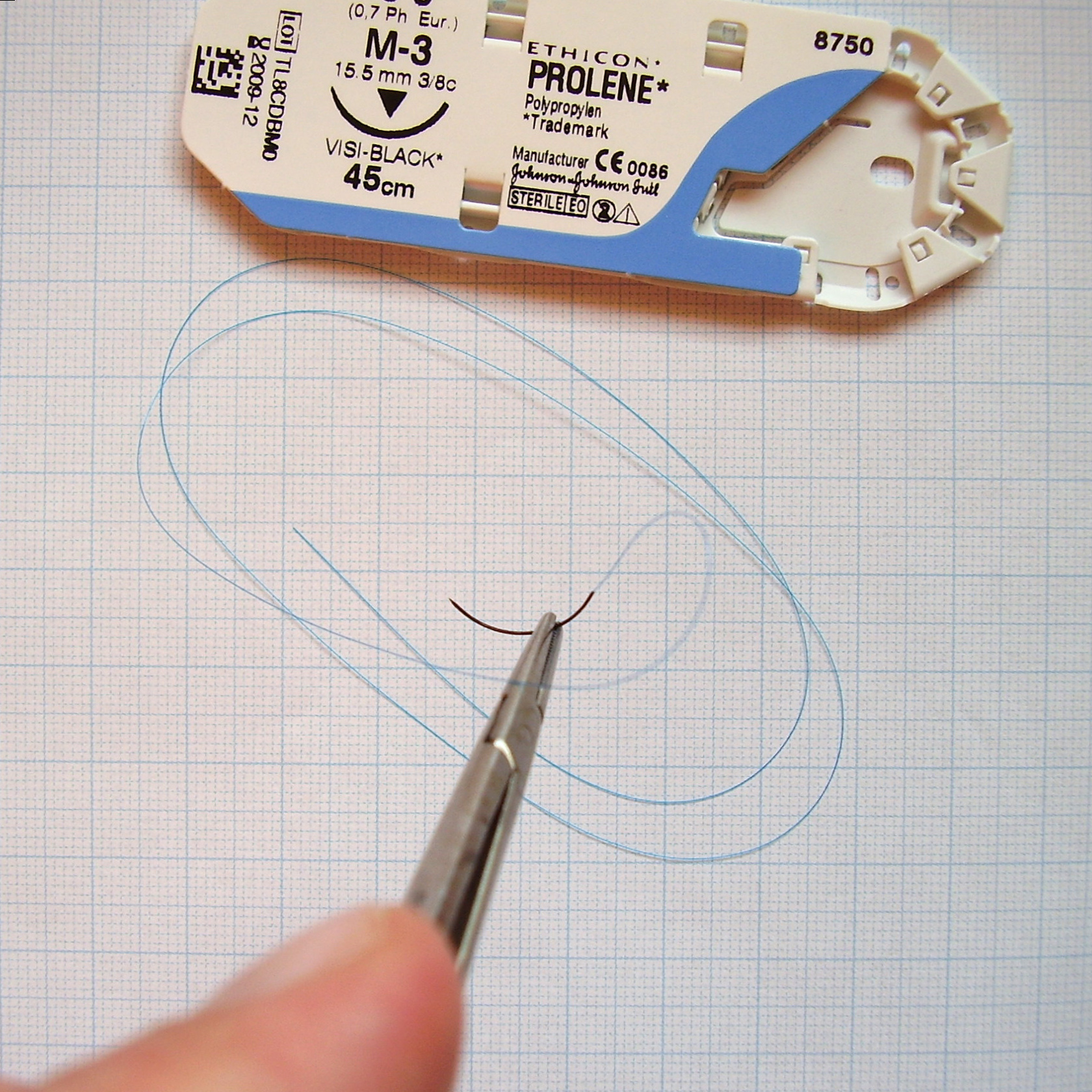
- Surgical suture and 6-0 gauge polypropylene thread held with a needle holder. Packaging shown above.

A surgical suture, also known as a stitch or stitches, is a medical device used to hold body tissues together and approximate wound edges after an injury or surgery. Application generally involves using a needle with an attached length of thread. There are numerous types of suture which differ by needle shape and size as well as thread material and characteristics. Selection of surgical suture should be determined by the characteristics and location of the wound or the specific body tissues being approximated.

In selecting the needle, thread, and suturing technique to use for a specific patient, a medical care provider must consider the tensile strength of the specific suture thread needed to efficiently hold the tissues together depending on the mechanical and shear forces acting on the wound as well as the thickness of the tissue being approximated. One must also consider the elasticity of the thread and ability to adapt to different tissues, as well as the memory of the thread material which lends to ease of use for the operator. Different suture characteristics lend way to differing degrees of tissue reaction and the operator must select a suture that minimizes the tissue reaction while still keeping with appropriate tensile strength.

== Needles ==
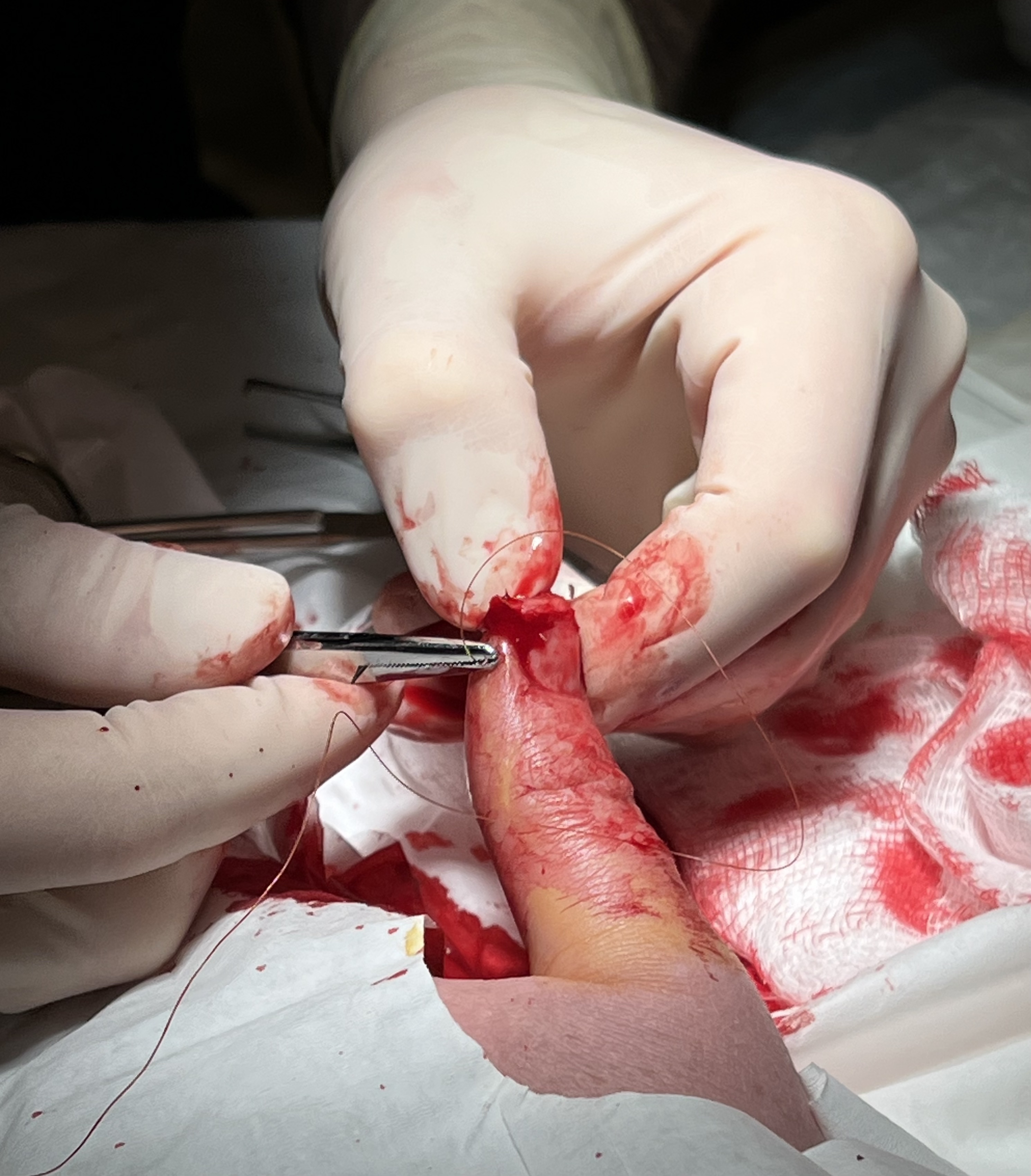
A surgeon suturing a wound in a person's thumb

Historically, surgeons used reusable needles with holes (called "eyes"), which must be threaded before use just as is done with a needle and thread prior to sewing fabric. The advantage of this is that any combination of thread and needle may be chosen to suit the job at hand. Swaged (or "atraumatic") needles with sutures consist of a pre-packed eyeless needle already attached (by swaging) to a specific length of suture thread. This saves time, and eliminates the most difficult threading of very fine needles and sutures.

Two additional benefits are reduced drag and less potential damage to friable tissue during suturing. In a swaged suture the thread is of narrower diameter than the needle, whereas it protrudes on both sides in an eyed needle. Being narrower, the thread in a swaged suture has less drag when passing through tissue than the needle, and, not protruding, is less likely to traumatize friable tissue, earning the combination the designation "atraumatic".

There are several shapes of surgical needles. These include:

- Straight
- 1/4 circle
- 3/8 circle
- 1/2 circle. Subtypes of this needle shape include, from larger to smaller size, CT, CT-1, CT-2 and CT-3.
- 5/8 circle
- compound curve
- half curved (also known as ski)
- half curved at both ends of a straight segment (also known as canoe)

The ski and canoe needle design allows curved needles to be straight enough to be used in laparoscopic surgery, where instruments are inserted into the abdominal cavity through narrow cannulas.

Needles may also be classified by their point geometry; examples include:

- taper (needle body is round and tapers smoothly to a point)
- cutting (needle body is triangular and has a sharpened cutting edge on the inside curve)
- reverse cutting (cutting edge on the outside)
- trocar point or tapercut (needle body is round and tapered, but ends in a small triangular cutting point)
- blunt points for sewing friable tissues
- side cutting or spatula points (flat on top and bottom with a cutting edge along the front to one side) for eye surgery

Finally, atraumatic needles may be permanently swaged to the suture or may be designed to come off the suture with a sharp straight tug. These "pop-offs" are commonly used for interrupted sutures, where each suture is only passed once and then tied.

Sutures can withstand different amounts of force based on their size; this is quantified by the U.S.P. Needles Pull Specifications.

== Thread ==
=== Materials ===
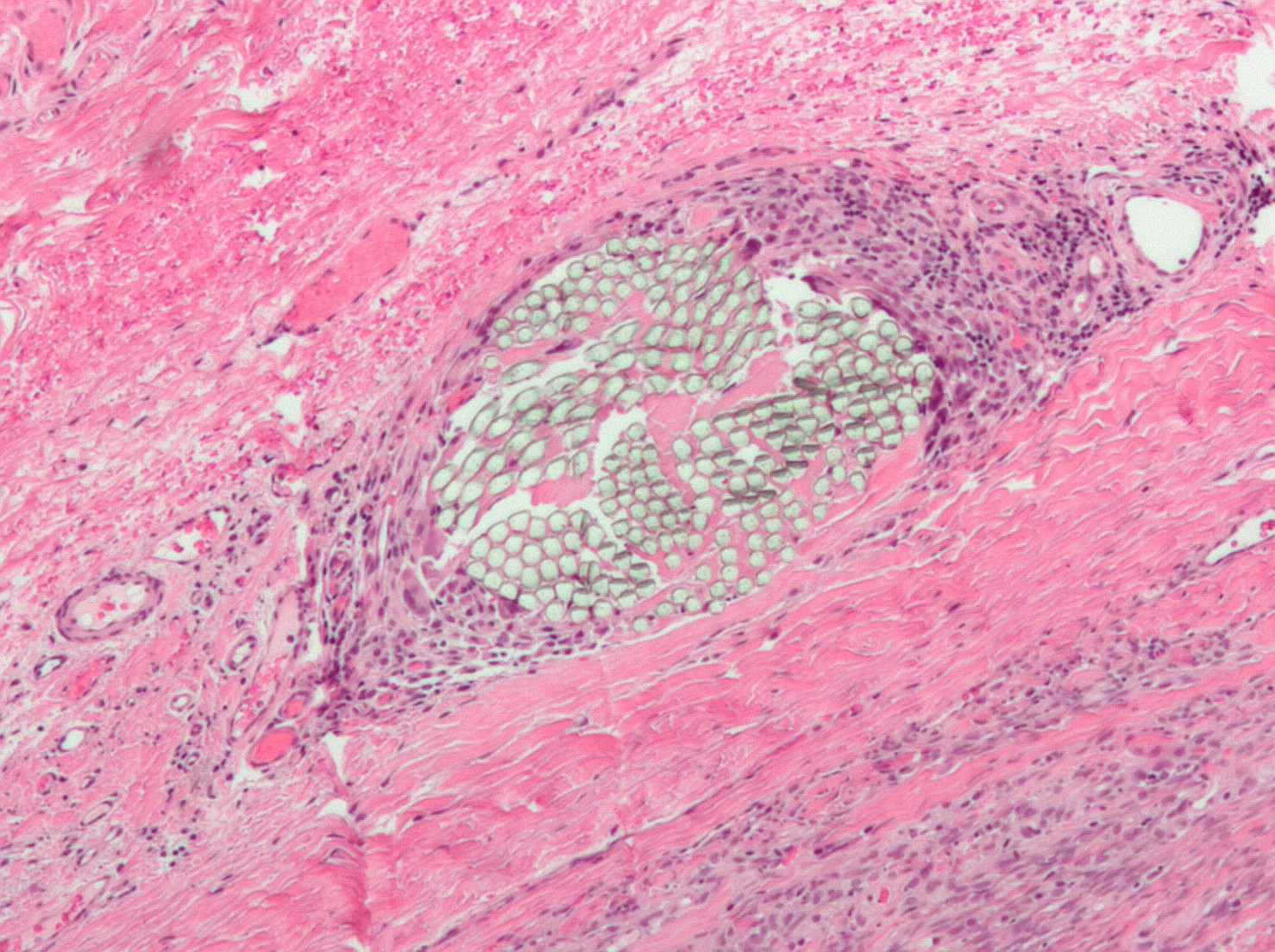
Micrograph of a H&E stained tissue section showing a non-absorbable multi-filament surgical suture with a surrounding foreign-body giant cell reaction

Suture material is often broken down into absorbable thread versus non-absorbable thread, which is further delineated into synthetic fibers versus natural fibers. Another important distinction among suture material is whether it is monofilament or polyfilament (braided)

==== Monofilament versus polyfilament ====
Monofilament fibers have less tensile strength but create less tissue trauma and are more appropriate with delicate tissues where tissue trauma can be more significant such as small blood vessels. Polyfilament (braided) sutures are composed of multiple fibers and are generally greater in diameter with greater tensile strength, however, they tend to have greater tissue reaction and theoretically have more propensity to harbor bacteria.

==== Other properties to consider ====
- Tensile strength: the ability of the suture to hold tissues in place without breaking.
- Elasticity: the ability of the suture material to adapt to changing tissues such as in cases of edema.
- Tissue reactivity: inflammatory response of the surrounding tissue that can cause materials to break down quicker and lose tensile strength. Non absorbable synthetic suture have the lowest of tissue reactivity, while the absorbable natural fibers have the highest rates of tissue reactivity.
- Knot security: the ability of the suture to maintain a knot that holds the thread in place.

==== Absorbable ====
Absorbable sutures are either degraded via proteolysis or hydrolysis and should not be utilized on body tissue that would require greater than two months of tensile strength. It is generally used internally during surgery or to avoid further procedures for individuals with low likelihood of returning for suture removal. To-date, the available data indicates that the objective short-term wound outcomes are equivalent for absorbable and non-absorbable sutures, and there is equipoise amongst surgeons.

==== Natural absorbable ====
Natural absorbable material includes plain catgut, chromic catgut and fast catgut which are all produced from the collagen extracted from bovine intestines. They are all polyfilaments which have different degradations times ranging from 3–28 days. This material is often used for body tissue with low mechanical or shearing force and rapid healing time.

==== Plain gut (polyfilament) ====
- Description: Maintains original strength for 7–10 days and full degradation occurs in 10 weeks.
- Advantages/disadvantages: Excellent elasticity allowing for adaptation to tissue swelling. Passes through the skin with very little tissue trauma occurrence. Poor handling and high tissue reactivity causing quick loss of tensile strength.
- Common use: best used in rapidly healing tissues with good blood supply i.e. mucosal tissues.

==== Chromic gut (polyfilament) ====
- Description: Maintains original strength for 21–28 days and full degradation occurs in 16–18 weeks.
- Advantages/disadvantages: Excellent elasticity allowing for adaptation to tissue swelling. Passes through the skin with very little tissue trauma occurrence. Improved handling and decreased tissue reactivity due to chromic salt coating.
- Common use: skin closure (face), mucosa, genitalia.

==== Fast gut (polyfilament) ====
- Description: Treated with heat to further break down protein and allow for more rapid absorption in bodily tissues. Tensile strength less than a week (3–5 days).
- Advantages/disadvantages: Excellent elasticity allowing for adaptation to tissue swelling. Passes through the skin with very little tissue trauma occurrence.
- Common use: Advised for skin closure only generally on the mucosa or face.

==== Synthetic absorbable ====
Synthetic absorbable material includes polyglactic acid, polyglycolic acid, poliglecaprone, polydioxanone, and polytrimethylene carbonate. Among these are monofilaments, polyfilaments and braided sutures. In general synthetic materials will keep tensile strength for longer due to less local tissue inflammation.

==== Poliglecaprone (monofilament, Monocryl, Monocryl Plus, Suruglyde) ====
- Description: copolymer of synthetic materials. Loses tensile strength quickly; sixty percent lost in the first week. All strength lost within 3 weeks.
- Advantages/disadvantages: high tensile strength, excellent elasticity, excellent cosmetic outcomes, decreased hypertrophic scarring, minimal tissue reaction, good knot security originally; however, the material makes the security unreliable over time, thus it is important to keep ears of material long.
- Common use: Advised for subcutaneous and superficial tissue closure.

==== Polyglycolic acid (polyfilament, Dexon) ====
- Description: synthetic polymer that loses all tensile strength in by 25 days. Either dyed green for visibility or undyed.
- Advantages/disadvantages: minimal tissue reaction, good tensile strength, good handling, but poor knot security.
- Common use: subcutaneous tissue.

==== Polyglactin 910 (polyfilament, Vicryl) ====
- Description: loss of all tensile strength in 28 days.
- Advantages/disadvantages: minimal tissue reaction, good tensile strength, good knot security,
- Common use: subcutaneous tissue, skin closure (avoid dyed Vicryl on face).

==== Polyglactin 910 Irradiated (polyfilament, Vicryl Rapid) ====
- Description: sourced as vicryl is with irradiation to break down material for quicker absorption. Loss of all tensile strength in 5–7 days.
- Advantages/disadvantages: minimal tissue reaction, good tensile strength, fair good handling and good knot security.
- Common use: scalp and facial laceration closure.

==== Polyglyconate (monofilament, Maxon) ====
- Description: co polymer product of synthetic materials. Loses 75% of the tensile strength after 40 days.
- Advantages/disadvantages: minimal tissue reaction, excellent tensile strength, good handling.
- Common use: subcutaneous use often an alternative to PDS due to better handling and slightly superior tensile strength.

==== Polydioxanone closures (PDS, monofilament) ====
- Description: loss of tensile strength in 36–53 days.
- Advantages/disadvantages: minimal tissue reaction, good tensile strength, but poor handling.
- Common use: subcutaneous with need of high tensile strength (abdominal incision closure).

==== Non-absorbable ====
These sutures hold greater tensile strength for longer periods of time and are not subject to degradation. They are appropriate for tissues with a high degree of mechanical or shear force (tendons, certain skin location). They also supply the operator with greater ease of use due to less thread memory.

===== Natural =====
Silk (polyfilament, Permahand, Ethicon; Sofsilk, Covidien)

- Description: surgical silk is a protein derived from silkworms that is coated to minimize friction and water absorption.
- Advantages/disadvantages: This material has good tensile strength, is easy to handle and has excellent knot security. However, it is rarely used internally due to its significant tissue reaction which causes loss of tensile strength over months.
- Common use: Due to advancements in sutures, there is no longer indication for use of surgical silk. However, it is still commonly used in dentistry for mucosal surfaces or to secure surgical tubes on the bodies surface.

===== Synthetic =====
Synthetic materials include nylon, polypropylene and surgical steel all of which are monofilaments with great tensile strength.

Nylon (monofilaments, Dermalon, Ethilon)

- Description: polyamide
- Advantages/disadvantages: Excellent tensile strength. However, poor handling and poor knot security due to high material memory.
- Common use: Excellent for superficial skin closure due to minimal tissue reactivity. It is the most commonly used skin suture due to its excellent adaptability to potentially expanding tissues (edema).

Nylon (polyfilaments, Nurolon, Surgilon, Supramid)

- Description: polyamide
- Advantages/disadvantages: Excellent tensile strength, increased usability, and increased knot security as compared to its monofilamentous counterpart. However, its polyfilamentous nature is said to increase risk of infection.
- Common use: soft tissue, vessel ligations and superficial skin (specifically facial lacerations).

Braided polyester (polyfilament, Ethibond, Dagrofil, Synthofil, PremiCron, Synthofil)

- Description: made from polyethylene terephthalate, there are various brands and configurations of this type of suture. Many are braided, coated in silicone and dyed for visibility.
- Advantages/disadvantages: Good handling, good knot security and high tensile strength due to low tissue reactivity. However, this suture can create more tissue trauma when passing through the skin and is more expensive than its counterparts
- Common use: Rare, pediatric valvular surgery, alternative to surgical steel for orthopedic surgery due to superior handling.

Polybutester (monofilament, Novafil)

- Description: A copolymer of polyester.
- Advantages/disadvantages: low tissue reactivity, good handling, high tensile strength that is greater than most other monofilaments, good elasticity during increasing edema.
- Common use: rare, tendon repairs, plastics (pull out subcuticular stitch)

Surgical steel

- Description: synthetic mixture of multiple alloys.
- Advantages/disadvantages: Tensile strength is exceptional with very little tissue reactivity, thus maintaining minimal degradation over time. This suture material has very poor handling.
- Common use: orthopedics, sternum closure.

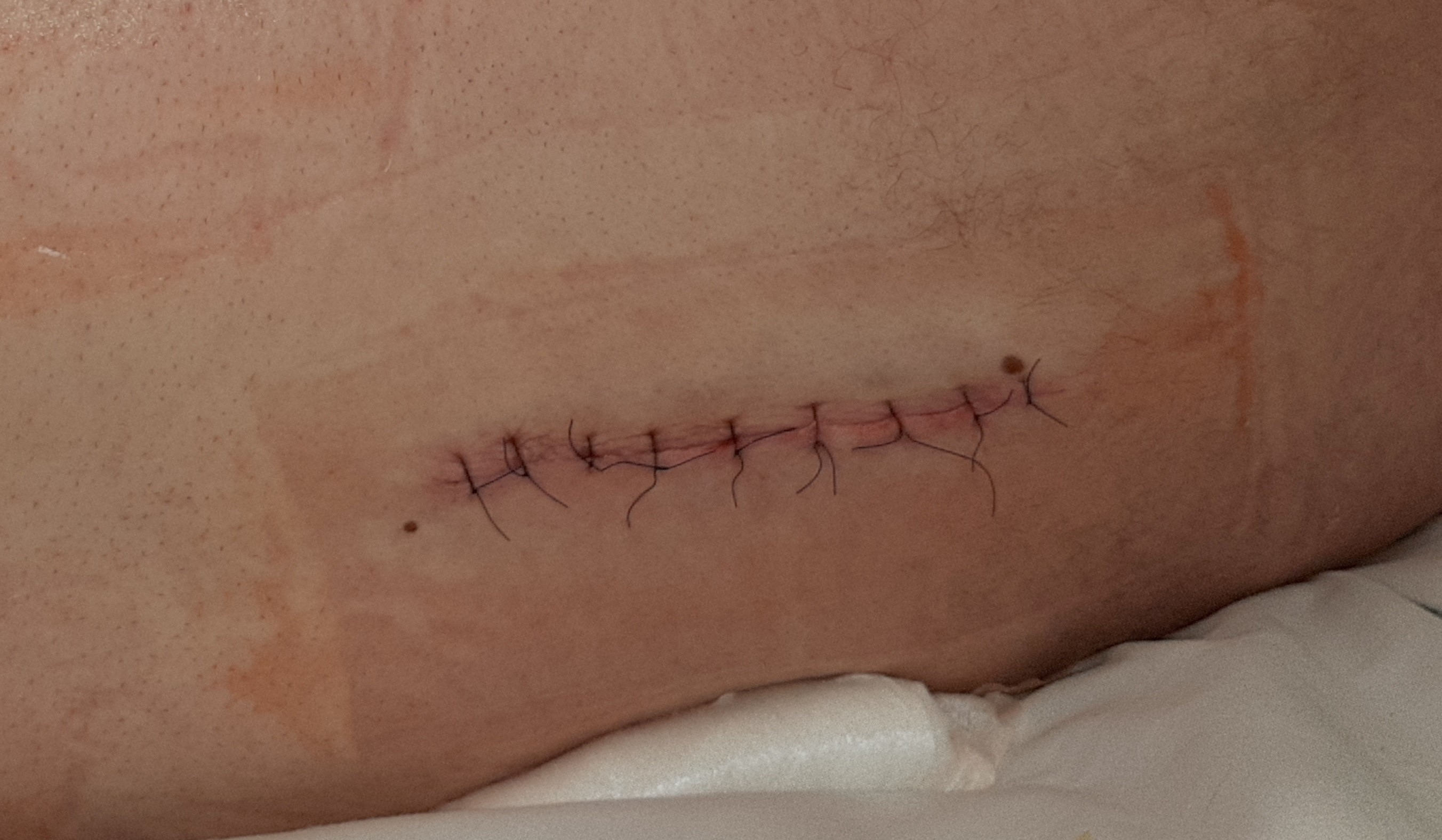
During the first dressing, Redon's drain was removed and the sutures were checked (surgical suture)

=== Sizes ===
Suture sizes are defined by the United States Pharmacopeia (U.S.P.). Sutures were originally manufactured ranging in size from #1 to #6, with #1 being the smallest. A #4 suture would be roughly the diameter of a tennis racquet string. The manufacturing techniques, derived at the beginning from the production of musical strings, did not allow thinner diameters. As the procedures improved, #0 was added to the suture diameters, and later, thinner and thinner threads were manufactured, which were identified as #00 (#2-0 or #2/0) to #000000 (#6-0 or #6/0).

Modern sutures range from #5 (heavy braided suture for orthopedics) to #11-0 (fine monofilament suture for ophthalmics). Atraumatic needles are manufactured in all shapes for most sizes. The actual diameter of thread for a given U.S.P. size differs depending on the suture material class.

USP designation	Collagen diameter (mm)	Synthetic absorbable diameter (mm)	Non-absorbable diameter (mm)	American wire gauge
11-0			0.01	
10-0	0.02	0.02	0.02	
9-0	0.03	0.03	0.03	
8-0	0.05	0.04	0.04	
7-0	0.07	0.05	0.05	
6-0	0.1	0.07	0.07	38–40
5-0	0.15	0.1	0.1	35–38
4-0	0.2	0.15	0.15	32–34
3-0	0.3	0.2	0.2	29–32
2-0	0.35	0.3	0.3	28
0	0.4	0.35	0.35	26–27
1	0.5	0.4	0.4	25–26
2	0.6	0.5	0.5	23–24
3	0.7	0.6	0.6	22
4	0.8	0.6	0.6	21–22
5		0.7	0.7	20–21
6			0.8	19–20
7				18

== Techniques ==
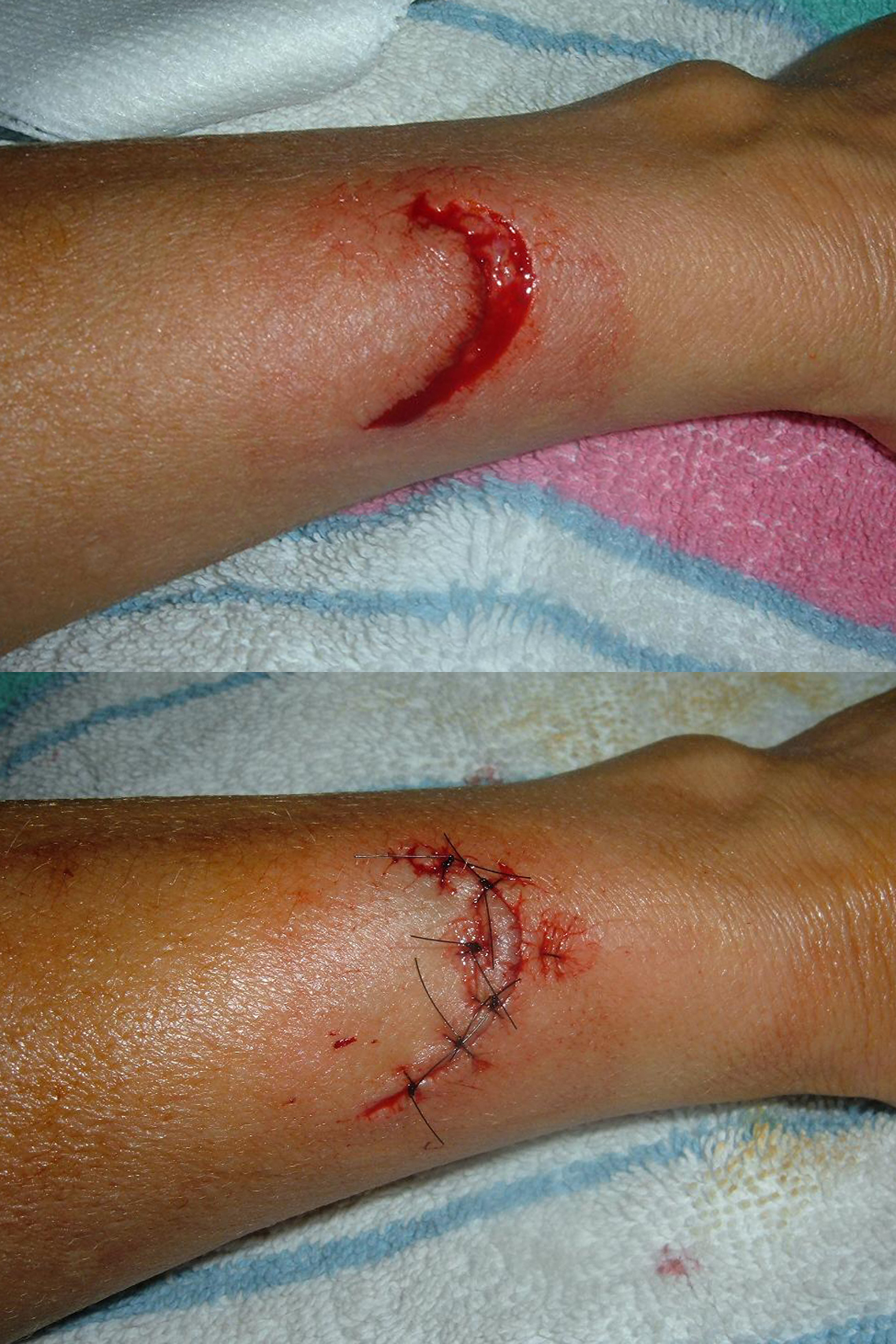
A wound before and after suture closure. The closure incorporates five simple interrupted sutures and one vertical mattress suture (center) at the apex of the wound.

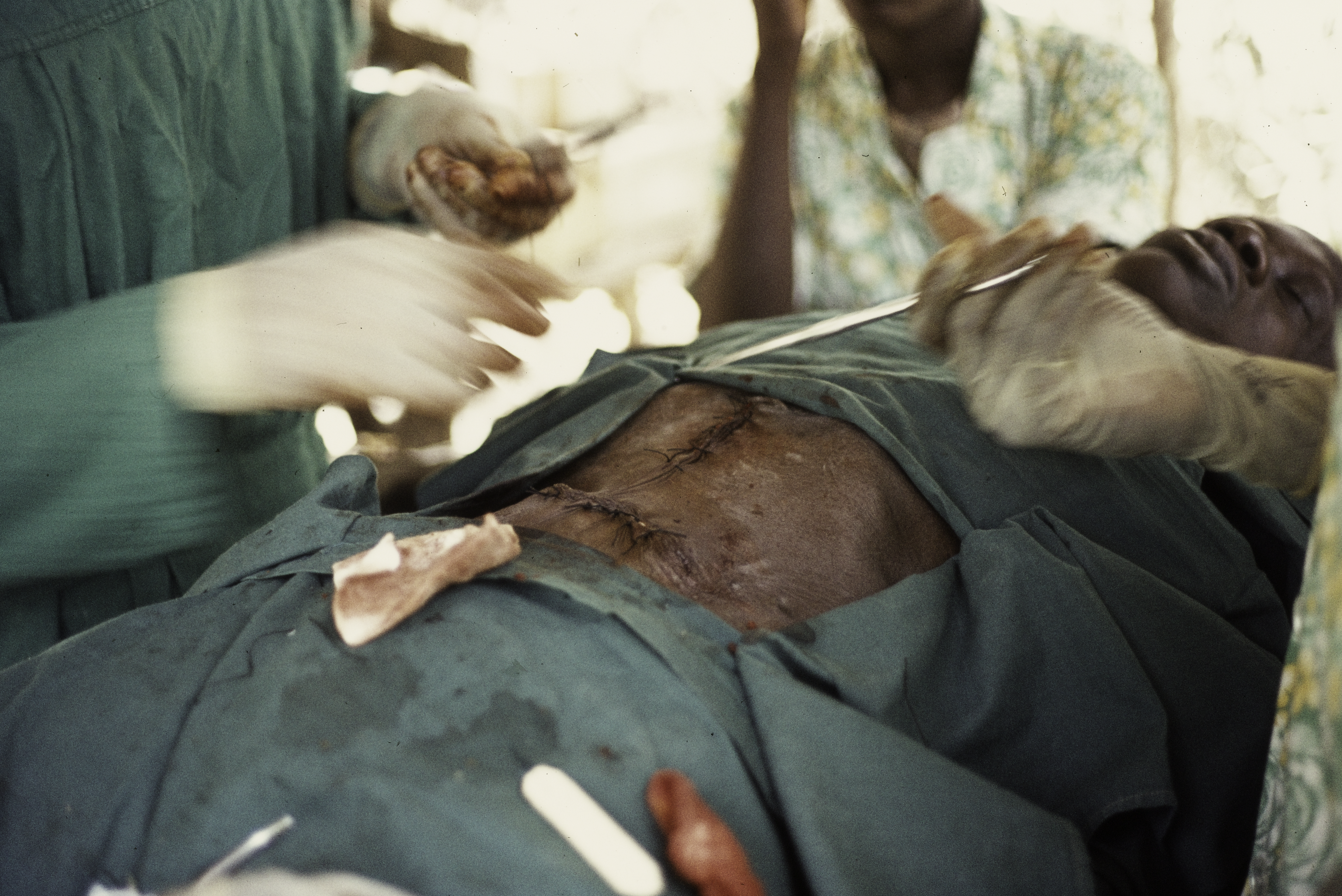
Suturing two operation wounds with eleven simple stitches

Many different techniques exist. The most common is the simple interrupted stitch; it is indeed the simplest to perform and is called "interrupted" because the suture thread is cut between each individual stitch. The vertical and horizontal mattress stitch are also interrupted but are more complex and specialized for everting the skin and distributing tension. The running or continuous stitch is quicker but risks failing if the suture is cut in just one place; the continuous locking stitch is in some ways a more secure version. The chest drain stitch and corner stitch are variations of the horizontal mattress.

Other stitches or suturing techniques include:

- Purse-string suture, a continuous, circular inverting suture which is made to secure apposition of the edges of a surgical or traumatic wound.
- Figure-of-eight stitch
- Subcuticular stitch. A continuous suture where the needle enters and exits the epidermis along the plane of the skin. This stitch is for approximating superficial skin edges and provides the best cosmetic result. Superficial gapping wounds may be reduced effectively by using continuous subcuticular sutures. It is unclear whether subcuticular sutures can reduce the rate of surgical site infections when compared with other suturing methods.

=== Placement ===
Sutures are placed by mounting a needle with attached suture into a needle holder. The needle point is pressed into the flesh, advanced along the trajectory of the needle's curve until it emerges, and pulled through. The trailing thread is then tied into a knot, usually a square knot or surgeon's knot. Ideally, sutures bring together the wound edges, without causing indenting or blanching of the skin, since the blood supply may be impeded and thus increase infection and scarring. Ideally, sutured skin rolls slightly outward from the wound (eversion), and the depth and width of the sutured flesh is roughly equal. Placement varies based on the location.

=== Stitching interval and spacing ===
Skin and other soft tissue can lengthen significantly under strain. To accommodate this lengthening, continuous stitches must have an adequate amount of slack. Jenkin's rule was the first research result in this area, showing that the then-typical use of a suture-length to wound-length ratio of 2:1 increased the risk of a burst wound, and suggesting a SL:WL ratio of 4:1 or more in abdominal wounds. A later study suggested 6:1 as the optimal ratio in abdominal closure.

=== Layers ===
In contrast to single layer suturing, two layer suturing generally involves suturing at a deeper level of a tissue followed by another layer of suturing at a more superficial level. For example, Cesarean section can be performed with single or double layer suturing of the uterine incision.

=== Removal ===
Whereas some sutures are intended to be permanent, and others in specialized cases may be kept in place for an extended period of many weeks, as a rule sutures are a short-term device to allow healing of a trauma or wound.

Different parts of the body heal at different speeds. Common time to remove stitches will vary: facial wounds 3–5 days; scalp wound 7–10 days; limbs 10–14 days; joints 14 days; trunk of the body 7–10 days.

Removal of sutures is traditionally achieved by using forceps to hold the suture thread steady and pointed scalpel blades or scissors to cut. For practical reasons the two instruments (forceps and scissors) are available in a sterile kit. In certain countries (e.g. US), these kits are available in sterile disposable trays because of the high cost of cleaning and re-sterilization.

=== Expansions ===
A pledgeted suture is one that is supported by a pledget, that is, a small flat non-absorbent pad normally composed of polytetrafluoroethylene, used as buttresses under sutures when there is a possibility of sutures tearing through tissue.

== Tissue adhesives ==
Topical cyanoacrylate adhesives (closely related to super glue), have been used in combination with, or as an alternative to, sutures in wound closure. The adhesive remains liquid until exposed to water or water-containing substances/tissue, after which it cures (polymerizes) and forms a bond to the underlying surface. The tissue adhesive has been shown to act as a barrier to microbial penetration as long as the adhesive film remains intact. Limitations of tissue adhesives include contraindications to use near the eyes and a mild learning curve on correct usage. They are also unsuitable for oozing or potentially contaminated wounds.

In surgical incisions it does not work as well as sutures as the wounds often break open.

Cyanoacrylate is the generic name for cyanoacrylate based fast-acting glues such as methyl-2-cyanoacrylate, ethyl-2-cyanoacrylate (commonly sold under trade names like Superglue and Krazy Glue) and n-butyl-cyanoacrylate. Skin glues like Indermil and Histoacryl were the first medical grade tissue adhesives to be used, and these are composed of n-butyl cyanoacrylate. These worked well but had the disadvantage of having to be stored in the refrigerator, were exothermic so they stung the patient, and the bond was brittle. Nowadays, the longer chain polymer, 2-octyl cyanoacrylate, is the preferred medical grade glue. It is available under various trade names, such as LiquiBand, SurgiSeal, FloraSeal, and Dermabond. These have the advantages of being more flexible, making a stronger bond, and being easier to use. The longer side chain types, for example octyl and butyl forms, also reduce tissue reaction.

== History ==
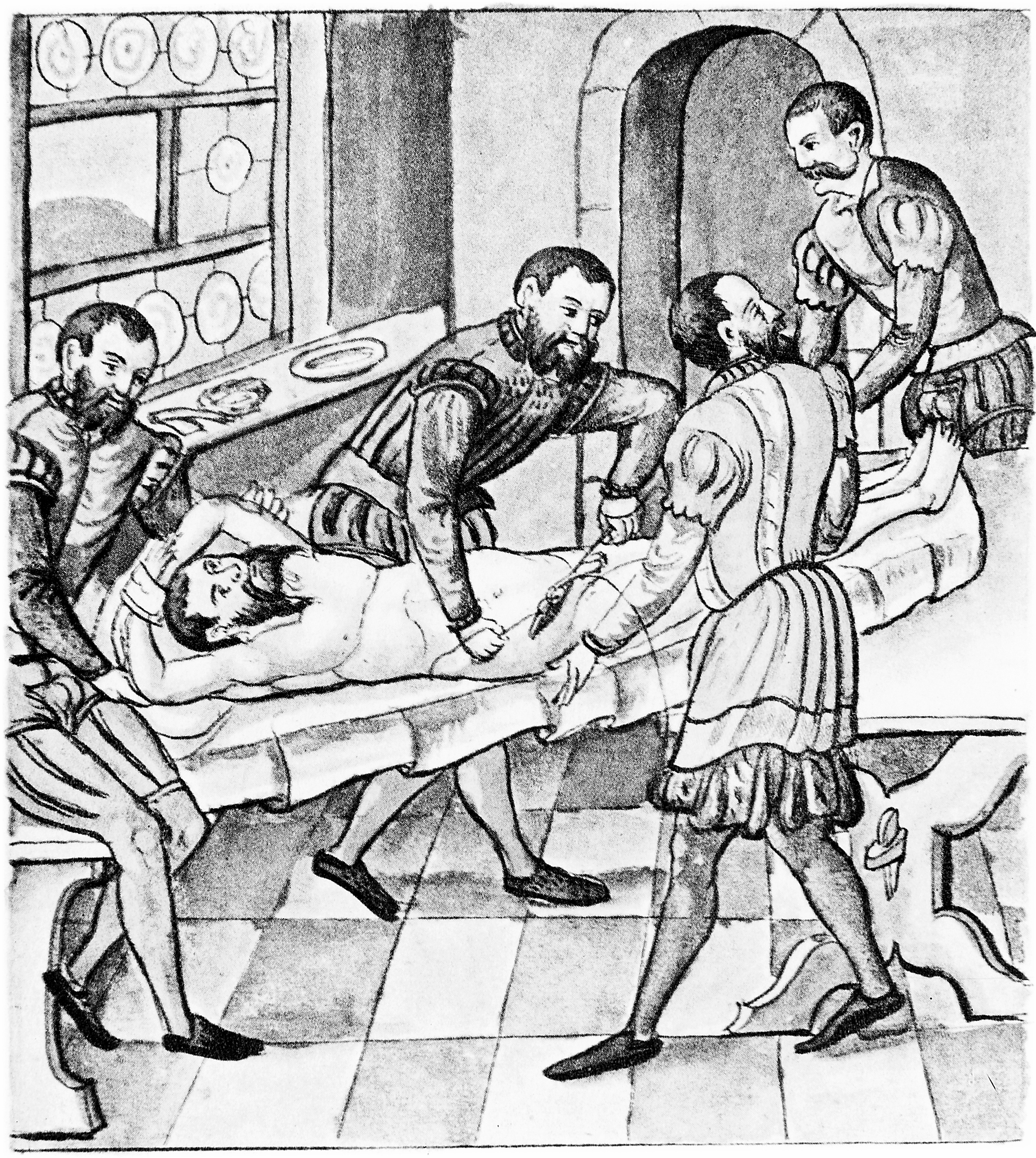
Sewing wound after herniotomy, 1559

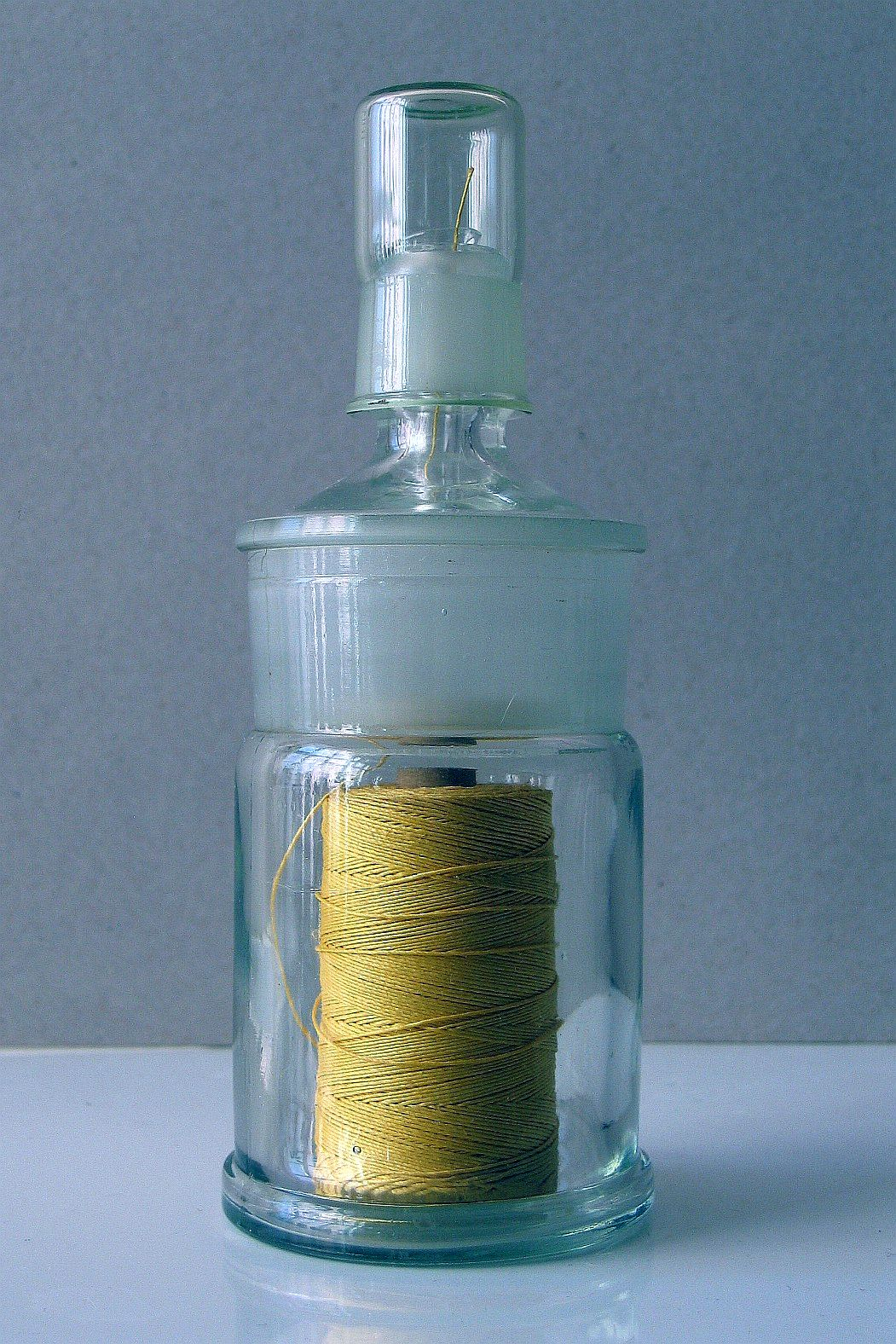
Old refillable surgical thread supplier (middle of 20th century)

Through many millennia, various suture materials were used or proposed. Needles were made of bone or metals such as silver, copper, and aluminium bronze wire. Sutures were made of plant materials (flax, hemp and cotton) or animal material (hair, tendons, arteries, muscle strips and nerves, silk, and catgut).

The earliest reports of surgical suture date to 3000 BC in ancient Egypt, and the oldest known suture is in a mummy from 1100 BC. A detailed description of a wound suture and the suture materials used in it is by the Indian sage and physician Sushruta, written in 500 BC. The Greek father of medicine, Hippocrates, described suture techniques, as did the later Roman Aulus Cornelius Celsus. The 2nd-century Roman physician Galen described sutures made of surgical gut or catgut. In the 10th century, the catgut suture along with the surgery needle were used in operations by Abulcasis. The gut suture was similar to that of strings for violins, guitars, and tennis racquets and it involved harvesting sheep or cow intestines. Catgut sometimes led to infection due to a lack of disinfection and sterilization of the material.

Joseph Lister endorsed the routine sterilization of all suture threads. He first attempted sterilization with the 1860s "carbolic catgut", and chromic catgut followed two decades later. Sterile catgut was finally achieved in 1906 with iodine treatment.

The next great leap came in the twentieth century. The chemical industry drove production of the first synthetic thread in the early 1930s, which exploded into production of numerous absorbable and non-absorbable synthetics. The first synthetic absorbable was based on polyvinyl alcohol in 1931. Polyesters were developed in the 1950s, and later the process of radiation sterilization was established for catgut and polyester. Polyglycolic acid was discovered in the 1960s and implemented in the 1970s. Today, most sutures are made of synthetic polymer fibers. Silk and, rarely, gut sutures are the only materials still in use from ancient times. In fact, gut sutures have been banned in Europe and Japan owing to concerns regarding bovine spongiform encephalopathy. Silk suture is still used today, mainly to secure surgical drains.

== See also ==
- Alexis Carrel – French surgeon and biologist (1873–1944)
- Barbed suture – Type of knotless surgical suture
- Butterfly closure – Small self-adhesive medical dressing
- Cheesewiring – Cutting of tissue by a taut element
- Chitin – Long-chain polymer of a N-acetylglucosamine
- Cyanoacrylate – Type of fast-acting adhesive
- Knot – Method of fastening or securing linear materials
- Ligature – Piece of thread (suture) tied around an anatomical structure
- Outline of medicine – Diagnosis, treatment, and prevention of illness
- Sewing – Craft of joining fabrics with a needle and thread
- Surgical staple – Staples used in surgery in place of sutures
- Wound closure strip – Porous surgical tape used for closing small wounds
