= Cheesewiring =

Cutting of tissue by a taut element

In medicine, the term cheesewiring or cheesewire effect (used interchangeably) describes any process in which cells or intercellular matrix are dissected or extruded either by the material being pressed through a taut element, or by the tension of a taut element pulling through tissue. The procedure is typically conducted in a surgical setting.

Cheesewiring or the cheesewire effect can also describe the process of suture material cutting or tearing through viscera at the time of suture anastomosis and tension.

== As a complication ==
Cheesewiring can be a complication or part of a negative outcome of a procedure. Examples include tumor growth penetrating the openings in a bowel stent that was placed to open an obstructed bowel, sutures used to hold a transplanted cornea in place, and treatment of tendon rupture, when sutures pull through the tendon.

Evidence that the cheesewire effect has occurred is most clearly seen after surgery has been completed. Postoperatively as wound margins begin to swell, a suture can drag through the thin portion of tissue present near the surface. This suture drag is most often the result of tension being reduced in tying or placing the suture. It is apparent that cheesewiring has occurred if the suture has moved a little closer to the insertion site. A tell tale Y-shaped scar is evidence that cheesewiring has taken place. Cheesewiring that causes drag can lead to damage to tissue and make a surgeon tug on the material, leading to suture pullout. This causes an increased procedure time for the surgeon as well as a prolonged recovery period for the patient.

Cheesewire complications are most often seen in cornea surgeries due to the soft tissue present in the eye. One of the most common occurrences is cheese wiring of the puncta occurring during intubation. This can occur for many different reasons. One cause is excessive tension on the tubing. Cheesewiring can also occur late as scar tissue forms around the tubing. The scar tissue fixes the tube in place and prevents the movement in the canalicular system with each blink creating problems. The tubing must be removed if cheesewiring is greater than 3 mm.

=== Technique for removal of the cheesewire suture ===
Whether intentional or non-intentionally occurring, a cheesewire suture can be removed in surgery. A cheesewire suture is removed by a small incision made in the conjunctiva overlying the two ends of the suture. Fine removal suture forceps are used to grasp both ends of the suture. Tangential traction is then used to cheesewire through the scar tissue

There are many complications that can arise from the removal of the cheesewire suture. In the eye specifically, suture breaking can result in significant tissue scarring. This results in a large amount of traction force required to remove the suture. Occular Hypotony and hyphema following the removal of cheesewire sutures are also common occurrences.

=== Reducing suture drag ===
Surgeons can take several precautions to help decrease the probability of cheesewiring occurring. One technique determined to decrease suture drag is placement of the needle perpendicularly through the entire corneal thickness encompassed by the suture bite on each side of the incision. Certain sutures are also more prone to cheesewiring. 3-0 Vicryl is one of the least likely sutures to experience cheesewiring. Sutures may also be coated in materials to reduce tissue drag. Monofilament sutures create less drag while passing through tissue, but may decrease tensile strength and cause crimping. Therefore, multifilament sutures are more commonly used to prevent the occurrence of cheesewiring despite a decrease in mechanical properties

Factors such as the type and size of the needle, suture type and thickness, and suture placement should all be considered as all factors have a significant effect on the surgical result. For instance, having a suture that is too short can lead to inflammation in tissue, while a suture that is too tight can cause necrosis, especially in association with significant edema.

== As an intentional procedure ==
The term cheesewiring can also be used to name the process of using a guidewire or suture intentionally to cut through tissue during a surgical procedure or allowing a suture to slowly cut through tissue over time. Examples of cheesewiring used intentionally include treating fistulas, use in trabeculectomies, and to aid in endovascular aortic repair.

=== Cheesewiring as used in treatment of a fistula ===
Treatment of fistulas often involves placing a suture and allowing it to cut off the fistula over time.

=== Cheesewiring as used in a trabeculectomy ===
Cheesewiring is used as an intentional procedure in a trabeculectomy. In a trabecuiectomy, a loop of 8-0 nylon sutures is placed under the scleral flap. The cheesewiring suture allows rescuing failing or failed bleb, by mechanically breaking down the subscleral flap.

In this procedure, a triangular partial thickness scleral flap is created using a diamond knife. The scleral flap is then extended to the limbus that is hinged anteriorly. A sclerotomy is then made with a punch followed by a peripheral iridectomy. An 8-0 nylon suture is then passed through the conjunctiva from the external aspect into the subconjunctival space. This process creates the cheesewiring effect. The needle is entered 3 mm (0.12 in) from the lateral edge of the future bleb site and 3–4 mm (0.12–0.16 in) away from the limbus. The 8-0 nylon suture is taken under the scleral flap. Once this happens, the suture is reversed and the needle is passed through the conjunctiva from the inside towards the outside position. A singular 10-0 vicryl suture can secure the scleral flap and then the cheesewire suture can then be cut flush to the conjunctiva. The conjunctiva flap can be then secured with 26 10-0 vicryl sutures at either end of the limbus. A single 10-0 vicryl mattress suture can be placed in the middle. This entire process allows for blebs to be rescued.

=== Cheesewiring as to aid in endovascular aortic valve repair ===
Cheesewiring is commonly used in the endovascular repair. The cheesewire technique can be used to fenestrate an intimal flap, alleviating malperfusion in aortic dissection. Pulling both ends of a guide wire in a caudally sawing motion down through the infrarenal neck and into the aneurysm sac completes the technique. This process shears the flap with minimal damage.

== See also ==
- Surgical suture
- List of medical topics
- Cheese knife
- Ligature (medicine)
