= Ligature (medicine) =

Piece of thread (suture) tied around an anatomical structure

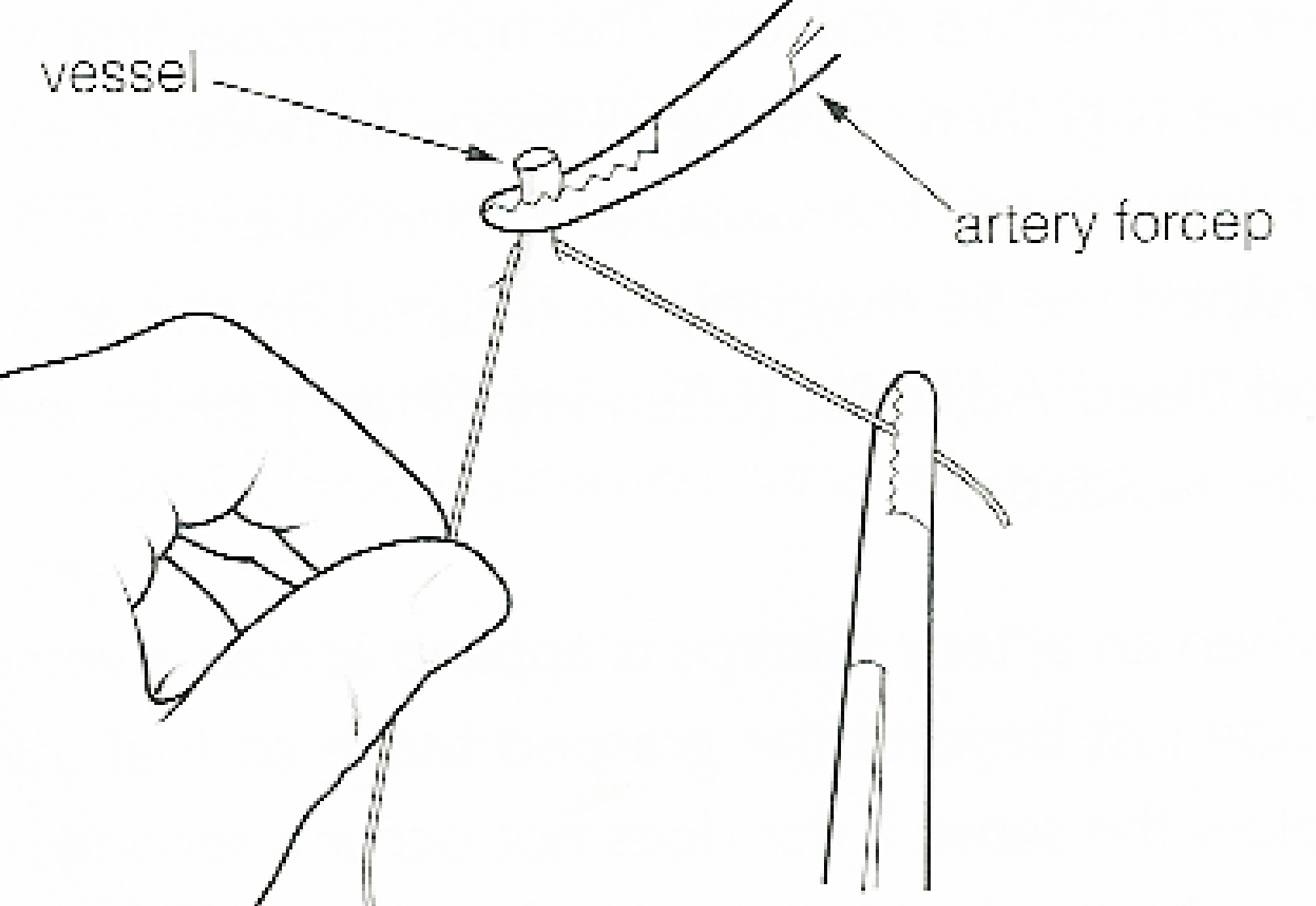
Visual demonstration

In surgery or medical procedure, a ligature consists of a piece of thread (suture) tied around an anatomical structure, usually a blood vessel, another hollow structure (e.g. urethra), or an accessory skin tag to shut it off.

== History ==
The principle of ligation is attributed to Hippocrates and Galen. In ancient Rome, ligatures were used to treat hemorrhoids. Spanish Muslim doctor Al-Zahrawi described the procedure around the year 1000 in his book Kitab al-Tasrif. The concept of a ligature was reintroduced some 500 years later by Ambroise Paré and first performed by him in the village of Damvillers. It finally found its modern use in 1870–1880, made popular by Jules-Émile Péan.

== Procedure ==
With a blood vessel, the surgeon will clamp the vessel perpendicular to the axis of the artery or vein with a hemostat, then secure it by ligating it, i.e., using a piece of suture around it before dividing the structure and releasing the hemostat. It is different from a tourniquet in that the tourniquet will not be secured by knots and it can therefore be released/tightened at will.

Ligation is one of the remedies to treat skin tags (acrochorda). It is done by tying string such as dental floss around the acrochordon to cut off the blood circulation. Home remedies include commercial ligation bands that can be placed around the base of skin tags.

Complications of ligation in polydactyly treatment include infection, neuroma or cyst formation.

== See also ==
- Elastrator
- Surgical suture
- Cheesewiring
