= Simple interrupted stitch =

Suturing technique

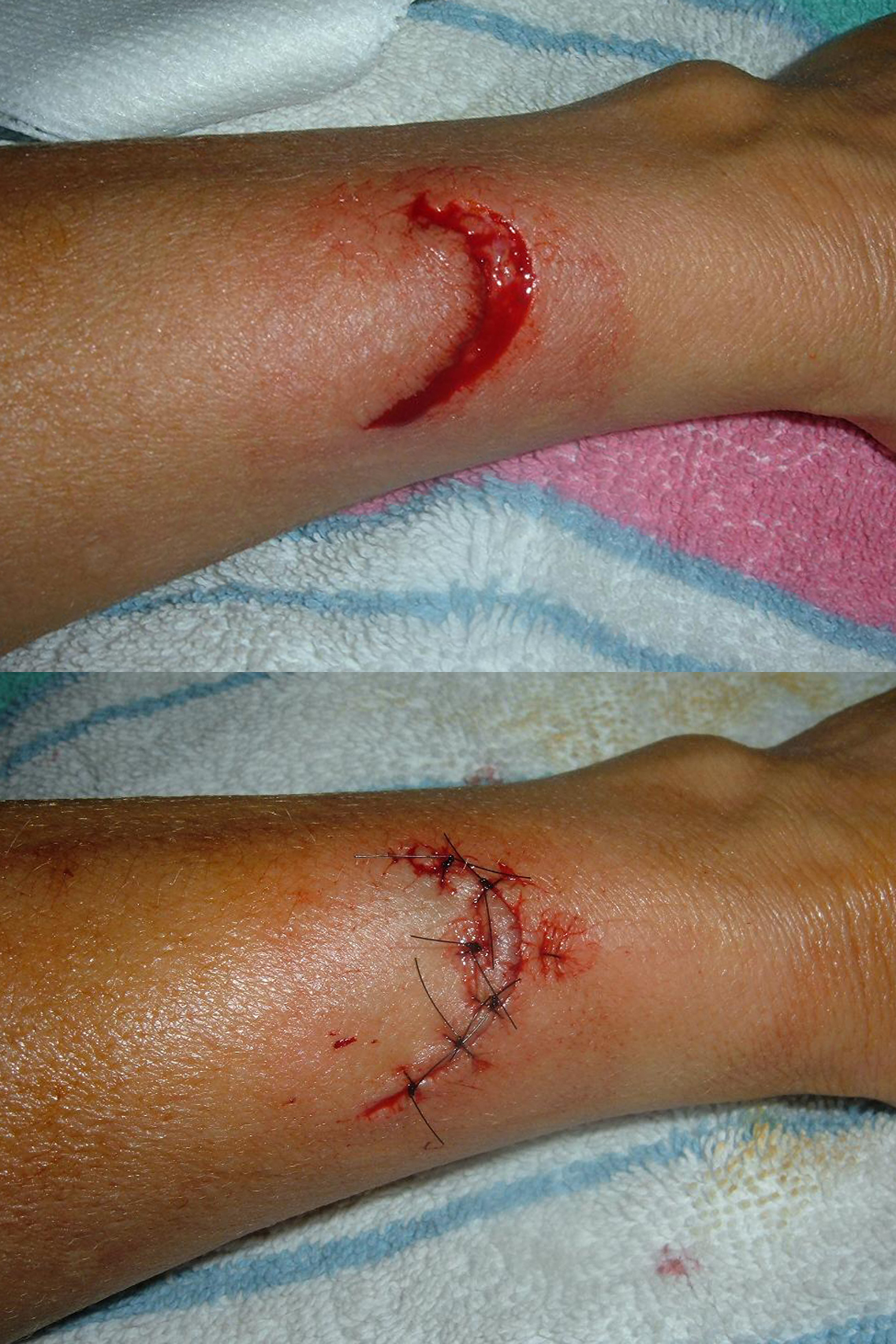
A wound before and after being closed by simple interrupted sutures, but with a central vertical mattress suture

The simple interrupted stitch is a suturing technique used to close wounds. It is the most commonly used technique in the closure of skin. It is known as an interrupted stitch because the individual stitches are not connected; they are separate. Placing and tying each stitch individually is time-consuming, but this technique keeps the wound together even if one suture fails. It is simple, and relatively easy to place. A surgeon's knot or knots cross the wound perpendicularly. The knots should not be left over the wound, but placed to one side in order to avoid scarring and to make the removal of the stitches easier.

Procedure

== Uses ==
The simple interrupted stitch can be chosen for most wound types, and it is typically faster and more cost effective than other laceration repair techniques. This is most often useful for superficial lacerations, or for the final layer for deep lacerations. Examples of uses include repair of lacerations in the skin of the face, scalp, trunk, or extremities, or of mucosal surfaces (oral, lips, or genitalia).

Stitching is not recommended for bite wounds (cat, dog, human, etc.)

The simple interrupted technique can be done with absorbable or non-absorbable suture material. See Surgical suture for selection of suture material and for referencing types of stitches. This is determined based on evaluation of wound for mechanism, depth, tension, and ultimate cosmetic goals.

== Technique ==
The simple interrupted stitch begins with introduction of the needle into the skin on one side of the wound. It is done perpendicular to the laceration, and the needle tip should be placed at 90 degrees to the skin. The needle then will pass through the deeper tissues to ultimately pass through to come out of the skin on the other side of the wound. Ideally, the wound edges should be everted. The suture is then tied with a square knot (see surgeon's knots). Lastly, the knots should be positioned to the same side of the wound.

== Advantages and Disadvantages ==
The simple interrupted stitch has the advantage of a better chance for cosmetically desirable results in comparison with other techniques. This is because the use of individual stitches allows the provider to closely approximate borders of the laceration. They also have the advantage of decreased risk of reduced circulation to the surrounding skin, as well as great tensile strength. In the case of infection or other circumstance, you also have the flexibility of removing one stitch at a time. This is in contrast to a running stitch, which, once cut, is completely unraveled.

At the same time, a disadvantage of the simple interrupted stitch is that it is time-consuming to remove, as each stitch must be removed individually.
