= Horizontal mattress stitch =

Suture technique

Overhead view. Dashed lines are under the skin.

The horizontal mattress stitch is a suture technique used to close wounds. It everts skin well and spreads tension along the wound edge. This makes it ideal for holding together fragile skin as well as skin under high tension such as the distant edges of a large laceration or as the initial holding suture in complicated repairs.

The horizontal mattress is so secure that it can compromise blood supply to the tissue contained within the stitch. This can be helpful to prevent wound bleeding, but it can cause strangulation and skin necrosis if tied too tightly. Sometimes cushioning materials can be placed within the stitch to mitigate this effect. Like other mattress stitches, the horizontal mattress can sometimes leave small skin scars called "railroad marks;" for this reason it is rarely used on the face, and is removed promptly even when placed elsewhere. The knot is parallel adjacent to the wound edge.

A variation of the horizontal mattress stitch is the figure-of-eight suture. Instead of turning the needle around, the second simple bights are in the same direction as the first. Like the horizontal mattress stitch, it is useful for skin under high tension. It also has the benefit of helping with hemostasis.
