= Catgut suture =

Type of surgical suture

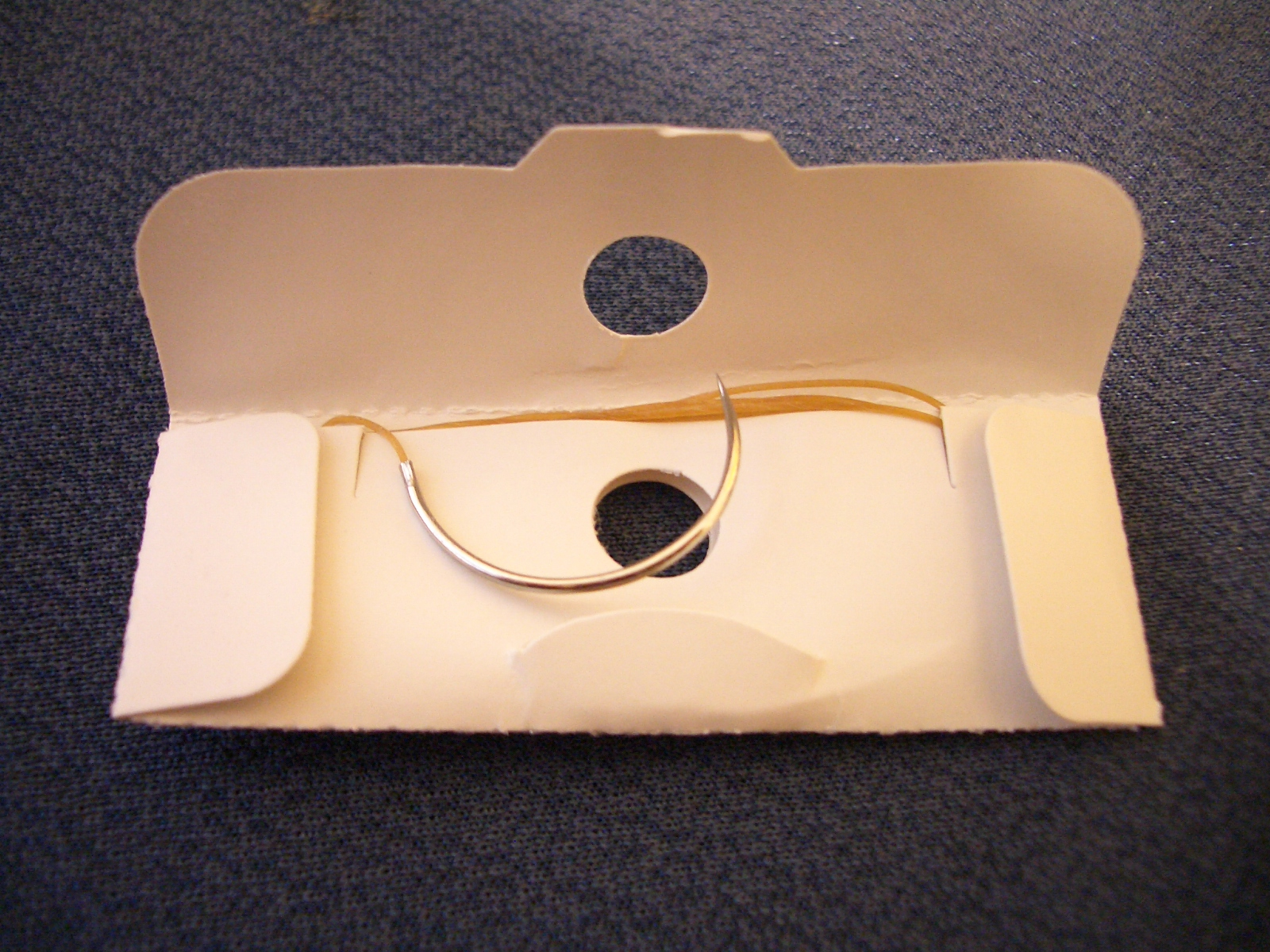
Surgical suture on needle holders

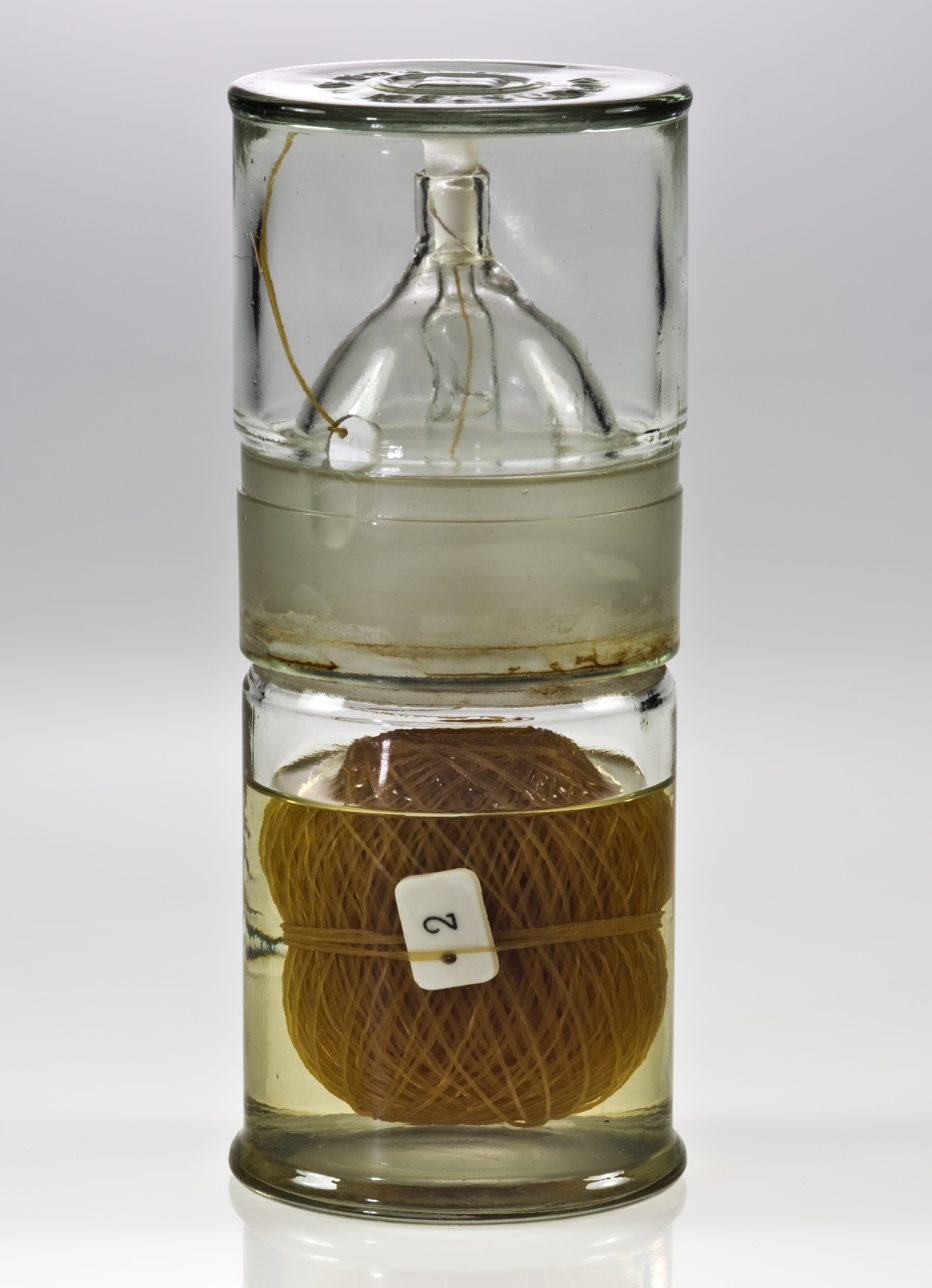
Catgut suture in a vintage glass dispenser

Catgut suture is a type of surgical suture made of twisted strands of purified collagen taken from the small intestine of domesticated ruminants or beef tendon. It is naturally degraded by the body's own proteolytic enzymes. Full tensile strength remains for at least 7 days, and absorption is complete by 90 days. This eventual disintegration makes it good for use in rapidly healing tissues and in internal structures that cannot be re-accessed for suture removal.

Catgut suture has excellent handling features, high knot-pull tensile strength, and good knot security. It is used for all surgical procedures including general closure, ophthalmic, orthopedics, obstetrics/gynecology and gastrointestinal surgery. It is absorbed faster in patients with cancer, anemia, and malnutrition. It also absorbed faster when used in the mouth and the vagina, due to the presence of microorganisms.

Catgut has largely been replaced in non-absorbable applications, first by silk, then various synthetic materials; in absorbable use it has been superseded by such synthetic polymers as Vicryl and polydioxanone. It is not used at all for human surgery in some countries. In Europe and Japan, gut sutures have been banned due to concerns that they could transmit bovine spongiform encephalopathy (mad-cow disease), although the herds from which gut is harvested are certified BSE-free.

== Manufacture ==
Catgut suture is made by twisting together strands of purified collagen taken from the serosal or submucosal layer of the small intestine of healthy ruminants (cattle, sheep, goats) or from beef tendon. The natural plain thread is approximately 90% collagen. it is precision ground in order to achieve a monofilament character, and treated with a glycerol-containing solution. The suture is sterilized with a sterilizing fluid containing ethylene oxide, isopropyl alcohol and distilled water. Catgut suture is straw-colored, and is available in sizes USP 6-0 (1 metric) to USP 3 (7 metric).

Although the name implies the usage of guts of cats, there is no record of feline guts being used for this purpose. The word catgut is derived from the term kitgut or kitstring (the string used on a kit, or fiddle). Misinterpretation of the word kit as referring to a young cat may have led to the use of the term catgut. Perhaps another possible explanation of the name is the combination of the words cattle and gut.

B Braun Medical AG, a German manufacturer, first industrialized catgut suture; Catgut is a brand registered of the company.

== Variants ==
Catgut Chrome (B Braun) suture is a variant treated with chromic acid salts. This treatment produces roughly twice the stitch-holding time of plain catgut, but greater tissue inflammation occurs. Full tensile strength is extended to 18–21 days. It is brown rather than straw-colored, and has improved smoothness due to the dry presentation of the thread (plain catgut is wet). It is otherwise similar to plain catgut.

"Fast catgut" suture is heat-treated to give even more rapid absorption in the body.

== History ==
Gut strings were being used in surgery as medical sutures as early as the 3rd century AD as Galen, a prominent Greek physician from the Roman Empire, is known to have used them.

Al-Zahrawi (936–1013) was the first to use catgut for internal stitches.
