= Ukrainian Grey =

Ukrainian breed of cattle

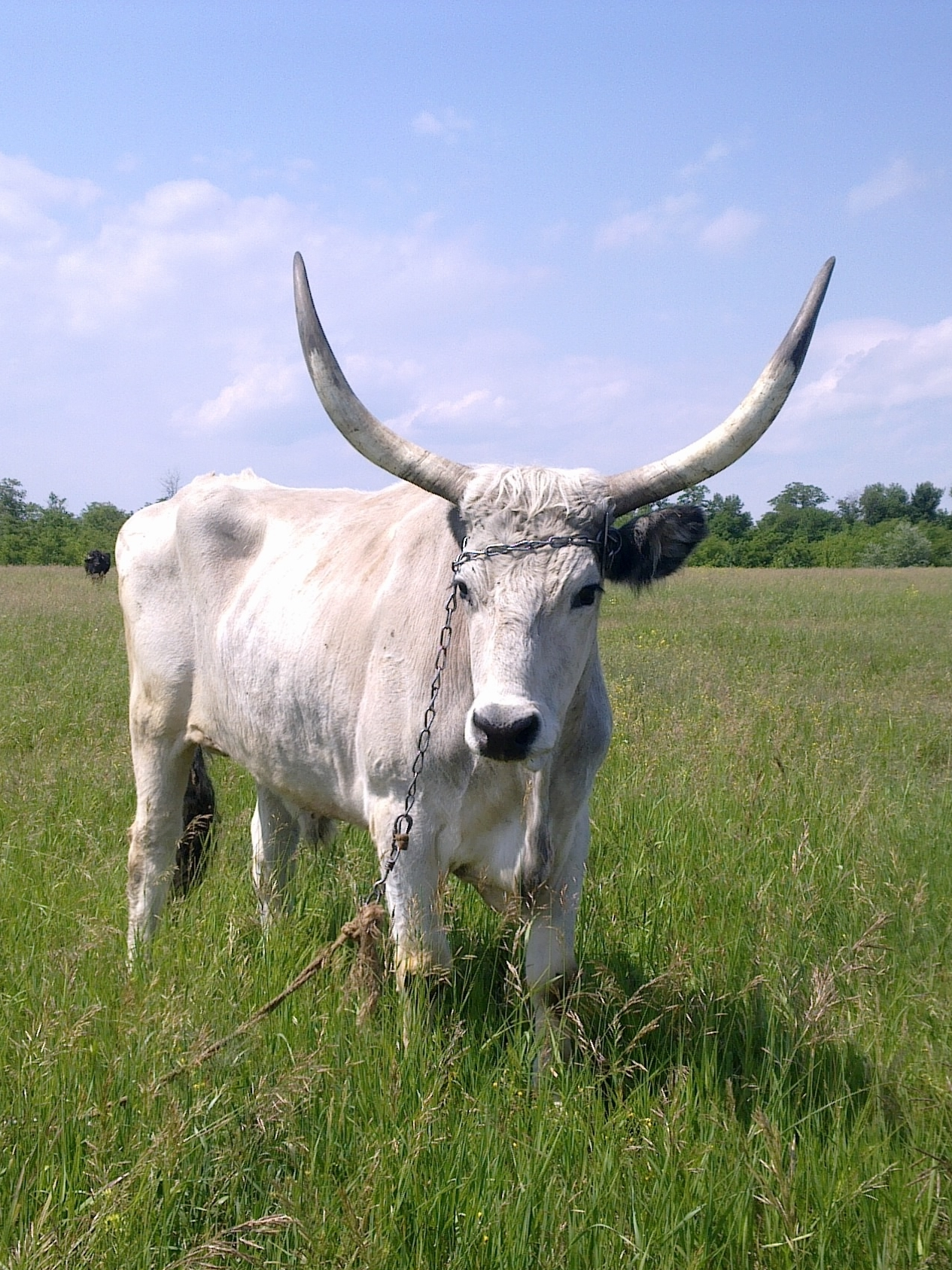
- In Cherkasy Oblast
- Conservation status: FAO (2007): critically endangered; DAD-IS (2023): at risk/endangered
- Other names: Сіра українська порода, sira ukrayin'ska; Ukrainian Steppe; Malorussian; Cherkassian; Black Sea
- Country of origin: Ukraine
- Distribution: Ukraine

Traits
- Weight: Male: 900–1050 kg; Female: 580–610 kg
- Height: Male: 137 cm; Female: 129 cm
- Coat: grey, darker on foreparts
- Horn status: lyre-shaped, long

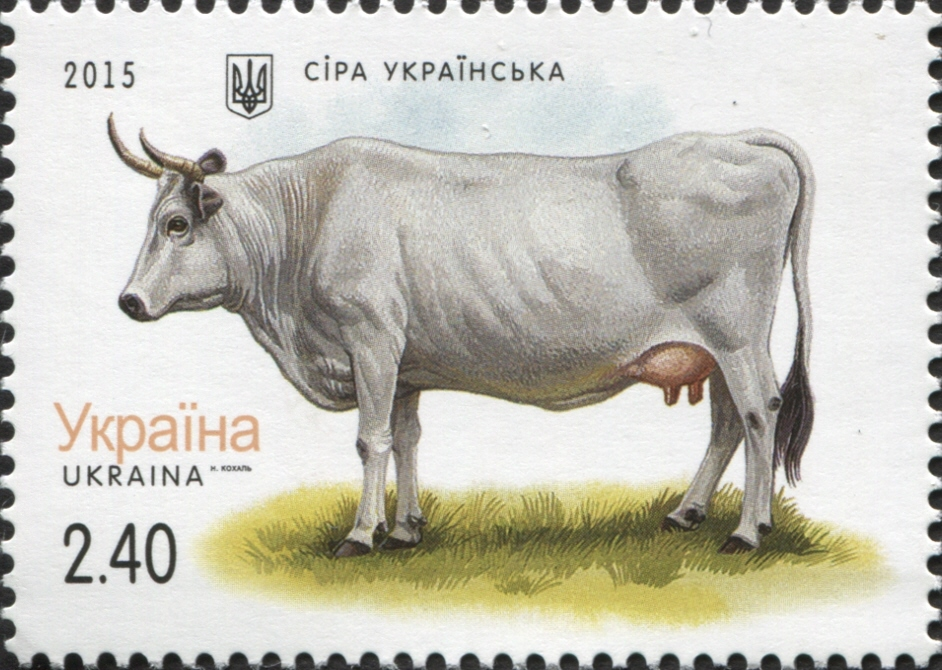
Illustration on a postage stamp

The Ukrainian Grey (Ukrainian: Сіра українська порода, sira ukrayin'ska) is an ancient Ukrainian breed of Podolian cattle. It is a hardy breed, and was traditionally used both for meat and for draught power. It is similar to other steppe Podolian cattle breeds such as the Hungarian Grey and the Italian Podolica.

== History ==
The Ukrainian Grey has been shown by studies of microsatellite data to be a very ancient one, as are some other related breeds of Grey Steppe cattle, such as the Serbian Steppe. Until the beginning of the 20th century, the Ukrainian Grey was the principal cattle breed of Ukraine. It was hardy, frugal, and well adapted to the steppe environment, and was used principally as a draught animal; when heavy horses began to replace oxen in agriculture in the 19th century, the breed started to decline. A herd book was started in 1935, when it represented about 6.4% of the total cattle population in Ukraine.

A conservation programme was begun in the 1960s, and two conservation herds were established, one at Polivanovka in Dnipropetrovsk Oblast and another at Askania-Nova in Kherson Oblast; in 1982, a small herd of 125 animals was moved from Askania-Nova to Cherga in the Altai Republic. Since 1980, the estimated population reported has usually been around 1000 head, with a high of 1500 in 1990 and a low of 700 in 2004. In 2007, the conservation status of the breed was listed by the FAO as "critical". In 2011, the total number in three conservation herds was 1188, with 32 bulls and 440 breeding cows. The Ukrainian Grey is included in the Ark of Taste of the Slow Food Foundation.

== Characteristics ==
In this primitive breed, both cows and bulls have horns, as well as grey hides, which are their namesake.

== Use ==
In the Soviet era of Ukrainian history, the Ukrainian Grey was much used for cross-breeding with other breeds. It contributed to the Lebedin, the Red Steppe, and the Ukrainian Simmental. The extinct Malakan breed of Turkey derived from the Ukrainian Grey.
