= Auspitz =

Auspitz is a Jewish surname. Notable people with this name include:

- Auguste Auspitz-Kolar (1844–1878), Austrian pianist and composer
- Heinrich Auspitz (1835–1886), Moravian-Austrian dermatologist
- Gábor Péter (born Benjámin Auspitz,1906–1993), Hungarian politician
- Leopold Auspitz (1838–1907), Austrian k.k. Major general and writer
- Ludwig Auspitz (1859–1917), German theater actor and opera singer
- Moritz Auspitz (1803–1880), Austrian surgeon
- Oliver Auspitz (born 1975), Austrian film producer
- Rudolf Auspitz (1837–1906), Austrian industrialist, economist, politician, and banker

== See also ==
- Auspitz's sign, named after Heinrich Auspitz
- Palais Lieben-Auspitz, Vienna
- Hustopeče, a Moravian town called Auspitz in German
