= Archives of Dermatological Research =

- Discipline: Dermatology
- Language: English
- Edited by: Murad Alam

Publication details
- Former names: Archiv für Dermatologie und Syphilis; Archiv für klinische und experimentelle Dermatologie und Syphilis; Archiv für Dermatologische Forschung
- History: 1869–present
- Publisher: Springer Science+Business Media
- Frequency: 10/year
- Open access: Hybrid
- Impact factor: 3.0 (2022)

Standard abbreviations
- ISO 4: Arch. Dermatol. Res.

Indexing
- CODEN: ADREDL
- ISSN: 0340-3696 (print); 1432-069X (web)
- OCLC no.: 03955287

Links
- Journal homepage; Online archive

Archives of Dermatological Research, published by Springer Science+Business Media, is a peer-reviewed medical journal that focuses on skin disease. It was established as the Archiv für Dermatologie und Syphilis in 1869 by Heinrich Auspitz and Philipp Josef Pick. Springer acquired the journal in 1921 and renamed it the Archiv für klinische und experimentelle Dermatologie und Syphilis. In the 1950s it followed the general trend to drop its link to sexually transmitted infections in its title. It became the Archiv für Dermatologische Forschung in 1971 before obtaining its current name in 1975.

Other past editors have included Albert Neisser, Josef Jadassohn, Erich Hoffmann, and Enno Christophers. Its current editor-in-chief is Murad Alam (Northwestern University).

== Publication ==
The Archives of Dermatological Research is a dermatological journal, published by Springer Science+Business Media. The editor-in-chief is Murad Alam (Northwestern University).

== Origins and early history ==
In mid-19th century German-speaking parts of Europe, the specialties of venereology and dermatology were beginning to be associated with each other, particularly as syphilis presented with signs and symptoms in skin. (Note: Dermatologists were generally the early specialists in venerology.) As a result, in 1869, the Austrian dermatologists Heinrich Auspitz and Philipp Josef Pick established the Archiv für Dermatologie und Syphilis. A significant amount of work involved syphilis so it was included in the title. It was published in German, in Prague. In 1874 it changed to being published four times a year under the name Vierteljahresschrift für Dermatologie und Syphilis, and returned to its original name in 1889. Auspitz and Pick both co-edited the journal until Auspitz's death in 1886, after which Pick carried on with it. Other early co-editors included Albert Neisser. The Japanese dermatologist Keizo Dohi published his first paper in the journal in German.

== Twentieth century ==
Springer-Verlag took over the journal's publishing in 1921, when it became the Archiv für klinische und experimentelle Dermatologie und Syphilis. For the next 52 years it was an official publication for the Deutsche Dermatologische Gesellschaft. Issues were suspended in 1944 after Volume 185. Its publication recommenced in 1948 with Volume 186, its editors then being Erich Hoffmann, Georg Alexander Rost, and Fritz Hussels.

By the mid-1950s, following the widespread availability of penicillin to treat syphilis, the disease appeared to be under control and considered by dermatologists to no longer be a concern. Subsequently, dermatologists found a way of separating themselves from sexually transmitted infections and the unpopular specialty of venereology. In 1955, links to sexually transmitted infection including syphilis were dropped from the titles of several journals including the Archiv für klinische und experimentelle Dermatologie und Syphilis, which was renamed Archiv für klinische und experimentelle Dermatologie. In the same year the American Medical Association (AMA) Archives of Dermatology and Syphilology also dropped syphilis and became AMA Archives of Dermatology, and the Indian Journal of Dermatology and Venereology removed venerology from its title to form the Indian Journal of Dermatology.

Between 1970 and 1975 the journal was renamed the Archiv für Dermatologische Forschung. Enno Christophers became its editor in 1971 and continued in that post when in 1975 the journal became the Archives of Dermatological Research.

== Past editors ==
Former editors include:

- Enno Christophers (appointed in 1971)
- Gunter W. Korting (1965–1970)
- Otto Braun-Falco (1965–1970)
- Josef Kimmig (1964–1970)
- Oscar Gans (1951–1969)
- Alfred Marchionini (1949–1965)
- Walther Schonfeld (1946–1969)
- Georg Alexander Rost (1946–1955)
- Fritz Hussels (1946–1949)
- Erich Hoffmann (1946–1955)
- Karl Zieler (1936–1944)
- Guido Miescher (1936–1961)
- Svend Lomholt (1936–1939)
- Ernst Heinrich Brill (1936–1944)
- Leopold Arzt (1936–1938)
- Leo von Zumbusch (1933–1936)
- Walter Friboes (1933–1944)
- Walther Pick (until 1931)
- Josef Jadassohn (until 1936)
- Albert Neisser
- Philipp Josef Pick (from 1869)
- Heinrich Auspitz (from 1869 until his death in 1886)

== Abstracting and indexing ==
The journal is abstracted and indexed in:

- Biological Abstracts
- BIOSIS Previews
- CAB Abstracts
- Chemical Abstracts Service
- Current Contents/Life Sciences
- EBSCO databases
- Embase
- Index Medicus/MEDLINE/PubMed
- Science Citation Index Expanded
- Scopus

According to the Journal Citation Reports, the journal has a 2022 impact factor of 3.0.
