= Salomon Ehrmann =

Jewish-Austrian dermatologist and histologist (1854–1926)

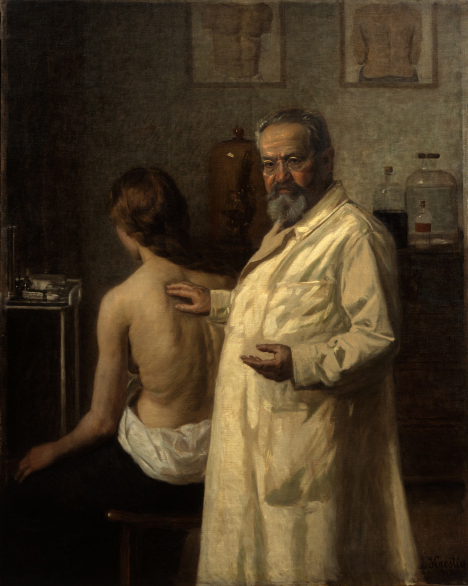
Portrait of Salomon Ehrmann by Lazar Krestin (Vienna, 1913, oil on canvas). The Viennese dermatologist Salomon Ehrmann is shown in a white doctor's coat, treating a female patient in his surgery. Ehrmann had initially studied art history and he also painted. He created pictures based on his medical observations. Two of these works hang on the wall behind him, the one on the right bearing his signature.

Salomon Ehrmann (December 19, 1854 - October 24, 1926) was a Jewish-Austrian dermatologist and histologist born in the village of Ostrovec, today part of the Czech Republic. He was an important member of the so-called Vienna School of Dermatology, a group founded by Ferdinand von Hebra (1816–1888).

Ehrmann was a pupil of histopathologist Carl Wedl (1815–1891) at the University of Vienna. He later became director of the dermatological department at Vienna General Hospital. He specialized in the field of syphilology, and is remembered for his research involving the parasite Spirochaetae pallida (the causative agent of syphilis), and its spread throughout the human body.

In 1895 he described acne keloidalis, which he referred to as folliculitis nuchae sclerotisans. Among his written works was a comparative diagnostic atlas of skin diseases called Vergleichend-diagnostischer Atlas der Hautkrankheiten und der Syphilide. Other published works by Ehrmann include:

- Kompendium der speziellen Histopathologie der Haut (with Johannes Fick), 1905
- Uber die Beziehungen der Spirochaeta pallida zu den Lymph- und Blutbahnen
- Die Phagocytose und die Degenerationsformen der Spirochaete pallida im Primäraffekt und Lymphstrang, 1906
- Beziehungen der ekzematösen Erkrankungen zu inneren Leiden, 1924.
