= Maremmana =

Breed of cattle

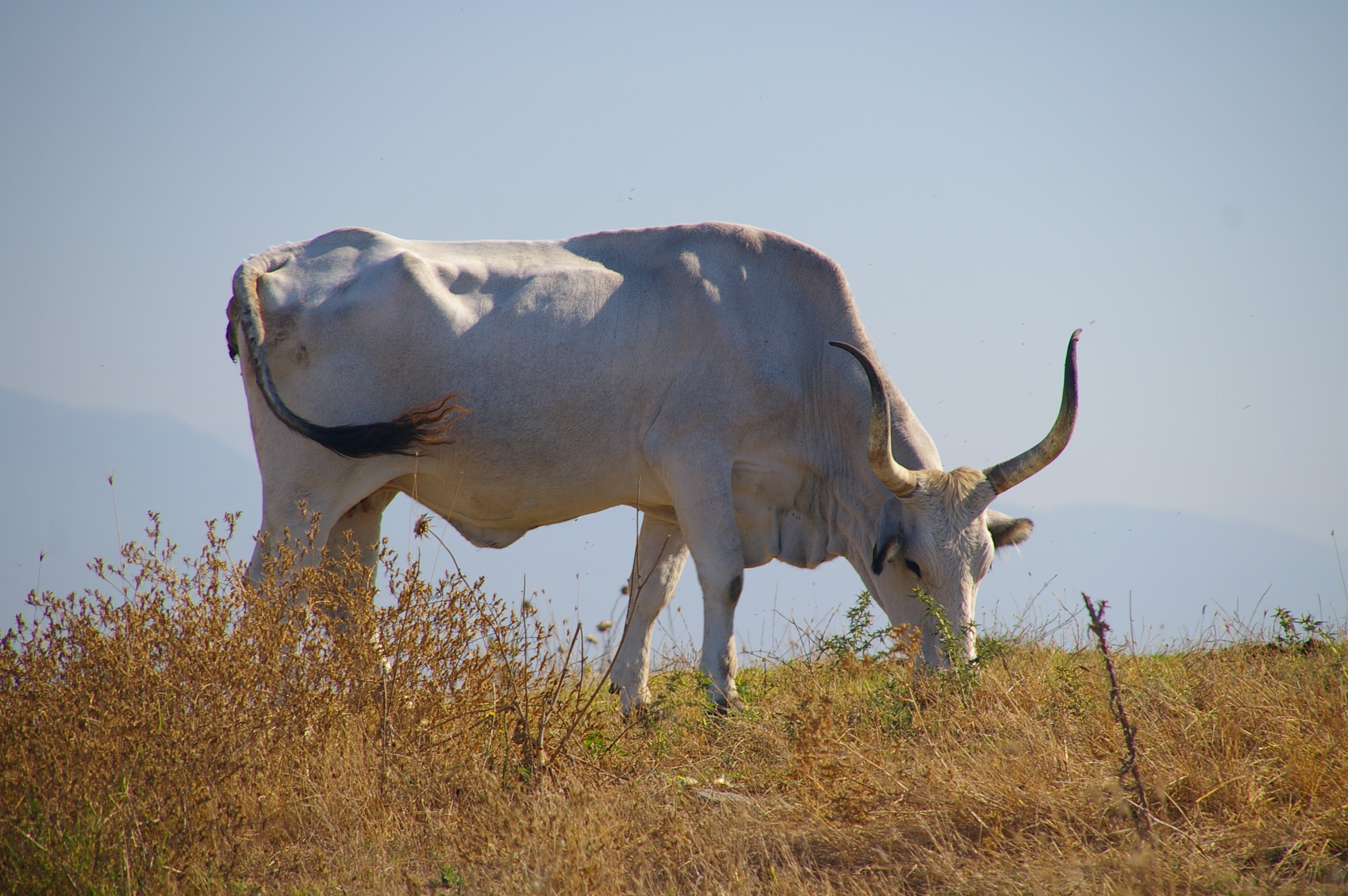
- Country of origin: Italy
- Distribution: Tuscany, Lazio
- Use: Dual-purpose, beef and draught

Traits
- Weight: Male: 850–1000 kg; Female: 550–650 kg
- Height: Male: 150–155 cm; Female: 143-150 cm
- Coat: Grey, dark in males, lighter in females; black skin; black nose
- Horn status: Horned

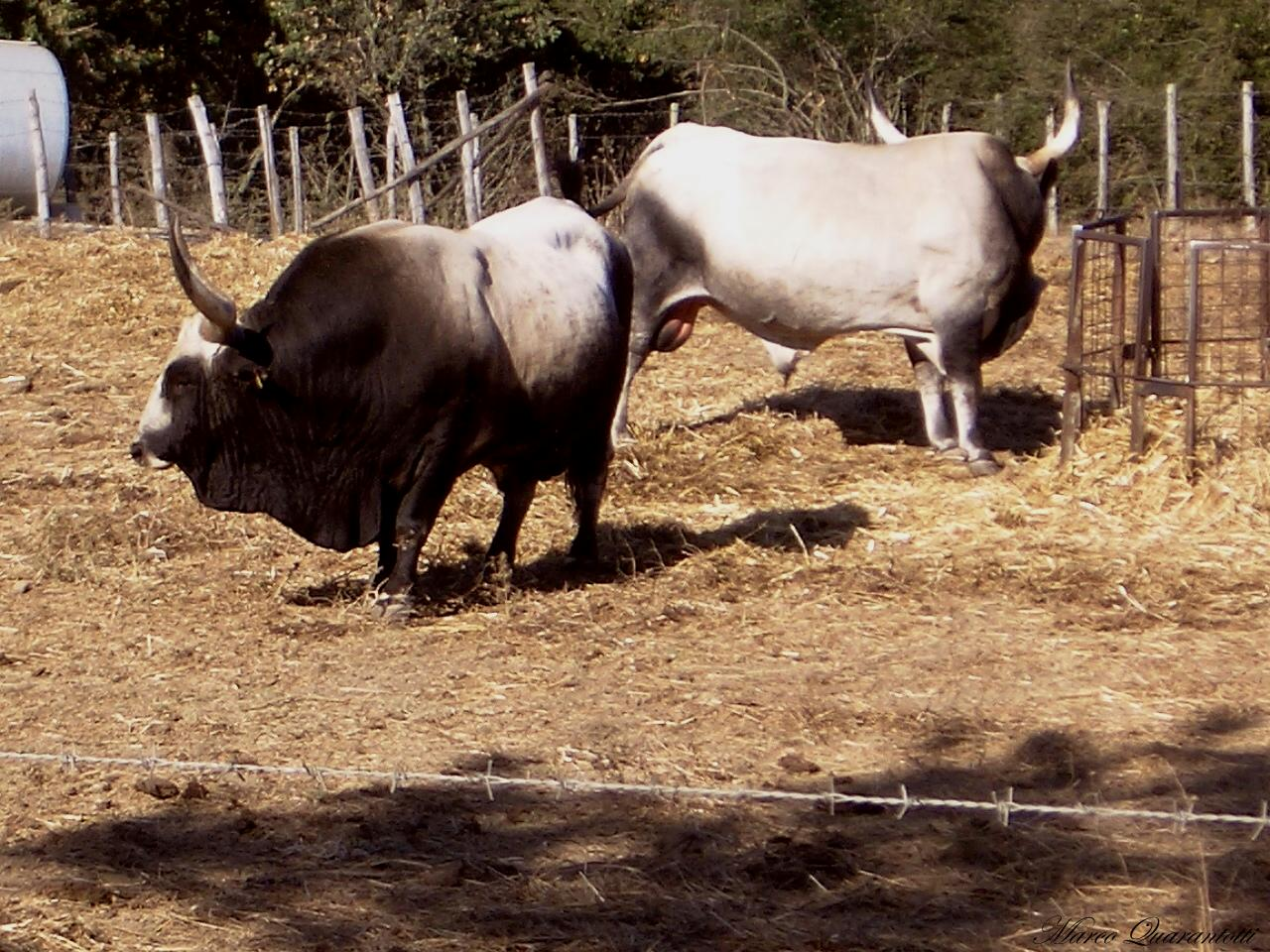
Maremmano bulls

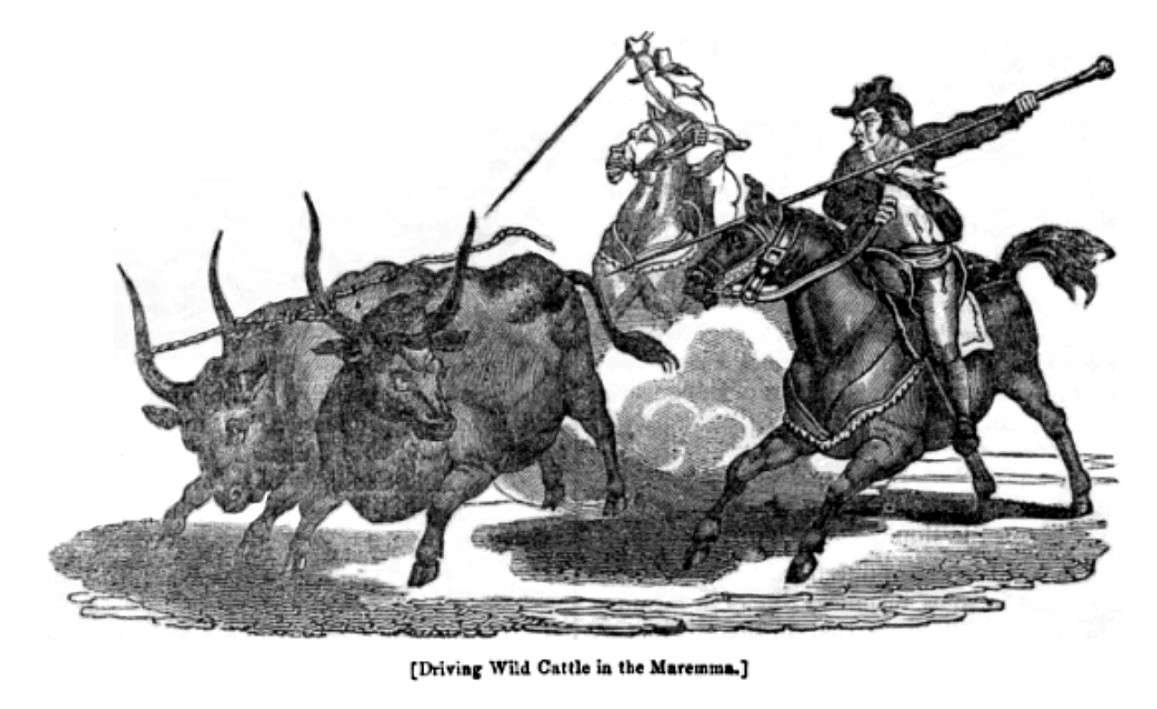
Driving wild cattle in the Maremma, woodcut from The Penny Magazine, 1832

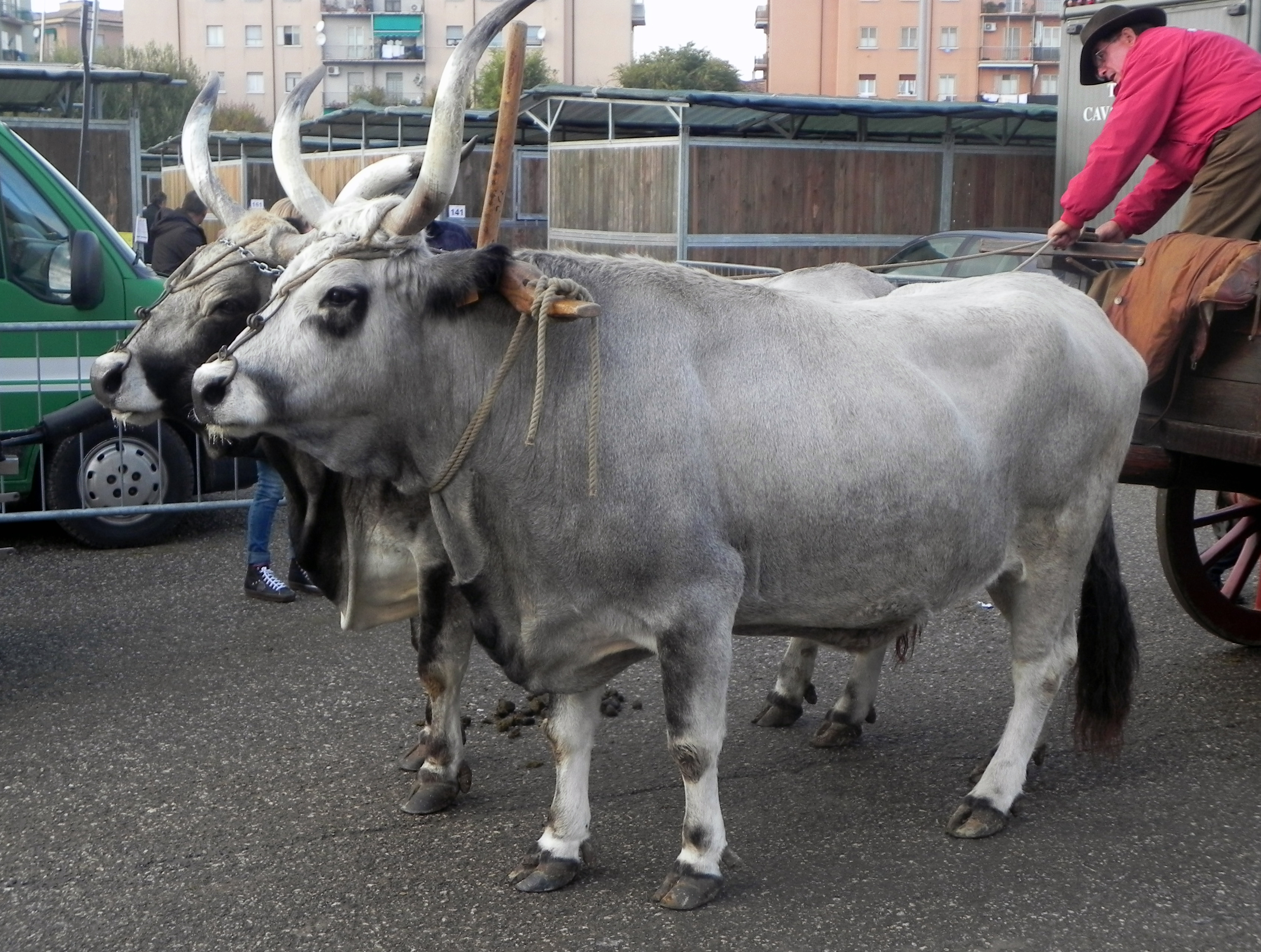
Yoked pair of Maremmano oxen

The Maremmana is a breed of cattle reared in the Maremma, a former marshland region in southern Tuscany and northern Lazio in central Italy. It is raised principally in the provinces of Grosseto, Rome, and Viterbo.

== History ==
The origins of the Maremmana breed are entirely obscure. Some sources maintain that the Maremmana descends from the Bos taurus macrocerus of which archeological evidence is preserved in the Etruscan remains of Caere and Vetulonia, with a later admixture of Podolic cattle brought into the Italian peninsula by the Huns and other invaders from the east. Others suggest that the Maremmana is a direct descendant of those Asiatic grey cattle, while still others maintain that it descends directly from the aurochs, Bos primigenius primigenius.

For centuries, large herds of Maremmana cattle were raised in the malarial marshlands of the Maremma, herded by the butteri, the mounted herdsmen of the region. Between 1737 and 1859, Tuscany was ruled by the Habsburg grand-dukes, who sent Maremmano bulls to their estates in Hungary to improve their Hungarian Grey Cattle. Following the drainage of the marshes in the Battle for Land of the Fascist era, and consequent destruction of the wetland habitat, efforts were made to improve the breed, and in particular to increase their body weight, with considerable success. A herd book for the breed was opened in 1935.

The Second World War and the mechanisation of agriculture caused a rapid fall in breed numbers. In 1956, a population of 157,387 head was recorded; in 2006, total breed numbers were 8812. In recent years, a new recognition of the perfect adaptation of the breed to the harsh terrain and poor pastures of the Maremma has occurred, where the Maremmana is capable of surviving in a semi-feral state throughout the year with only minimal management on land that would otherwise be abandoned. At the end of 2012, the total number recorded in the herd book for the breed was 9801.

== Characteristics ==
The Maremmana is grey; males are darker than females, especially on the foreparts. The muzzle, hooves, switch, and lower part of the scrotum are black; the skin is black, but some depigmentation at natural openings is tolerated. As in other breeds of Podolic origin, calves are born wheat-coloured and become grey around 3 months old.

The horns are robust; in males they are of half-moon shape, in females lyre-shaped. They are slate-grey in young animals, and become whitish with black tips in adulthood.

== Uses ==
The Maremmana was formerly used as a draught animal, principally in agriculture and forestry, but also for haulage work, for example in the marble quarries of Monte Amiata.

It is today raised principally for meat; the breed standard was substantially altered in 1986 to favour productivity over other characteristics. It is one of the two breeds used in the preparation of the bistecca alla fiorentina, the other being the better-known Chianina. The Maremmana is listed in the Italian Slow Food Ark of Taste.
