= Dohi =

Dohi (written: 土肥) is a Japanese surname. Notable people with the surname include:

- Keizo Dohi (土肥 慶蔵, 1866–1931), Japanese dermatologist and urologist
- Kodai Dohi (土肥 航大, born 2001), Japanese footballer
