= Podolian cattle =

Breed of cattle

Podolian cattle comprise a group of cattle breeds characterised by grey coats and upright and often long horns that are thought to have originated in the Podolian steppe.

Breeds in this group include:

- Podolian Grey Steppe breeds from Eastern Europe
  - Hungarian Grey / Hungarian Steppe cattle (Hungary)
  - Slavonian-Syrmian Podolian (Croatia)
  - Srem Podolian / Serbian Podolian (Serbia)
  - Sura de Stepă / Romanian Grey (Romania)
  - Ukrainian Grey / Ukrainian Steppe Cattle (Ukraine)
- Podolian-Istrian breeds from Central Italy, Southern Italy and Istria (Croatia; Slovenia)
  - Boškarin / Istrian cattle (Croatia; Slovenia)
  - Maremmana (Italy)
  - Podolica (Italy)
- Podolian-Illyrian breeds from the Balkans and Anatolia
  - Boz Irk / Anatolian Grey (Turkey)
  - Iskar Grey / Bulgarian Grey (Bulgaria)
  - Katerini cattle (Greece)
  - Sykia cattle (Greece)
- Podolian cattle from Northern Italy
  - Romagnola / Romagnola cattle (Italy)
