= Josef Jiří Kolár =

Czech actor, translator and writer

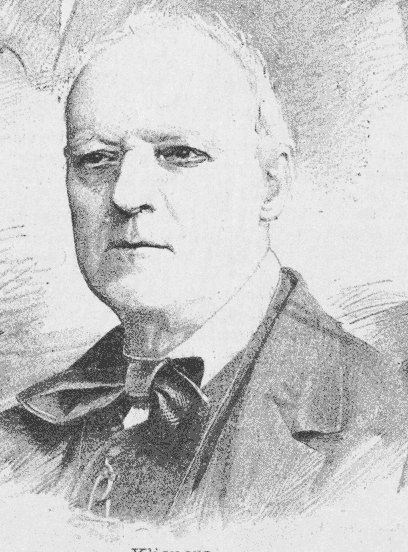
- Portrét J. J. Kolára od Jana Vilímka
- Born: 9 December 1812; Prague
- Died: 31 January 1896 (aged 83); Prague
- Resting place: Olšany Cemetery
- Occupation: Writer, actor, playwright, translator, translator, theatre director, poet
- Children: Auguste Auspitz-Kolar

Josef Jiří Kolár (9 December 1812 – 31 January 1896) was a Czech theatrical actor, director, translator, and writer.

== Early life ==
He was born Josef Kolář (later also spelled Kollar or Kolar) in Prague as the last of three sons to a family of a clothes trader who had twelve children altogether. His parents gave him good education which he broadened at schools so that he could read Homer in Greek before university. He also learned German, French, Italian and English. He started studying philosophy (influenced by Augustin Smetana), natural science and philology at Charles University in 1830 and became interested in the Czech revival movement. He interrupted the studies in 1833 when he became a tutor to a Hungarian noble family in Pest. There he studied medicine and made friends with Ján Kollár. Once he had an argument with a Hungarian nobleman about Hungarian and Slavic languages which ended up with a duel – Kolár was seriously injured and spent several weeks in bed. He also travelled a great deal in Western Europe. He added the middle name Jiří to his name for his admiration for George Gordon Byron.

== Theatrical career ==
After three years Kolár had to return to Prague, where he continued studying at the university. He became acquainted with Josef Kajetán Tyl, who kindled his interest in theatre. Kolár's first amateur role was in Hadrian z Římsů by Václav Kliment Klicpera. He played the part of the recently deceased Karel Hynek Mácha. In 1837, Kolár was engaged in the Estates Theatre, and from 1842 appeared also in German language plays. He also became director of Czech drama at the Theatre in Rose Street (Divadlo v Růžové ulici) and translated and directed several plays by Shakespeare and Schiller.

Kolár's translation of The Taming of the Shrew (1846) was the first translation of that play into the Czech language. In 1848 Kolár was arrested and briefly held in prison. When Tyl left the Estates Theatre in 1851, Kolár became the leading personality of the theatre.

In 1853 the success of Kolár's translation of Shakespeare's Hamlet led him to plan with his pupil Jakub Malý a systematic translation into Czech of all of Shakespeare's plays, to be published by the Bohemian Museum. Kolár himself provided translations of four plays, Maly eleven, František Doucha and Jan Josef Čejka nine each, and Ladislav Čelakovský (the son of František Ladislav Čelakovský) four. The project was completed in 1872.

In 1859 Kolár was nominated as director of the Czech stage, but after the Czech part of the theatre became independent in the Provisional Theatre in 1862, Kolár stayed in the German ensemble of the Estates Theatre. In 1866 he became chief director of the Provisional Theatre where he directed especially operas. In 1881 he became a literary manager in the National Theatre.

== Friendship with Augustin Smetana ==
In 1844 Kolár became a friend of Augustin Smetana, a Hegelian philosopher and later (1850) excommunicated priest. He turned his attention to philosophy again and took part in the meetings with Augustin Smetana in his apartment, where among guests were Anton Springer, Vincenc Náhlovský, Michael František von Canaval, and Bernard Bolzano.

== Anna Marta Manetinská ==
Kolár married actress Anna Manetinská. Born in Pest in 1817, Manetinská was the daughter of a Prague and Pest actor and singer. She returned to Prague with her mother and was sent to a convent to be brought up. At the age of eight she started playing child roles in a theatre in the apartment of her grandmother and was later taken from the convent to be involved in theatre life. In 1834 she became a member of the ensemble in Estates Theatre. She was German but the leaders of the theatre persuaded her to learn Czech and play in Czech theatre. She became beloved by the Czech audience. She and Kolár married in 1834. Their daughter Augusta was a piano player.

== Roles ==
List of theatrical roles, by work and year
Year	Author: Play	Role	Notes
1838	Heinrich von Kleist: Käthchen of Heilbronn (Katynka Helbronská)	Bedřich Wetter / Friedrich Wetter	Estates Theatre →
1839, 1858, 1869	William Shakespeare: Macbeth (Mekbeth)	Makduf / Macduff	
1840	Friedrich Schiller: The Robbers (Loupežníci)	Karel / Karl Moor	
1840	Theodor Hell: Die beiden Galeerensklaven oder Die Mühle von Saint Aldero (Galejní otroci, aneb: klein Alderonský)	Neznámý	music by Joseph Schubert
1842	Karl Gutzkow: Werner oder Herz und Welt	Vilém z Jordánu / Heinrich von Jordan	
1842	Václav Kliment Klicpera: Blaník, aneb: Zdeněk Zásmucký	Prokop ze Švamberku	Theatre in Rose Street →
1842	Pius Alexander Wolff: Preciosa	Alonzo	music by Carl Maria von Weber
1843, 1858	Václav Kliment Klicpera: Hadrián z Římsů	Soběbor	
1845	Franz Xaver Told: Der Zauberschleier	Vít Lipenský	Estates Theatre →
1846	Josef Jiří Kolár: Monika	Hipolyt	
1847	William Shakespeare: The Taming of the Shrew (Skrocení zlé ženy)	Petrukio / Petruchio	
1848	Ferdinand Břetislav Mikovec: Záhuba rodu Přemslovského	Václav III	
1848	Josef Jiří Kolár: Číslo 76, aneb: Praha před 100 lety	Václav Rainer	
1849	Josef Kajetán Tyl: Jan Hus, kazatel betlémský	Václav IV	
1849	Josef Václav Frič: Václav IV, král český	Jan Žižka z Trocnova	
1849	Joseph-Bernard Rosier: Brutus, Lache Cesar	Jules z Grandierů	
1850	Friedrich Schiller: The Robbers	Franc / Franz Moor	
1850	Josef Jiří Kolár: Smrt Žižkova	Jetřich	
1850	Friedrich Schiller: Intrigue and Love (Ouklady a láska)	Franc / Franz Moor	
1852	Josef Jiří Kolár: Don César a spanilá Magelóna	Šimon Lomnický z Budče	
1852	Charlotte Birch-Pfeiffer: Král Václav a jeho kat	Václav IV	
1853	William Shakespeare: Hamlet (Hamlet, princ dánský)	Hamlet / Prince Hamlet	
1854	William Shakespeare: Richard III (Život a smrt krále Richarda Třetího)	Richard, vévoda Gloster / Richard, Duke of Gloucester	
1855	Charlotte Birch-Pfeiffer: Die Waise aus Lowood (Sirotek Lowoodský)	Lord Rolland Rochester	based on Charlotte Brontë's Jane Eyre
1855, 1879	Johann Wolfgang von Goethe: Faust	Mefistofeles / Mephistopheles	
1857	William Shakespeare: Coriolanus (Koriolanus, vojevůdce Římský)	Kajus Marius Koriolanus / Gaius Marcius Coriolanus	
1857, 1873, 1874, 1884	William Shakespeare: The Merchant of Venice (Kupec benátský)	Shylok / Shylock	
1857, 1866	Friedrich Schiller: Wallenstein's Death (Smrt Valdšteinova)	Albrecht Valdštein / Albrecht von Wallenstein	
1858	Václav Kliment Klicpera: Divotvorný klobouk	Koliáš	
1858	William Shakespeare: Romeo and Juliet (Romeo a Julie)	Merkucio / Mercutio	
1858	Albert Emil Brachvogel: Narziß (Narzis)	Narcis Rameau	
1858	Friedrich Schiller: Wilhelm Tell (Vilém Tell)	Hermann Gessler	
1858	Johann Wolfgang von Goethe: Egmont	Vévoda Alba / Duke of Alba	
1859	William Shakespeare: Henry IV (Jindřich IV.)	Sir John Falstaff	
1859	Salomon Hermann Mosenthal: Deborah	Abraham	
1860	Vítězslav Hálek: Carevič Alexej	Car Petr Veliký / Peter the Great	
1861	Friedrich Schiller: Die Jungfrau von Orleans (Panna Orleánská)	Talbot	
1861	Josef Jiří Kolár: Magelona	Rudolf II.	
1863, 1866	William Shakespeare: King Lear (Král Lear)	Lear	Provisional Theatre →
1867	William Shakespeare: Hamlet (Hamlet, princ dánský)	Klaudius / King Claudius	
1867	Heinrich Laube: Der Statthalter von Bengalen (Náměstek bengálský)	Lord William Chatham	
1868	Emanuel Bozděch: Baron Goertz	Baron Goertz	
1868	Josef Jiří Kolár: Smrt Žižkova	Jan Žižka z Trocnova	
1868, 1874	William Shakespeare: Othello	Jago / Iago	
1870	Victorien Sardou: Patrie! (Vlast)	Hrabě Rysoor	
1870	František Věnceslav Jeřábek: Služebník svého pána	Šlechtic z Dornenronů	
1871	Ludwig Anzengruber: Der Pfarrer von Kirchfeld (Farář z Podlesí)	Joza	
1871, 1884	Josef Jiří Kolár: Pražský žid	Jan Mydlář	
