= Vienna School of Dermatology =

Group of dermatologists affiliated to the University of Vienna

The Vienna School of Dermatology was a group of dermatologists affiliated to the University of Vienna who became an important reference in the development of modern dermatology in the second half of the 19th century. It was founded by Ferdinand Ritter von Hebra (1816–1888) with the collaboration of his mentor, Carl Freiherr von Rokitansky (1804–1878) and Carl Wedl (1815–1891), a pathologist with interest in skin diseases. Their pupils, Isidor Neumann (1832–1906), Salomon Stricker (1834–1898), Heinrich Auspitz (1834–1885), Moritz Kaposi (1837–1902), all of the same generation; and Paul Gerson Unna (1850–1929) and Salomon Ehrmann (1854–1926), continued the tradition. Unna later became the father of German dermatopathology.

Von Hebra first organized the dermatological service in the Vienna General Hospital. He was inspired by the movement towards a scientific dermatology already established in England by Robert Willan (1757–1812) and Thomas Bateman (1778–1821); and in France by Jean-Louis-Marc Alibert (1768–1837), Laurent-Théodore Biett (1781–1840), Pierre Louis Alphée Cazenave (1795–1877) and Pierre François Olive Rayer (1793–1867). The Vienna School adopted the approach of pathology (as influenced by the great Carl von Rokitansky, a professor of von Hebra) and the doctrine of local causative agents. For example, 2,000 of the first 2,500 dermatological patients treated by von Hebra had scabies.

The members of the Vienna School discovered and described many new diseases and signs, such as:

- Auspitz's sign
- Eczema herpeticum
- Erythema exudativum multiforme
- Hebra's disease
- Hebra's prurigo
- Impetigo herpetiformis
- Kaposi-Irgang syndrome
- Kaposi's sarcoma
- Lichen acuminatus
- Lichen planus bullosus
- Lichen ruber moniliformis
- Lupus erythematosus
- Pityriasis rubra
- Tinea cruris
- Unna-Politzer naevus
- Unna's disease
- Unna-Thost syndrome
- Xeroderma pigmentosa

== Bibliography ==
- Finnerud CW. Ferdinand von Hebra and the Vienna school of dermatology. AMA Arch Derm Syphilol. 1952 Aug;66(2):223–32.
- Holubar, K. The History of European Dermatopathology
