= Moriz Heider =

Austrian dentist (1816–1866)

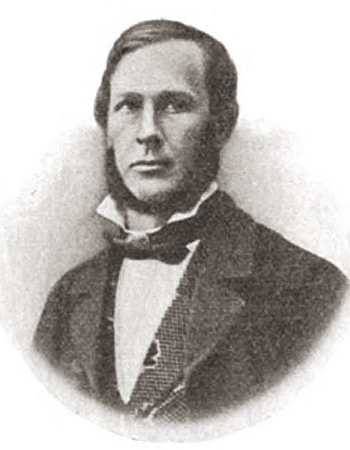
Heider in 1855

Moriz Heider (21 June 1816, Vienna – 29 July 1866, Vienna) was an Austrian dentist born in Vienna.

He studied medicine in Vienna, where he was an assistant to Georg Carabelli (1787–1842). In 1858, he became an associate professor at the University of Vienna.

Heider was a pioneer of modern dentistry, being remembered for introducing electrosurgery (Galvanokaustik) into dentistry. He is also credited for being the first dentist in a German-speaking country to use a procedure called Goldhämmerfüllungen, a technique used for installing gold fillings.

In 1861, he founded the Verein österreichischer Zahnärzte (Austrian Association of Dentists), known today as the Österreichische Gesellschaft für Zahn-, Mund- und Kieferheilkunde or ÖGZMK (Austrian Society of Oral and Maxillofacial Surgery).

With histopathologist Carl Wedl (1815–1891), he was co-author of the highly regarded Atlas zur Pathologie der Zähne, a work later translated into English and published as "Atlas to the Pathology of the Teeth". After Heider's death in 1866, his pioneer work in dentistry was continued by his colleague Adolf Zsigmondy (1816–1880).
