= Keizo Dohi =

Keizō Dohi
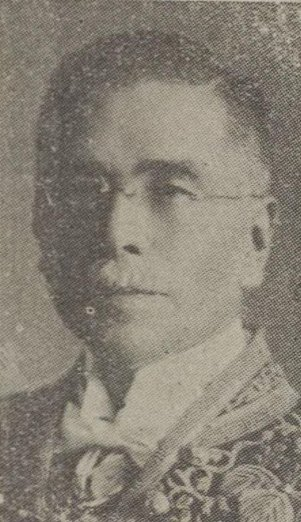
- Keizō in 1929

Keizō Dohi (土肥 慶蔵, Dohi Keizō) (1866-1931) was born in Fuchu (today's Echizen-city, Fukui Prefecture). He was a Japanese professor of dermatology and syphilis, and chair of the department of dermatology and syphilis at the University of Tokyo.

== Career ==
He trained at the Vienna School of Dermatology, and published his first article in 1896 the Archiv für Dermatologie und Syphilis in German.

Dohi learned the technique of moulage (wax modeling) in Vienna and introduced its practice to Japan. (Note: This technique had greatly contributed to medical education, however, the use of color film in recording skin manifestations made moulage obsolete.)

== Death and legacy ==
Dohi's name appears in Keratosis follicularis squamosa Dohi, which is a type of follicular keratosis, in which scales appear elevated from the skin surface reminding one of the floating leaves of the lotus. He died in 1931.
