= Enno Christophers =

Enno Christophers is emeritus professor of dermatology and venereology at the University of Kiel, Germany. He was appointed editor-in-chief of the Archives of Dermatological Research in 1975. In 1982 he delivered the Kung Sun Oh lecture, on the topic of psoriasis.

== Selected publications ==
- Christophers, Enno (June 2001). "Psoriasis − epidemiology and clinical spectrum: Psoriasis − epidemiology and clinical spectrum". Clinical and Experimental Dermatology. 26 (4): 314–320. doi:10.1046/j.1365-2230.2001.00832.x. PMID 11422182. S2CID 37721313.
- Christophers, Enno (1996). "The Immunopathology of Psoriasis". International Archives of Allergy and Immunology. 110 (3): 199–206. doi:10.1159/000237288. ISSN 1018-2438. PMID 8688665.
