= Philipp Josef Pick =

Austrian dermatologist

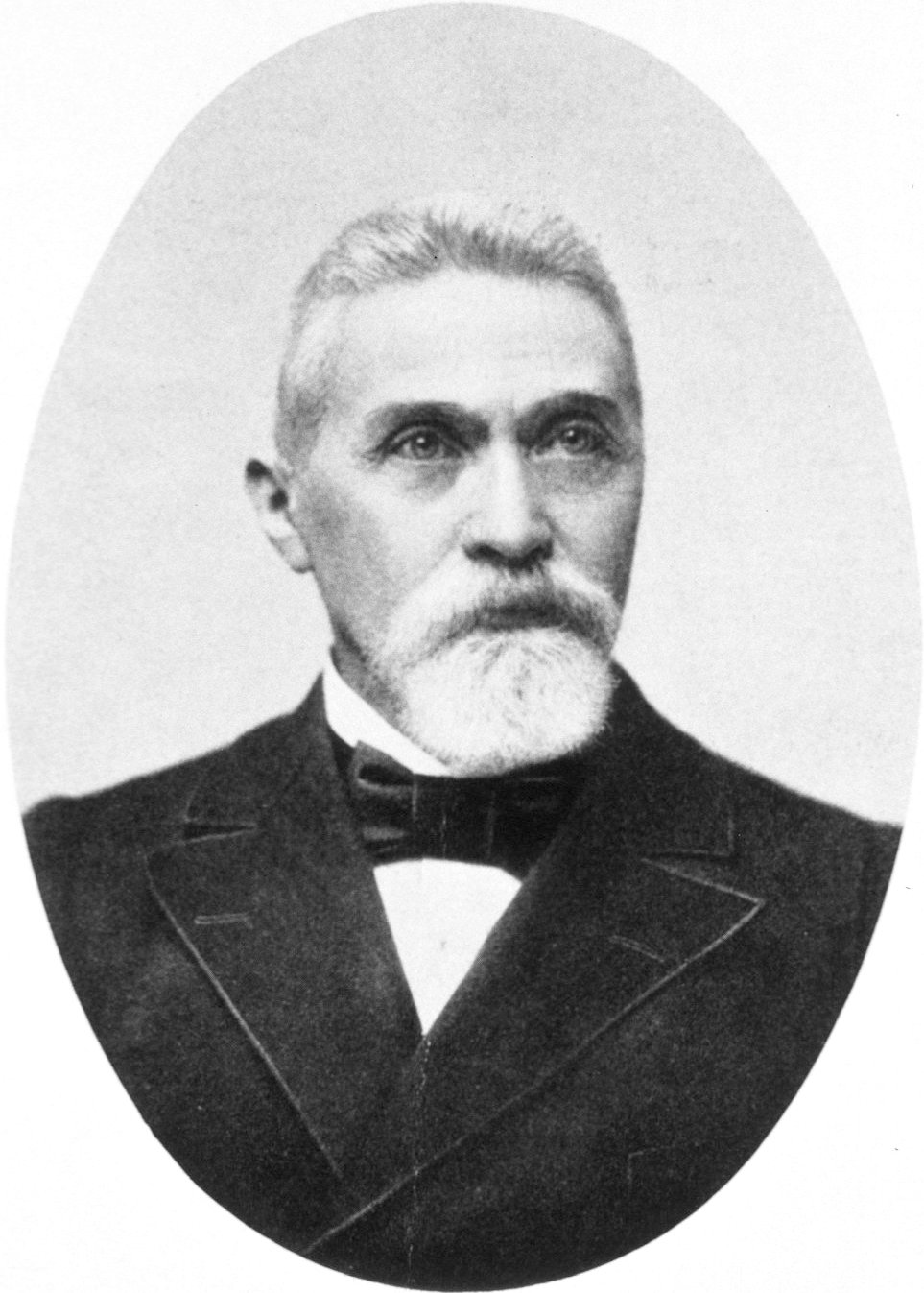
Philipp Josef Pick

Philipp Josef Pick (14 October 1834, Neustadt an der Mettau - 3 June 1910, Prague) was a dermatologist from the Austro-Hungarian Empire.

== Biography ==
He studied medicine at the University of Vienna as a pupil of Josef Hyrtl and Carl von Rokitansky. He obtained his doctorate in 1860 and served as an assistant to Joseph Škoda, Carl Ludwig Sigmund and Ferdinand Ritter von Hebra in Vienna. In 1867 he received his habilitation at the University of Prague, becoming an associate professor six years later. From 1896 to 1906 he was a full professor of dermatology at the University of Prague.

He was the first to describe the bacterial infection Trichomycosis palmellina, and independent of Heinrich Köbner (and shortly afterwards), he discovered Trichophyton tonsurans in eczema marginatum. He also made contributions in his research of molluscum contagiosum, melanosis lenticularis progressiva, urticaria pigmentosa, erythromelia and acne frontalis. With German dermatologist Karl Herxheimer, the eponymous "Pick-Herxheimer disease" is named, a disorder also known as acrodermatitis chronica atrophicans. He is credited for introducing iodoform into dermatology and for employing emplastrum saponatum salicylicum for the treatment of eczema.

In 1869, with Heinrich Auspitz, he founded the journal Archiv für Dermatologie und Syphilis, later to be known as the "Vierteljahresschrift für Dermatologie und Syphilis". In 1889, with Albert Neisser, he founded the "Deutschen Dermatologischen Gesellschaft". In 1888 he became an honorary member of the American Dermatological Association.

Philipp Josef Pick is the father of the internist and medical historian Friedrich Pick (1867-1926), the dermatologist Walter Pick (1874-1932) and the chemist Hans Pick (1879-1942), who was deported from Prague to Theresienstadt on 12 May 1942, victim of the Holocaust in Lublin.
