= Isidor Kaufmann =

Hungarian artist (1853–1921)

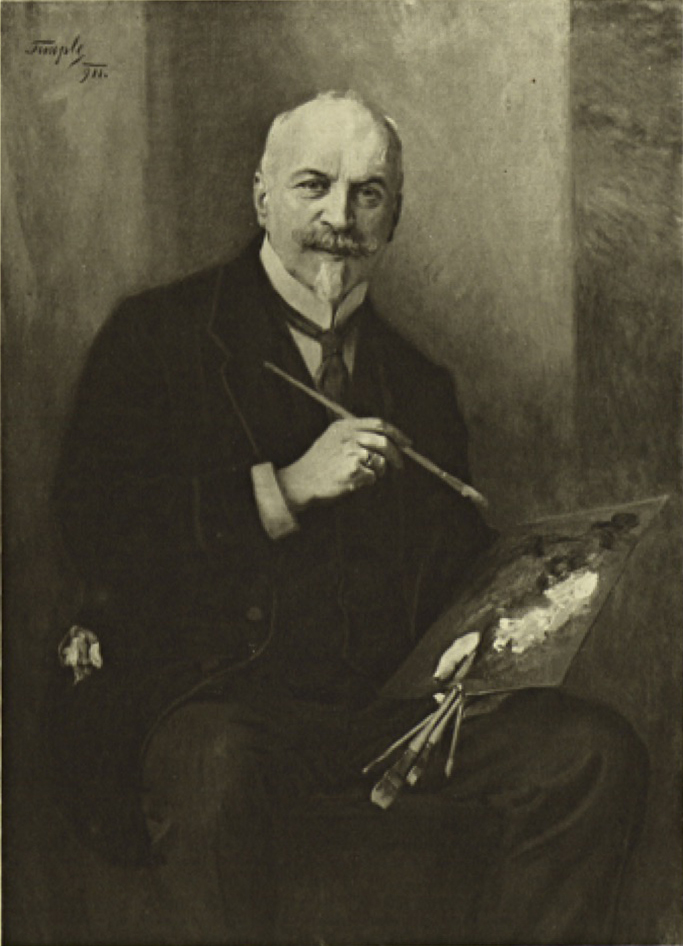
- Portrait of Isidor Kaufmann by Hans Temple (by 1921)
- Born: Kaufman(n) Izidor; March 22, 1853; Arad, Kingdom of Hungary
- Died: January 1, 1921 (aged 67); Vienna, Austria
- Education: Landes-Zeichenschule, Vienna Academy
- Known for: Painting
- Notable work: Der Besuch des Rabbi; Schachspieler; Der Zweifler
- Movement: Genre painting

Isidor Kaufmann (Hungarian: Kaufman(n) Izidor, Hebrew: איזידור קאופמן; 22 March 1853 in Arad – 1921 in Vienna) was an Austro-Hungarian painter of Jewish themes. Having devoted his career to genre painting, he traveled throughout Eastern Europe in search of scenes of Jewish, often Hasidic life. The artist's life and work was featured by the Jewish Museum Vienna 1995 in a show curated by Tobias G. Natter.

== Life and career ==
Born to Hungarian Jewish parents in Arad, Kingdom of Hungary (presently in Romania), Kaufmann was originally destined for a commercial career, and could fulfill his wish to become a painter only later in life.

In 1875, he went to the Landes-Zeichenschule in Budapest, where he remained for one year. In 1876, he left for Vienna, but being refused admission to the Academy of Fine Arts there, he became a pupil of the portrait painter Joseph Matthäus Aigner. He then entered the Malerschule of the Vienna Academy, and later became a private pupil of Professor Trenkwald.

His most noted paintings refer to the life of Jews in Poland. They include: Der Besuch des Rabbi (the original of which was owned by Emperor Franz Joseph I, in the Kunsthistorisches Museum), Schachspieler, Der Zweifler (for which he received the gold medal at the Weltausstellung of 1873).

Kaufmann's other honors include: the Baron Königswarter Künstler-Preis, the gold medal of the Emperor of Germany, a gold medal of the International Exhibition at Munich, and a medal of the third class at the Exposition Universelle in Paris.

One of his most prominent students was Lazar Krestin.

He married a cantor's daughter in 1882. They had five children.

== Gallery ==
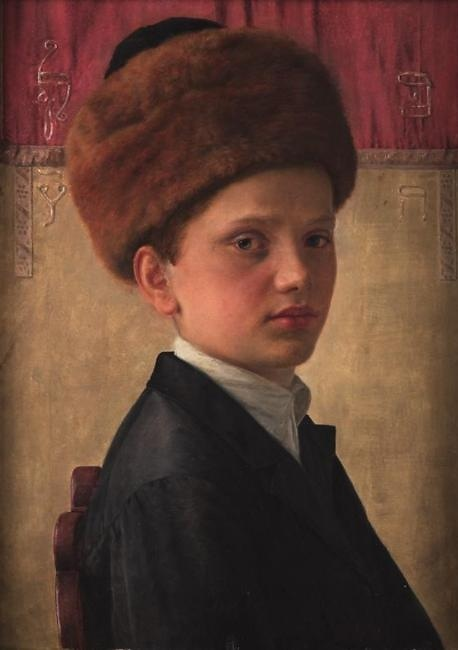
Kaufmann's Portrait of a Yeshiva Boy

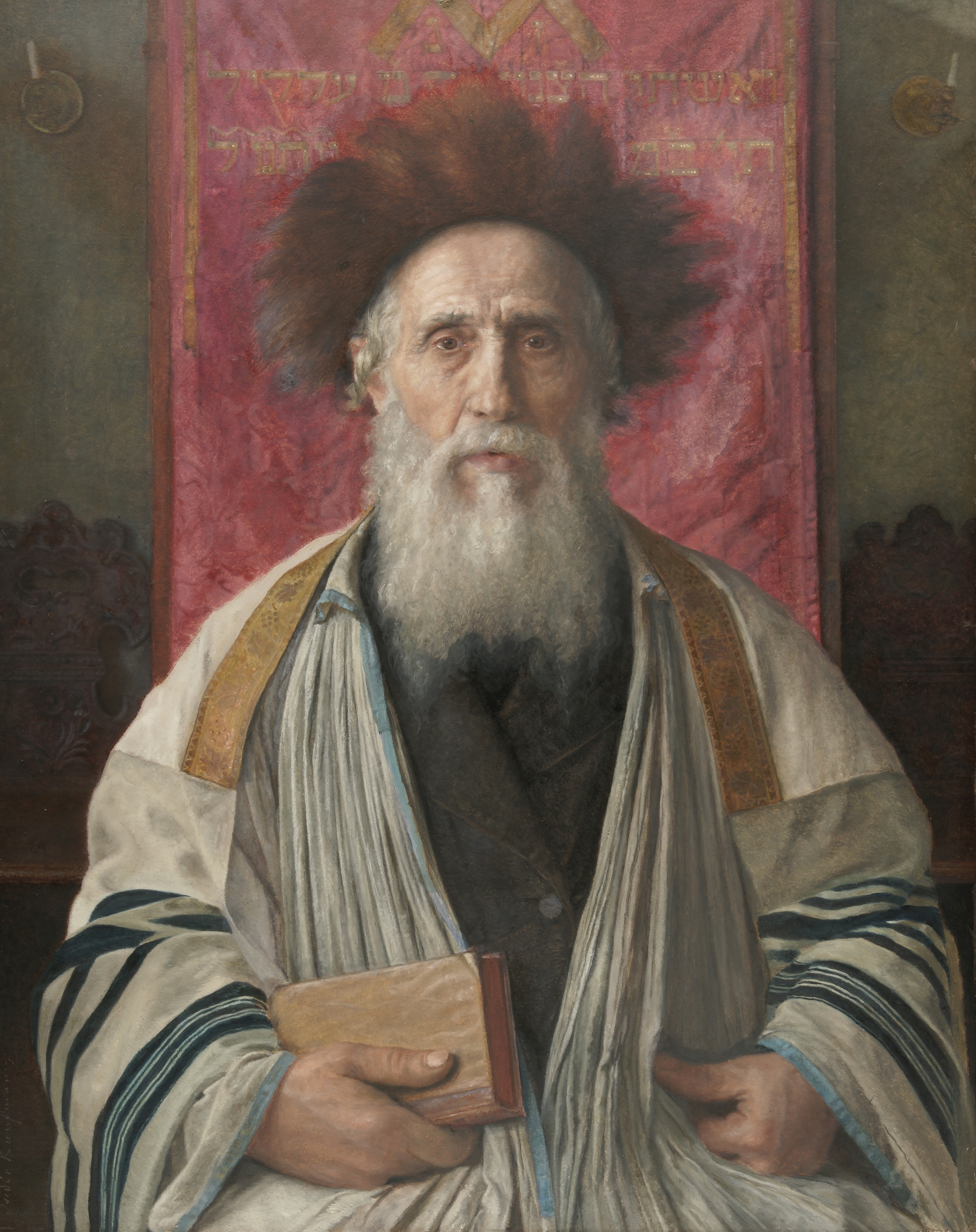
Portrait of a Rabbi

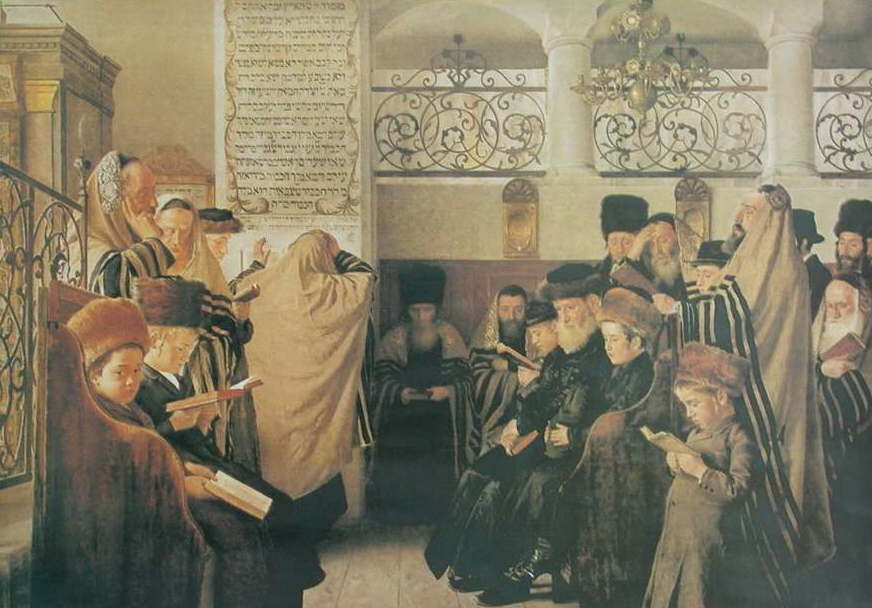
Day of Atonement, before 1907

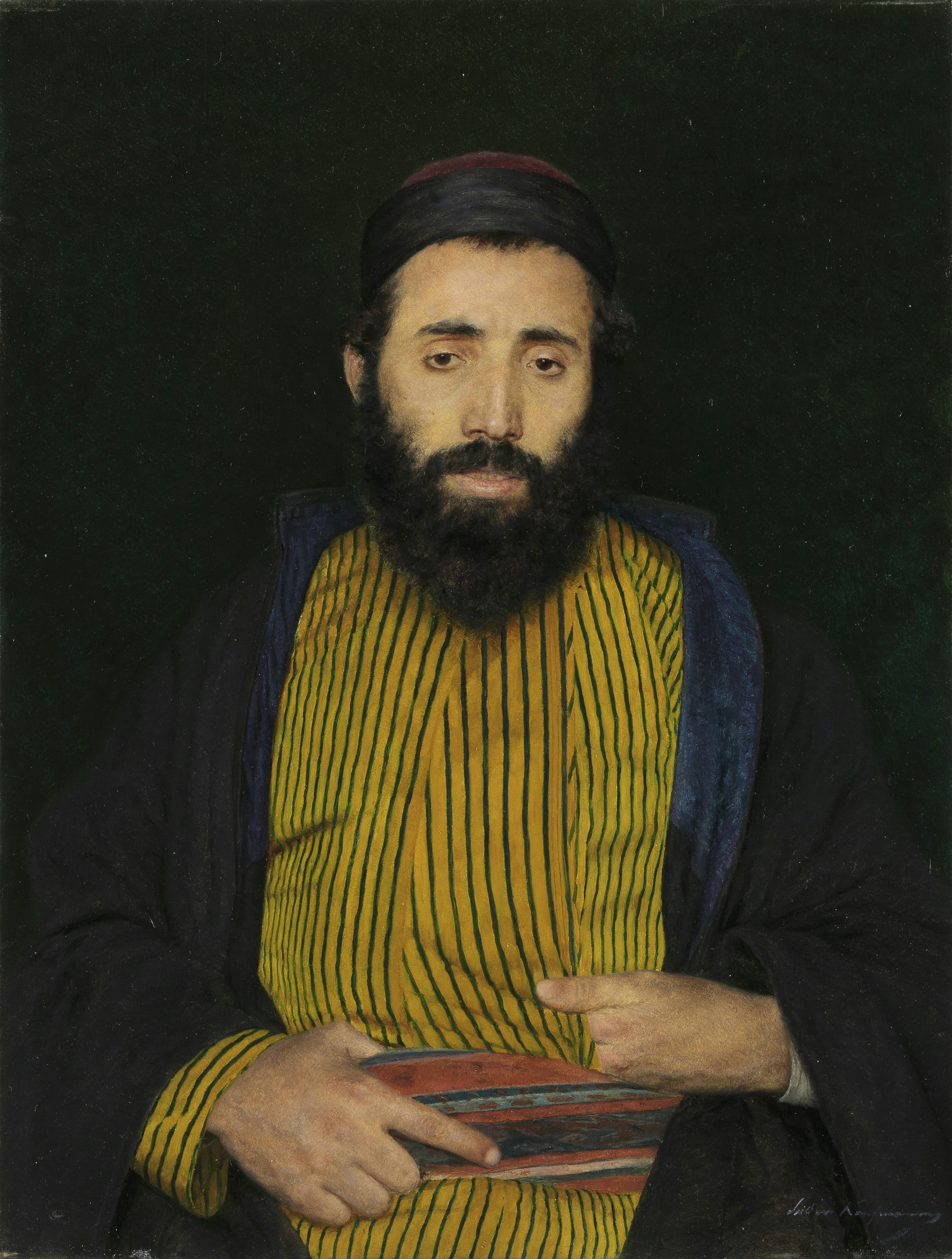
Portrait of a Sephardic Jew, c. 1900

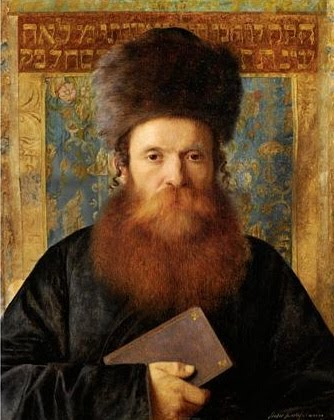
Rabbi

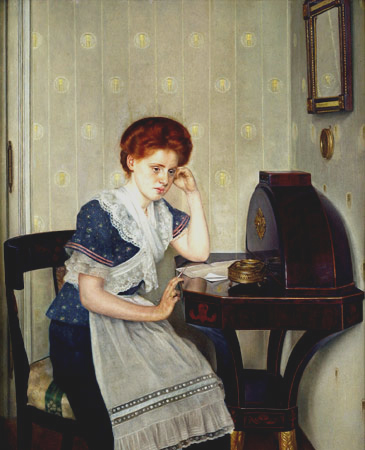
Lady at her desk
