= Cherga =

Cherga Черга
- Village
- Location within Altai Republic Location within Russia
- Coordinates: 51°34′N 85°34′E
- Country: Russia
- Region: Altai Republic
- District: Shebalinsky District
- Time zone: UTC+7:00

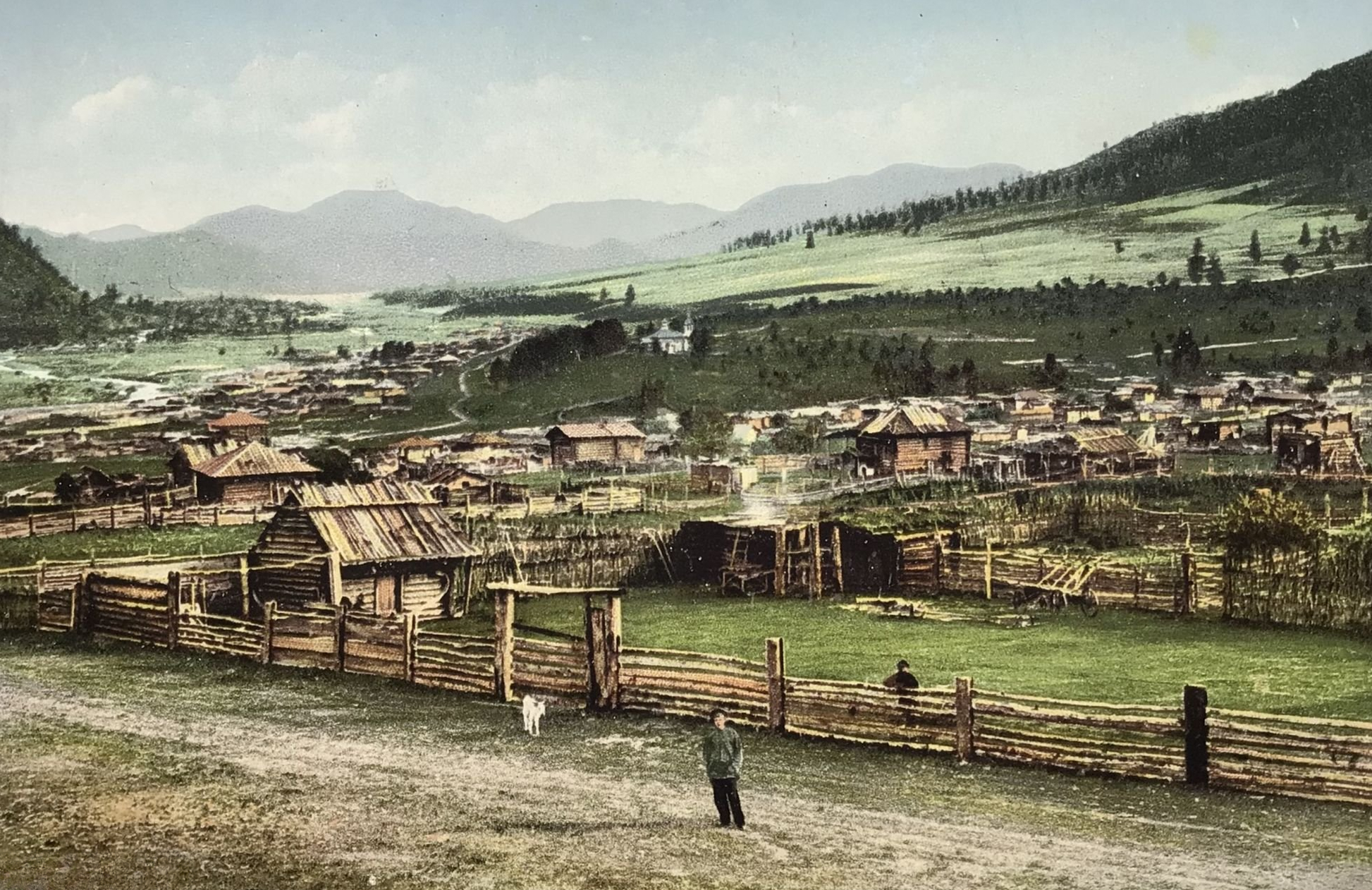
Cherga village at the beginning of 20th century

Cherga (Russian: Черга; Altay: Чаргы, Çargı) is a rural locality (a selo) and the administrative centre of Cherginsky Selsoviet of Shebalinsky District, the Altai Republic, Russia. The population was 1952 as of 2016. There are 23 streets.

== Geography ==
Cherga is located 37 km north of Shebalino (the district's administrative centre) by road. Kamlak is the nearest rural locality.
