= Hungarian Grey =

Hungarian breed of cattle

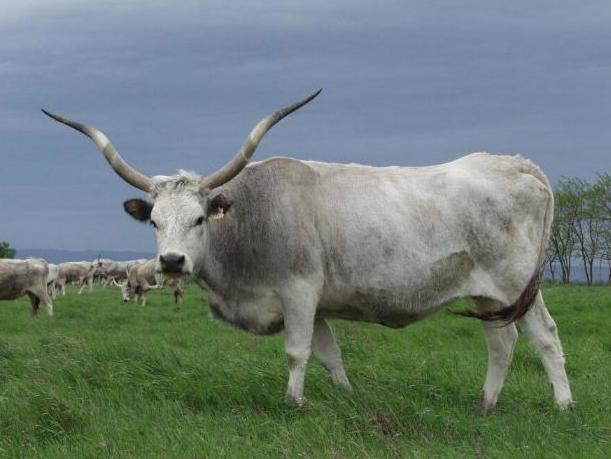
- In the Mekszikópuszta in western Hungary

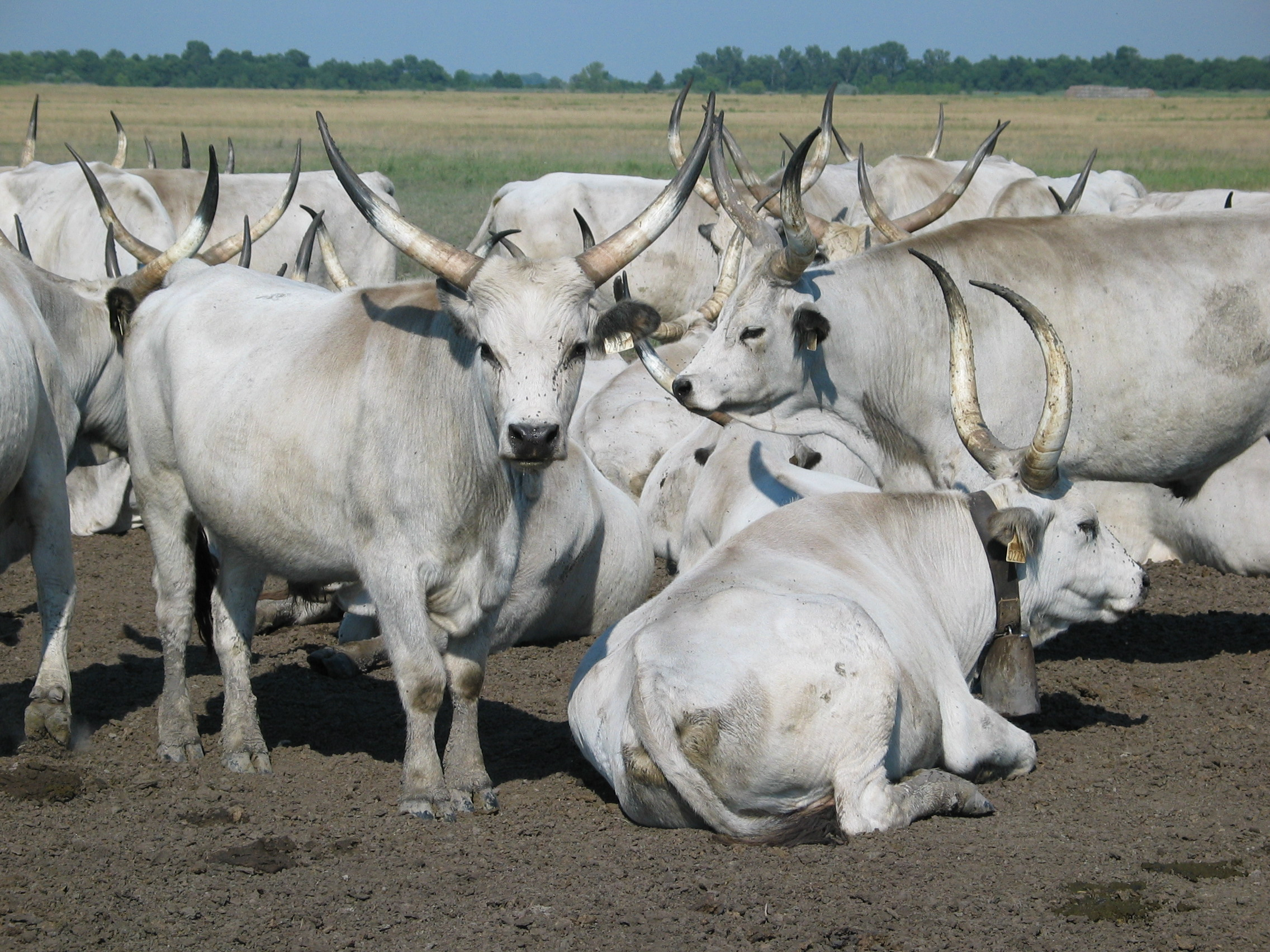
- In Hortobágy National Park, in the Puszta of Hortobágy in eastern Hungary
- Conservation status: FAO (2007): not at risk; DAD-IS (2022): not at risk
- Other names: Hungarian Steppe Cattle; Magyar Szürke
- Country of origin: Hungary
- Distribution: Bács-Kiskun; Hajdú-Bihar; Veszprém
- Use: dual-purpose, draught and beef

Traits
- Weight: Male: 800 kg; Female: 525 kg
- Height: Male: 150 cm; Female: 136 cm
- Skin colour: slate-coloured, dark grey mucosa
- Coat: shades of grey, from silvery white to ash grey
- Horn status: long slender horns, round in cross-section
- Cattle; Bos (primigenius) taurus

The Hungarian Grey (Hungarian: Magyar Szürke, pronounced [ˈmɒɟɒr ˈsyrkɛ]), also known as the Hungarian Grey Steppe, is a Hungarian breed of beef cattle. It belongs to the group of Podolic cattle and is characterised by long lyre-shaped horns and a pale grey coat. It is well adapted to extensive pasture systems and was formerly raised in very large numbers in the Hungarian puszta. In the twentieth century it came close to extinction, but numbers have since risen.

== History ==
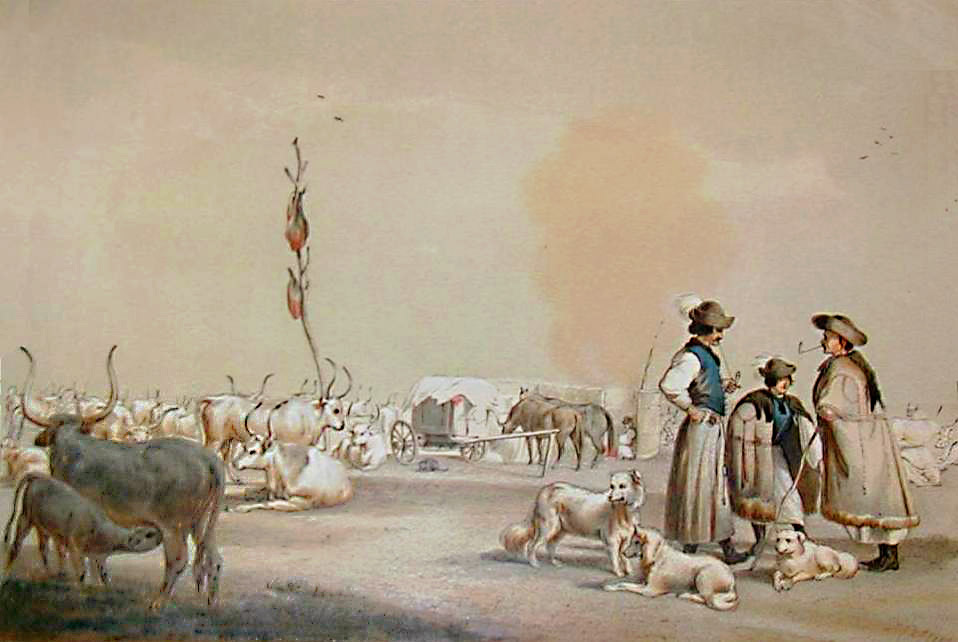
Gulyás herdsmen with Hungarian Grey cattle, lithograph by Sterio Károly (1821–1862)

The origins of the Hungarian Grey are unknown. It was formerly accepted that it had arrived in the ninth century with the Magyars who came from the east, took the Carpathian Basin and settled there; this theory is not consistent with the archaeological record. It has also been suggested at various times that it was introduced in some later migration, possibly by Cumanian or Pecheneg peoples; that it was brought from the south by refugees from the Balkans; or that it came from the Italian peninsula, acquired either by raiding in the tenth century, or by trade during the period of Angevin rule in the fourteenth century. Another theory, that it descends directly from the aurochs, Bos primigenius, was attributed by Charles Darwin, writing in 1868, to Ludwig Rütimeyer; it is not consistent with the osteometric data, but the possibility remains of some aurochs influence in Mediaeval times.

From the Middle Ages until the eighteenth century great numbers of grey cattle were raised extensively on the plains of Hungary. Many were driven on the hoof by hajduk for hundreds of kilometres westward to the markets of cities in western Europe to be slaughtered for beef. The principal destination was Vienna, but others reached Augsburg, Auspitz, Nürnberg, Strasbourg and Venice. During the fifteenth and sixteenth centuries, tens of thousands of cattle were exported in this way each year, and in the seventeenth century the number may have exceeded 100000 per year. The trade was gravely disrupted by the Ottoman invasions, and for some time was also limited by a monopoly granted by the Imperial court to the Landverleger-Compagnia of Vienna in 1622.

Hungarian cattle are documented at Augsburg in a document of 1526. Another sixteenth-century document refers specifically to magnus cornuotes boves Hungaricos or 'long-horned Hungarian cattle'.

In the eighteenth century changing market conditions led to a substantial decline in this trade, and the cattle came to be used principally as draught animals, a purpose to which they were well suited.

In 1931 the Hungarian Grey Cattle Breeders' Association was established and encouraged the keeping and breeding of the cattle. World War II disrupted the efforts. There were only 160 cows and 6 bulls on three farms in the early 1960s. Around that time a patriotic interest in preserving local breeds emerged.

By 1975 there were only 300 cows left in two herds, but numbers have since increased. The rebound in numbers is partially due to cryoconservation efforts made by the Hungarian government. Government subsidies are available to breeders of the cattle. In 2003 the Hungarian Grey supplied approximately 12% of the locally-produced beef consumed in Hungary. It is distributed mainly in the counties of Bács-Kiskun, Hajdú-Bihar and Veszprém.

== Characteristics ==
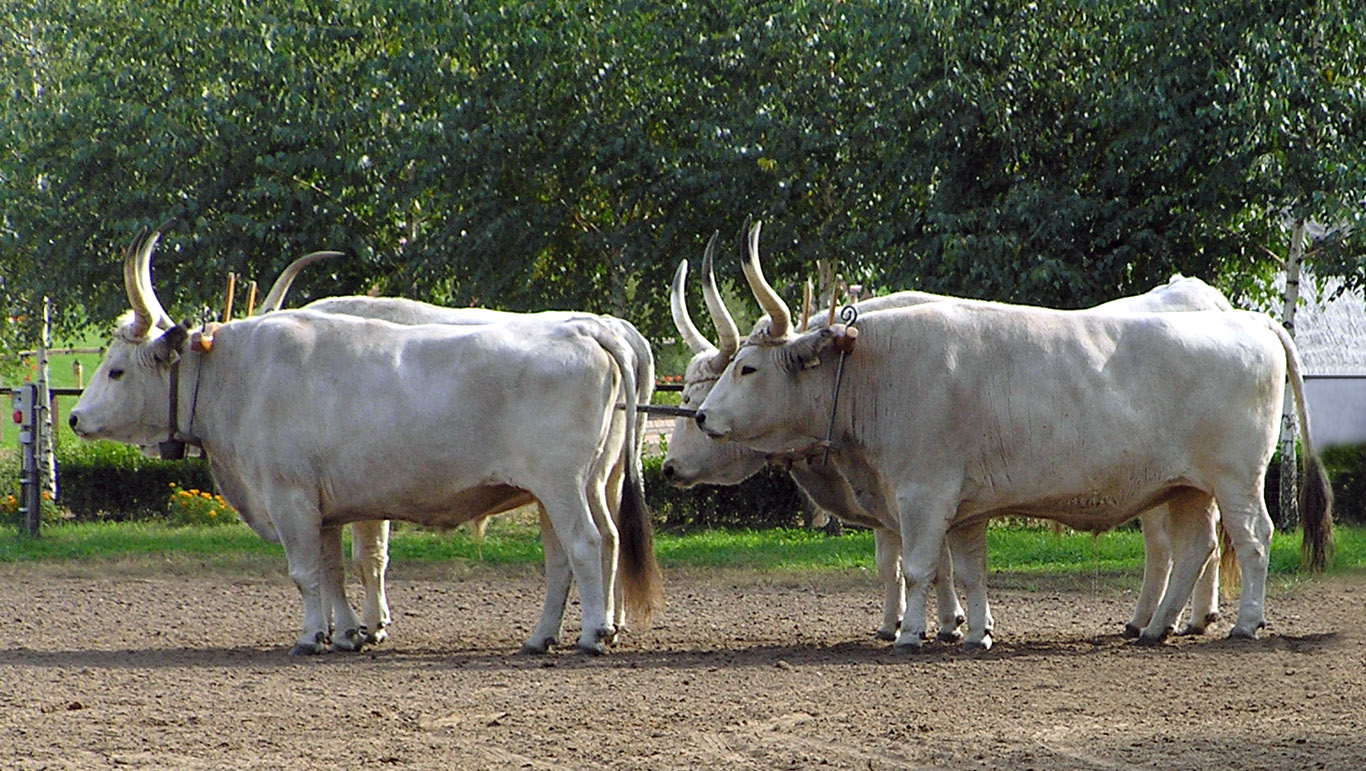
A yoked team of four

Hungarian Grey cattle are robust, slender and tall. They have high muscle content and marbled meat. Bulls stand about 150 cm at the withers, and weigh some 800 kg; cows average 135 cm in height and 525 kg in weight.

The coat colour ranges from silvery-white to ash-grey; males are usually darker than cows, with a black scrotum and eyes ringed with black. The skin is pigmented and grey. As in other Podolic breeds, the calves are born reddish and become grey at about six months old. The horns are long and curved and are directed upwards in a lyre shape; they may be some 70 to 80 cm in length.

The Hungarian Grey shares with indicine cattle some genetic characteristics relating to milk proteins including casein, and to amplified fragment length polymorphism marker haplotypes. It does not otherwise show any marked similarity to zebuine cattle.

== Use ==
The Hungarian Grey is reared for beef. It is slow to develop, but the meat is low in fat and is suitable for the manufacture of beef salami and beef sausages. It is included in the Ark of Taste of the international Slow Food Foundation.

Herds of the cattle function as a tourist attraction in the Hortobágy National Park and other Hungarian national parks. Some may be found elsewhere, such as in Bocfölde in western Hungary. These herds serve as gene banks, due to their reported resistance to cattle diseases which affect more highly bred cattle types.

== See also ==
- National symbols of Hungary
