= Auguste Auspitz-Kolar =

Bohemian-born Austrian pianist and composer

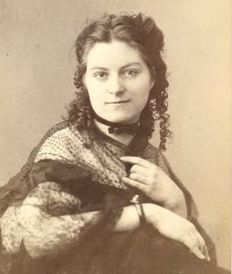
Auguste Auspitz-Kolár in 1867

Auguste Auspitz-Kolár (19 March 1844 – 26 December 1878 was a Bohemian-born Austrian pianist and composer.

The daughter of Josef Jiří Kolár, actor, director and translator, and Anna Manetinská Kolárová, a singer, she was born Auguste Kolár in Prague and studied piano with Bedřich Smetana and then Josef Proksch in Prague and with Wilhelmine Clauss-Szarvady in Paris. In 1865, she travelled to Vienna where she performed in concerts held by the Hellmesberger Quartet. She also performed in concert with Clara Schumann. Auspitz-Kolár performed in London during the summers of 1868 and 1870.

In 1868, she married physician Heinrich Auspitz. She continued performing until 1875 when her third child Hans was born and she become seriously ill. Her health never returned and she died three years latter in Vienna.

== External resources ==
- Auguste Auspitz-Kolár papers, ca. 1858-1902 (her personal papers) in the Music & Recorded Sound Division of The New York Public Library for the Performing Arts
