= Murad Alam =

American physician, scientist, and author

Murad Alam is an American physician, scientist, and author. He is a frequently cited expert in the area of cosmetic dermatology, and noted for his research in areas of cosmetic repair and barbed suture use. His work has also extended to serving on expert panels such as those dedicated to merkel cell cancer and guidelines of care. He is the current president of the Blade and Light Society for dermatologic surgeons and serves as the Chief of the Section of Cutaneous and Aesthetic Surgery at Northwestern University's Feinberg School of Medicine. Alam serves as a regular figure, in local and national news outlets, on discussions of skin care and skin cancer. He is an outspoken advocate of skin health.

Alam has both an undergraduate and MD degree from Yale University. He did his medical residency at Columbia University. Alam is a long-standing member of the World Association of Medical Editors and is the current treasurer for this global organization.
