= Lazar Krestin =

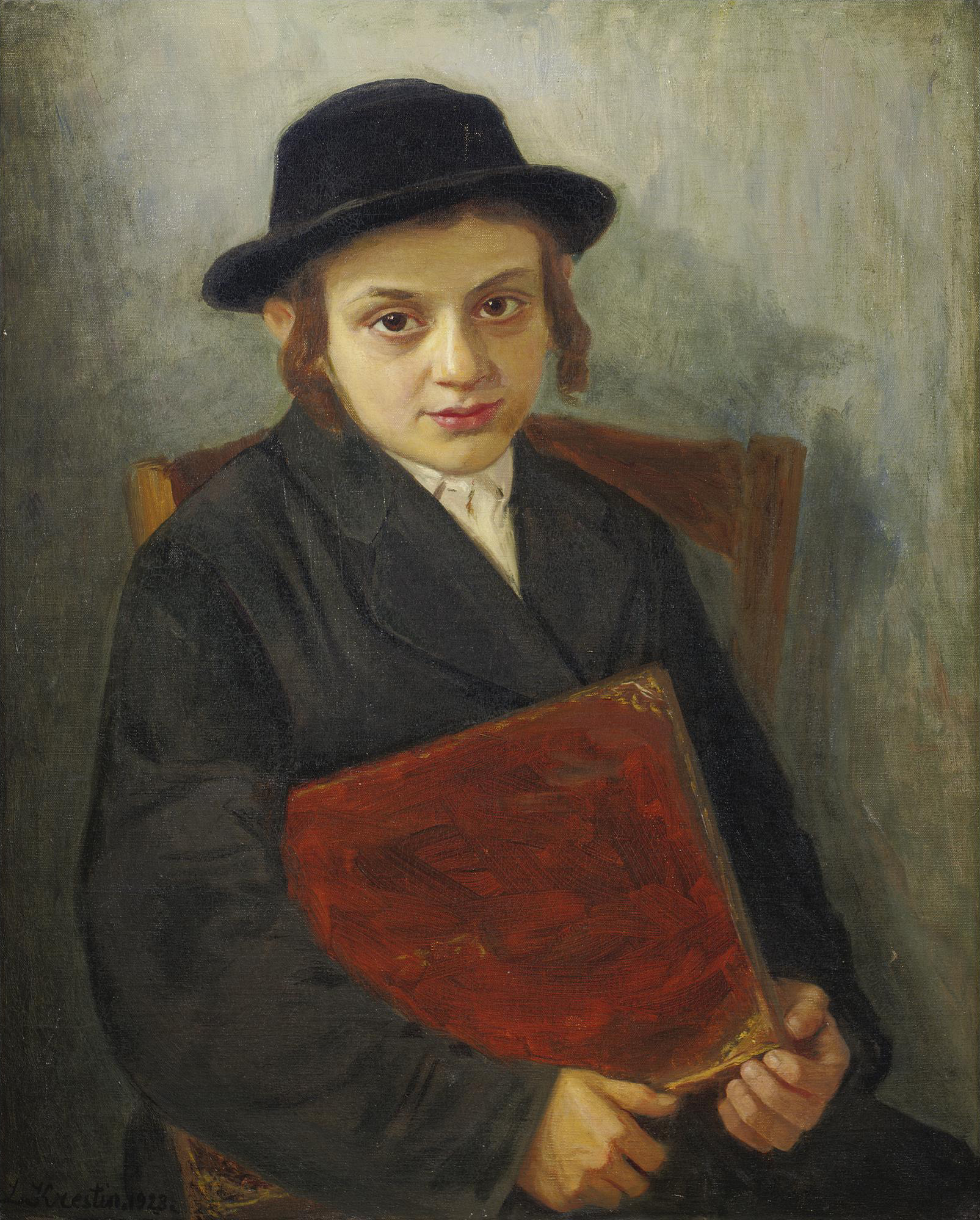
Portrait of a Jewish Boy (1923)

Lazar Krestin (10 September 1868, Kaunas – 28 February 1938, Vienna) was an artist famous in the German art world for Judaic genre scenes and his many sober portraits of Eastern European Jews. He was also a noted Zionist.

His father was a Talmud teacher. His first lessons were at the drawing school in Vilnius, followed by studies at the Academy of Fine Arts, Vienna and the Academy of Fine Arts, Munich and he was one of the most prominent students of Isidor Kaufmann. He worked in Munich, Vienna and Odessa before going to Jerusalem in 1910 at the request of Bezalel Academy of Arts and Design founder, Boris Schatz. He later returned to Vienna and is buried in the Zentralfriedhof.

== Sources ==
- *Österreichisches Biographisches Lexikon 1815–1950, Bd. 4 (Lfg. 18, 1968), S. 262.
