= Podolica =

Italian breed of cattle

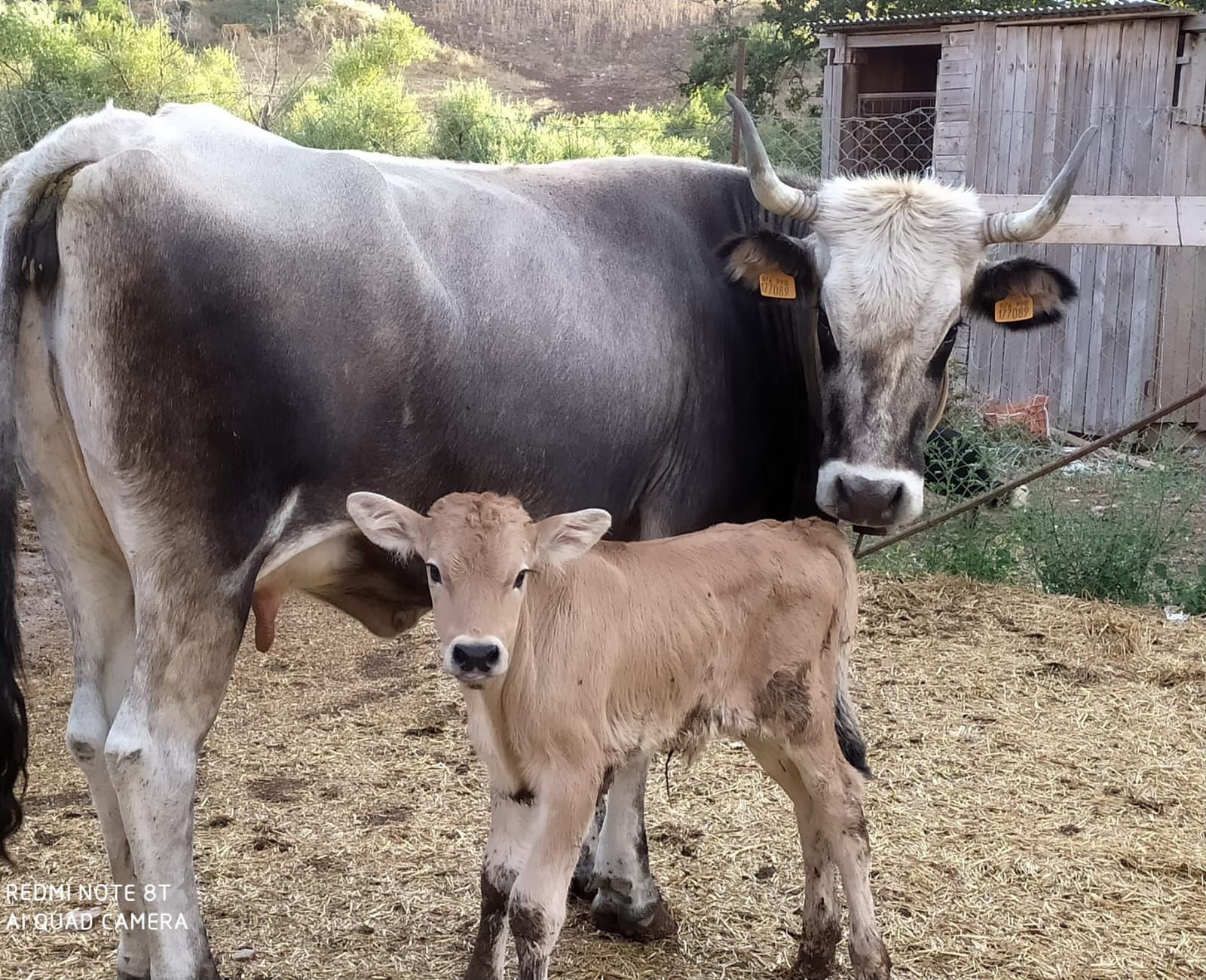
- Cow and calf

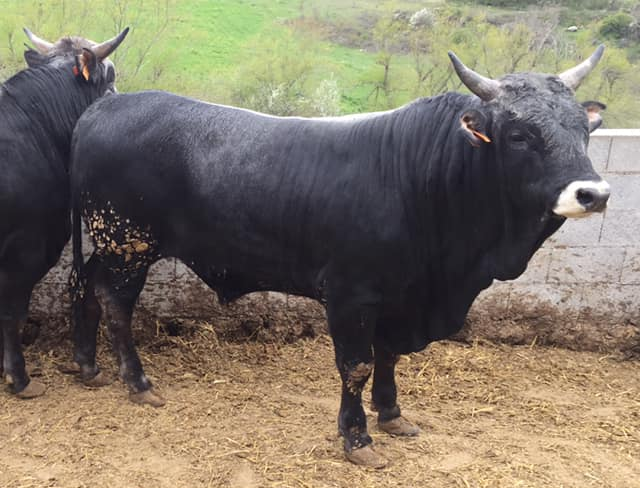
- Bullock in Basilicata
- Conservation status: FAO (2007): not listed; DAD-IS (2024): not at risk
- Country of origin: Italy
- Distribution: Abruzzo; Basilicata; Calabria; Campania; Molise; Puglia
- Standard: ANABIC
- Use: triple-purpose: draught, beef, milk

Traits
- Weight: Male: 800 kg; Female: 650 kg
- Height: Male: 150 cm; Female: 145 cm
- Skin colour: black
- Coat: grey, black switch
- Horn status: horned
- Cattle; Bos (primigenius) taurus

The Podolica is an Italian breed of domestic cattle. It belongs to the Podolic group of grey cattle. It is raised in the southern Italian regions of Abruzzo, Basilicata, Calabria, Campania, Molise and Puglia. It was formerly distributed throughout most of mainland Italy and as far as Istria. It was in the past bred principally as a draught animal. With the mechanisation of agriculture following the Second World War, demand for draught oxen disappeared; the Podolica is now raised for meat and – to a lesser extent – for milk.

== History ==
The origins of the Podolica are not known. As with other European grey cattle, it has been suggested that it derives from cattle of the Podolian (Ukrainian) steppes of eastern Europe, possibly brought to Italy by invading Goths in the fifth century AD or by the Lombard king Agilulf in the sixth century. This hypothesis is based on the zoological theories of the nineteenth century, going back to the Bos taurus podolicus of Johann Andreas Wagner. It is not supported by modern genetic, zoological or archaeological research.

There were regional and other types of Italian grey cattle throughout much of mainland Italy: the Abruzzese, the Calabrese, the Montanara, the Murgese, the Pugliese, the Pugliese del Basso Veneto and others. These extended as far as Istria – now part of Croatia – where it is now recognised as a separate breed, the Istrian or Boškarin.

The name "Podolico" for grey cattle came into use in Italy from the early twentieth century. A breed society and a herd-book were established in either 1931 or 1937. The need for a genealogical register was recognised in 1976; it was established in 1984, and a breed standard drawn up from observation of about 15000 animals. In 1986 the standards of selection were modified to allow meat production to be favoured over other characteristics.

In the 1930s there were some 630000 of the cattle. The total population in 2008 was estimated at 100000 head, of which about 25000 were recorded in the herd-book. At the end of 2013 the total number registered in the herdbook was 27509, including 391 registered bulls; more than 80% of the registered stock was in Basilicata and Campania.

It is considered to be at risk from indiscriminate cross-breeding with bulls of specialised meat breeds.

== Characteristics ==
The Podolica is a rustic breed capable of surviving on harsh terrain and poor pasture. It can exploit food sources that would not otherwise be used, including stubble, scrub, maquis and woodland undergrowth. The animals are fed hay and straw only in winter.

The coat colour shows pronounced sexual dimorphism: cows are pale grey, tending to white, while males are darker and may be almost black. As in other breeds of grey cattle, the calves are born wheat-coloured but become grey at about three months. The skin is black, as are the natural openings. The horns are light, lyre-shaped in cows, half-moon-shaped in bulls; they are slate-grey in young animals, becoming pale at the base and dark at the tip with maturity. The breed is of medium size and weight; the skeleton is light. The average height at the withers is 145 cm for cows and 150 cm for bulls; average weights are 650 kg and 800 kg respectively.

== Use ==
The cattle were in the past kept mainly for draught work; meat and milk production were secondary to this. After the Second World War the progressive mechanisation of agriculture meant that demand for draught oxen disappeared. The cattle are now raised mainly for meat; in some areas they are also kept for milk.

Calves are weaned no sooner than four months; they are normally sent to slaughter at 15–16 months, at which time they weigh 300–350 kg; bullocks may be slaughtered at about two years old, at a live weight of approximately 500 kg.

The average milk yield is low; a figure of 1500 kg was cited in the 1950s. The milk is used to make caciocavallo; the Caciocavallo Podolico del Gargano from the Gargano Peninsula in the province of Foggia is made only from it.
