= Boškarin =

European breed of cattle

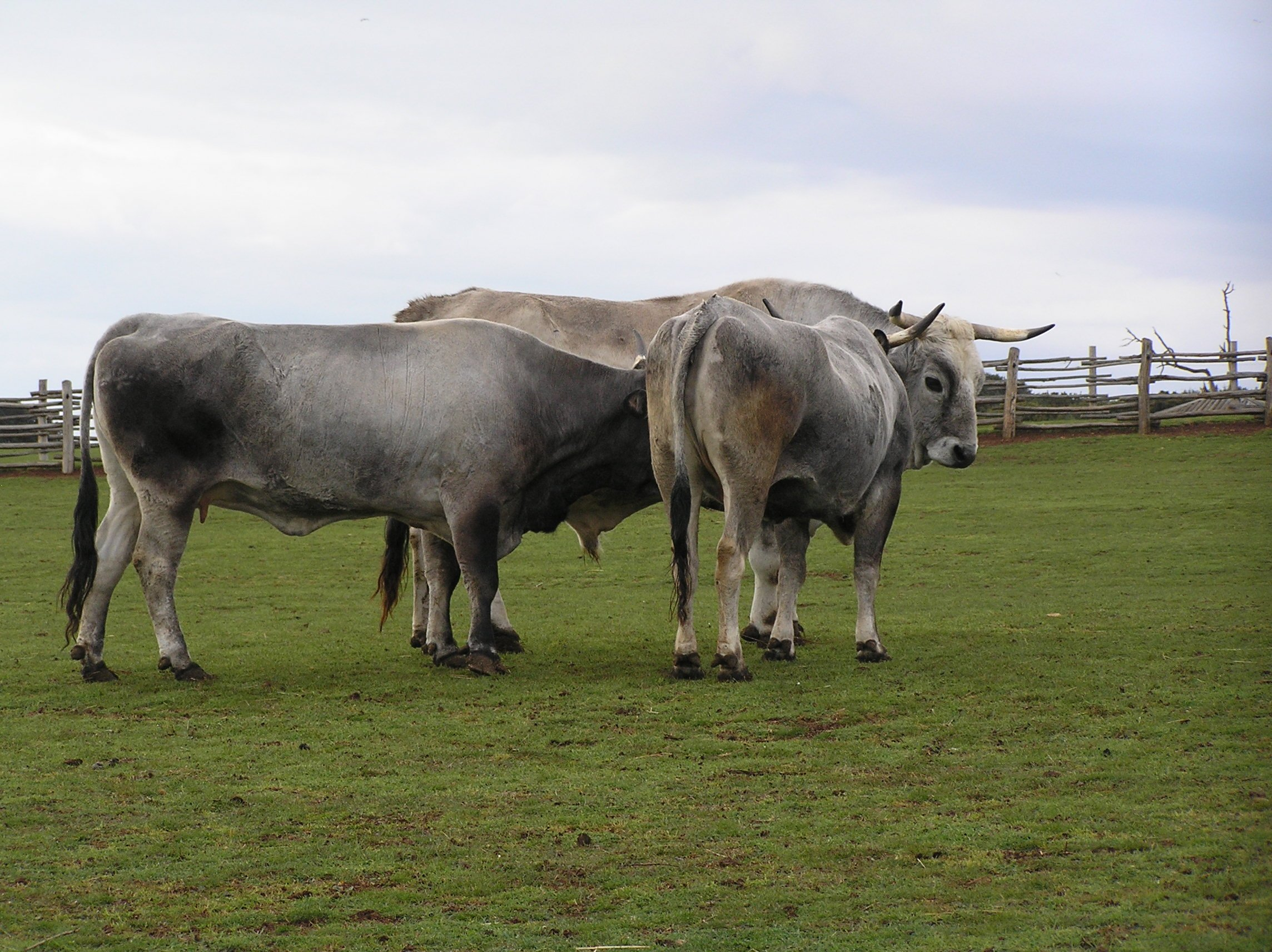
- Istrian cattle
- Other names: Istrian cattle
- Country of origin: Croatia, Slovenia
- Distribution: Istrian peninsula
- Use: Dairy and meat (ground beef and roast beef)

Traits
- Weight: 1.5 ton
- Coat: Plain gray
- Horn status: Horned, large horns

Notes
- Dual-purpose breed, used for both dairy and beef.

Boškarin or Istrian cattle is a breed of dairy cattle originating from Istria (northwestern Croatia and southwestern Slovenia). The breed had almost completely disappeared, but thanks to the establishment of the Federation of Istrian Cattle Breeders it was saved, and today has a population of 350 cows and 8 bulls. Today the saved cattle are farmed for gourmet purposes in Istria, where the boškarin is hailed as a true gourmet delicacy.

== Description ==
Boškarin looks rustic, with a coat that is gray in color. The tip of the muzzle is white. The Boškarin, with its muscular and strong physique has good properties and has traditionally been used as both a draft animal for both field work and transport but also for milk production. A bull or ox weighs around 1000 kilograms while a cow weighs between 550 and 650 kilograms. Characteristic of the cattle are also its large horns and blue-gray tongue. The color of the boškarin is preferably gray. The cows produce between 800 and 1200 liters of milk per year.

== Origins ==
The Boškarin is said to be descended from bulls of the Podolica breed. The breed belongs to the gray steppe branch.

== Threats and conservation ==
As early as the 1960s, there were around 60,000 specimens of Boškarin left in Istria, but when new breeds were introduced to increase efficiency in agriculture, they interbred. In the early 1990s, only a few purebred specimens remained in Istria. By then, Boškarins had completely disappeared from the Slovenian part of Istria. Work was then started by private individuals and interest groups to save the Boškarins from extinction. Today there are at least 350 cows, 18 bulls and 43 oxen scattered over Istria.

== Gallery ==
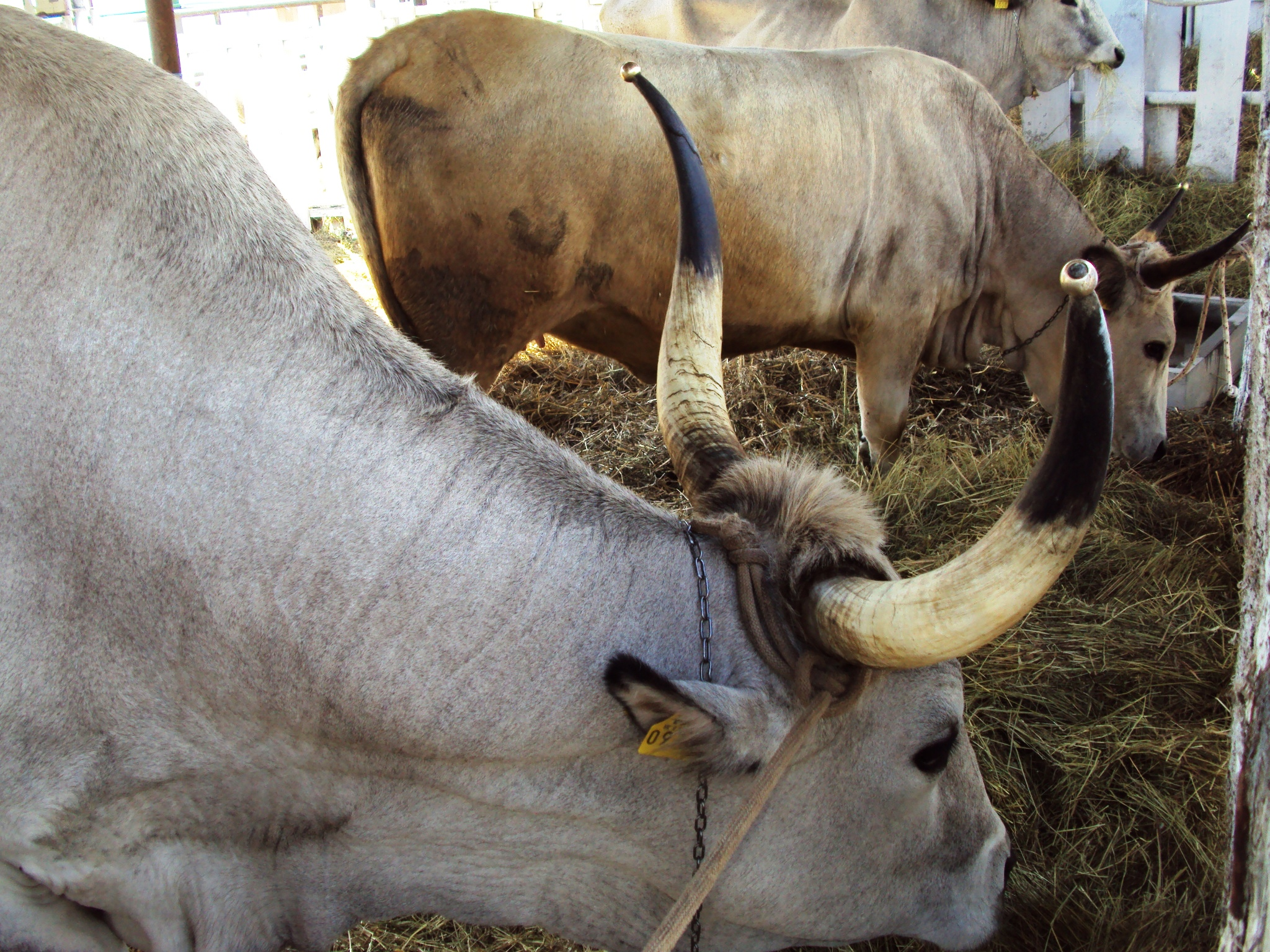
Boškarin, detail of a specimen with horns relatively medium-sized.

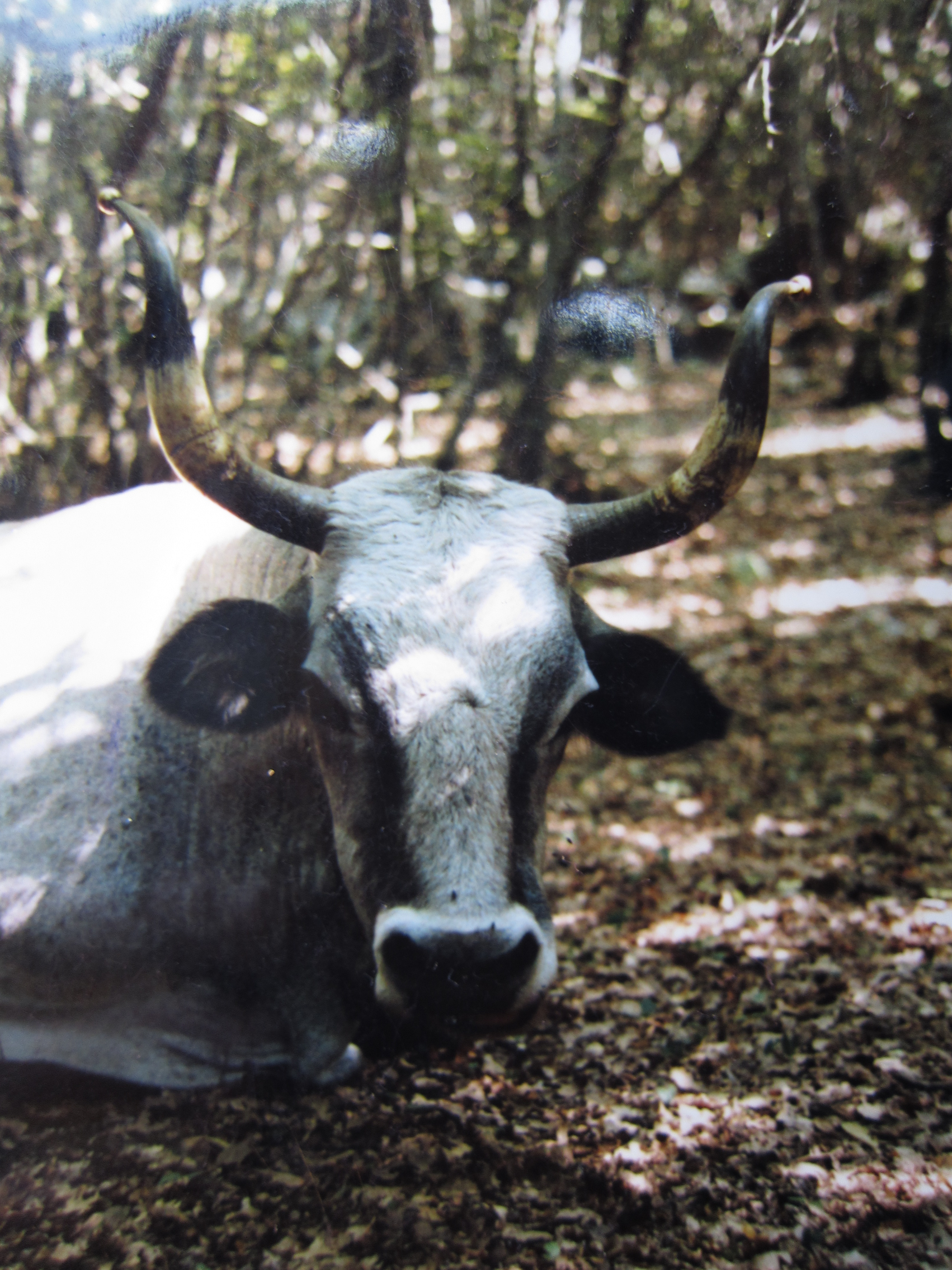
Head seen from the front.

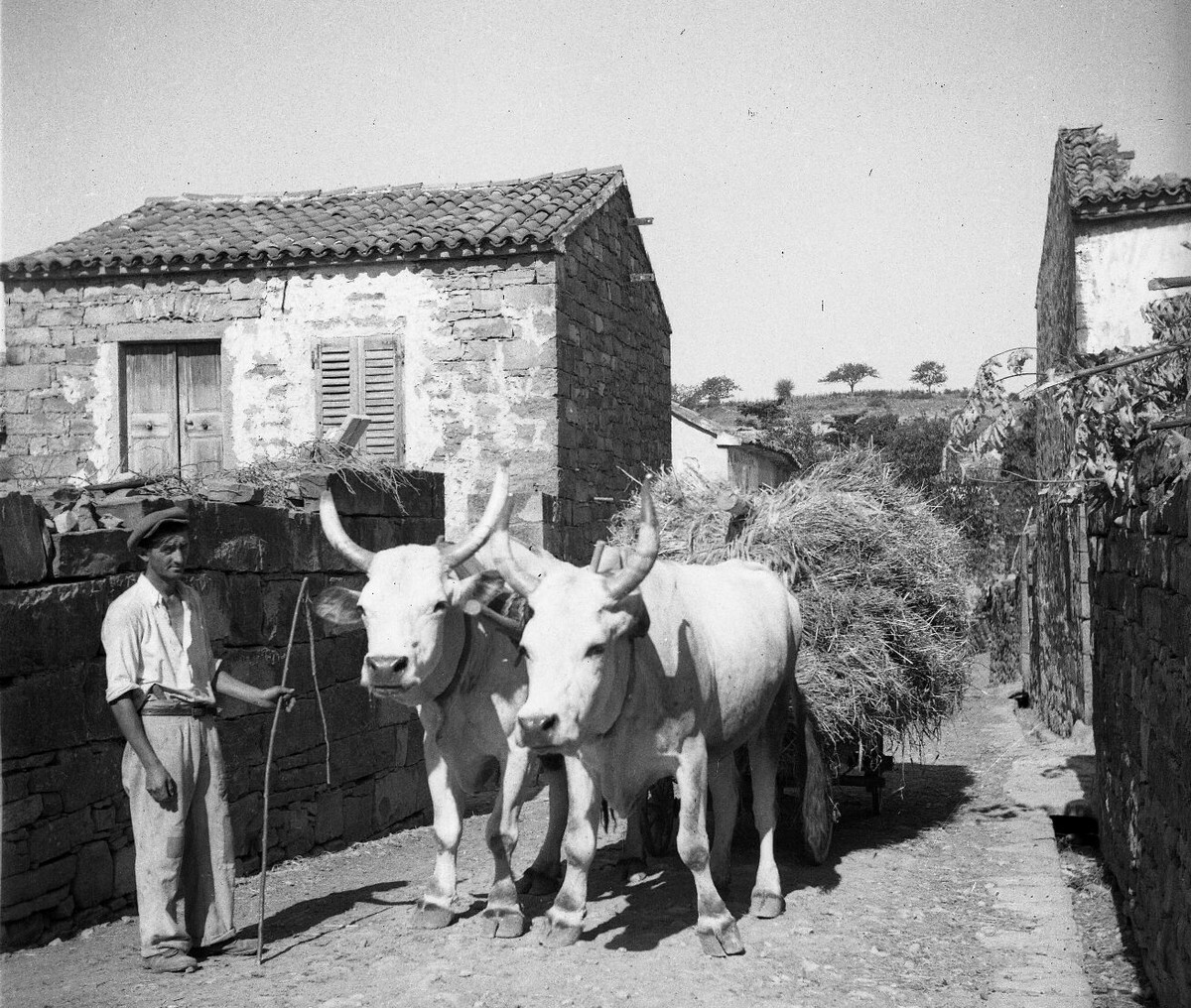
A pair of Istrian oxen pulling a hay cart.

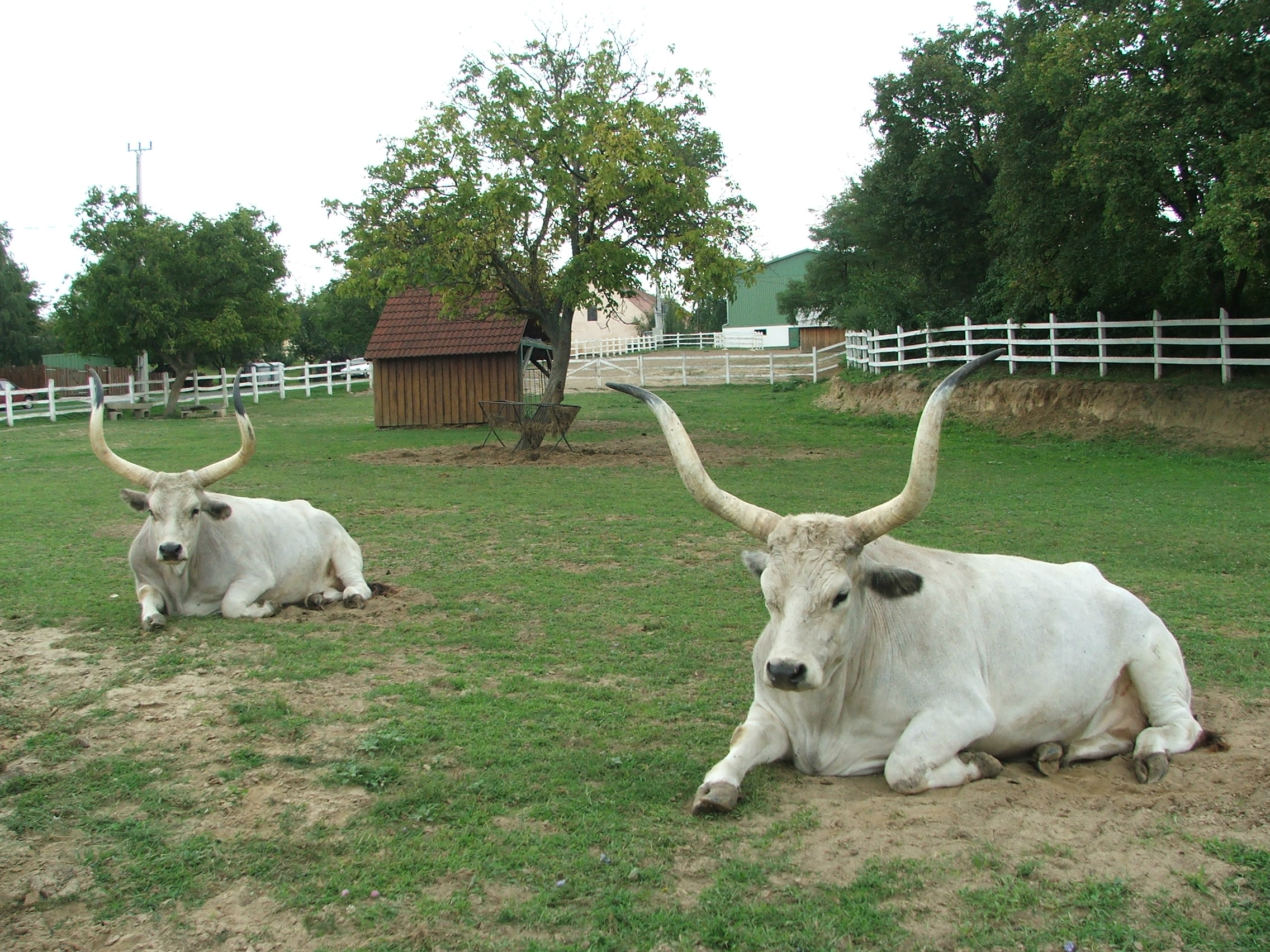
Two specimens.

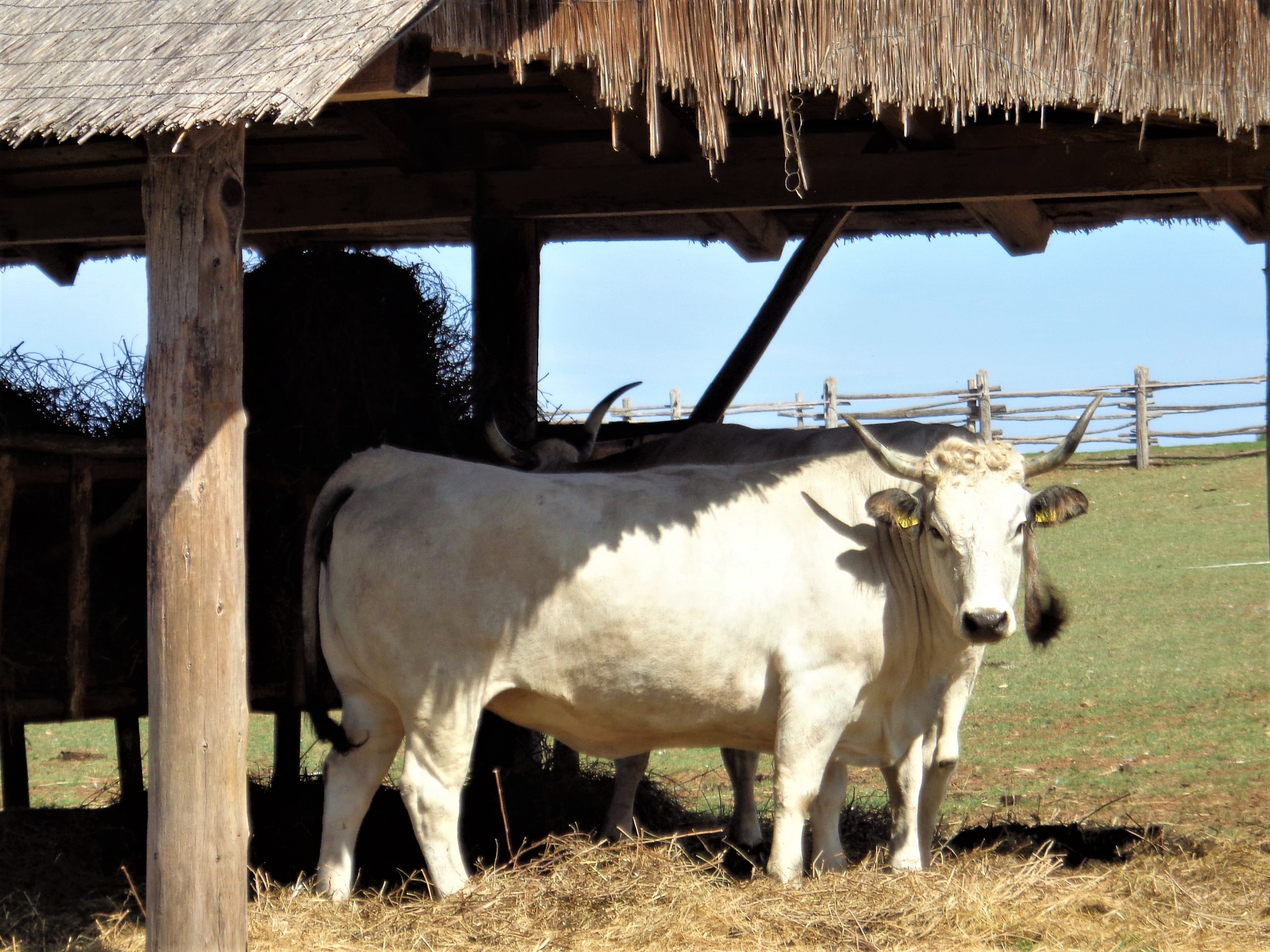
Boškarin in the Brijuni Islands National Park

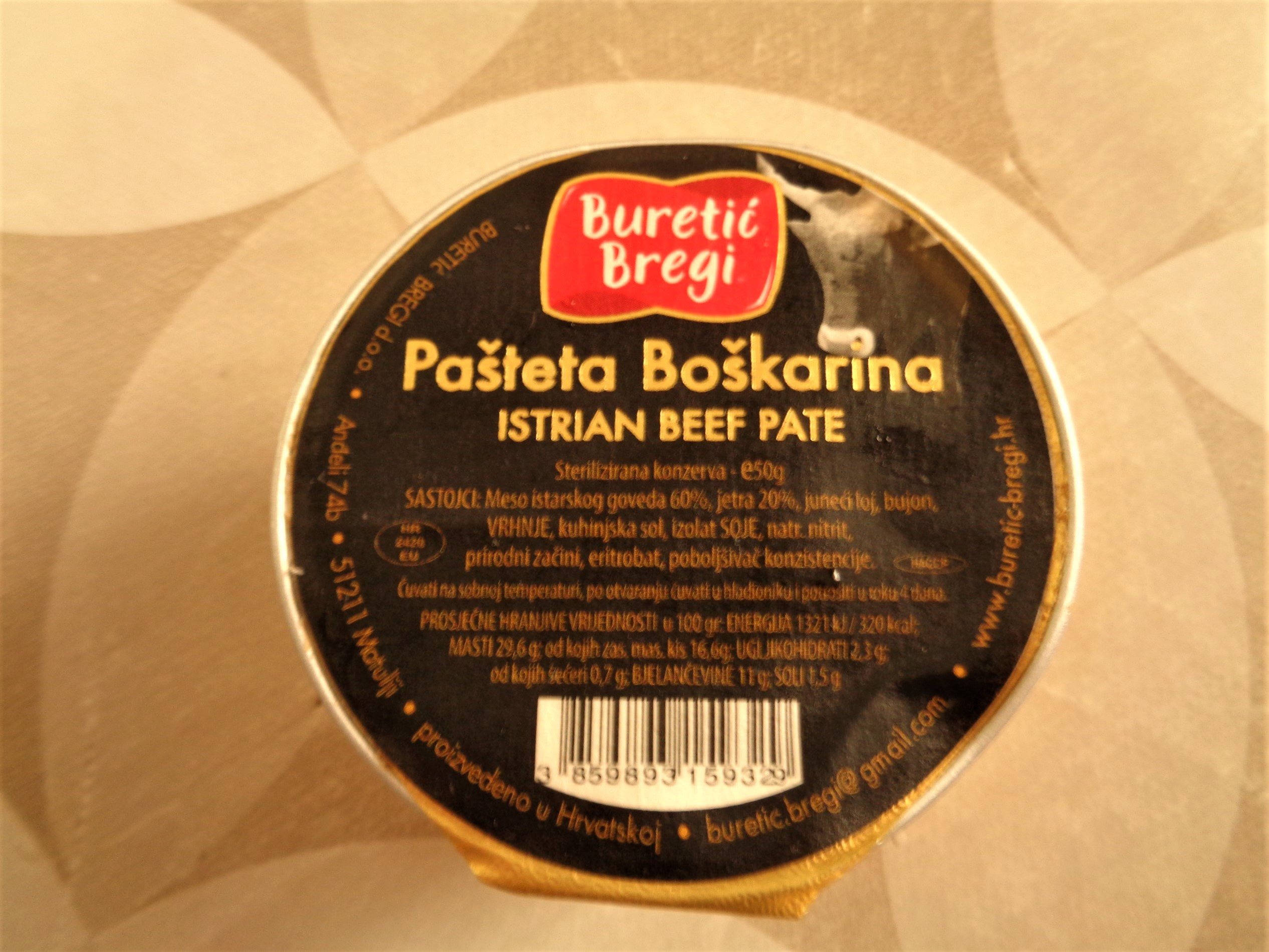
Pâté made from Boškarin
