= Carl Wedl =

Austrian pathologist (1815–1891)

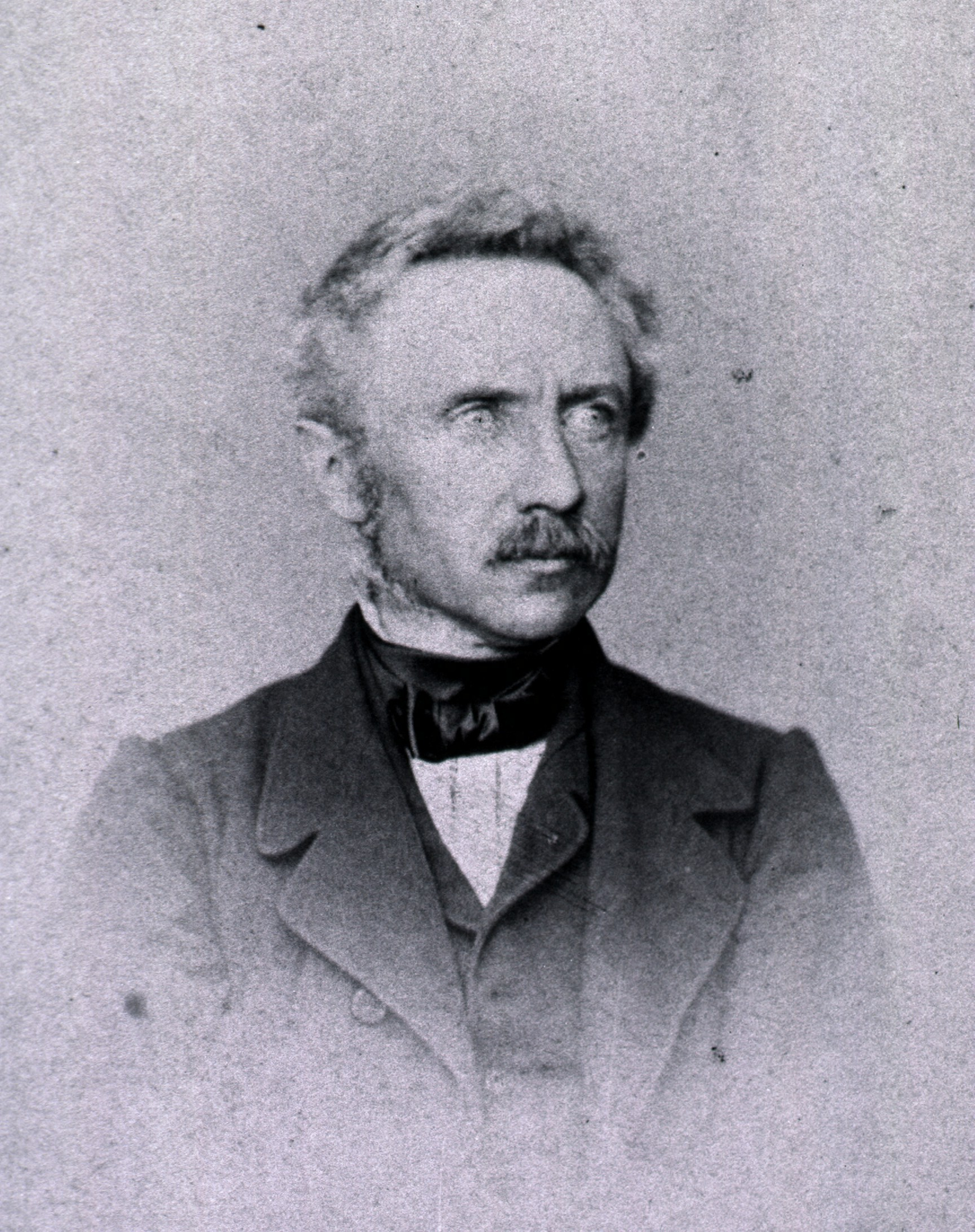
Carl Wedl

Carl Wedl (14 October 1815 – 21 September 1891) was a pathologist who was a native of Vienna, Austrian Empire.

In 1841 he obtained his doctorate in Vienna, and subsequently practiced medicine in Ischl and Salzburg. In 1844 he took a scientific journey to France and England, afterwards returning to Vienna, where he performed histological research. With assistance from Karl Rokitansky (1804–1878), he received his habilitation in 1849. In 1853 he became an associate professor, and in 1872 was appointed professor of histology at the University of Vienna. Some of his well-known students were Heinrich Auspitz (1834–1885), Moritz Kaposi (1837–1902) and Salomon Stricker (1834–1898).

Wedl is largely remembered for his work in microscopic pathology and histology. He made contributions in the fields of helminthology, neurology and ophthalmology, and was one of the first physicians to apply cell theory to pathology of the eye. The eponymous "Wedl cells" are named after him, defined as dysplastic bladder-like fibers in the crystalline lens of the eye. Drusen, the hallmark of AMD, were first described in 1854 by Wedl. Wedl named them colloid bodies of the choroid and thought that they were incompletely developed cells, because they had no cell membrane or nucleus. The genus Wedlia (Cobbold 1860) is named after him, as are the species Didymosulcus wedli (Ariola, 1902), Ascaris wedli (Stossich, 1896) and Paroneirodes wedli (Pietschmann 1926).

Wedl was the author of numerous books and articles, a few of which have been translated into English. He died on 21 September 1891, bequeathing his estate to the Vienna Academy of Sciences.

== Written works ==
- Beiträge zur Lehre von den Hämatozoen, 1850 - Contributions to the study of hematozoa.
- Beiträge zur Anatomie des zweibuckeligen Kameeles (Camelus bactrianus),1852 (with Franz Müller) - Contributions to the anatomy of the Bactrian camel.
- Grundzüge der pathologischen Histologie, 1854, translated and edited by George Busk as "Rudiments of Pathological Histology", 1855
- Über das Nervensystem der Nematoden 1855 - - On the nervous system of the nematode.
- Über einige Nematoden, 1856 - On some nematodes.
- Charakteristik mehrerer Grössentheils neuer Tänien, 1856 - treatise on Taenia.
- Über ein in den Mägen des Rindes Vorkommendes Epiphyt 1858 -
- Anatomische Beobachtungen über Trematoden, 1858 - Anatomical observations on trematodes.
- Über die bedeutung der in den schalen von manchen acephalen und gasteropoden vorkommenden canäle, 1859 -
- Beiträge zur Pathologie der Blutgefässe, 1859 - Contributions to the pathology of blood vessels.
- Über einen im Zahnbein und Knochen keimenden Pilz, 1864 - On bone and dentin in germinating fungi.
- Atlas zur Pathologie der Zähne, 1869 (with Moriz Heider and Joseph R von Metnitz) translated into English as "Atlas to the pathology of the teeth".
- Über die Haut-Sensibilitätsbezirke der einzelnen Rückenmarksnervenpaare, 1869 (with Ludwig Türck) - On sensitivity areas of each spinal nerve pair.
- Histologische Mittheilungen. Zur Anatomie der Milz, 1871 - Histological Mittheilungen. On the anatomy of the spleen.
- Pathologie der Zähne, mit besonderer Rücksicht auf Anatomie und Physiologie, 1870, translated into English by W.E. Boardman (with notes by T.B. Hitchcock) as "The pathology of the teeth, with special reference to their anatomy and physiology", 1872.
- Zur pathologischen Anatomie des Glaukoms, 1882 - The pathological anatomy of glaucoma.
- Der Aberglaube und die Naturwissenschaften, 1883 - Superstition and natural sciences.
- Pathologische Anatomie des Auges, 1886 - Pathological anatomy of the eye.

== See also ==
- Vienna School of Dermatology
