= Heinrich Auspitz =

Jewish Austrian dermatologist

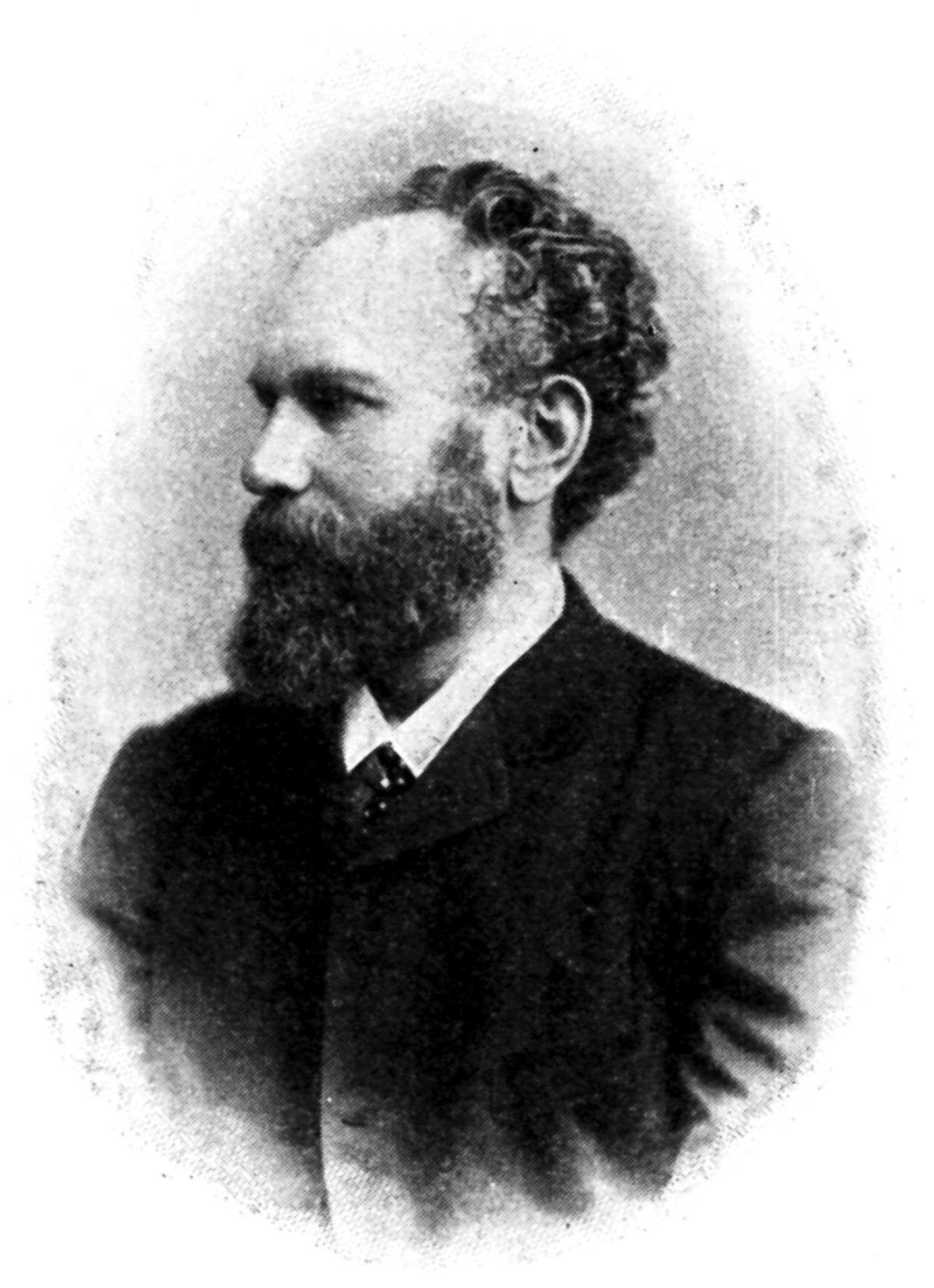
Heinrich Auspitz

Carl Heinrich Auspitz (2 September 1835 in Nikolsburg, Moravia – 22 May 1886 in Vienna) was a Jewish dermatologist. He was the husband of pianist Auguste Auspitz-Kólar (1843–1878).

He was a member of the famous Moravian-Austrian Auspitz Family. Heinrich was a son of Jewish surgeon Moritz (1803, Nikolsburg – 1880). His younger brother Leopold (1838, Nikolsburg – 1907) was an Imperial & Royal Generalmajor and writer. In 1840, Moritz was given a job at a Jewish hospital in Vienna, and allowed better education to his sons.

Trained at the University of Vienna, he specialized in dermatology and syphilis. He was part of the so-called Vienna School of Dermatology, and studied and worked with several eminent physicians of the time; Ernst Wilhelm (Ritter von) Brücke (1819, Berlin – 1892), Karel (Carl) Freiherr von Rokytanský (1804, Bohemia – 1878), Josef Škoda (1805, Bohemia –1881), Johann Ritter von Oppolzer (1808, Bohemia – 1871), and Ferdinand Ritter von Hebra (1816, Moravia –1880).

In 1863 he became a privat-docent of dermatology and syphilis, and during the following year began work in the histological institute of Carl Wedl. In 1872 he was named director of the general policlinic, and from 1875 onward, was an associate professor at the university.

A pioneer in tissue pathology, he described the pinpoint bleeding on removal of a psoriasis scale that bears his name: "Auspitz's sign". In 1885 he published an article involving mycosis fungoides titled "Ein Fall von Granuloma fungoides (Mycosis fungoides Alibert)".

Together with Philipp Josef Pick (1834-1910), he founded first German-language magazine for dermatology, the "Archiv für Dermatologie und Syphilis" (1869). In 1882 he became a member of the German Academy of Sciences Leopoldina. In May 1886 he died from a heart condition, and was interred in the Wiener Zentralfriedhof.

== Award ==
Since 2005, the "Heinrich Auspitz Preis" has been awarded by the Wyeth and Pfizer Corporation Austria in order to promote scientific research in the field of dermatology.

== Selected works ==
- Anatomie des Blattenprocesses. Virchows Archiv für pathologische Anatomie und Physiologie und für klinische Medicin, Berlin, 1863.
- Die Lehren vom Syphilitischen Contagium und ihre thatsächliche Begründung; 384 pages. Wien, W. Braumüller, 1866.
- Die Zelleninfiltrationen der Lederhaut bei Lupus, Syphilis und Skrophylose. Medizinische Jahrbücher, Wien, 1866.
- Über das Verhältnis der Oberhaut zur Papillarschicht, insbesondere bei pathologischen Zuständen der Haut. Archiv für Dermatologie und Syphilis, Berlin, 1870; 2: 24-58.
