= Auspitz's sign =

Dermatologic sign

Auspitz's sign is the appearance of punctate bleeding spots when psoriasis scales are scraped off, named after Heinrich Auspitz. It may also be seen in Darier's disease and actinic keratosis.

Importantly, as with many eponymous clinical signs, Heinrich Auspitz was not the first to discover the sign named after him. It was Auspitz's mentor at the Medical University of Vienna (Ferdinand von Hebra) and Parisian dermatologist Marie Devergie who first noted the punctate hemorrhages underlying psoriasis scales.

This pinpoint bleeding results from a thinning of the epidermal layer overlying the tips of the dermal papillae. Blood vessels within the papillae are dilated and tortuous, and often bleed readily when the scale is removed.

Although classically associated with psoriasis, subsequent research has found Auspitz's sign to be of very little diagnostic value for the disease. This is because several other diseases display the sign (including Darier's disease and actinic keratosis). Additionally, only a minority of psoriasis scales show it when removed (<18%). This overall indicates that Auspitz's sign is neither highly sensitive nor specific for psoriasis, and thus should only be used in combination with other findings to make a diagnosis.
