= History of dermatology =

The history of dermatology concerns the development of the practice of researching, defining and treating skin diseases, from ancient times to the present. The field has its origin in the earliest forms of medicine, later becoming a distinct field with its own specialised practitioners and researchers.

== Ancient ==
=== Mesopotamia ===
Readily visible alterations of the skin surface have been recognised since the dawn of history. Among the first to take an interest in skin diseases were the Mesopotamian peoples, who sought to understand the reasons for these problems, often resorting to explanations rooted in religion, astrology and divination, and were the first to observe and define various dermatopathies. Skin conditions were considered a sign of divine punishment, the actions of demons and spirits, or as the result of black magic.

One of the most influential sources of understanding views on skin conditions in Mesopotamia comes from the Babylonian chief scholar Esagil-kin-aplim, who wrote a diagnostic manual called Sakikkū. One passage describes a complex skin condition which is associated with a sexual encounter. Another work, Alandimmû, observes the human physical appearance, with a section dedicated to dermal marks, such as moles, and spots.

While matching the descriptions of diseases in the few surviving cuneiform medical texts to specific ailments is challenging, it appears likely that Babylonians and Assyrians were the first to define and describe warts, pustules and scabies in writing. It is also possible to draw some conclusions about their attitude to skin conditions. Doctors of the era clearly sought to define disease according to certain criteria, using observations such as such as heat, smell, breath and bodily fluids, to help draw a diagnostic conclusion.

=== Egypt ===
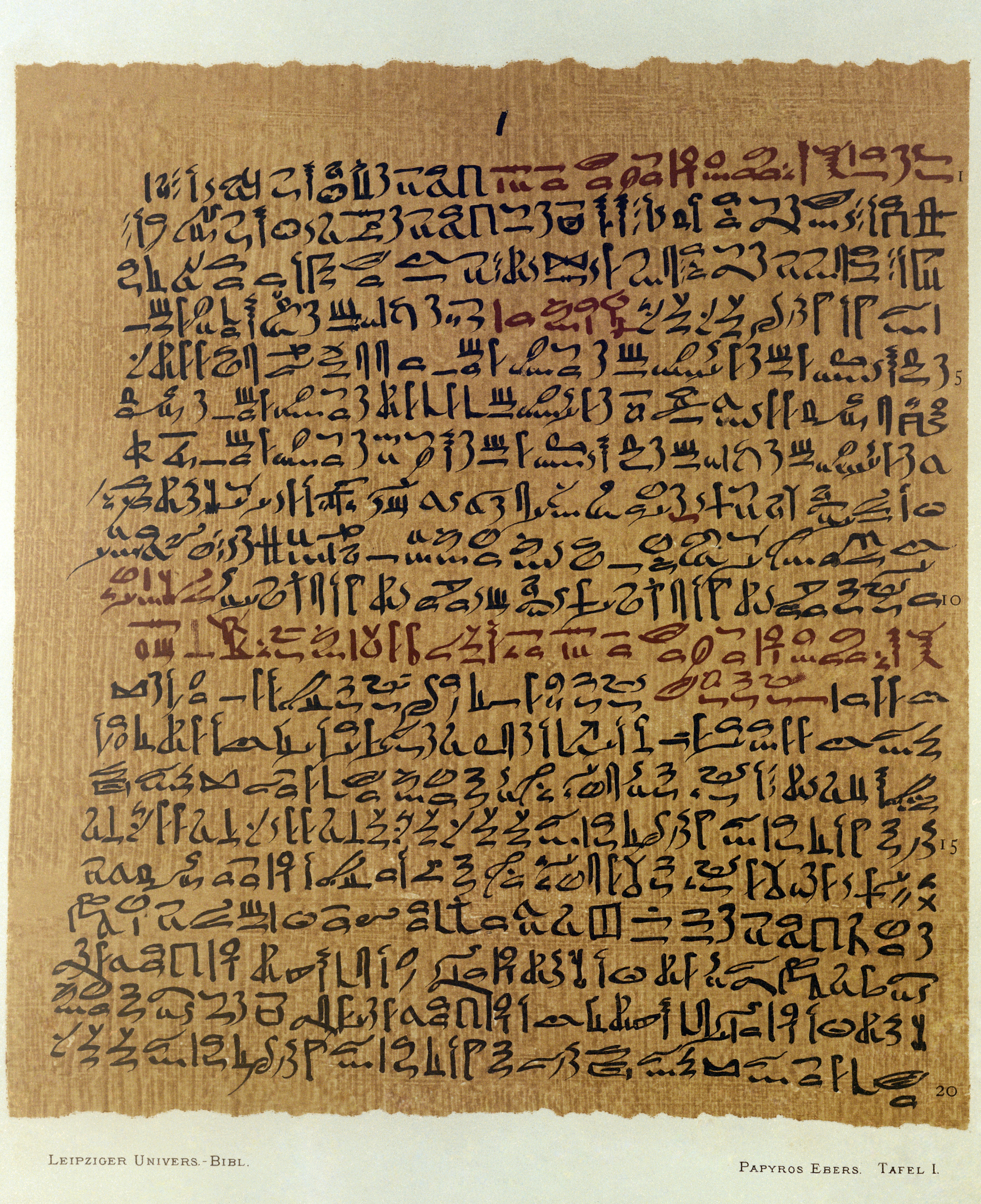
Reproduction of the Ebers Papyrus

Among the oldest preserved medical documents relevant to skin diseases are the ancient Egyptian Smith Papyrus and Ebers Papyrus dating to c. 1600 BCE and c. 1550 BCE respectively, though it is likely their contents were copied and passed down with their ultimate origins being much older folk remedies.

These scrolls describe various diseases, including skin complaints such as ulcers, burn wounds, rashes, and tumours, as well as medical techniques on how to recognise and treat the diseases. Many of the treatments involved magical incantations, the application of herbs, or formulations of ingredients for medicines or ointments, as well as surgical procedures, such as skin grafts.

Ancient Egyptians believed in a form of proto-humorism, that skin diseases were a symptom of health problems inside the body, caused by a blockage in the flow of bodily fluids. This turned the fluids into pain-making substances that could cause diseases anywhere in the body.

While many of the procedures do not resemble those prescribed by modern medicine, the papyri are notable for their evidence of an early system of thorough inquiry into skin diseases, recommending a systematic examination, diagnosis and treatment, something that would later be more formalised by Greek schools of medicine.

=== Greece and Rome ===
Ancient Greek physicians adopted many treatments of the Egyptians, with the likes of Homer and Diodorus attesting to their respect of Egyptian medicine, though they rejected the use of incantations as a method of treatment. However, Greek and Roman medicine did not see the skin as an organ in itself, but rather a mere covering for the body. Similarly to the Egyptians, they viewed skin diseases as merely a representation of a humoral imbalance.

Greek medicine, with its focus on the harmony between external beauty and internal goodness, laid the foundation for dermatological practices, emphasizing a healthy diet and physical activity. Empedocles of Agrigento made early inroads into understanding skin diseases and the concept of cutaneous respiration, suggesting the skin's role in gas exchange similar to the lungs.

Hippocrates described skin diseases and proposed the first classification of skin diseases with two categories: diseases of the skin itself (idiopathic) and diseases due to an imbalance of humors that a merely manifested on the skin (exanthematic). Around a century later, his work would be compiled into the Corpus Hippocraticum, which described the anatomy and physiological processes of the skin, including sweating and glandular secretion.

Rome, while indebted to Greek medical knowledge, also absorbed insights from Etruscan magical medicine, which revered water's regenerative powers and utilized plants for their antiseptic properties. Key Roman figures in dermatology include Aulus Cornelius Celsus and Claudius Galen. Celsus, in his De Medicina, detailed various skin conditions with precise terminology, covering diseases like ulcers and leprosy. Galen expanded on dermatological diseases, especially those affecting the genitals, and explored the causes of hair color and the notion of sexually transmitted diseases.

Much of early Greek and Roman medicinal research was preserved only as Arabic-language copies, stored in Byzantine libraries.

== Middle ages and Renaissance ==
Arab and Persian dermatologists made a significant contribution to the science during the Middle Ages, with clinicians of the Islamic Golden Age such as Rhazes, Haly Abbas and Avicinna providing descriptions of diseases, including leprosy, vitiligo and smallpox. Avicinna wrote separate chapters in his Canon of Medicine on skin diseases, hair diseases and skin colour diseases.

In Europe, the Middle Ages saw the broader dissemination of ancient and foreign texts. Organised medicine was mostly the preserve of the Catholic Church, which used such texts to inform its medical practice. For example, the Benedictine monk Constantine the African assembled a vast collection of medical works, which he translated into Latin and used to inform his teaching at the Abbey of Monte Cassino, a major centre of learning in the 11th century.

The arrival of Constantine in Italy in 1077 coincided with the rise in notoriety of the Salerno Medical School, which had been founded in the 9th century, but was now increasingly influential. Trota of Salerno introduced new practices for treating the skin inspired by eastern societies and Rogerius first used the term lupus to describe the malar rash, with both physicians associated with the medical school. Rogerius in particular became renowned for his writing on the pathology and surgical treatment of diseases of the head, neck, trunk and extremities.

The Middle Ages in Europe saw a marked rise in infectious skin diseases, such as leprosy and plague, and the figures of surgeons and barbers (who, at the time, offered surgical interventions) emerging alongside physicians in the treatment of dermatological symptoms.

=== Renaissance ===
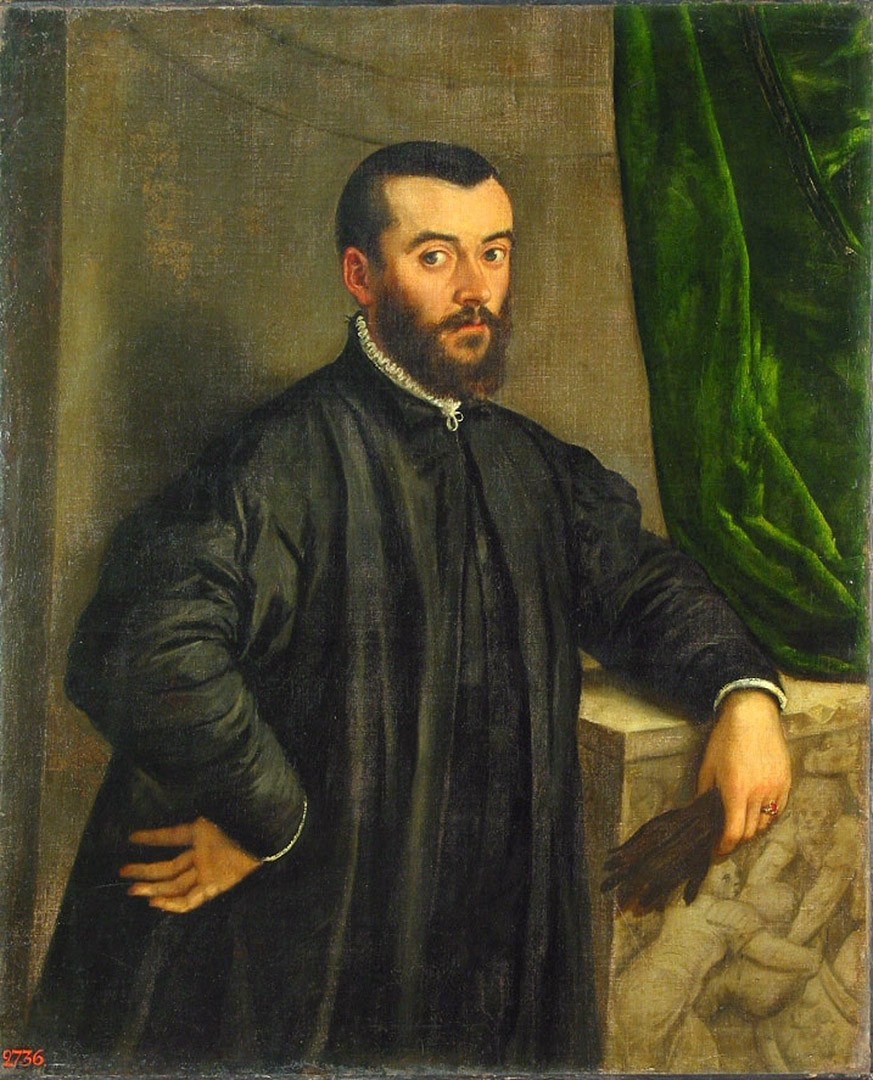
Portrait of Andreas Vesalius

The Renaissance period saw significant advancements in medical research. The previously taboo practice of postmortem dissection gradually became seen as necessary for the advancement of medicine.

A major development in the formalisation of the study of skin came from Andreas Vesalius, who first analysed and described the skin's substance, its layers, pores, fat and nerves. During his first public anatomical dissection in 1540, Vesalius showed and explained to the witnesses the difference between the 'inner skin' (hypodermis) and the 'outer skin' (epidermis) and their respective properties, and wrote about the subject in his seminal work on anatomy, De Humani Corporis Fabrica Libri Septem (On the fabric of the human body in seven books).

In 1572, Geronimo Mercuriali completed De morbis cutaneis (On the diseases of the skin), which sought to compile all medical knowledge on skin diseases and was the first scientific work to be dedicated entirely to dermatology. Unlike Vesalius, much of his writing relied on ancient sources of dubious veracity, and did not attempt to test those assumptions with original research. While Mercuriali was a generalist physician, he went on to write many texts focused on skin diseases, as well as De Decoration Liber (Book on Adornment) about the use of cosmetics, such as to hide blemishes.

There are many physicians which could be described as 'the first' dermatologist, such as English surgeon Daniel Turner. He wrote a treatise of skin diseases in 1714 called De Morbis Cutaneis, A Treatise of Diseases Incident to the Skin in Two Parts. Despite its Latin title and unusually for medical texts at the time, Turner wrote the book in English, and it was soon translated into French and German. He combined ancient descriptions of diseases and their treatments with references to research by contemporaries such as William Cowper, though Turner mostly recounts various cases that he encountered and how he treated them.

Turner's writing did not yet approach the scientific standard of modern medicine. He blamed humours for discolourations in the skin, and wrote on how pregnant women could inflict marks and deformities on their unborn children due to the "strong imagination or disappointed longings of the mother". This last theory was a particular point of criticism used against Turner, with Thomas Bateman referring to him as "credulous".

In 1799, Francesco Bianchi wrote the book Dermatologia which is the first comprehensive textbook of modern dermatology written for the students of medicine.

The development of optics allowed medical researchers to look at diseased skin in more detail.

== 19th century ==
In 1801 the first great school of dermatology became a reality at the famous Hôpital Saint-Louis in Paris, while the first textbooks and atlases appeared in print during the same period of time, such as Description Des Maladies de la Peau Observées À L'hôpital Saint-Louis (Description of Skin Diseases Observed at Saint-Louis Hospital) in 1806 by Jean-Louis Alibert. He was the first to mention mycosis fungoides, keloids, and cutaneous leishmaniasis in medical literature.

Researchers at this time often combined studies of skin diseases with systemic diseases which presented symptoms on the skin, most notably syphilis. 1843 saw the publication of the journal Annales des maladies de la peau et de la syphilis (Annals of diseases of the skin and syphilis), the first scientific journal dedicated to skin diseases.

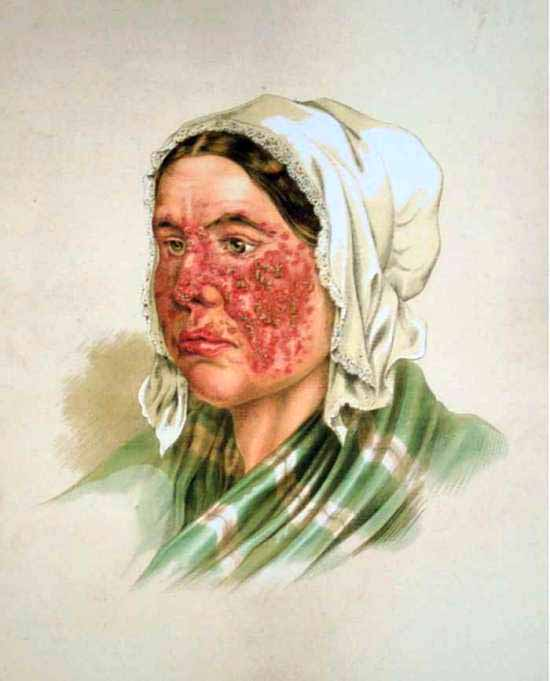
Lupus erythematosus as depicted in Hebra's Atlas der Hautkrankheiten

By the mid-19th century, dermatology had become a widely recognised field. Publications such as Gustav Simon's Die Hautkrankheiten durch anatomische Untersuchungen erläutert (Skin Diseases Illustrated by Anatomical Investigations) and Ferdinand von Hebra's Atlas der Hautkrankheiten (Atlas of Skin Diseases) sought to illustrate a wide range of dermatological conditions and allow physicians to recognise symptoms in their patients.

Hospitals such as Berlin's Charité had established dedicated dermatological departments, which led to significant advances in the description of conditions and their potential treatments. Physicians at the Charité, such as Gustav Simon and Felix von Bärensprung, led a department at the hospital that focused on the research into and treatment of skin diseases and syphilis. Both men died after contracting syphilis during the course of their medical work.

In 1889, the first International Congress of Dermatology and Syphilology was hosted at the Dermatology Museum of Saint-Louis Hospital in Paris.

== 20th century ==
In the 20th century, the diagnosis of dermatological conditions took leaps forward, in part due to the application of new diagnostic tools. Photography allowed for the accurate documentation of skin observations, with these images easily disseminated in textbooks, while advances in medical optics allowed for clearer and more detailed observation of the skin's surface.

=== Phototherapy ===
The first dematological use of phototherapy, using UV radiation as a treatment method, was pioneered by the Danish physician Niels Ryberg Finsen. He first used filtered sunlight to treat lupus vulgaris in 1893, going on to win the Nobel Prize for Medicine in 1903 after developing a method to treat the condition using a carbon arc lamp.

Medical scientists continued with experiments analysing the effectiveness of various forms of light, such as UVA and UVB radiation, and combining UV treatments with compounds such as psoralen (so-called PUVA therapy). PUVA became the standard treatment for many skin diseases from around the 1970s, though the increased risk of skin cancer after excessive exposure and the increase in commercially available lamps in the 311–313 nm spectrum saw PUVA decline in favour of narrowband UVB treatments. However, PUVA is still used in certain cases that are unresponsive to UVB therapy.

Skin treatments using lasers were first documented by Leon Goldman in 1963, going on to adapt his method using neodymium lasers to treat vascular malformations and cavernous hemangiomas.

== See also ==
- Vienna School of Dermatology
- List of dermatologists
- List of cutaneous conditions
