= List of dermatologists =

This is a list of dermatologists who have made notable contributions to the field of dermatology.

Name	Lifespan	Nationality	Notable contribution(s)
Jean-Louis-Marc Alibert	1768–1837	French	Authored one of the first dermatologic atlases, entitled "Descriptions des maladies de la peau"
Diltor Opromolla	1934–2004	Brazilian	Was a physician and dermatologist respected due to his lifetime work with leprosy patients and leprosy research. Opromolla performed all his work at Lauro de Souza Lima Institute in Bauru, São Paulo, a WHO reference hospital for dermatology. He taught dermatology and leprosy to doctors, nurses, and other health workers. Among other things, he was the first to introduce rifamycin in the treatment of leprosy, in 1963.
Jean Astruc	1684–1766	American	Wrote the first great treatise on syphilis and venereal diseases, and considered, by some, to be the "founder of modern dermatology"
Anne-Charles Lorry	1726–1783	French	Student of Astruc wrote a treatise on skin diseases
Robert J. Bentley	1943–	American	Governor of Alabama. He entered private medical practice and opened a series of dermatology clinics throughout the southern United States.
Ferdinand Ritter von Hebra	1816–1880	Austrian	Co-author of the influential Atlas der Hautkrankheiten, a detailed illustrated guide to skin diseases.
Henry Piffard	1842–1910	American	Wrote An Elementary Treatise on Diseases of the Skin (1871), A Treatise on the Materia Medica and Therapeutics of the Skin (1881), A Practical Treatise on Diseases of the Skin (1891), and translated Alfred Hardy's The Dartrous Diathesis, or Eczema and its Allied Affections.
Henry Radcliffe Crocker	1846–1909	English	Wrote Diseases of the Skin: their Description, Pathology, Diagnosis and Treatment, which established him as a leading figure in the field
Mitchel P. Goldman	1955–	American	Author of twenty-one medical textbooks on the subject
Jeffrey A. Klein		American	Described the "tumescent liposuction technique", which added high volumes of fluid containing a local anesthetic, allowing the procedure to be done in an office setting under intravenous sedation rather than general anesthesia
Lucky Meisenheimer	1957–	American	Also has Guinness world record collection of yo-yos; athlete, author, and actor
Norman Orentreich	1922–2019	American	Performed the first successful modern hair transplant in 1952 in his New York office. Created Clinique, the first widely popular cosmetics brand developed by a dermatologist.
Stefania Jabłońska	1920—2017	Polish	Pioneering work on human papillomaviruses and their link to cancer. Recipient of the National Order of Merit and the Commander's Cross of the Order of Polonia Restituta.
Dina Strachan	fl. 2000s	American	Academic dermatologist and writer, promoting diversity and inclusion.

== Dermatologists in popular culture ==
- Dr. Sandra Lee, presenter of the TLC TV series Dr. Pimple Popper

== Fictional dermatologists ==
- Dr. Archibald Newlands (Martin Donovan) in the television series Law & Order: Special Victims Unit
- Dr. Sara Sitarides (Marcia Cross) in the television sitcom Seinfeld
- Dr. Emily Sweeney (Laura Spencer) in the television series The Big Bang Theory
