= Moritz Kaposi =

Hungarian physician and dermatologist

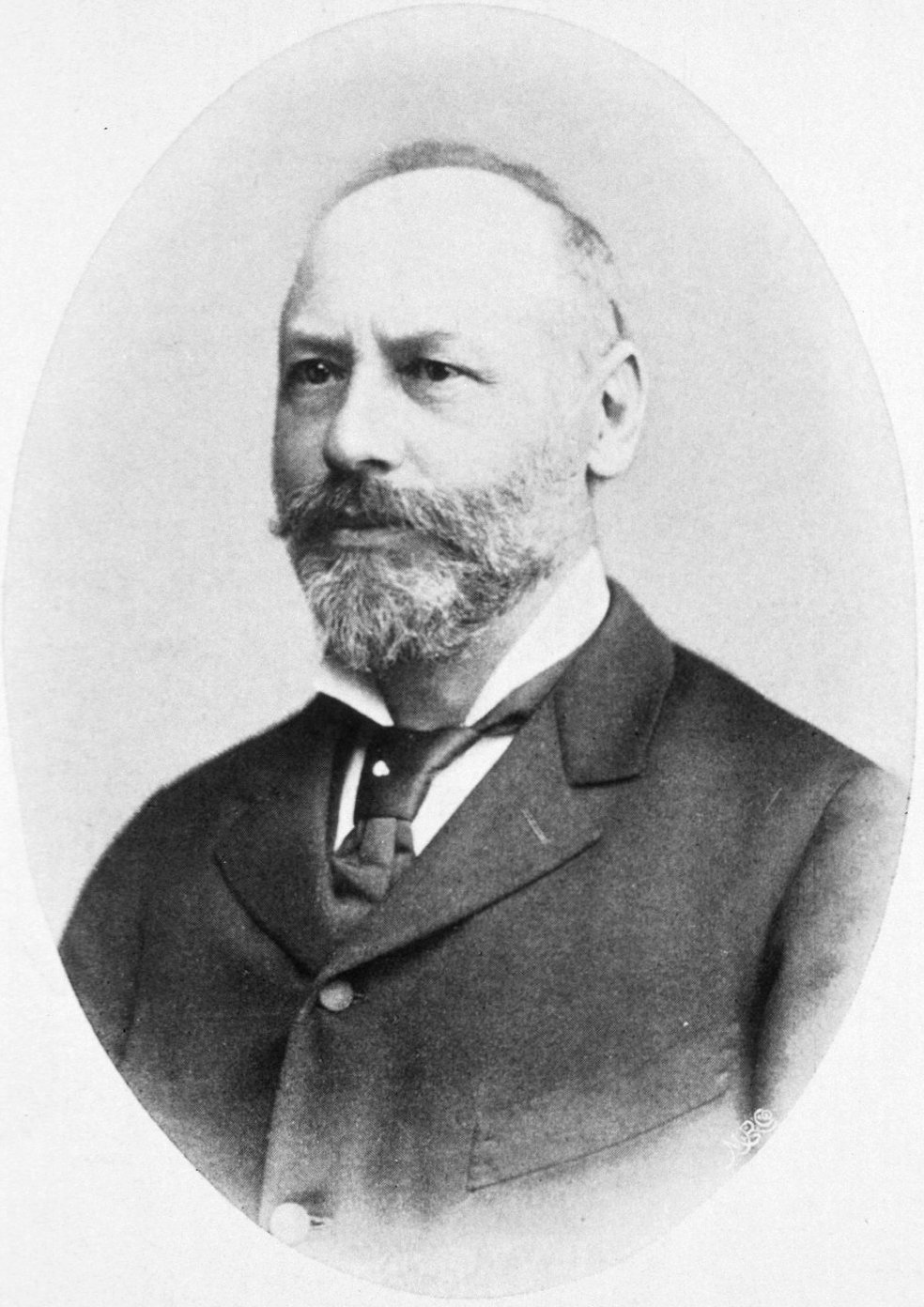
Moritz Kaposi

Moritz Kaposi (/kəˈpoʊsi/; Hungarian: Kaposi Mór [ˈkɒpoʃi ˈmoːr]; 23 October 1837 – 6 March 1902) was a physician and dermatologist from the Austro-Hungarian Empire who discovered the skin tumor that received his name (Kaposi's sarcoma).

== Biography ==
=== Early life and name ===
Born in Kaposvár, Hungary, Austrian Empire, to a Jewish family, originally his surname was Kohn; but, with his conversion to the Catholic faith, he changed it to Kaposi in 1871, in reference to his town of birth. One purported reason behind this is that he wanted to marry a daughter of then-dermatology chair, Ferdinand Ritter von Hebra, and advance in society, which he could not have done being of Jewish faith. This motivation seems unlikely, however, because he married Martha Hebra and converted to Catholicism several years prior to changing his name, by which time he was already well established in the Vienna University faculty and a close associate of her father, Ferdinand. A more plausible explanation is based on his own comments to colleagues that he changed his name to avoid confusion with five other similarly named physicians on the Vienna faculty. Rumors about the sincerity of both his marriage and his concerns about his Jewish ancestry may have arisen through professional jealousy; William Dubreuilh (1857–1935), first professor and chairman of dermatology in Bordeaux, noted, "On disait de Kaposi qu'il avait pris la fille de Hebra, sa maison, sa chaire et sa clientèle, laissant le reste à son beau-frère Hans Hebra." ("It was said of Kaposi that he had taken Hebra's daughter, his home, his chair and his clientele, leaving the rest to his brother-in-law, Hans Hebra.")

=== Education and career ===
In 1855, Kaposi began to study medicine at the University of Vienna and attained a doctorate in 1861. In his dissertation, titled Dermatologie und Syphilis (1866) he made an important contribution to the field. Kaposi was appointed as professor at the University of Vienna in 1875, and in 1881 he became a member of the board of the Vienna General Hospital and director of its clinic of skin diseases.

Together with his mentor, Ferdinand Ritter von Hebra, he authored the book Lehrbuch der Hautkrankheiten (Textbook of Skin Diseases) in 1878. Kaposi's main work, however, was Pathologie und Therapie der Hautkrankheiten in Vorlesungen für praktische Ärzte und Studierende (Pathology and Therapy of the Skin Diseases in Lectures for Practical Physicians and Students), published in 1880, which became one of the most significant books in the history of dermatology, being translated to several languages. He is credited with the description of xeroderma pigmentosum, a rare genetic disorder now known to be caused by defects in nucleotide excision repair ("Ueber Xeroderma pigmentosum. Medizinische Jahrbücher, Wien, 1882: 619–633"). Among other diseases, Kaposi was the first to study lichen scrofulosorum and lupus erythematosus. In all, he published over 150 books and papers. He is widely credited with advancing the use of pathologic examination in the diagnosis of dermatologic diseases.

He died on 6 March 1902 in Vienna, Austria-Hungary.

=== Kaposi's sarcoma ===
His name entered into the history of medicine in 1872, when he described for the first time Kaposi's sarcoma, a cancer of the skin, which he had discovered in five elderly male patients and which he initially named "idiopathic multiple pigmented sarcoma". More than a century later, the appearance of this disease in young gay men in New York City, San Francisco and other coastal cities in the United States was one of the first indications that a new disease, now called AIDS, had appeared. Kaposi's sarcoma is a tumor that is caused by a virus, Kaposi's sarcoma-associated herpesvirus or KSHV, discovered in 1993. Kaposi's sarcoma is now the most commonly reported cancer in parts of sub-Saharan Africa.

According to J. D. Oriel, "in his lifetime, Moritz Kaposi was acknowledged as one of the great masters of the Vienna School of Dermatology, a superb clinician and renowned teacher". While his mentor, Ferdinand von Hebra, is considered the "father of German dermatology", Kaposi was one of the first to establish dermatology on its anatomical pathology scientific basis. He became the chairman of the Vienna School of Dermatology, after Hebra's death in 1880.

== Works ==
- Lehrbuch der Hautkrankheiten (1878 with Ferdinand von Hebra)
- Pathologie und Therapie der Hautkrankheiten in Vorlesungen für praktische Ärzte und Studierende (1880)
- Pathologie und Therapie der Syphilis (1881)
- Handatlas der Hautkrankenheiten (1879)
- "Idiopathisches multiples Pigmentsarkom der Haut" (1872). Arch Dermatol Syph 4:265–73 (original article describing Kaposi's sarcoma).
- Braun M (1982). "Classics in Oncology. Idiopathic multiple pigmented sarcoma of the skin by Kaposi". CA Cancer J Clin. 32: 340–7. doi:10.3322/canjclin.32.6.340. PMID 6812893.
