= Mitchel P. Goldman =

American dermatologic surgeon (born 1955)

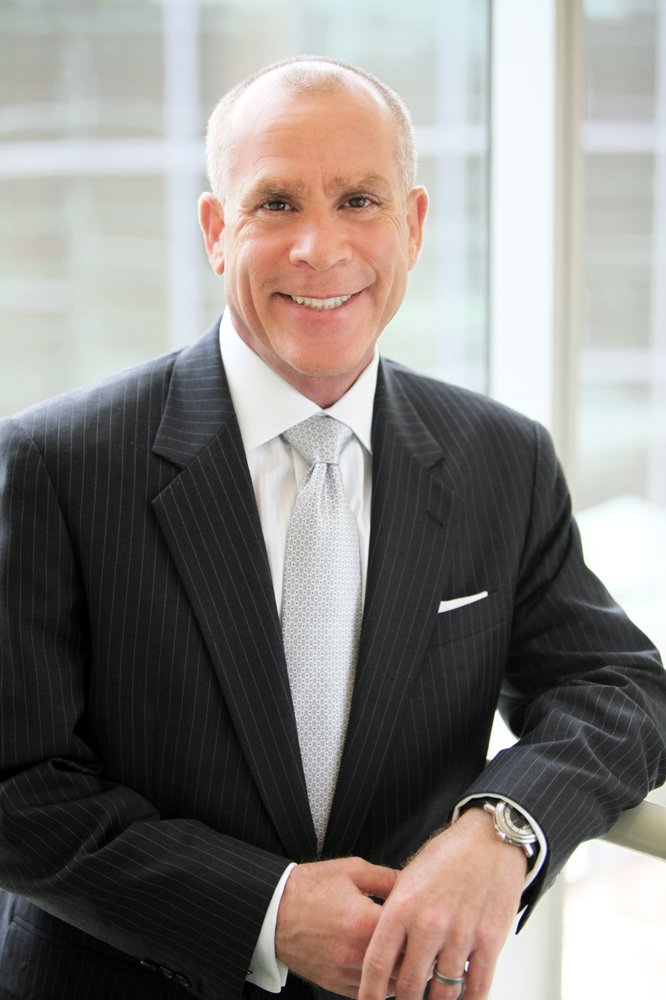
- Born: April 5, 1955 (age 71)
- Education: Stanford University (M.D.)
- Occupation: Dermatologist
- Website: www.clderm.com

Mitchel P. Goldman (born April 5, 1955) is an American dermatologist and phlebologist, and the founder and director of Cosmetic Laser Dermatology. He is a past president of the American Society for Dermatologic Surgery, the American College of Phlebology (now the American Vein and Lymphatic Society), the San Diego County Dermatology Society, and the Sonoran Dermatology Society.

== Early life and education ==
Goldman was born and raised in Miami Beach, Florida. He earned his bachelor's degree at Boston University, and his medical degree at Stanford University School of Medicine, graduating summa cum laude and Phi Beta Kappa. He completed an internal medicine internship at the University of California, San Diego, and a dermatology residency at the University of California, Los Angeles.

== Career ==
Goldman began practicing medicine in 1982 and completed his dermatology residency in 1986. In addition to his work at Cosmetic Laser Dermatology, he serves as medical director for West Dermatology and Platinum Dermatology Partners, and is a co-founder of SkinMedica. He is chairman of the Calecim Professional Medical Advisory Board.

Goldman is board certified by the American Board of Dermatology and a Diplomate of the American Board of Cosmetic Surgery.

In 2022 and 2023, Newsweek named Goldman as #1 in their annual list of America's Best Cosmetic Dermatologists.

He has served as a volunteer clinical professor in dermatology at the University of California, San Diego, and as Honorary Professor of Dermatology for the Chinese Academy of Medical Sciences.

=== Positions ===
Goldman is a past president of the American Society for Dermatologic Surgery, the founder and past president of the American College of Phlebology, and a founding member of the Space Dermatology Foundation. He is the director of the American Society for Dermatologic Surgery Fellowship Program (which he initiated in 2013), and has hospital affiliations with Scripps Memorial Hospital in La Jolla, California.

He is a fellow of the following organizations:

- American Academy of Dermatology
- American Society for Dermatologic Surgery
- American Board of Cosmetic Surgery
- American Society for Laser Medicine and Surgery
- American Academy of Cosmetic Surgery
- American College of Phlebology
- American Society of Liposuction Surgery

Goldman serves as a member of over 30 professional societies and is a medical consultant to numerous companies, including Allergan, Galderma, Merz, SkinCeuticals, CellResearch Corporation, and Lumenis Laser Corporation, as well as Pomega, Dyve, 10x Bio, and Sofwave.

=== Specializations and research ===
In addition to his board certification in dermatology, Goldman also specializes in the field of phlebology and sclerotherapy vein treatments. He has written and lectured extensively on vascular topics, publishing multiple medical textbooks on the subject in five languages, some now in their 6th edition. Goldman is often referred to as the "godfather of sclerotherapy."

Goldman has been involved in FDA approvals of dermal fillers such as Restylane®, Juvéderm®, and RHA®, as well as neuromodulators including Botox®, Jeuveau®, Dysport®, and Daxxify®. He lectures nationally and internationally on innovative cosmetic treatments and techniques.

He has invented or helped develop a number of laser, light, and energy devices used in cosmetic procedures, including:

- Intense Pulsed Light (IPL)
- Q-switched alexandrite laser
- Ultrapulse CO_{2} laser
- Long-pulsed Nd:YAG laser for superficial veins
- Endoluminal radiofrequency and laser closure for varicose veins

=== Awards ===
- Richard E. Fitzpatrick, MD Award, Masters of Aesthetics, 2026
- #1 America's Best Cosmetic Dermatologists (2022, 2023), Newsweek
- Castle Connolly Top Doctor (since 2004)
- Presidential Citation, American Society for Laser Medicine & Surgery, 2016, (Invaluable Contribution as an International Ambassador and Worldwide Leader in Laser and Energy Device Education)
- “21st Century Achievement Award,” American Academy of Cosmetic Surgery, 2026 (Outstanding Contribution to Cosmetic Surgery in the 21st Century)
- Presidents Award, American Society for Dermatologic Surgery, 2009 (Outstanding Contribution in Teaching and Research)
- “20th Century Award,” American Academy of Cosmetic Surgery, 1998 (Outstanding Contribution to Cosmetic Surgery in the 20th Century)
- Presidential Citation, American Society for Laser Medicine & Surgery, 2024, (Pioneering Work Developing Minimally Invasive Treatments for Leg Veins)
- Healthgrades Honor Roll

== Publications ==
Goldman is considered a leading medical authority around the world and has authored 14 medical textbooks, some in 2nd, 3rd, 4th, 5th, and 6th editions, on cosmetic and laser surgery, dermatology, sclerotherapy, ambulatory phlebectomy, and cellulite. Several are considered definitive texts in their respective fields. He has published over 400 peer-reviewed medical articles and was named the #1 most published doctor in Dermatologic Surgery, the journal of the American Society for Dermatologic Surgery.

He is an associate editor of several medical journals including: Dermatologic Surgery, and the Journal of Cosmetic Dermatology. In 2025, Goldman served as Guest Editor for a Special Issue of Dermatologic Surgery on Fibroblastic Stimulation, which examined natural, physiologic approaches to skin rejuvenation through laser, light, and energy-based technologies, injectables, and topical skincare.

=== Textbooks ===
- Sclerotherapy Treatment of Varicose and Telangiectatic Leg Veins: Sixth Edition, Elsevier (2017). ISBN 978-0323377263
- Cellulite: Pathophysiology and Treatment, 2nd Edition New York (2010). ISBN 978-1439802717
- Photodynamic Therapy, Second Edition, Saunders, Elsevier (2008). ISBN 978-1416054887
- Cutaneous and Cosmetic Laser Surgery, Mosby/Elsevier (2006). ISBN 978-0323033121
- Ambulatory Phlebectomy: A Practical Guide for Treating Varicose Veins 1st Edition, Mosby (1995). ISBN 978-0815170457

(Additional editions in 2nd, 3rd, 4th, and 5th printing)

=== Research studies ===
- For Dr. Goldman's selected research, see the PubMed Database.
