= Murata Kentarō =

Murata Kentarō (村田 謙太郎, December 19, 1863 – June 27, 1892) was a Japanese dermatologist born in Iwaki, Fukushima. At 12, he went to Tokyo and studied philosophy until 1877. He entered the Tokyo University of Foreign Studies in 1874, where he studied German. He completed his medical training at Tokyo University in 1884 and in 1888 he went to Berlin on an exchange. Although he left due to illness, in Germany he studied under many prominent dermatologists, including: Georg Richard Lewin, Gustav Behrend, and Oskar Lassar at the University of Berlin; Mortiz Kaposi and Isidor Neumann at the University of Vienna in Austria. He also studied hygiene and pathology under Robert Koch, who became head of the University of Berlin in 1885.

When he returned to Japan, Murata was appointed the first professor of Dermatology and Syphilology at Tokyo University. Almost coincident was the Japanese government's appointment of Julius Scriba to the Tokyo University department of surgery and dermatology. Dohi Keizō (土肥 慶蔵, see: Keizo Dohi), who founded the Japanese Dermatological Society in 1900 and the Japanese Journal of Dermatology and Urology in 1901, was an assistant of Scriba.

Murata was the first Japanese person with a medical degree to die.

== Selected writings ==
- 皮膚病梅毒論 (A Treatise on Dermatology and Syphilology) (1889)

A translation of the work of Edmund Lesser into Japanese, completed with Ise Jōgorō 伊勢錠五郎
