= Ernst Schweninger =

German physician and naturopath (1850–1924)

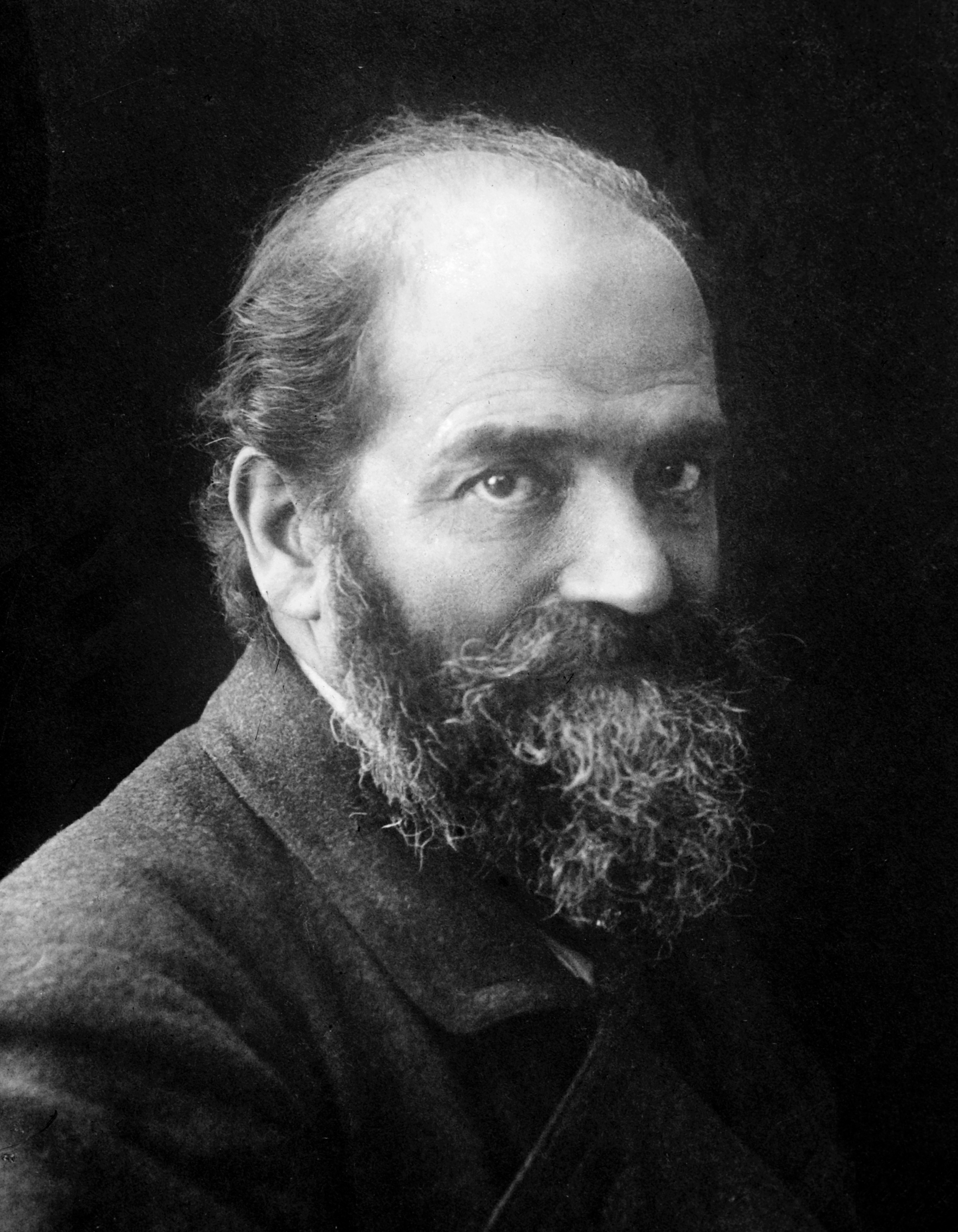
Ernst Schweninger

Ernst Schweninger (15 June 1850 – 13 January 1924) was a German physician and naturopath who developed the Schweninger method, a reduction of obesity by the restriction of fluids in the diet.

== Biography ==
He was born on 15 June 1850 in Freystadt, Upper Palatinate. He studied medicine at the Ludwig-Maximilians-Universität München where he received his M.D. in 1870. His appointment to a chair at Berlin in 1884 against the wishes of the medical faculty was largely due to his successful treatment of Otto von Bismarck for obesity. His method was a modification of the method developed by William Banting. He published Dem Andenken Bismarcks in 1899. He retired to private life in Munich in 1905. He died there on 13 January 1924.

Schweninger rejected orthodox medicine and embraced naturopathy. He established the first nature cure hospital in Berlin. He was considered to have a doubtful reputation and was distrusted by those in the medical community.

== See also ==
- Georg Richard Lewin
