= Gustav Simon (physician) =

German dermatologist

- Born: 2 November 1810; Berlin, Kingdom of Prussia
- Died: 11 May 1857 (aged 46); Zehlendorf, Berlin, Kingdom of Prussia
- Education: Friedrich-Wilhelms-Universität
- Known for: Founder of dermatopathology, description of Demodex folliculorum
- Scientific career
- Fields: Dermatology, scientific medicine
- Workplaces: Charité
- Thesis: On the Styptic Power of Binelli's Water and Creosote (De aquae Binelli et kreosoti virtute styptica) (1833)

Karl Gustav Theodor Simon (2 November 1810 in Berlin – 11 May 1857 in Zehlendorf, Berlin) was a German medical doctor, pathologist, and dermatologist and the founder of dermatopathology.

== Life ==
Gustav Simon began his medical studies in 1829 in Berlin. In 1831, he moved to Bonn to attend lectures by the anatomist, physiologist, and biologist Johannes Peter Müller. The following year, he returned to Berlin and earned his doctorate in medicine in 1833 with a dissertation in which he questioned the claimed styptic properties of Aqua Binelli (Binelli's water), a purportedly haemostatic compound invented in 1797 by the Italian Fedele Binelli, and creosote.

Gustav Simon remained a practicing physician in Berlin but continued to work on scientific publications. His microscopic studies and histopathological works were included in Ferdinand von Hebra's Atlas der Hautkrankheiten (Atlas of Skin Diseases).

In 1842 he took a position as a physician for the needy. It was during this time that he discovered and described the hair follicle mite. In 1844, Simon qualified as a lecturer for general pathology and therapy, but later also gave lectures in dermatology, which were well attended. His 1848 first edition of 'Skin Diseases Illustrated by Anatomical Investigations' (Die Hautkrankheiten durch anatomische Untersuchungen erläutert) was the first textbook of dermatopathology, and comprised microscopic comparative studies of healthy and diseased skin.

In 1848 Simon was appointed director of the Department of Skin Diseases and Syphilis at the Charité hospital in Berlin. He became one of the leading European specialists for skin and venereal diseases. In 1850, study trips took him to England and France.

In 1853 Simon showed signs of neurosyphilis from an earlier infection. His work in microscopy was affected by problems with his vision. His normally composed personality gave way to irritability, aggression and confusion, leading to his removal from the departmental directorship at the Charité, being replaced by Felix von Bärensprung. Eventually, Simon began to show signs of paralysis. The nature of the disease was not yet understood and his subsequent stays in sanatoriums in Potsdam, Eberswalde, and Leubus brought no improvement to his condition.

Gustav Simon died in 1857 in the Schweizerhof Nerve Clinic founded by Heinrich Laehr in Berlin's Zehlendorf district.

== Works ==
- On the Styptic Power of Binelli's Water and Creosote (De aquae Binelli et kreosoti virtute styptica). Dissertation for the attainment of a doctorate, Berlin, 1833
- On a Mite Living in the Diseased and Normal Hair Follicles of Humans (Über eine in den kranken und normalen Haarsäcken des Menschen lebende Milbe). Berlin, 1842
- Skin Diseases Illustrated by Anatomical Investigations (Die Hautkrankheiten durch anatomische Untersuchungen erläutert). Berlin, 1848
- Report on the Syphilis Department in the Year 1849 (Bericht über die Abteilung für Syphilis im Jahre 1849). Charité Annals, Berlin, 1849
- On the Treatment of Gonorrhoea in Men with Caustic Injections (Über die Behandlung des Männertrippers mit kaustischen Einspritzungen). Charité Annals, Berlin, 1853
