= Anton Elfinger =

Austrian physician and illustrator

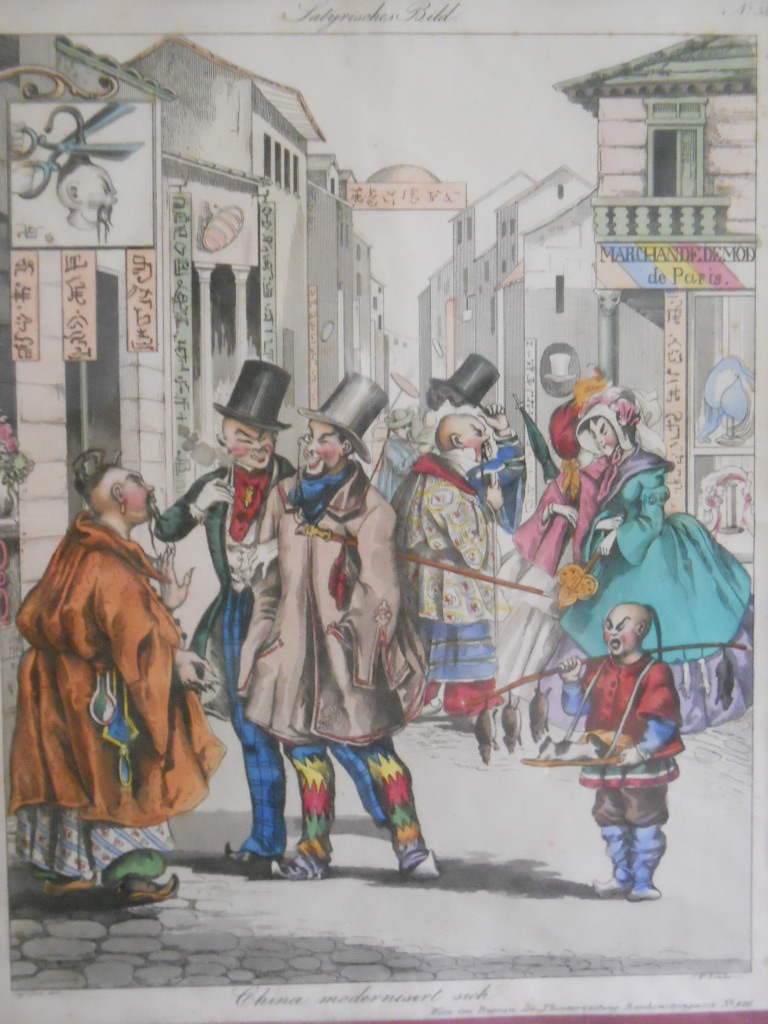
Cajetan: satirical cartoon- "China modernisirt sich" (China modernizes)

Anton Elfinger (15 January 1821 – 19 January 1864) was an Austrian medical doctor and illustrator.

Son of a pharmacist in Vienna, he trained at the Academy of Fine Arts Vienna, where he was a student of Leopold Kupelwieser (1796-1862). He later studied medicine, earning his medical doctorate in 1845.

Afterwards he was an assistant to dermatologist Ferdinand von Hebra (1816–1880) in Vienna. From 1849 until 1858, he was an illustrator of medical technical literature. He was acclaimed for his skillful artistry, in particular the artwork in Hebra's Atlas der Hautkrankheiten (Atlas of Skin Diseases), of which he shared the artistic duties with Carl Heitzmann (1836–1896).

Elfinger was also a highly regarded cartoonist, and published his work under the pseudonym "Cajetan". His illustrations consisted of a wide array of subjects, including political cartoons.
