= Dermatologic Surgery (journal) =

- Discipline: Dermatology
- Language: English

Publication details
- History: 1975–present
- Publisher: American Society for Dermatologic Surgery, Lippincott, Williams & Wilkins (United States)
- Frequency: Monthly
- Open access: Hybrid
- Impact factor: 2.2 (2024)

Standard abbreviations
- ISO 4: Dermatol. Surg.

Indexing
- ISSN: 1076-0512 (print); 1524-4725 (web)
- OCLC no.: 38871404

Links
- Journal homepage

Dermatologic Surgery is a monthly peer-reviewed journal that deals with the subject matter of dermatology. The journal is published by American Society for Dermatologic Surgery, Lippincott, Williams & Wilkins According to the Journal Citation Reports, the journal has a 2024 impact factor of 2.2.
