= Carl Heitzmann =

- Born: 2 October 1836; Vinkovci, Austrian Empire (now Croatia)
- Died: 6 December 1896 (aged 60)

Carl Heitzmann (2 October 1836 – 6 December 1896) was a pathologist and dermatologist in the Austro-Hungarian Empire.

== Biography ==
Heitzmann was born on 2 October 1836 in Vinkovci, Austrian Empire to a Jewish family. His father, Martin Heitzmann, was a surgeon in the Austrian army. Heitzmann studied medicine in Budapest and Vienna, earning his doctorate in 1859. After graduation, he furthered his studies in Vienna with Franz Schuh (1804–1864), Ferdinand Hebra (1816–1880), Salomon Stricker (1834–1898), and Carl Rokitansky (1804–1878). In Vienna, he performed lectures on morbid anatomy at the university.

When he was unable to succeed Rokitansky as the chair of pathology at Vienna, he emigrated to New York (1874). Here, he established a laboratory for microscopical research, and became one of the founders of the American Dermatological Association (ADA).

Heitzmann is credited for being the first physician to describe the precursor corpuscles of red cells, structures that he referred to as hematoblasts. In 1872 he documented his findings in a treatise titled Studien am Knochen und Knorpel, in which he mentions that his discovery of the hematoblast was in the bone marrow of an injured dog's leg.

== Works ==
Heitzmann was a skilled illustrator and lithographer, being renowned for his work with water colors. Among his artistic works are water color illustrations he created with Anton Elfinger (1821–1864) in Hebra's 1876 Atlas der Hautkrankheiten (Atlas of Skin Diseases). Written works:

- Compendium der chirurgischen Pathologie und Therapie, (Compendium of surgical pathology and therapy; 2 vols., 1864 & 1868)
- Descriptive and Topographical Anatomy of Man in 600 Illustrations, (2 volumes, third edition- 1886)
- Kenntniss der Dünndarmzotten” and “Untersuchungen über das Protoplasma in "Transactions of the Imperial Academy of Sciences", (Vienna, 1867–73)
- Microscopic Morphology of the Animal Body, (1873)
- Microscopic Studies of Inflammations of the Skin, in "Archives of Dermatology" (Philadelphia, 1879)

== Bibliography ==
- Kraus, Ognjen (1998). Dva stoljeća povijesti i kulture Židova u Zagrebu i Hrvatskoj. Zagreb: Židovska općina Zagreb. ISBN 978-953-96836-2-5.

Attribution
