= Anne-Charles Lorry =

French physician

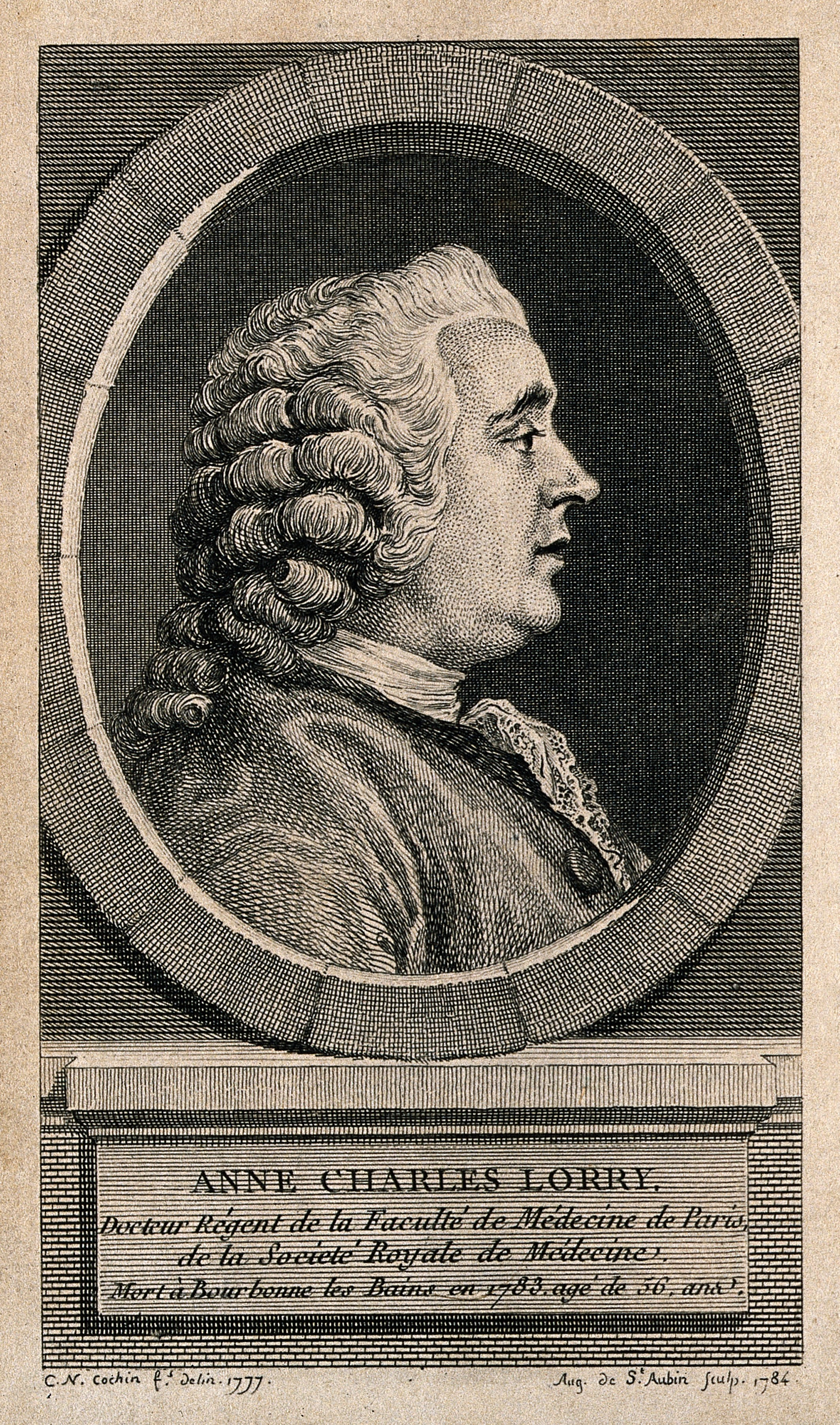
- Born: 10 October 1726; Paris, France
- Died: 18 September 1783 (aged 56); Bourbonne-les-Bains, France
- Occupation: Physician
- Medical career
- Research: Psychiatry, Dermatology

Anne-Charles Lorry (10 October 1726 – 18 September 1783) was a French physician who pioneered in psychiatry and dermatology. He has been called the founder of French dermatology and in his 1777 treatise, he described 115 skin diseases, grouping them into 14 classes.

Lorry was born in Paris to Francois, a professor of law at the University of Paris, and Madeleine LaFosse who came from a family of artists known for the studio of LeBrun. Lorry apprenticed in medicine under Jean Astruc, physician to Louis XV. He received a doctorate in 1748. When he treated the infant of the Duc de Richlieu successfully, he became known in aristocratic circles. After Louis XV died of smallpox, he became physician to Louis XVI. In 1775 he was one of the founding members of the Royal Society of Medicine. Lorry's 1777 work Tractatus de Morbis Cutaneis was one of the first work on dermatology in France, although written in Latin. He developed gout from 1776 and then had paralytic attacks and arteriosclerosis from 1782. He retired from Royal service in 1783 and travelled to seek better health but died at Bourbonne-les-Bains.
