= Sofwave Medical =

Israeli company

Sofwave Medical Ltd
- Company type: Public
- Traded as: TASE
- Industry: Medical device
- Founded: 2015; 11 years ago
- Founders: Shimon Eckhouse; Ariel Sverdlik
- Headquarters: California, United States
- Area served: Worldwide
- Key people: Shimon Eckhouse (Chairman); Lou Scafuri (CEO); Ariel Sverdlik (CTO)
- Products: Sofwave
- Website: sofwave.com

Sofwave Medical is an Israeli aesthetic medicine company with headquarters in California, United States. It is publicly traded, listed on the Tel Aviv Stock Exchange (TASE: SOFW). Sofwave develops an ultrasound system for non-invasive dermatological aesthetic treatment to improve facial lines and wrinkles and for short term improvement in the appearance of cellulite.

== History ==
Sofwave was established in 2015 by Dr. Shimon Eckhouse (founder and chairman) and Ariel Sverdlik (CTO) in the Alon Medtech Ventures incubator, in Yokneam, Israel, which is part of Israel Innovation Authority. Eckhouse has been dubbed by the newspapers as the father of the medical aesthetics field in Israel. He invested in and founded dozens of companies, including Lumenis, that was sold for $1.2 billion, and Syneron Medical, that reached a market capitalization of $1 billion, both listed on Nasdaq.

In September 2019, Sofwave Medical Inc. was founded, a subsidiary fully owned by Sofwave. Listed in Delaware, it is the marketing branch of the group in the US. In 2019, Sofwave raised $8.4 million in funding led by XT Hi-Tech, of Ofer Family and started selling its product in late 2019. In May 2021, the company raised $50 million at a pre-money valuation of $192 million in the IPO in the TASE.

The company reported revenues of $21.8 million in 2021, an increase of 408% compared to 2020. The gross income increased from $2.6 million in 2020 to $16.2 million in 2021. In North America, revenues reached $13.5 million, compared to $3.4 million in 2020. The operating loss in 2021 was $8.9 million, compared to $6.6 million in 2020.

== Product ==
The product that Sofwave develops and sells is based on the Synchronous Ultrasound Parallel Beam technology, which was invented by Shimon Eckhouse and Ariel Sverdlik (CTO). The device facilitates a non-invasive treatment through seven cooled transducers, creating thermal zones in the dermis without injuring the epidermis, focusing its energy circa 1.5 mm below the skin’s surface. The treatment takes 30–45 minutes with minimal downtime treatment and reaches a result within a single treatment. It aims to firm patients' skin in the face and neck, and treat wrinkles. The device also used for improvement in the appearance of cellulite. The appliance has been cleared by the FDA, CE, AMAR, MOHW, and TGA, among others.

Sofwave won Elle award 2021, Newbeauty award 2022, Shape skin award 2022 and Cosmopolitan award 2022.

Sofwave's direct competitor is the US company Ulthera.
