= Jean Astruc =

French physician and professor (1684–1766)

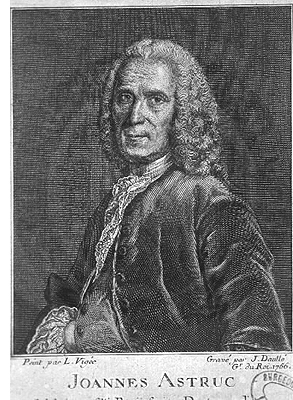
- Retrato do médico francês Jean Astruc. Instituto de História da Ciência, Filadélfia
- Born: 19 March 1684
- Died: 5 May 1766; Paris
- Occupations: Professor, theologian, medical doctor
- Employer: Collège de France (1731–1766)

Jean Astruc (19 March 1684, in Sauve, Languedoc, France – 5 May 1766, in Paris) was a professor of medicine in France at Montpellier and Paris, who wrote the first great treatise on syphilis and venereal diseases, and also, with a small anonymously published book, played a fundamental part in the origins of critical textual analysis of works of the Bible. Astruc was the first to propose and hypothesize, by using the techniques of textual analysis that were commonplace in studying the secular classics, the theory that Genesis was composed based on several sources or manuscript traditions, an approach now called the documentary hypothesis.

== Life and career ==
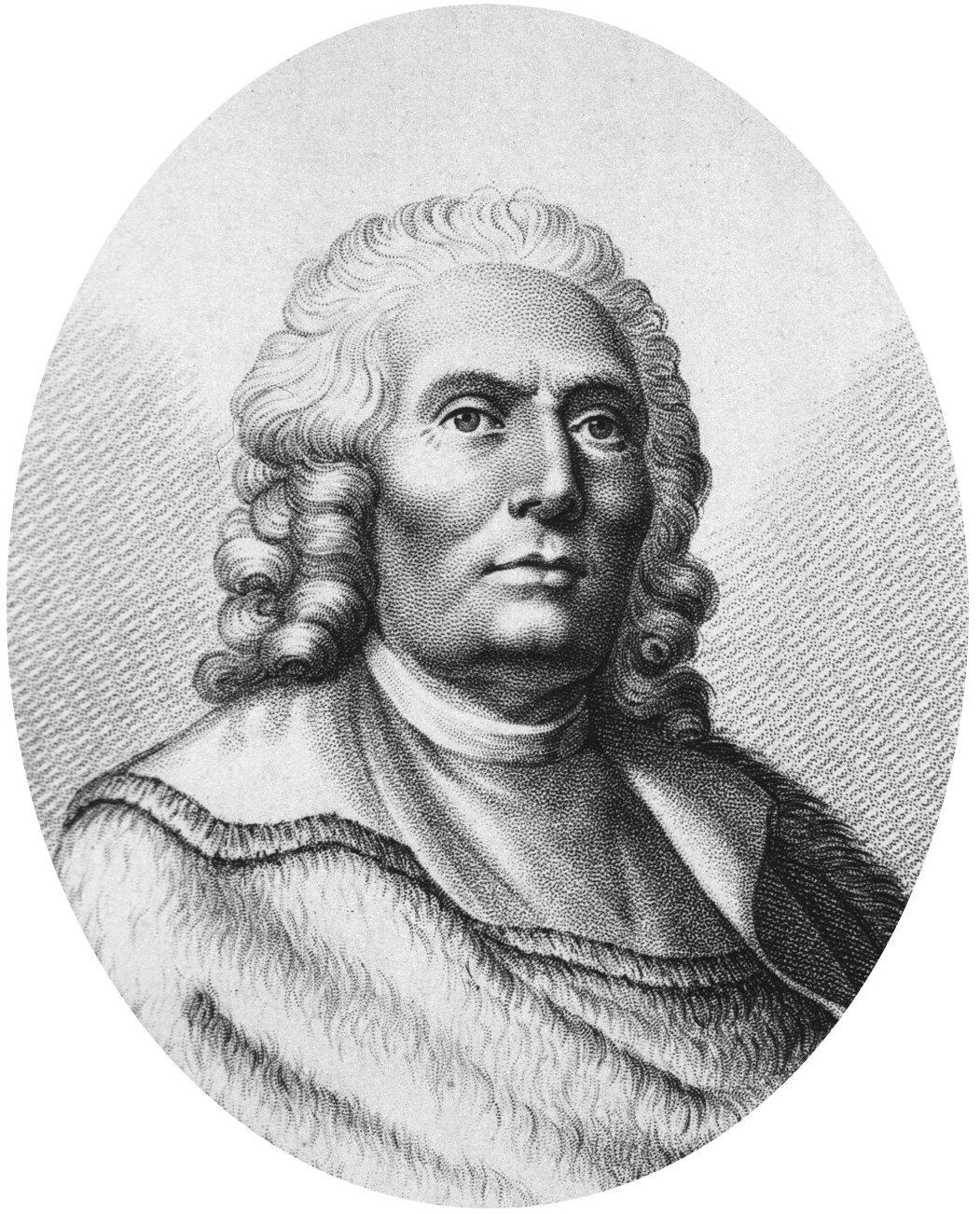
Jean Astruc

The son of a Protestant minister who had converted to Catholicism but returned to Protestantism before his death, Astruc was educated at Montpellier, one of the great schools of medicine in early modern Europe. His dissertation and first publication, submitted when he was only 19, was on decomposition, and contained many references to recent research on the lungs by Thomas Willis and Robert Boyle. After teaching medicine at Montpellier, he became a member of the medical faculty at the University of Paris. His numerous medical writings, or materials for the history of medical education at Montpellier, are now forgotten, but the work published by him anonymously in 1753 has secured for him a permanent reputation. This book, brought out anonymously in 1753, was entitled Conjectures sur les memoires originaux dont il paroit que Moyse s'est servi pour composer le livre de la Genese. Avec des remarques qui appuient ou qui éclaircissent ces conjectures ("Conjectures on the original documents that Moses appears to have used in composing the Book of Genesis. With remarks that support or throw light upon these conjectures"). The title cautiously gives the place of publication as Brussels, safely beyond the reach of French authorities.

The safeguard was required since Astruc's Languedoc homeland was in the frame of the Counter-Reformation, and the Protestant "Camisards" being deported or sent to the galleys was still a very recent memory. In Astruc's own times the writers of the Encyclopédie were working under great pressure and in secret, the Catholic Church not offering a tolerant atmosphere for biblical criticism.

That was somewhat ironic, for Astruc saw himself as fundamentally a supporter of orthodoxy; his unorthodoxy lay not in denying Mosaic authorship of Genesis but in his defence of it. In the previous century scholars such as Thomas Hobbes, Isaac La Peyrère, and Baruch Spinoza had drawn up long lists of inconsistencies and contradictions and anachronisms in the Torah and used them to argue that Moses could not have been the author of the entire five books. Astruc was outraged by this "sickness of the last century" and was determined to use modern 18th century scholarship to refute that of the 17th century.

Using methods already well established in the study of the Classics for sifting and assessing differing manuscripts, he drew up parallel columns and assigned verses to each of them according to what he had noted as the defining features of the text of Genesis: whether a verse used the term "YHWH" (Yahweh) or the term "Elohim" (God) referring to God and whether it had a doublet (another telling of the same incident, as the two accounts of the creation of man and the two accounts of Sarah being taken by a foreign king). Astruc found four documents in Genesis, which he arranged in four columns, declaring that it was how Moses had originally written his book, similarly to a synopsis of the four Gospels of the New Testament, and a later writer had combined them into a single work, creating the repetitions and inconsistencies which Hobbes, Spinoza and others had noted.

While Astruc's idea that Moses had compiled Genesis was not widely accepted, his method of identifying the multiple sources of the Pentateuch was taken up by a succession of German scholars, the intellectual climate in Germany then being more conducive to scholarly freedom. Those hands formed the foundation of modern critical exegesis of the Old and New Testaments.

Astruc was also the author of Elements of Midwifery ... With ... an answer to a casuistical letter, on the conduct of Adam and Eve, at the birth of their first child ... (1766).

== See also ==
- Anatomists
- List of dermatologists
- Preformationism
