= Friedrich Wilhelm Felix von Bärensprung =

German dermatologist

Felix von Bärensprung
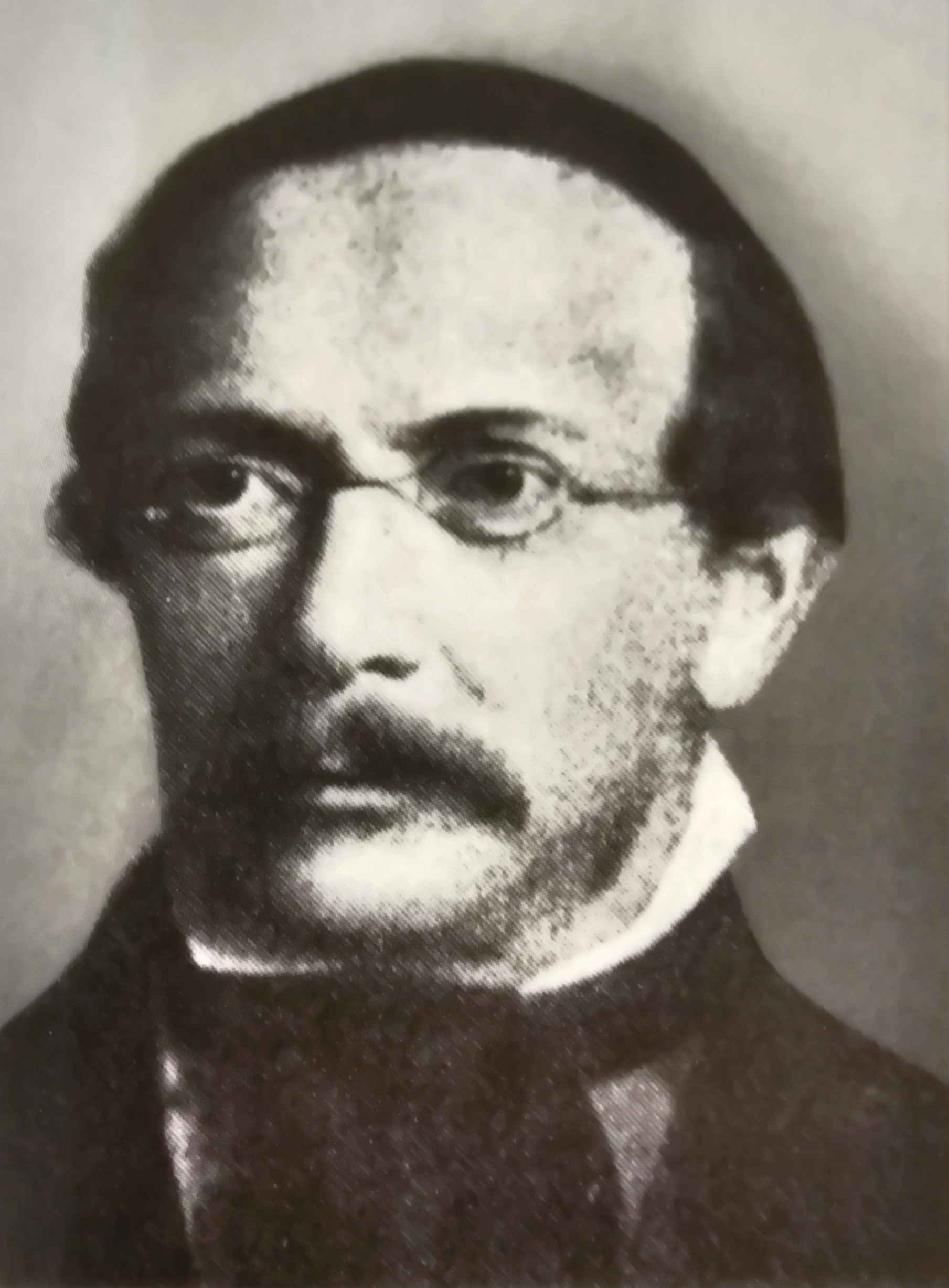
- Born: 30 March 1822; Berlin, Kingdom of Prussia
- Died: 26 August 1864 (aged 42); Kiel, Duchy of Holstein
- Education: Friedrichs-Universität Halle
- Occupation: Dermatologist
- Known for: Research into Tinea cruris, Herpes zoster, Syphilis
- Scientific career
- Workplaces: Charité, University of Berlin

Friedrich Wilhelm Felix von Bärensprung, sometimes Baerensprung, often shortened to Felix von Bärensprung (30 March 1822 – 26 August 1864) was a German dermatologist and entomologist, known for his research into tinea cruris, herpes zoster and syphilis.

== Life ==
Bärensprung was born in Berlin in March 1822, the second son of deputy mayor, and later mayor of Berlin, Friedrich von Bärensprung and Friederike Magdalene Hagemann. He attended the Köllnische Realgymnasium school, where he showed an early interest in zoology and botany.

After completing his Abitur examinations in 1840, he studied medicine and science at the Friedrich Wilhelm University in Berlin and the Friedrichs-Universität in Halle an der Saale. In 1843 he obtained his doctorate at Halle, then furthered his studies in pathology at Prague, where he was also involved with entomological research. In 1845 he became a clinical assistant to Peter Krukenberg at Halle.

Bärensprung traveled to Upper Silesia in 1848 to investigate a rampant typhus epidemic. His published study provided insights into differentiating various typhus diseases. In 1850, he founded a private medical clinic in Halle.

In 1853 he was appointed chief physician at the syphilis clinic of the Berlin Charité hospital, replacing Gustav Simon following his paralysis due to neurosyphilis, and in 1857 became an associate professor at the University of Berlin.

From 1862, Bärensprung began to show signs of illness, looking sickly and emaciated, and became confused and easily irritated. The following year, he started to suffer from delusions and hallucinations, and left his work in an attempt to recuperate. He was then replaced as director of the Syphilis and Skin Diseases Department of the Charité by Georg Lewin.

Following a stay at the psychiatric clinic in Hornheim Bärensprung took a walk around the castle in nearby Kiel, where he fell from a narrow jetty into the sea and drowned. An autopsy confirmed a diagnosis of Dementia paralytica, an illness caused by syphilis infection.

== Work ==
Bärensprung is credited as being the first physician to demonstrate a definite link between herpes zoster and a lesion of the dorsal root ganglion. Subsequently, he identified nine varieties of the disorder, of which he classified according to the nerve involved. In 1854, he provided the first description of tinea cruris, a condition that is sometimes referred to as "Bärensprung's disease" in medical literature.

He introduced the practice of bedside thermometry (at the same time as Ludwig Traube) and the discovery of the Erythrasma fungus also made significant contributions to the field of medicine.

Bärensprung endeavoured to advance the principle of 'Syphilidation', a kind of vaccination method. At the Charité, he infected women as part of a medical experiment with syphilis, something his former university in Halle has criticised in modern times as "ethically more than merely questionable".

Through this study, Bärensprung contributed to the differentiated diagnosis of sexually transmitted diseases. He also established the dualistic theory of syphilis but his rejection of mercury treatment for syphilis led to controversy.

His report on the typhus epidemic in Upper Silesia made derogatory comments about parts of Silesian society, such as the "sluggish Slavic population" of the region, whom he accused of being kept "in ignorance and superstition" by the Catholic clergy and who were being "deceived by Jews". Despite these views, his medical contributions were deemed medically significant at the time. However, Bärensprung was subjected to a prominent and stinging rebuttal in an article by Rudolf Virchow, after criticising Virchow's conclusions on the kinds of political and medical reform needed in Upper Silesia.

Bärensprung was in favor of housing projects for the impoverished, and also advocated the creation of day nurseries and children's homes. These measures, he reasoned, were an effective means to stop the spread of epidemics such as tuberculosis and scrofulosis.

In the field of entomology, he was instrumental in the founding of the journal, Berliner Entomologische Zeitschrift, in which he published papers on Hemiptera.

Among his written works was Atlas der Hautkrankheiten, an illustrated textbook on skin diseases that was edited and published posthumously by Ferdinand von Hebra in 1867. Although Bärensprung earned significant recognition in the field of dermatology, subsequent evidence has shown that his treatments were flawed, and he inadvertently mistreated his patients and himself.

== Selected publications ==
=== Medical ===
- Beiträge zur Anatomie und Pathologie der menschlichen Haut (1848) - Contributions to the anatomy and pathology of human skin.
- Der Typhus in Obeschlesien im Jahre 1848 - Typhus in Upper Silesia in the year 1848.
- Epidemie von exanthemischen Typhus (1849) - Epidemic of mixed-exanthem typhus.
- Untersuchungen über die Temperaturvehältnisse des Foetus und des erwachsenen Menschen im gesunden und kranken Zustande (1851–52)
- Ueber die Folge und den Verlauf epidemischer Krankheiten. Beobachtungen aus der medizinischen Geschichte und Statistik der Stadt Halle (1854) - On the pathology of epidemic diseases.
- Die Gürtelkrankheit (1861) - On shingles.
- Über hereditäre Syphilis (1864) - On hereditary syphilis.

=== Entomological ===
- Synonymische Bemerkungen. Ueber Hemiptera.Berliner Entomologische Zeitschrift Volume 2:79-81 (1858),
- Neue und seltene Rhynchoten der europäischen Fauna. Berliner Entomologische Zeitschrift 2:188-208, pl. II.(1858)
- Neue und seltene Rhynchoten der europäischen Fauna. Zweites Stück. Berliner Entomologischer Zeitschrift 3:329-338 (1859)
- Hemiptera Heteroptera Europae systematice disposita. Berliner Entomologische Zeitschrift 4:1-25 (1860).
