= Lichen scrofulosorum =

- Other names: Tuberculosis cutis lichenoides
- Specialty: Infectious diseases

Lichen scrofulosorum is a rare tuberculid that presents as a lichenoid eruption of minute papules in children and adolescents with tuberculosis. The lesions are usually asymptomatic, closely grouped, skin-colored to reddish-brown papules, often perifollicular and are mainly found on the abdomen, chest, back, and proximal parts of the limbs. The eruption is usually associated with a strongly positive tuberculin reaction. Of the three tuberculids, the incidence of lichen scrofulosorum was found to be the lowest (2%) in a large study conducted in Hong Kong. This highlights its rarity and significance as an important marker of undetected tuberculosis.

== See also ==
- Tuberculid
- List of cutaneous conditions
