= Jean-Louis Alibert =

French dermatologist

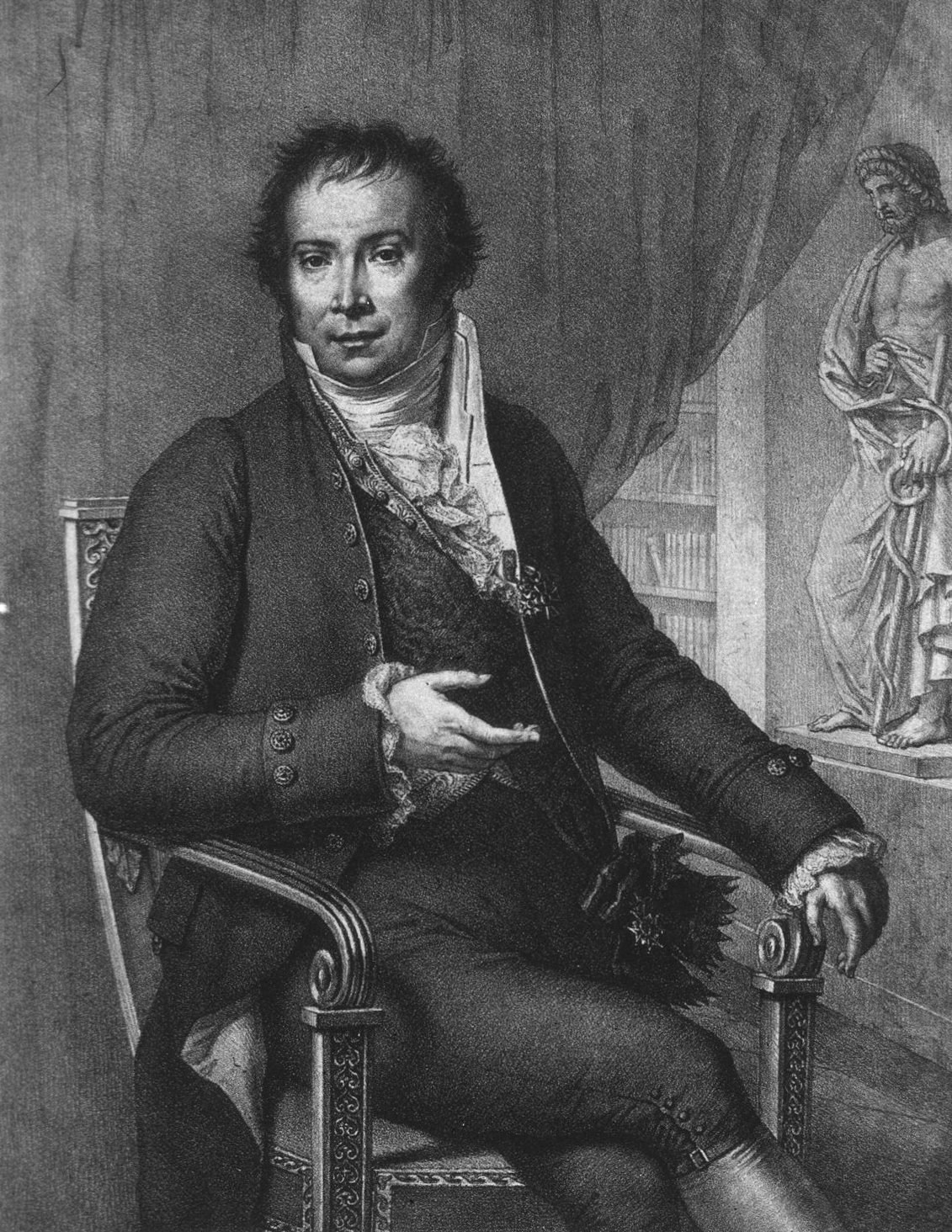
Jean-Louis Marie Alibert

Jean-Louis Marie Alibert (Note: Sometimes erroneously referred to as Jean-Louis Marc Alibert.) (2 May 1768 – 4 November 1837) was a French dermatologist born in Villefranche-de-Rouergue, Aveyron. He was a pioneer of dermatology.

== Life and work ==
Originally planning to enter the priesthood, Alibert did not begin studying medicine until he was 26 years old. As a medical student in Paris, he studied with renowned physicians that included Pierre-Joseph Desault (1744–1795), Jean-Nicolas Corvisart (1755–1821), Xavier Bichat (1771–1802) and Philippe Pinel (1745–1826). In 1801 he was appointed médecin adjoint to the Hôpital Saint-Louis (then known as the Hospice du Nord), where he administered to patients with skin disorders, syphilis and leprosy. Following the Restoration of the French monarchy, Alibert became a personal physician to Louis XVIII. Later he was a personal physician to Charles X, and was awarded with the title of "baron". Being that there was no chair of dermatology in Paris, Alibert was appointed professor of materia medica and therapeutics in 1823.

Alibert believed that when diagnosing skin disorders several criteria needed to be used, and attempted to introduce a classification system for diseases that was similar to the method Bernard and Antoine Laurent de Jussieu used in botany. Alibert first classified dermatological disorders according to outer appearance, then he divided them into what he called families, genera and species. This system of classification was represented pictorially by Alibert as the "Tree of Dermatoses". Reportedly, from his "tree", Alibert wished to introduce a method rather than a classification system.

Alibert was a prodigious writer, his best known work being the beautifully illustrated Descriptions des maladies de la peau. His literary work also included biographies of famed scientists such as Lazzaro Spallanzani (1729–1799) and Luigi Galvani (1737–1798).

In 1806, he was the first to describe a patient with mycosis fungoides. The disease was formerly referred to as "Alibert-Bazin syndrome", named in conjunction with dermatologist Pierre-Antoine-Ernest Bazin (1807–1878).

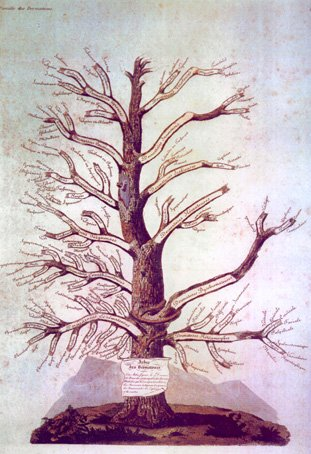
Arbre des dermatoses (Tree of Dermatoses)

In 1818, he was the first to describe a patient with psoriatic arthritis.

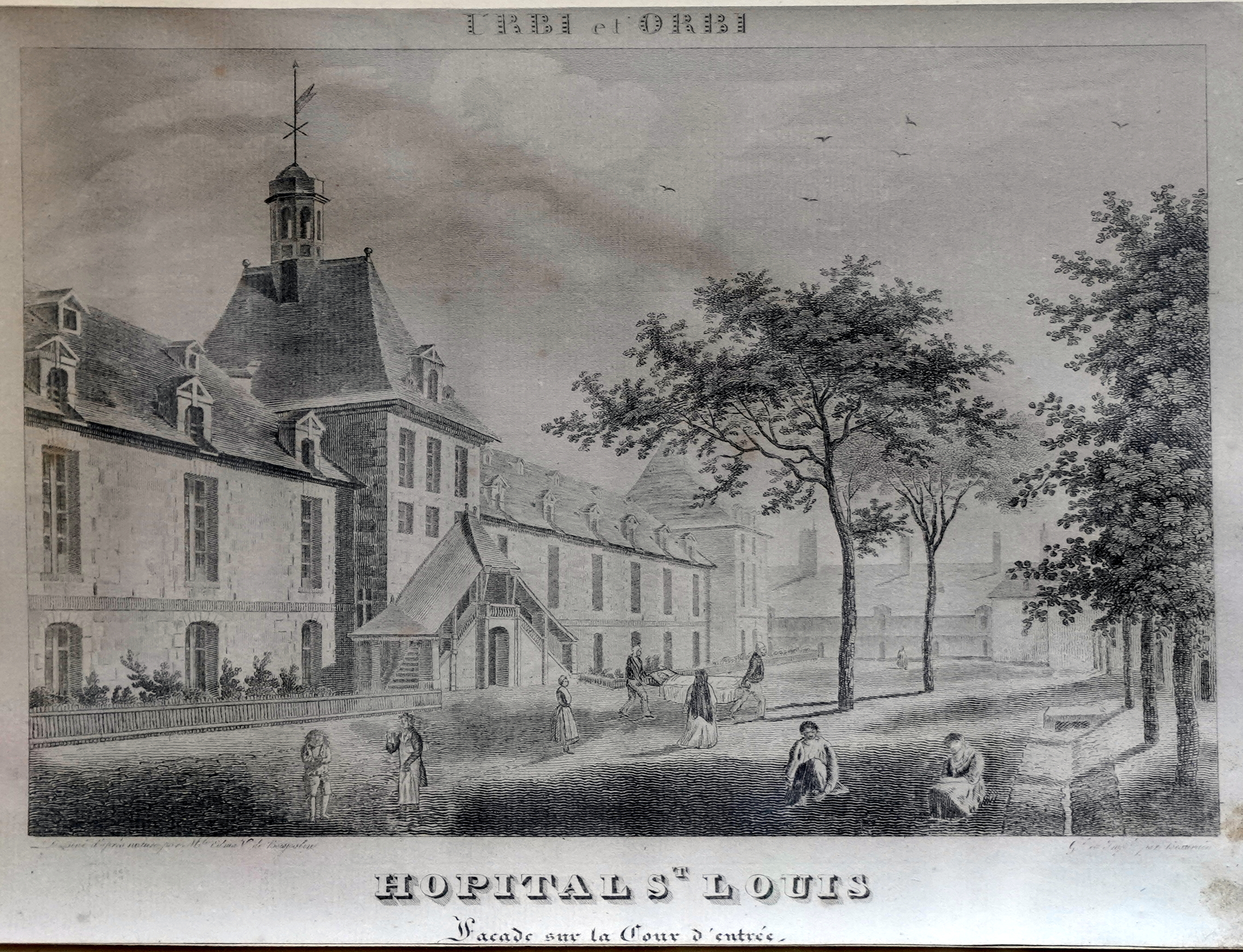
Hôpital Saint-Louis

== See also ==
- List of dermatologists

== Selected bibliography ==
- Dissertation sur les fièvres pernicieuses ou ataxiques intermittentes, Doctoral thesis (1799).
- Alibert JLM (1806). Descriptions des maladies de la peau observées a l'Hôpital Saint-Louis, et exposition des meilleures méthodes suivies pour leur traitement (in French). Paris: Barrois l’ainé. p. 286.
- Alibert JLM (1826–1827). Physiologie des passions, ou, Nouvelle doctrine des sentimens moraux (in French) (2e éd. rév., corr. et augm. ed.). Paris: Béchet jeune.
- Alibert JLM (1835). Monographie des dermatoses (in French) (2nd ed.). Paris: Germer Balliere.
