= William Dubreuilh =

French professor of dermatology

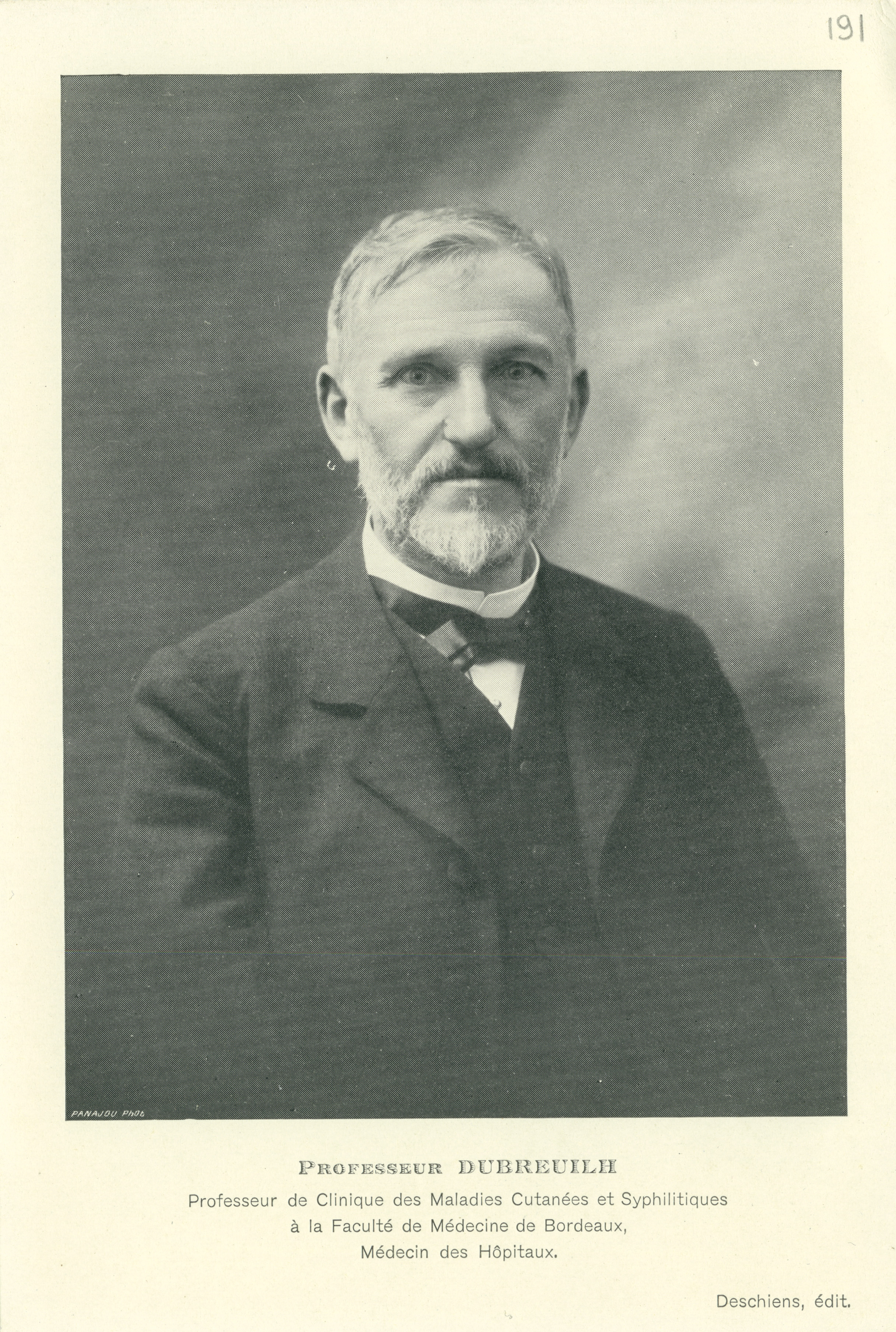
- Born: May 9, 1857; Bordeaux, France
- Died: June 16, 1935 (aged 78); Mazamet, France

William Dubreuilh (May 9, 1857 – June 16, 1935), was a French professor of dermatology. In 1896, he gave the first description of actinic keratosis.

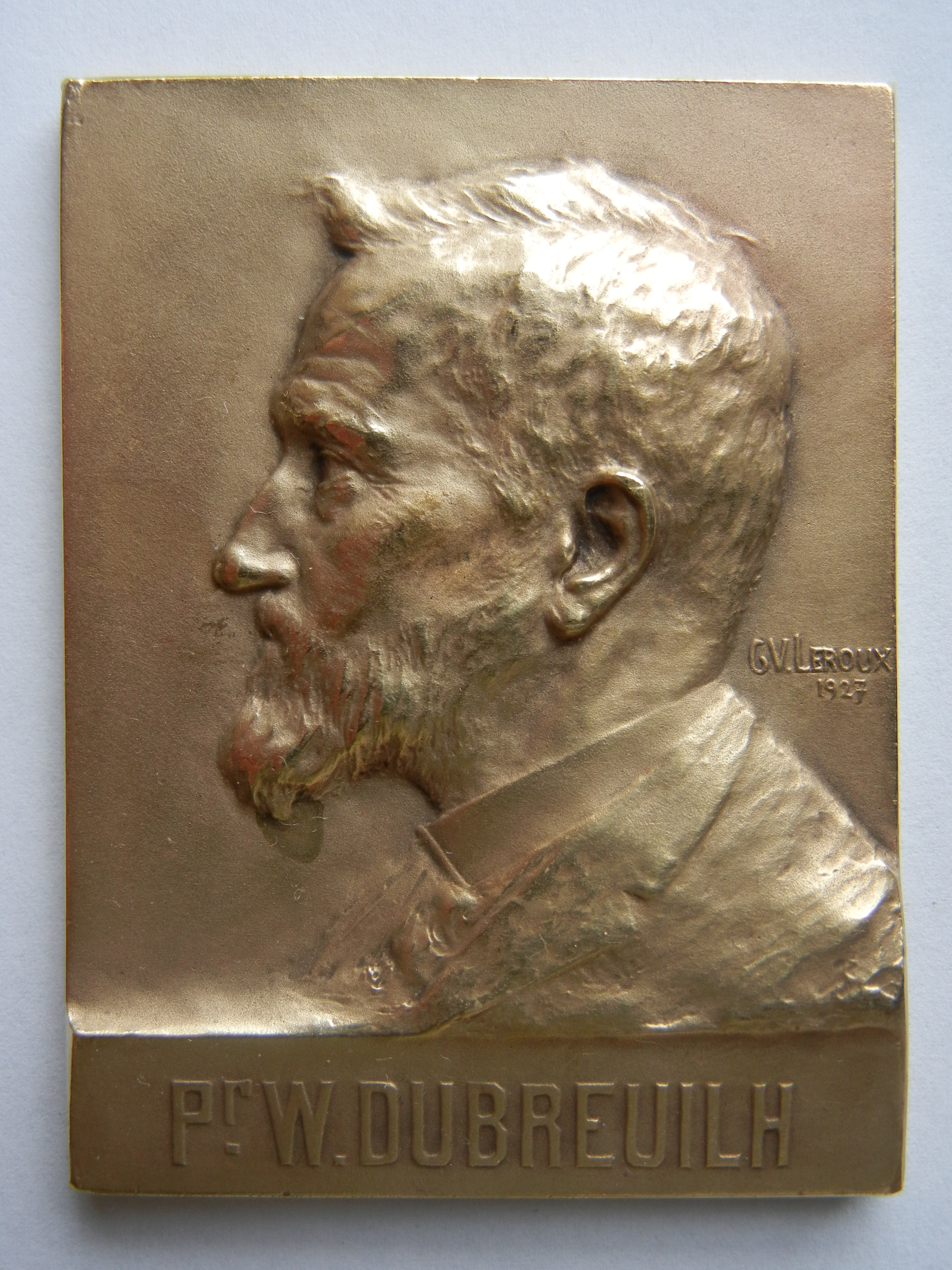
Dubreuilh medal 1927 (front)

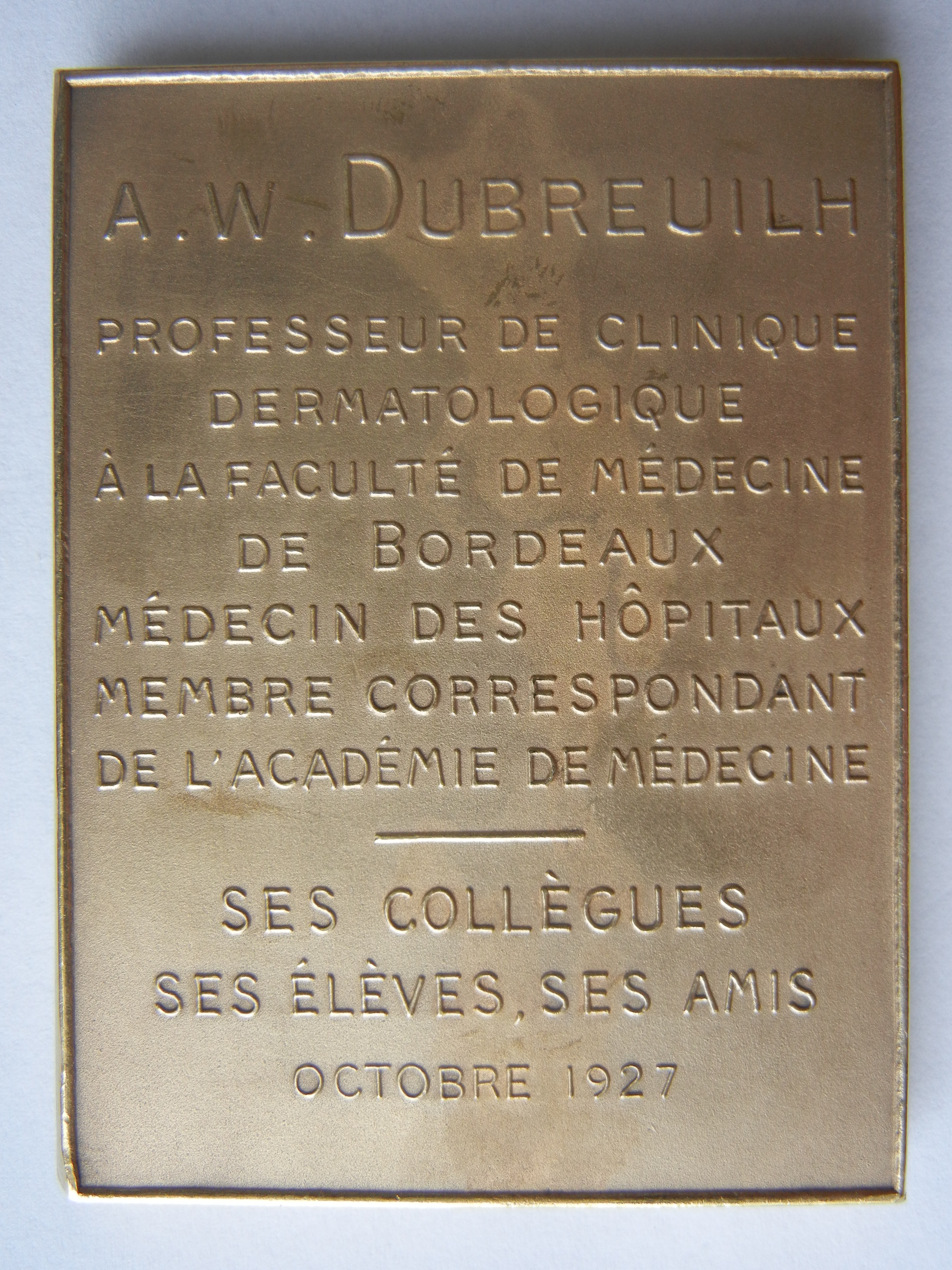
Dubreuilh medal 1927 (back)
