= American Society for Dermatologic Surgery =

The American Society for Dermatologic Surgery (ASDS) is an organization representing board certified dermatologic surgeons who diagnose and treat conditions affecting the skin, hair, and nails through a broad range of procedures that includes skin cancer surgery, reconstruction, and cosmetic treatments. It has over 6,400 members who are recognized as leaders in the field of dermatology and not only lead the field of specialists in the treatment of skin cancer but also treat skin and soft tissue in both medical and cosmetic surgical and non-surgical methods. Its members are pioneers in the field that have contributed to the creation of many of the devices used in the aesthetic cosmetic industry as well as skin cancer prevention, detection, and surgery.

== History ==
Created in 1970, they serve to promote the educational and professional interests of dermatologic surgeons, provide advocacy and public education efforts on behalf of surgeons and patients, address socioeconomic issues that impact the practice of dermatologic surgery.
