= Georg Richard Lewin =

German dermatologist

Georg Lewin
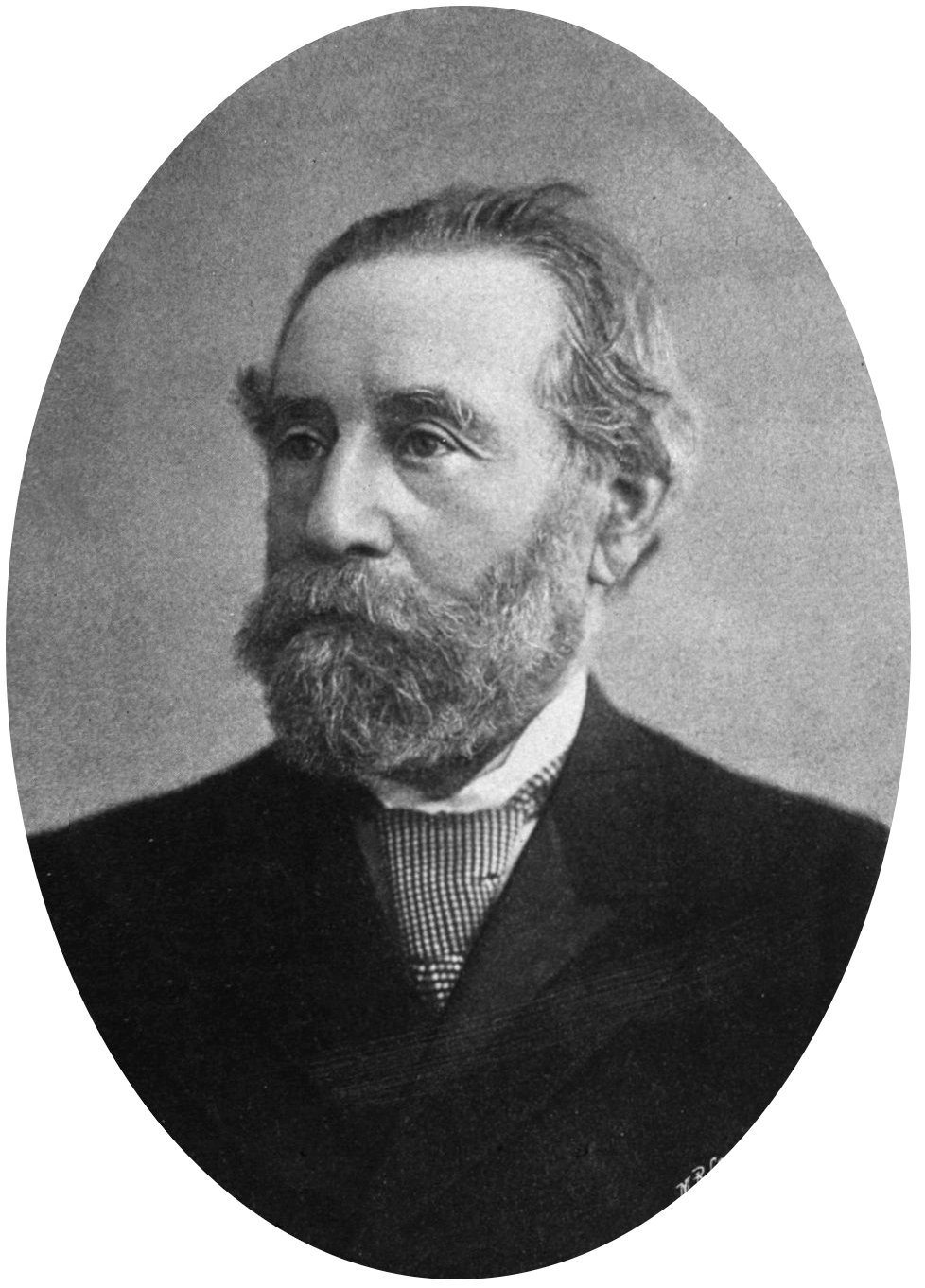
- Born: 19 April 1820; Sondershausen, Schwarzburg-Sondershausen (Thuringia)
- Died: 1 November 1896 (aged 76); Berlin, Kingdom of Prussia
- Known for: Research into syphilis, leukoderma, erythema, scleroderma
- Scientific career
- Fields: Dermatology

Georg Richard Lewin (19 April 1820 – 1 November 1896) was a German dermatologist, known for his research into syphilis and various skin diseases.

== Biography ==
Lewin was born in Sondershausen in the principality of Schwarzburg-Sondershausen (modern-day Thuringia), attending Gymnasium there and later in Magdeburg and Mühlhausen. He completed his Abitur in 1841.

He was further educated at the universities of Halle and Berlin, graduating as doctor of medicine in 1845. After a postgraduate course at the universities of Vienna, Würzburg, and Paris he settled in Berlin, where he practised as a specialist first in otology, and later in dermatology and syphilis. In 1862 Lewin was admitted to the medical faculty of his alma mater as privat-docent in otology.

In 1865 he became chief physician in the Syphilis and Skin Diseases Department at the Charité hospital in Berlin, replacing Felix von Bärensprung. In 1868 he was appointed associate professor for laryngology and dermatology at the Friedrich Wilhelm University. The following year published his influential research on the treatment of syphilis using subcutaneous injections of mercuric chloride.

In 1880 Lewin became a member of the imperial department of health, and in 1884 received the title of "Geheimer Medicinalrat." In the same year, through the influence of Otto von Bismarck, Lewin's clinic was divided into two departments, Lewin retaining the class in syphilis, while Ernst Schweninger, Bismarck's physician, was appointed chief physician for dermatology. This action of the government aroused much indignation in the medical faculties of most of the universities of Germany, and much public sympathy was expressed for Lewin.

== Publications ==
He was an industrious writer, and contributed many essays to the medical journals:

- "Klinik der Krankheiten des Kehlkopfes," 2d ed., Berlin, 1863;
- "Inhalationstherapie und Krankheiten der Respirationsorgane," 2d ed., ib. 1865;
- "Behandlung der Syphilis Durch Subcutane Sublimatinjectionen," ib. 1869.
