= Dina Strachan =

American academic dermatologist

Dina D. Strachan (pronounced ‘strawn’) is an academic dermatologist, book author, blogger and media medical expert.

== Early life and education ==
Strachan's mother, also a physician, waited until Dina was seven years old to pierce her ears, so that her twin brother would not pull on the earrings. This was later than most little girls of West Indian descent of her generation.

Strachan obtained her undergraduate and medical degrees from Harvard and Yale and trained as a dermatologist at the University of California-San Francisco. She joined the faculty at New York University.

== Career ==
In addition to running a private dermatology practice in New York City, Strachan has commented on treatments for skin problems and hair loss for The New York Times and other media outlets.

In 2005, Strachan founded Findablackdoctor.com after failing to find a similar service online.

In 2018, Strachan published Moxie Mindset: Secrets of Building a Profitable, Independent Physicians Practice in a Competitive Market. In the book, she describes how her initial reluctance to entrepreneurship gave way to a business mindset that complemented her pride in serving her community.

In 2024, Strachan authored a resolution for the American Academy of Dermatology, 005, to support Diversity, Equity, and Inclusion (DEI) initiatives and form a task force on antisemitism, anti-Arab bias, and Islamophobia. She presented her rationale for supporting this version of DEI at the 2024 AAD national meeting.

== Publications ==
=== Books and chapters ===
- Strachan, Dina D. (2009). "The Dermatological Manifestations of HIV Infection in Ethnic Skin". In Stone, Valerie; Ojikutu, Bisola; Rawlings, M. Keith; Smith, Kimberly Y. (eds.). HIV/AIDS in U.S. Communities of Color. New York, NY: Springer. pp. 133–157. doi:10.1007/978-0-387-98152-9_8. ISBN 978-0-387-98152-9.
- Strachan, Dina D. (2018-03-12). Moxie Mindset: Secrets of Building a Profitable, Independent Physicians Practice in a Competitive Market. Purposely Created Publishing Group. ISBN 978-1948400619.

=== Articles ===
- Strachan, Dina D. (May 2001). "Evaluation of hair loss". Female Patient. 26 (5): 39–44.
- Taylor, Susan; Cook-Bolden, Fran; Rahman, Zakia; Strachan, Dina (2002). "Acne vulgaris in skin of color". Journal of the American Academy of Dermatology. 46 (2 Suppl): S98-106. doi:10.1067/mjd.2002.120791.
- Strachan, Dina D.; Okereke, Uchenna (2012). "Hair care practices and their association with scalp and hair disorders in African American girls". Journal of the American Academy of Dermatology. 66 (1): 157–159. doi:10.1016/j.jaad.2011.05.054.
- Akoh, Christine C.; Shankar, Shruthi; Strachan, Dina D.; Latkowski, Jo-Ann M. (2022-08-01). "Diversifying the dermatology workforce: Physician characteristics vary by race/ethnicity". Journal of the National Medical Association. 114 (4): 369–376. doi:10.1016/j.jnma.2022.02.011. ISSN 0027-9684.

== Media ==
Strachan was featured on the Netflix docuseries The Black Beauty Effect.
