= Atlas der Hautkrankheiten =

Dermatological book

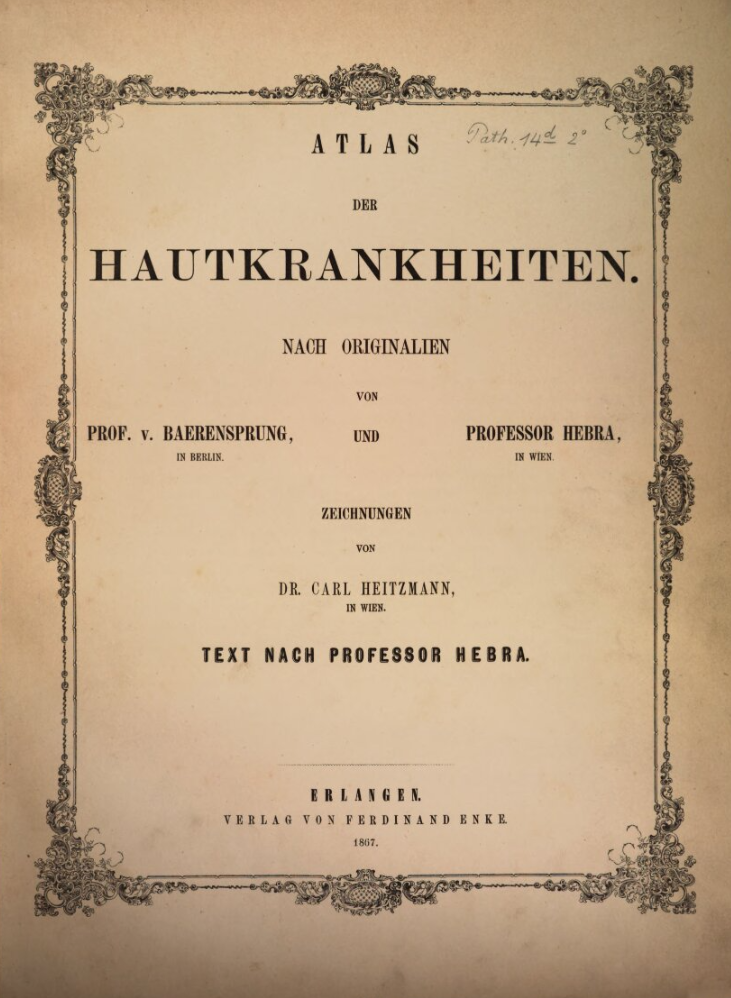
- Title page for the 1867 edition
- Editor: Ferdinand von Hebra
- Authors: Ferdinand von Hebra, Felix von Bärensprung
- Illustrators: Anton Elfinger, Carl Heitzmann
- Language: German
- Subject: Dermatology
- Genre: Medical textbook
- Publisher: Ferdinand Enke, Carl Gerold’s Sohn Verlag
- Publication date: 1856-1876

The Atlas der Hautkrankheiten (Atlas of Skin Diseases) was an influential work in the field of dermatology, published in ten editions between 1856 and 1876.

== History ==
In 1843, the Viennese dermatology professor Ferdinand von Hebra began a project collecting accurate sketches of all skin diseases known to medicine at the time, hiring the medical student Anton Elfinger as its illustrator. The first edition was published in 1856, comprising 10 picture plates on the topic of cutaneous lupus in a brochured pad made of thin cardboard.

Separately in 1859, Berlin-based dermatologist Felix von Bärensprung was commissioned by science publisher Ferdinand Enke to produce a comprehensive guide to skin diseases, though this was not completed due to Bärensprung's death as a result of a syphilis infection.

Enke approached Hebra to see whether he could continue Bärensprung's research and incorporate it into his own work. Hebra edited Bärensprung's text and built upon it, inheriting previous illustrations made in Berlin under Bärensprung by an illustrator named R. Schwedler, while commissioning new colour lithographed illustrations of Viennese patients from Carl Heitzmann, due to Elfinger's worsening tuberculosis infection.

Elfinger died in 1864, though his name continued to be credited as illustrator alongside Heitzmann in every subsequent edition's title page. By 1869, Enke had also died, and editions after this time were published by the Carl Gerold’s Sohn Verlag and printed by the Austrian Kaiserlich-königliche Hof- und Staatsdruckerei (Imperial and Royal Court and State Printing Office).

By its 10th edition in 1876, the atlas included research by other influential dermatologists of the time, such as microscopic studies and histopathological works by Gustav Simon. The final work comprised 104 picture plates, with each disease represented in two variants: one as a colour lithography printed with four plates, and the other as a black-and-white pen lithography.

In 1880, Ferdinand von Hebra died and no further editions of the Atlas were published.

== Influence ==
The atlas is regarded as a milestone in the history of dermatology. The Wilhelm Fabry Museum, which specialises in the history of medicine and retains several editions of the Atlas as part of its collection, describes the works as "to this day a pinnacle of medical documentation and illustration art" due to their "naturalistic precision of the depiction and the precise descriptions of the symptoms".

== Selected Images ==
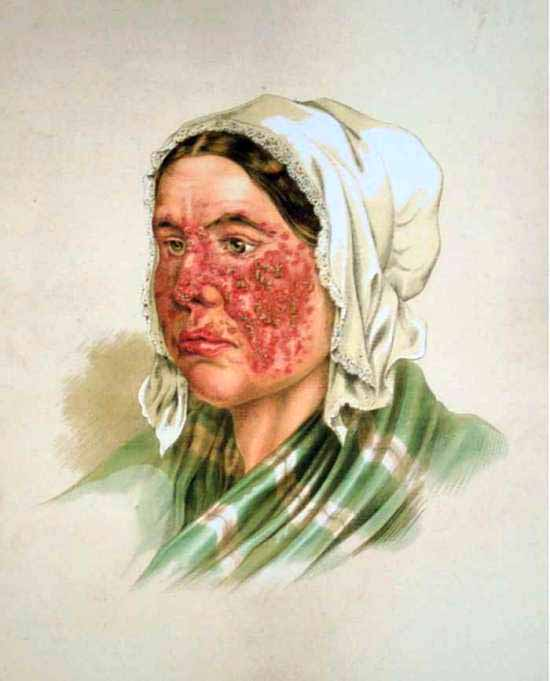
A lithograph from the Atlas depicting a woman with Lupus erythematosus.

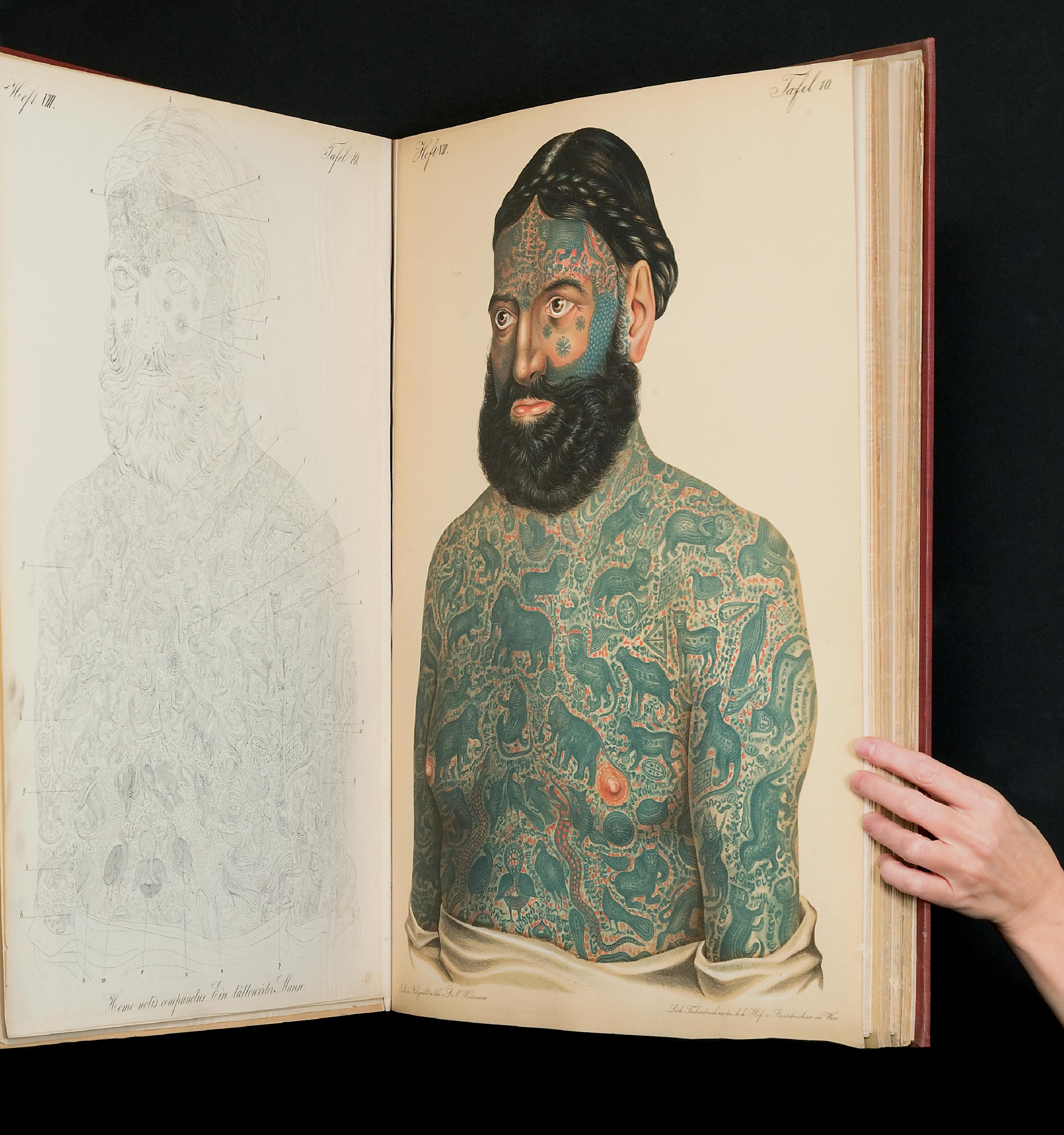
Image of a lithograph of a man with a full body tattoo.

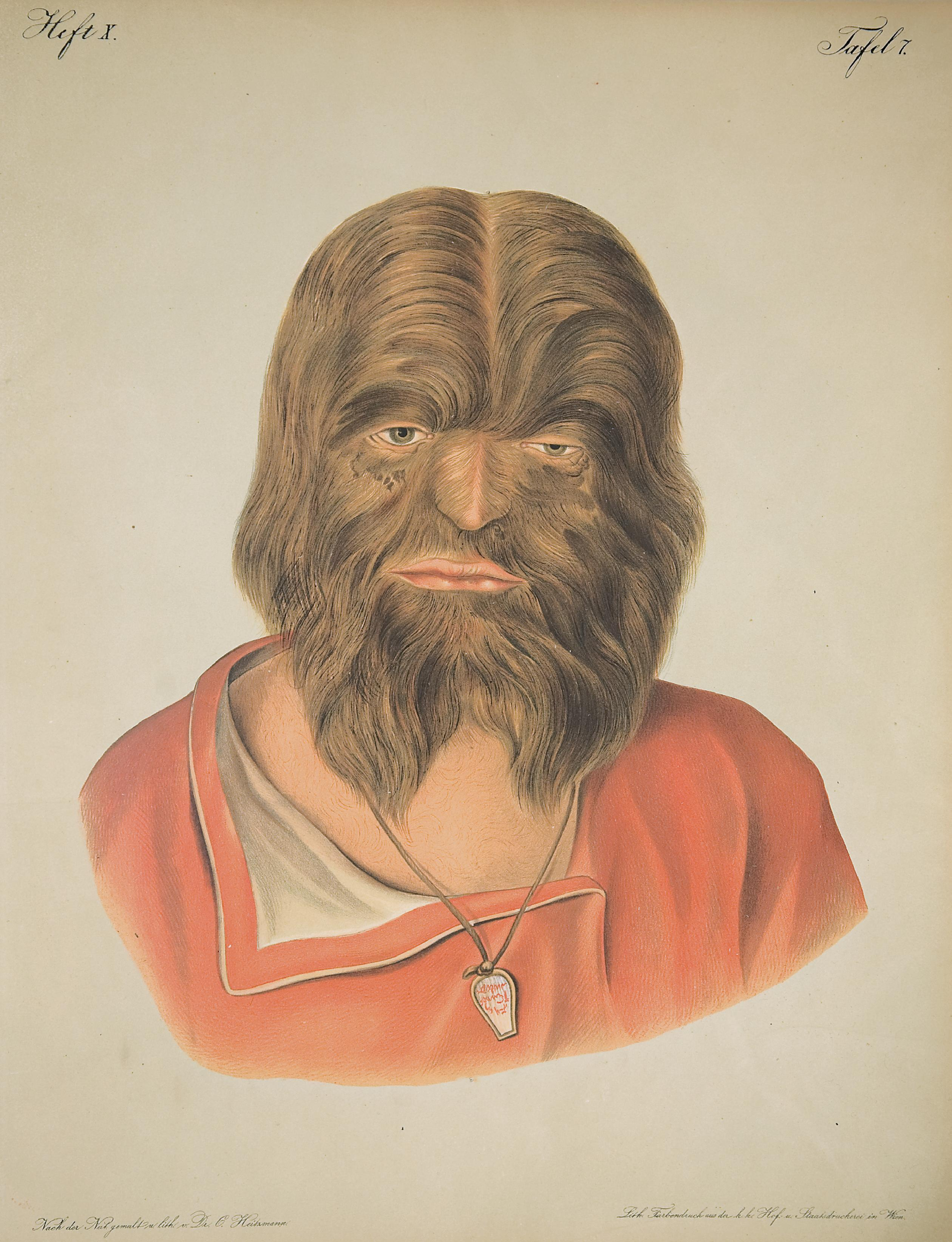
A lithograph of a man whose face is completely covered in brown hair.

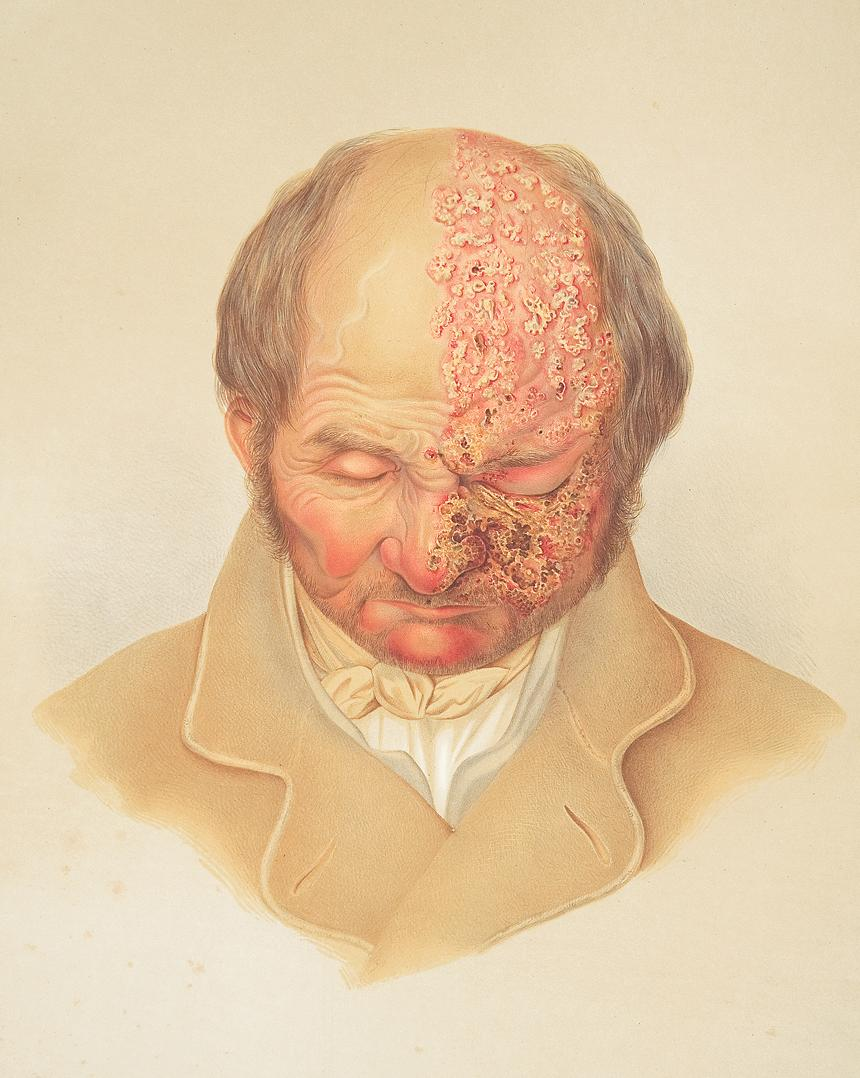
A lithograph showing a man with herpes zoster (shingles).
