= Ferdinand Ritter von Hebra =

Austrian physician and dermatologist (1816–1880)

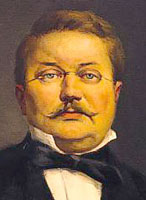
- Ferdinand Ritter von Hebra
- Born: 7 September 1816; Brno, Moravia, Austrian Empire
- Died: 5 August 1880 (aged 63); Vienna, Austria-Hungary
- Education: University of Vienna
- Known for: Vienna School of Dermatology
- Scientific career
- Fields: Dermatology

Ferdinand Karl Franz Schwarzmann, Ritter von Hebra (7 September 1816 – 5 August 1880) was an Austrian medical doctor and dermatologist known as the founder of the Vienna School of Dermatology, an important group of physicians who established the foundations of modern dermatology.

== Life ==
Ferdinand Schwarzmann von Hebra was born in Brno, Moravia, Austrian Empire (in the present-day Czech Republic), to a military officer. He first studied in Graz, then entered the University of Vienna and graduated in medicine in 1841. He was influenced by Carl Freiherr von Rokitansky, one of the founders of modern pathological anatomy.

Though not its original discoverer, von Hebra's 1844 research dispelled any remaining doubt that the itch mite was the cause of scabies, helping to dispel the humoral theory of skin disease. This publication was the inflection point where the term 'scabies' transitioned from referring to a collection of non-specific itchy ailments, to a particular pathological process specifically caused by the itch mite.

In the second half of the 19th century, Hebra introduced resurfacing and restoring skin with chemical peel. He used exfoliative agents, like phenol, croton oil, nitric acid in various cautious combination for treating freckles and skin irregularities. He greatly influenced Carl Mayrhofer, who continued Semmelweis's research on puerperal fever.

In 1856, Hebra published the first edition of the influential Atlas der Hautkrankheiten (Atlas of Skin Diseases), which by 1876 had reached its 10th edition and incorporated research by Felix von Bärensprung and illustrations by two of the leading medical illustrators of Austria, Anton Elfinger and Carl Heitzmann.

In 1878, Hebra began writing another milestone work, the Lehrbuch der Hautkrankheiten (Textbook of Skin Diseases). However this book was not finished during Hebra's lifetime and was instead completed by his former student, the dermatologist Moritz Kaposi. The book was internationally influential in the field of dermatology and was translated into English, French, Italian and Russian.

Following the death of Carl von Rokitansky in July 1878, Hebra was elected president of the College of Physicians in Vienna. He died on 5 August 1880, in Vienna, of pulmonary emphysema before chairing a single meeting. During the College's first subsequent gathering, Hebra's colleague and friend Heinrich von Bamberger provided a eulogy, stating Hebra's death meant that "one more name adorns the pantheon of Austrian scholars".

== Legacy ==
Hebra's research was influential in his time, to the extent that "his clinic became the mecca and shifted the centre of dermatology from England and France to Austria", according to the medical historians Walter B. Shelley and John T. Crissey, who describe Hebra as "by far the most important" dermatologist in the 19th century. In the early 20th century, medical historian Victor Robinson described Hebra as "the undisputed potentate of Hautkrankheiten [skin diseases]" in his lifetime.

Hebra was known to his contemporaries as an engaging teacher and interesting speaker, combining both sympathy and satire into his talks. He taught many students who went on to be influential dermatologists in their own right, such as Kaposi, Auspitz and Neumann.

== Semmelweis and Hebra ==
An early supporter of Ignaz Semmelweis and the editor of a leading Austrian medical journal, Hebra announced Semmelweis's discovery that handwashing with chloride of lime reduces the incidence of puerperal fever in the December 1847 and April 1848 issues of the Viennese medical journal. Hebra claimed that Semmelweis's work had a practical significance comparable to that of Edward Jenner's introduction of cowpox inoculations to prevent smallpox.

Hebra was the only friend who kept in touch with Semmelweis after his departure from Vienna.

Due to Semmelweis's suffering from severe depression and other mental problems, János Balassa signed a document which committed him to a mental institution. On 30 July 1865 Hebra was one of the party who arranged Semmelweis's fake trip to his "new water-cure hospital", actually taking the long-time friend into a Viennese asylum for the insane located in the Lazarettgasse (Landes-Irren-Anstalt in der Lazarettgasse). On arrival there, Semmelweis guessed what was happening and tried to leave, but he was forcibly subdued by the asylum's guards and died two weeks later from a gangrenous wound which may have been caused by the struggle.

Hebra was not amongst the attendees of Semmelweis' funeral and made no further mention of him during his lifetime. No additional references to Semmelweis have been noted in any of Hebra's papers; it has been pointed out, however, that a comprehensive biography of Hebra is currently lacking.

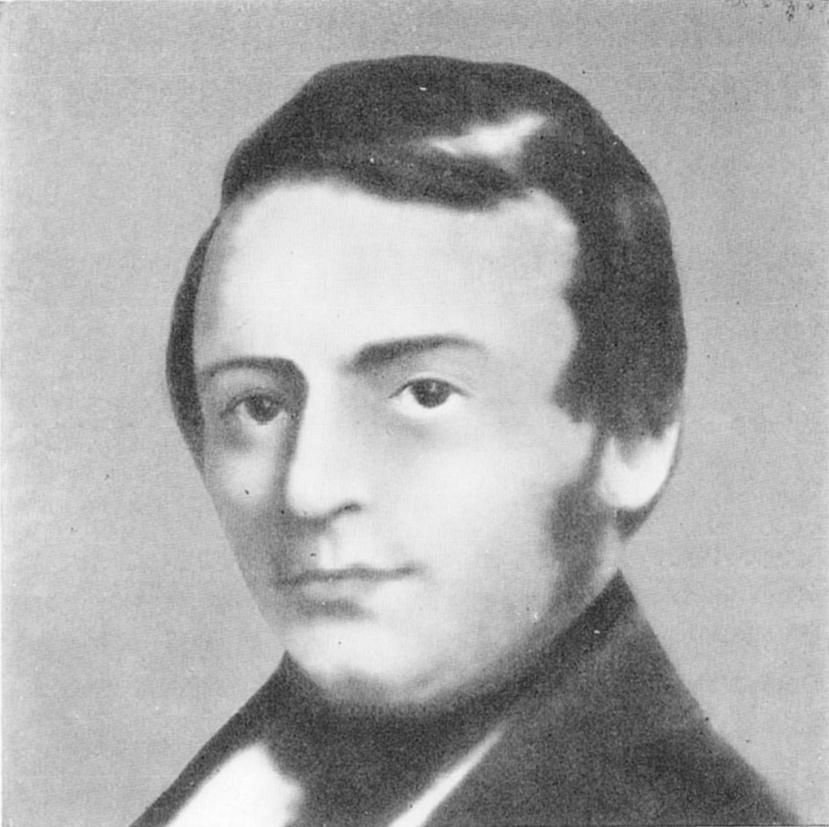
Young (undated image)

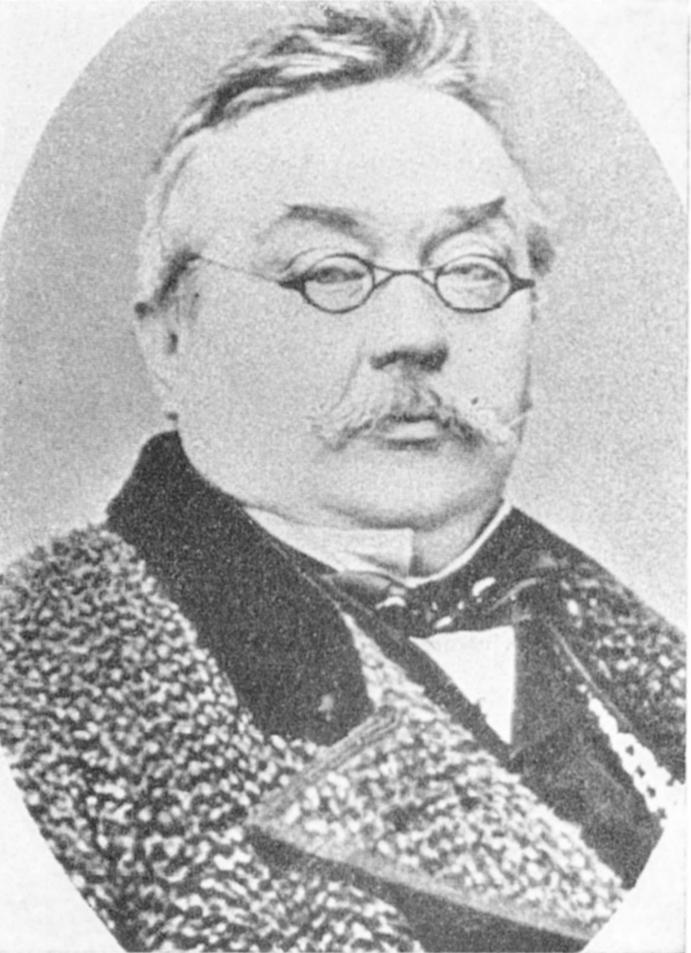
Old (undated image)

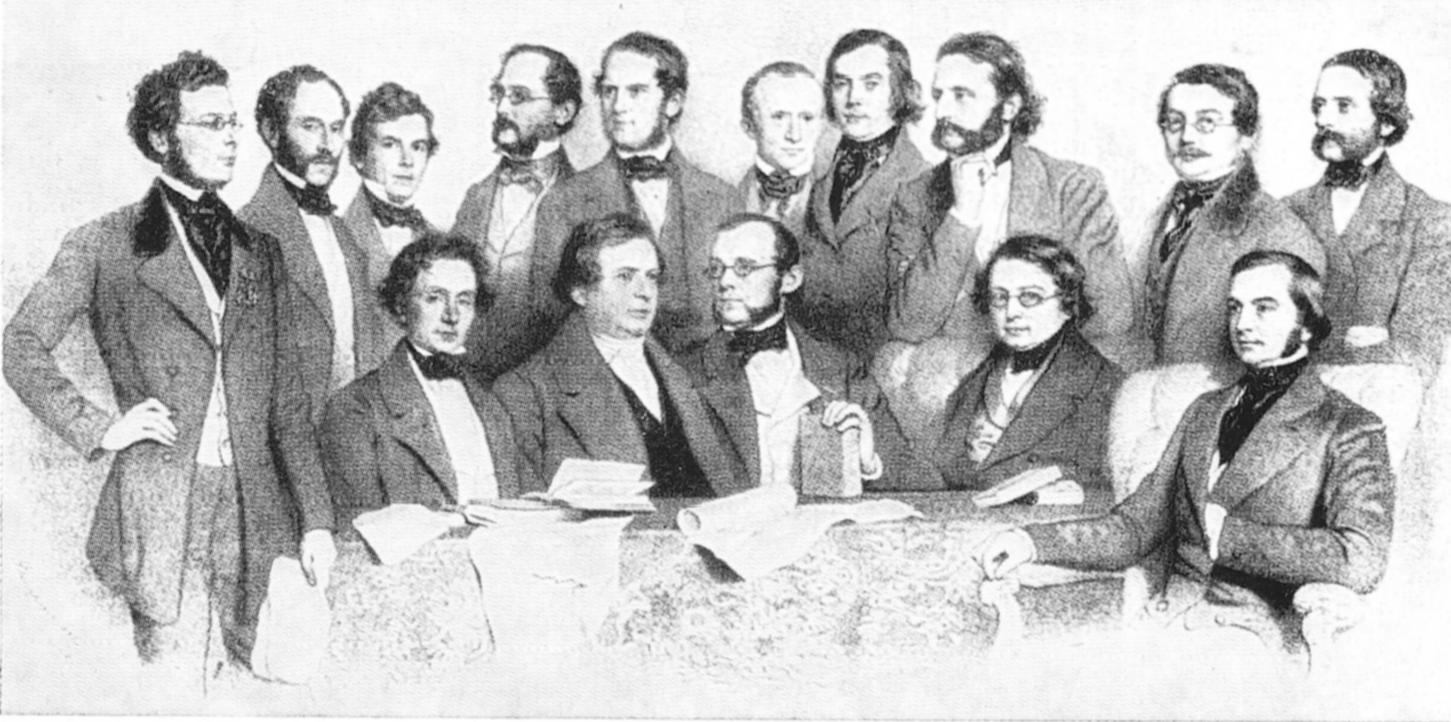
With colleagues in Vienna, 1853

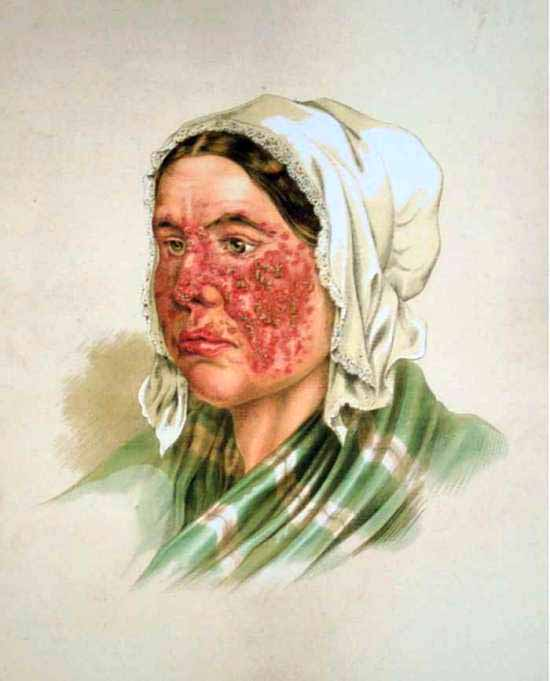
Lupus erythematosus, illustration from Hebra's Atlas of Skin Diseases

== Sources ==
- Aniyathodiyil, Preetha Unni (2020-04-17). "Von Hebra – Legend in dermatology". Journal of Skin and Sexually Transmitted Diseases. 2 (1): 35–36. doi:10.25259/JSSTD_41_2019.
- Benedek, István (1983). Ignaz Phillip Semmelweis 1818–1865. Druckerei Kner, Gyomaendrőd, Hungary: Corvina Kiadó (Translated from Hungarian to German by Brigitte Engel). ISBN 963-13-1459-6.
- Carter, K. Codell (1985). "Ignaz Semmelweis, Carl Mayrhofer, and the Rise of Germ Theory". Medical History. 29 (25): 33–53. doi:10.1017/S0025727300043738. PMC 1139480. PMID 3883083.
- Gortvay, Gyorgy; Zoltan, Imre (1968). Semmelweis: His Life and Work. Budapest: Akademiai Kiado. p. 236.
- Holubar, Karl (1981). "Ferdinand von Hebra 1816–1880: On the Occasion of the Centenary of His Death". International Journal of Dermatology. 20 (4): 291–295. doi:10.1111/j.1365-4362.1981.tb04341.x. PMID 7016771. S2CID 29240315.
- Morris, Malcolm (1897-09-18). "The Rise and Progress of Dermatology". The British Medical Journal. 2 (1916): 697–702. doi:10.1136/bmj.2.1916.697. JSTOR 20251313. PMC 2407624.
- Sinclair, William J. (1909). Semmelweis: his life and doctrine : A chapter in the history of medicine. Manchester: University of Leeds Library.
- Shampo, Marc A; Davis, Mark D P (November 2006). "Dermatologists honored on stamps". Arch Dermatol. 142 (11): 1489–92. doi:10.1001/archderm.142.11.1489. PMID 17116842.
- Pretterklieber, M L (July 1996). "Ferdinand Ritter von Hebra--founder of modern dermatology". Isr. J. Med. Sci. 32 (7): 584. PMID 8756989.
- Tappeiner, J; Holubar, K (September 1981). "[Ferdinand von Hebra: the man and his work (author's transl)]". Wien. Klin. Wochenschr. 93 (16): 503–6. PMID 7029925.
- Carter, K. C.; Abbott, S.; Siebach, J. L. (1995). "Five Documents Relating to the Final Illness and Death of Ignaz Semmelweis". Bulletin of the History of Medicine. 69 (2): 255–270. JSTOR 44444549. PMID 7613067.
