= Clay J. Cockerell =

- Education: Texas Tech University; Baylor College of Medicine (MD); Jack Welch Management Institute (MBA); Georgetown University (MA); Abraham Lincoln University (JD)
- Occupations: Dermatologist, dermatopathologist, educator
- Known for: Dermatopathology; early description of bacillary angiomatosis in AIDS patients
- Spouse: Brenda West Cockerell
- Children: 2

Clay J. Cockerell is an American dermatologist, dermatopathologist, educator, physician executive, and entrepreneur known for contributions to dermatopathology, melanoma diagnosis, HIV-associated skin disease, and dermatologic education. He is founder and medical director of Cockerell Dermatopathology in Dallas, Texas, Chair of the Lake Granbury Dermatology Residency program, former president and secretary-treasurer of the American Academy of Dermatology (AAD), and former director of the Division of Dermatopathology at the University of Texas Southwestern Medical Center.

Cockerell is recognized for early work describing bacillary angiomatosis in patients with AIDS, for advancing clinicopathologic correlation in dermatology and dermatopathology, and for his longstanding role in dermatopathology education and fellowship training. In 2021, he was inducted into the Dermatology Hall of Fame.

== Early life and education ==
Cockerell was born in Houston, Texas, and raised in Abilene, Texas. He attended Cooper High School before enrolling at Texas Tech University, where he studied zoology, microbiology, and chemistry. He entered Baylor College of Medicine through an early admission program and received his Doctor of Medicine degree with honors in 1981.

He completed an internship in internal medicine at the University of Washington-affiliated hospitals in Seattle, followed by residency training in dermatology at New York University Medical Center, where he served as chief resident from 1984 to 1985. He subsequently completed fellowship training in dermatopathology under A. Bernard Ackerman, regarded as one of the founders of modern dermatopathology. During this period he also trained in pathology at Memorial Sloan Kettering Cancer Center.

Later in his career, Cockerell earned a Master of Business Administration from the Jack Welch Management Institute and a master's degree in commercial real estate from Georgetown University. In 2023, he earned a Juris Doctor degree from Abraham Lincoln University and subsequently passed the California Bar Examination.

He is board-certified in dermatology and dermatopathology.

== Career ==
=== Academic medicine ===
Cockerell joined the faculty of the University of Texas Southwestern Medical Center in 1988 and served for many years as director of the Division of Dermatopathology. He holds the title of Clinical Professor of Dermatology and Pathology at UT Southwestern.

During his tenure as director of dermatopathology at UT Southwestern, Cockerell trained more than 100 dermatopathology fellows, many of whom later assumed academic and leadership positions at medical centers and dermatology programs throughout the United States. He has also trained dermatology residents, pathology residents, and visiting physicians, and has been associated with clinicopathologic correlation-based teaching in dermatology education.

In 2014, the Robert G. Freeman, M.D. and Clay J. Cockerell, M.D. Chair in Dermatopathology was established at UT Southwestern through philanthropic support from both physicians.

Cockerell later became program director of the ACGME-accredited dermatology residency program affiliated with Lake Granbury Medical Center in Texas, established to expand community-based dermatology education. He has also served as adjunct faculty at Baylor Scott & White Health and the University of North Texas Health Science Center.

=== Professional leadership ===
Cockerell served as president of the American Academy of Dermatology from 2005 to 2006, after previously serving as Secretary-Treasurer and Assistant Secretary-Treasurer of the organization. During his tenure, he participated in initiatives related to melanoma awareness, HIV-associated skin disease, dermatopathology education, and dermatologic advocacy. He also served on the board of directors of AmeriPath, Inc. prior to its acquisition by Quest Diagnostics.

In addition, he has served as president of the Texas Dermatological Society, president of the Dallas Dermatological Society, vice president of the International Society of Dermatopathology, president of the Noah Worcester Dermatological Society, and director of the Zola Cooper–Lee Nesbitt Clinico-Pathologic Seminar.

In 2025, he was named an Honorary Member of the American Academy of Dermatology.

=== Cockerell Dermatopathology ===
Cockerell is founder and medical director of Cockerell Dermatopathology, a dermatopathology laboratory headquartered in Dallas, Texas. The laboratory evolved from Freeman–Cockerell Dermatopathology Laboratories, originally founded by Robert G. Freeman in 1972.

The practice serves dermatologists and other clinicians throughout the United States and is known for its emphasis on clinicopathologic correlation, educational outreach, and subspecialty dermatopathology consultation.

=== Dermatopathology education ===
Cockerell has been active in dermatopathology education through lectures, conferences, online educational initiatives, and continuing medical education programs.

He is founder and director of the Practical Dermatology and Dermatopathology Symposium held in Vail, Colorado, founder of the Winter Practical Dermatology and Dermatopathology Symposium, and founder of the HONE Symposium for advanced practice providers.

He is also co-founder of Dermpath On Demand, an online dermatopathology educational platform featuring lectures, unknown slide sessions, and virtual microscopy teaching.

He has delivered hundreds of invited lectures nationally and internationally and has participated in educational programs organized by the American Academy of Dermatology, the American Society of Dermatopathology, the American Society of Clinical Pathology, and international dermatology organizations.

=== Industry and innovation ===
Cockerell has participated in dermatologic product development and intellectual property activities involving antimicrobial skin care products and ultraviolet-protective cleansing technologies.

He co-founded CLn Skin Care, a dermatology-focused skin care company emphasizing antimicrobial and barrier-supportive products, with Azam Anwar. He later stepped away from company leadership and board activities while retaining an ownership interest in the company.

He is also a named inventor on patented dermatologic cleansing technologies, including a body wash with sunscreen formulation (U.S. Patent 7,824,662) designed to incorporate ultraviolet-protective properties into cleansing products.

== Research and contributions ==
=== HIV-associated skin disease and bacillary angiomatosis ===
During the AIDS epidemic of the 1980s and 1990s, Cockerell published on HIV-associated skin disease and opportunistic infections.

In 1987, while at New York University, he co-authored a paper in The Lancet describing epithelioid angiomatosis, later known as bacillary angiomatosis, as a distinct vascular disorder occurring in patients with AIDS or AIDS-related complex. The condition was subsequently shown to be caused by Bartonella species.

Subsequent publications by Cockerell and collaborators helped characterize the clinical and histopathologic spectrum of HIV-related cutaneous disease and bacillary angiomatosis.

=== Melanoma and dermatopathology ===
Cockerell has published on the diagnosis and classification of melanocytic lesions, dysplastic nevi, actinic keratosis, and melanoma, including histopathologic criteria for melanoma diagnosis, clinicopathologic correlation, and diagnostic pitfalls in dermatopathology.

His publications have also addressed actinic keratosis classification, melanoma staging, and the role of ancillary molecular and histopathologic diagnostic techniques in melanocytic lesions.

=== Artificial intelligence and digital pathology ===
More recently, Cockerell has published on artificial intelligence and digital pathology in dermatology and dermatopathology, including ethical considerations surrounding AI-assisted diagnosis.

His work has included publications on machine learning applications in skin cancer diagnosis, gene-expression profiling technologies, and noninvasive diagnostic tools for melanoma evaluation.

== Publications and editorial work ==
Cockerell has authored or co-authored more than 750 scientific articles, abstracts, chapters, books, posters, and educational publications in dermatology and dermatopathology.

He has served on the editorial boards of multiple journals, including the Journal of the American Academy of Dermatology, the American Journal of Dermatopathology, the Journal of Drugs in Dermatology, and the Journal of Clinical and Aesthetic Dermatology.

He has also served as reviewer for medical journals including The Lancet, the New England Journal of Medicine, the Journal of the American Academy of Dermatology, and the American Journal of Dermatopathology.

=== Selected books ===
- Dermatopathology: Clinicopathological Correlations
- Diagnostic Pathology: Nonneoplastic Dermatopathology
- Cutaneous Manifestations of HIV Disease
- Color Atlas of HIV Infection
- Practical Dermatopathology: A Text and Atlas

== Honors and recognition ==
- Dermatology Hall of Fame induction (2021)
- Honorary Member, American Academy of Dermatology (2025)
- Honorary Member, Dallas Dermatological Society
- Robert G. Freeman Award for Excellence in Mentoring and Leadership
- Teaching awards from the dermatology residency programs at the University of Texas Southwestern Medical Center, New York University, and Baylor College of Medicine
- Best Doctors in America
- Texas Super Doctors
- Castle Connolly Top Doctors
- Induction into the Abilene Cooper High School Hall of Fame

== Personal life ==
Cockerell comes from a multigenerational medical family with longstanding ties to Texas medicine. His father, Earl Grafton Cockerell, and grandfather, Earl Rush Cockerell, were dermatologists who practiced for many years in Abilene, Texas. His great-grandfather, Lonnie L. Cockerell, was a physician in East Texas. Members of the Cockerell family, including his great-grandfather and a cousin, were among the early graduates of Baylor College of Medicine in the early twentieth century.

He is married to Brenda West Cockerell, his high school sweetheart. They have two children.

Outside medicine, Cockerell and his family own Coquerel Family Wine Estates in Calistoga, California, a winery producing Cabernet Sauvignon, Sauvignon Blanc, Petite Sirah, Tempranillo, and other varietals.
