= Derm101 =

- Website type: Medical reference
- Available in: English, Spanish, Chinese, Portuguese
- Website: www.derm101.com
- Registration: Required
- Launched: 2002; 24 years ago
- Current status: Decommissioned

Derm101 was an online and mobile resource for physicians and healthcare professionals to learn the diagnosis and treatment of dermatologic diseases. The resource includes online textbooks, interactive quizzes, peer-reviewed open access dermatology journals, a dermatologic surgery video library, case studies, thousands of clinical photographs and photomicrographs of skin diseases, and mobile applications.

== History ==
Dr. A. Bernard Ackerman (1936–2008), a prominent figure in dermatology and dermatopathology, and Andy Zwick, his nephew and collaborator, founded Derm101 in 2002. The concept for Derm101 was envisioned and proposed to Dr. Ackerman by Zwick in 1999, while he was a senior at Harvard, and they went on to develop Derm101 together. Derm101 debuted in February 2002 at the annual meeting of the American Academy of Dermatology in New Orleans.

In February 2016, Nestlé announced its creation of Nestlé Skin Health, a conglomerate of skin health-related companies, of which Derm101 was a part of. In 2019, Nestlé Skin Health was acquired by a private equity firm EQT, a unit of the Abu Dhabi Investment Authority and PSP Investments, and rebranded as Galderma. Shortly after the sale was finalized, Galderma made the decision to decommission Derm101 which occurred on December 31, 2019.
