= Journal of Cutaneous Pathology =

Academic journal

- Discipline: Dermatopathology
- Language: English
- Edited by: Adam I. Rubin

Publication details
- History: 1974–present
- Publisher: John Wiley & Sons
- Frequency: Monthly
- Open access: Hybrid
- License: Creative Commons licenses
- Impact factor: 1.2 (2025)

Standard abbreviations
- ISO 4: J. Cutan. Pathol.

Indexing
- ISSN: 0303-6987 (print); 1600-0560 (web)

Links
- Journal homepage

The Journal of Cutaneous Pathology (JCP) is a peer-reviewed medical journal covering all aspects of dermatopathology, published by John Wiley & Sons. Established in 1974, it is the official journal of the American Society of Dermatopathology.

== Scope ==
Research areas covered include dermatology, pathology, histopathology, molecular pathology, and dermatopathology. The journal leads in research output on certain skin malignancies, including cutaneous squamous cell carcinoma and dermatofibrosarcoma protuberans, and is also a publication venue for common skin lesions such as dysplastic nevi. Article types include reviews, original research, case reports, correspondence, and perspective pieces.

== Indexing and impact factor ==
The journal is abstracted and indexed in Science Citation Index, PubMed, and MEDLINE. According to the Journal Citation Reports (2026 release), its 2025 impact factor is 1.2.
