= Telepathology =

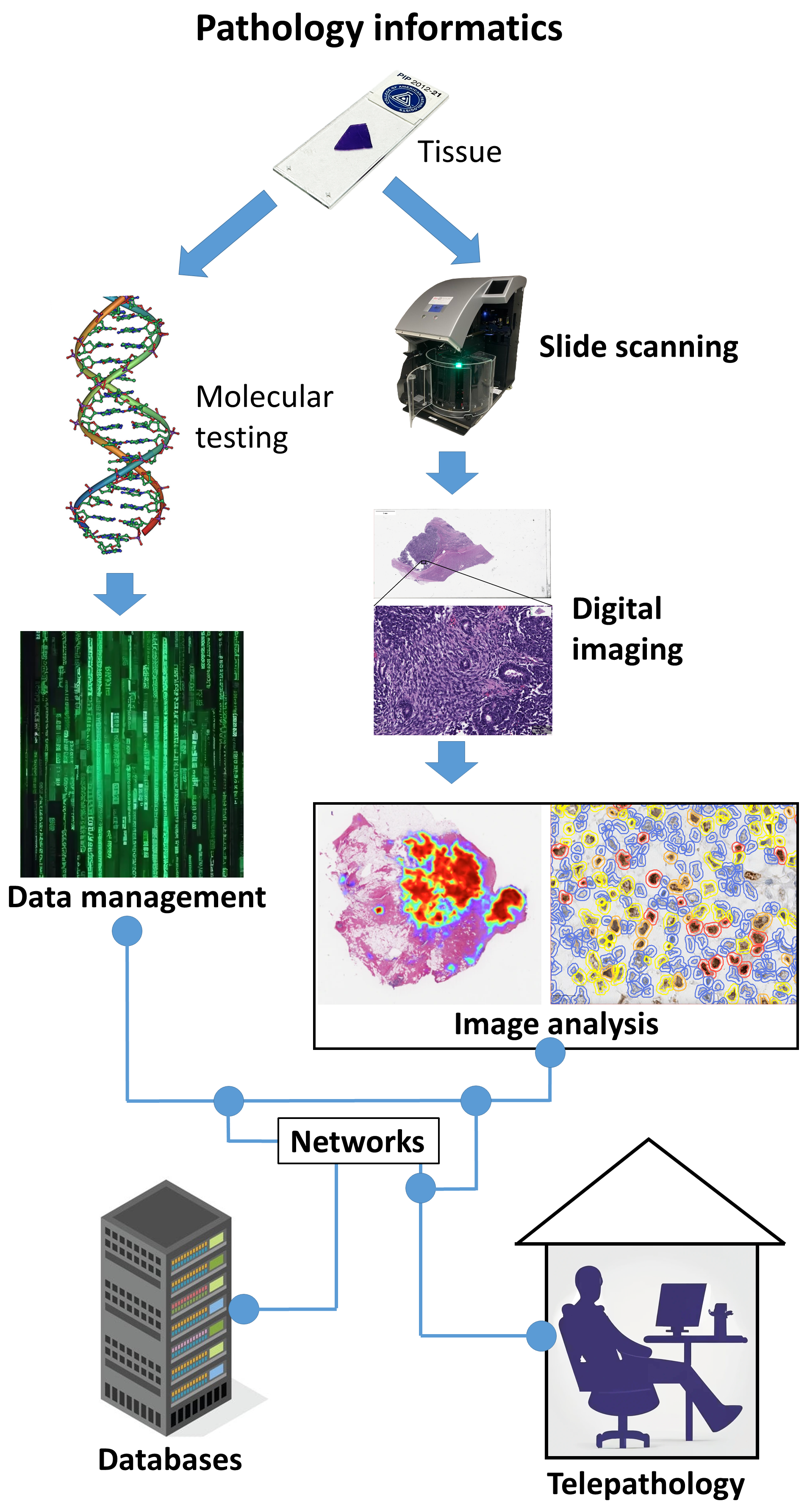
Major topics of pathology informatics, including some that underlie telepathology: slide scanning, digital imaging and networks.

Telepathology is the practice of pathology at a distance. It uses telecommunications technology to facilitate the transfer of image-rich pathology data between distant locations for the purposes of diagnosis, education, and research. Performance of telepathology requires that a pathologist selects the video images for analysis and the rendering of diagnoses. The use of "television microscopy", the forerunner of telepathology, did not require that a pathologist have physical or virtual "hands-on" involvement in the selection of microscopic fields-of-view for analysis and diagnosis.

An academic pathologist, Ronald S. Weinstein, M.D., coined the term "telepathology" in 1986. In a medical journal editorial, Weinstein outlined the actions that would be needed to create remote pathology diagnostic services. He and his collaborators published the first scientific paper on robotic telepathology. Weinstein was also granted the first U.S. patents for robotic telepathology systems and telepathology diagnostic networks. Weinstein is known to many as the "father of telepathology". In Norway, Eide and Nordrum implemented the first sustainable clinical telepathology service in 1989; this is still in operation decades later. A number of clinical telepathology services have benefited many thousands of patients in North America, Europe, and Asia.

Telepathology has been successfully used for many applications, including the rendering of histopathology tissue diagnoses at a distance. Although digital pathology imaging, including virtual microscopy, is the mode of choice for telepathology services in developed countries, analog telepathology imaging is still used for patient services in some developing countries.

== Types of systems ==
Telepathology systems are divided into three major types: static image-based systems, real-time systems, and virtual slide systems.

Static image systems have the benefit of being the most reasonably priced and usable systems. They have the significant drawback in only being able to capture a selected subset of microscopic fields for off-site evaluation.

Real-time robotic microscopy systems and virtual slides allow a consultant pathologist the opportunity to evaluate histopathology slides in their entirety, from a distance. With real-time systems, the consultant actively operates a robotically controlled motorized microscope located at a distant site—changing focus, illumination, magnification, and field of view—at will. Either an analog video camera or a digital video camera can be used for robotic microscopy. Another form of real-time microscopy involves utilizing a high resolution video camera mounted on a path lab microscope to send live digital video of a slide to a large computer monitor at the pathologist's remote location via encrypted store-and-forward software. An echo-cancelling microphone at each end of the video conference allows the pathologist to communicate with the person moving the slide under the microscope.

Virtual slide systems utilize automated digital slide scanners that create a digital image file of an entire glass slide (whole slide image). This file is stored on a computer server and can be navigated at a distance, over the Internet, using a browser. Digital imaging is required for virtual microscopy.

While real-time and virtual slide systems offer higher diagnostic accuracy when compared with static-image telepathology, there are drawbacks to each. Real-time systems perform best on local area networks (LANs), but performance may suffer if employed during periods of high network traffic or using the Internet proper as a backbone. Expense is an issue with real-time systems and virtual slide systems as they can be costly. Virtual slide telepathology is emerging as the technology of choice for telepathology services. However, high throughput virtual slide scanners (those producing one virtual slide or more per minute) are currently expensive. Also, virtual slide digital files are relatively large, often exceeding one gigabyte in size. Storing and simultaneously retrieving large numbers of telepathology whole-slide image files can be cumbersome, introducing their own workflow challenges in the clinical laboratory.

Types of Telepathology Platform: Telepathology platforms that have adopted whole slide imaging enables remote viewing to aid pathologist in following ways: By remote sharing and secondly by uploading images for expert consultations.

== Uses and benefits ==
Telepathology is currently being used for a wide spectrum of clinical applications including diagnosing of frozen section specimens, primary histopathology diagnoses, second opinion diagnoses, subspecialty pathology expert diagnoses, investigative and regulated preclinical toxicology studies, education, competency assessment, and research. Benefits of telepathology include providing immediate access to off-site pathologists for rapid frozen section diagnoses. Another benefit can be gaining direct access to subspecialty pathologists such as a renal pathologist, a neuropathologist, or a dermatopathologist, for immediate consultations.

== Services by country ==
=== Canada ===
Canada Health Infoway is the organization responsible for the implementation of telepathology in Canada. Canada Health Infoway is a federal non-profit which provides funding for improving digital health infrastructure.

Canada Health Infoway has targeted funding of $1.2 million CAD to the Telepathology Solution for the province of British Columbia. The system is designed to connect all pathologists within the province. The long-term expectations are improvement to patient care and safety through access to pathology expertise, improved timeliness of results and quality of service.

In Ontario, the University Health Network (UHN) hospitals are the primary drivers of the development of telepathology. The three northern Ontario communities of Timmins, Sault Ste. Marie and Kapuskasing have several community hospitals virtually linked to UHN pathologists via the Internet 24 hours a day.

== See also ==
- Anatomical pathology
- Cytopathology
- Digital pathology
- Juan Rosai, a surgical pathology professor working with telepathology
- Medical laboratory
- Microscopy
- Ronald S. Weinstein, an early innovator in telepathology
- Virtual microscope
- Virtual slide
