= Ronald S. Weinstein =

American pathologist (1938–2021)

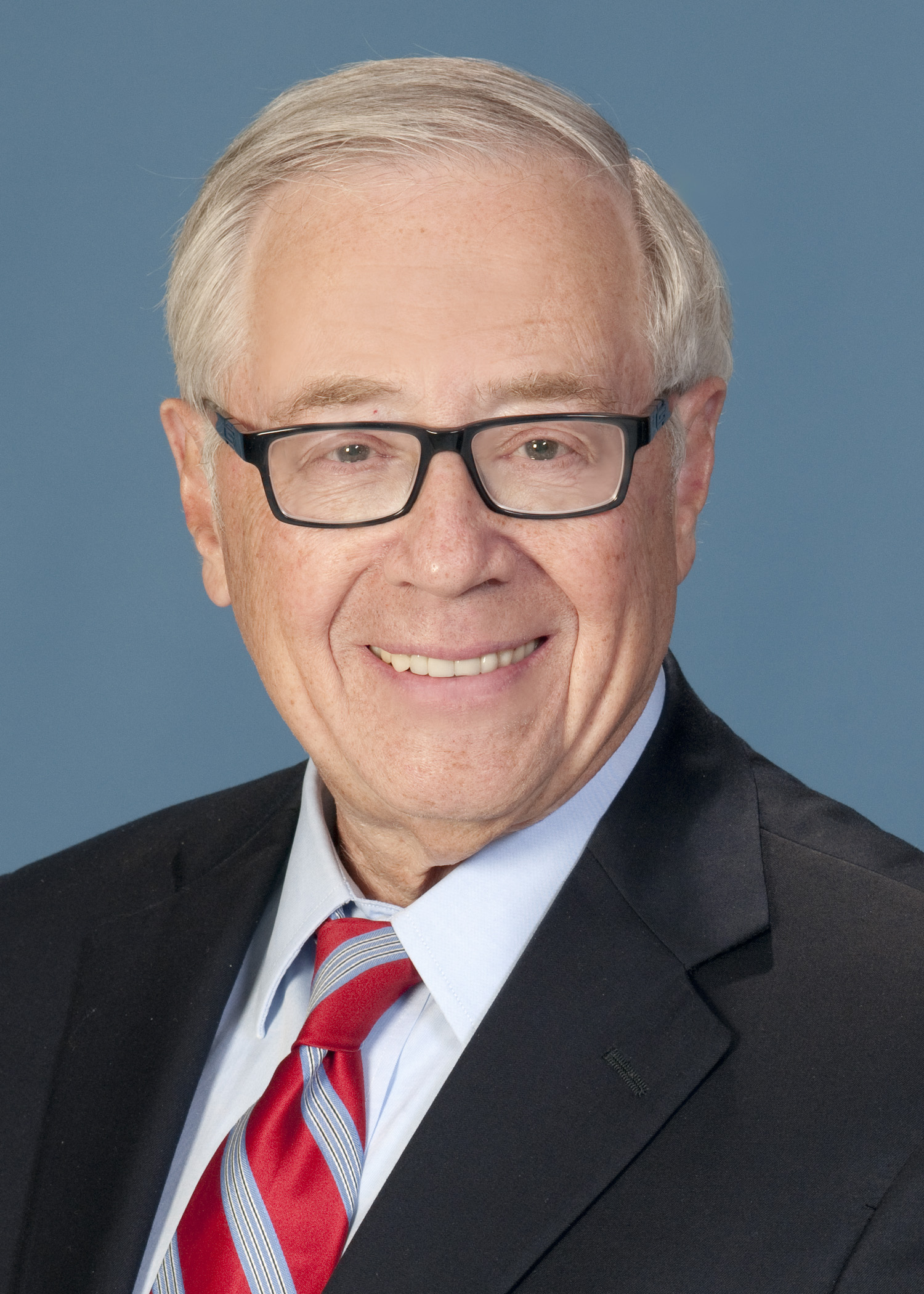
- Born: November 20, 1938; Schenectady, New York
- Died: December 3, 2021 (aged 83)
- Education: Union College (BS); Tufts Medical School (MD)
- Known for: Telepathology, Urinary Bladder Cancer, Science Education
- Scientific career
- Fields: Cancer biology, Multi-drug resistance
- Workplaces: University of Arizona College of Medicine; Rush Medical College

Ronald S. Weinstein (November 20, 1938 – December 3, 2021) was an American pathologist. He was a professor at the University of Arizona College of Medicine-Tucson. Weinstein served for 32 years as an academic pathology department chair, in Chicago, Illinois and then Tucson, Arizona, while also serving as a serial entrepreneur engaged in university technology transfer.

He is past president of six medical organizations, including the United States and Canadian Academy of Pathology and the International Society for Urological Pathology, which he co-founded. He is a cancer researcher, an educator, and an inventor.

== Early life and education ==
Weinstein was born on November 20, 1938, in Schenectady, New York. He completed his undergraduate studies at Union College in Schenectady. In college, he was a Ford Foundation-funded Congressional Intern in Washington, D.C., in the office of US Representative Samuel S. Stratton, and studied governmental affairs. His primary focus remained medical science research. After graduation from Union College, Weinstein spent three summers working as a chemist at Woods Hole Marine Biological Laboratory. Weinstein obtained his M.D. degree from Tufts Medical School in Boston in 1965. In medical school, he had been a Massachusetts General Hospital (MGH) post-sophomore research fellow and had done research on high-resolution freeze-fracture electron microscopy with Stanley Bullivant, PhD, a biophysicist and Harvard faculty member. As an MGH pathology resident, he co-authored research papers on intercellular junctions, cancer cell, and red cell membranes.

== Career ==
During the Vietnam War, he served as a United States Air Force Major at the Aerospace Medical Research Laboratory, Wright-Patterson Air Force Base, in Dayton, Ohio, where he was involved in toxicology research, and participated in computer science courses in computer programming and system design at the Air Force Institute of Technology on the same campus. He researched the potential sources of toxic chronic chemical injury, from trace amounts of rocket propellants and oxidizers, to airmen working in Titan missile silo environments. From 1972 to 1975, he was Professor of Pathology at Tufts University School of Medicine. He continued his research on normal cell membranes and cancer cell membranes and initiated research on animal models for urinary bladder cancer. In 1975, Weinstein was named the Harriet Blair Borland Professor and chairman of pathology at Rush Medical College in Chicago. Weinstein participated in National Cancer Institute (NCI) funded cancer clinical trials as director of the National Bladder Cancer Group's Central Pathology Laboratory (1982–1990), which qualified patients for inclusion in urinary bladder cancer clinical trials. In addition, he was Founding Director of the NCI-funded National Urinary Bladder Flow Cytometry Network which established clinical flow cytometry laboratory procedures and standards (1985–1990). In 1990, Weinstein was named Professor and Chair of Pathology at The University of Arizona's College of Medicine. He studied cancer multi-drug resistance at the Arizona Cancer Center. He also holds academic appointments in the university's College of Pharmacy and its Mel and Enid Zuckerman College of Public Health.

In 1988–89, Weinstein was president of the United States and Canadian Academy of Pathology. In 1995–1996, he was president of the International Society for Urological Pathology. In 2003–04, he was president of the American Telemedicine Association. In 2010–2011, he was president of the Association for Pathology Informatics.

== Development of telepathology and telemedicine ==
While a department chair at Rush Medical College in Chicago, Weinstein carried out the first public demonstration of satellite-enabled robotic telepathology, between El Paso, TX. and Washington, DC, in 1986. In 1993, Weinstein patented telepathology systems and telepathology diagnostic networks. He established an international telepathology service network linking the United States, Mexico and China. Weinstein has been referred to as the “father of telepathology” in a 2011 journal article written by a student and a faculty member from an Indian medical school. Weinstein received the Association of Pathology Informatics’ Lifetime Achievement Award.

In 1996, he became Founding Director of the Arizona Telemedicine Program (ATP), which he co-founded with Arizona State Representative Robert "Bob" Burns. The ATP links 160 sites in 70 communities by broadband telecommunications and has provided telemedicine services for 1.4 million cases in 61 subspecialties of medicine. He became executive director of the Institute for Advanced Telemedicine and Telehealth (T-Health Institute), a Phoenix division of the ATP, in 2004.

The ATP includes: the Tucson-based Warren Street Clinic, a dual-purpose clinical education facility which provides real-time tele-medicine specialty services across the network and hands-on training for participants in the ATP's regularly scheduled full day telemedicine courses; the T-Health Amphitheater, a video conferencing center located at the T-Health Institute on the Phoenix Biomedical Campus is in downtown Phoenix; and the federally-funded Southwest Telehealth Resource Center, which provides technical support and staff training for telehealth programs in the southwestern United States.

== Research and development ==
Technology innovations, classifications, and validations

Weinstein has had a career-long interest in the development of medical science research technologies including: freeze-fracture electron microscopy; urinary bladder flow cytometry; image analysis; holographic microscopy; robotic telepathology; quantitative immunohistochemistry; array light microscopy; and digital pathology.

Cancer research

Weinstein studied mechanisms of carcinogenesis, pre-cancer development, and cancer invasion and metastasis. He studied cell membrane properties in normal epithelium, pre-cancers and cancers.

Medical science education reform

To encourage the democratization of medical science knowledge, Weinstein developed a series of class-room courses on “mechanisms of diseases” that have been utilized in middle schools, high schools, and universities.

Global health

Weinstein was involved in the creation and evaluation of multi-national telemedicine and telepathology programs. In 1981–1983, he was International Councilor of the International Academy of Pathology. In 1998–1999, he was president of the International Council of Societies of Pathology, a World Health Organization registered entity. Weinstein was an advisor on telemedicine for the Minister of Health in Mexico, China, and Panama. He was a frequent lecturer at international medical conferences.

Publications

Weinstein has published over 300 articles in peer reviewed scientific and pathology journals, 57 book chapters, and 11 books. These have been cited over 11,000 times in the science literature.

== Honors and awards ==
Weinstein is president emeritus of the American Telemedicine Association. In 2013, he was inducted into the United States Distance Learning Association "Hall-of-Fame". The T-Health Amphitheater, in Phoenix, AZ, a "Classroom-of-the-Future" co-designed by Weinstein, received the 21st Century Achievement Award, Education and Academia category, from the International Computer World Honors program.

== Involvement in business ==
In 1982, Weinstein, and his sister and business partner, Beth Newburger, co-founded OWLCAT, Inc., an early entrant in the IBM computer-based, S.A.T. examination preparation course business. Two years later, OWLCAT, Inc. was acquired by Digital Research, Inc. (DRI). DRI successfully marketed the OWLCAT education software products.

In 1985, Weinstein and Newburger co-founded Corabi International Telemetrics, Inc. Corabi equipped several US Department of Veterans Affairs Medical Centers with robotic telepathology systems. These were used for proof-of-concept studies validating telepathology for clinical use. In 2001, Weinstein co-founded DMetrix, Inc., a spin-out company of The University of Arizona's College of Optical Sciences. DMetrix, Inc. was awarded 29 US Patents on its DX-40 ultra-rapid array microscope digital slide scanner.

For his work in university technology transfer, he received the University of Arizona's "2012 Technology Innovator-of-the-Year" Award.

== Personal life ==
In 1964, Weinstein married the former Mary Corabi; they met while they were both working at Woods Hole. They have two grown children and two grandsons. Dr. Weinstein died in December 2021 of heart failure.
