= International Society of Dermatopathology =

Professional medical organization

The International Society of Dermatopathology is a non-profit, international society for the discipline of dermatopathology which was founded in 1979. It is based in Half Moon Bay, California, US.

It publishes a peer-reviewed journal, The American Journal of Dermatopathology (AJDP). It was founded by Helmut Kerl, MD; Gérald E. Piérard, MD; Jorge Sánchez, MD; and the late A. Bernard Ackerman, MD.
