= Susan Taylor =

Susan Taylor may refer to:

- Susan L. Taylor (born 1946), American journalist and former editor-in-chief of Essence magazine
- Susan S. Taylor (born 1942), American biochemist
- Susan C. Taylor(born 1957), American dermatologist
- Sue Taylor, British-Australian journalist and television producer
- Taylor Pie a.k.a. Susan Taylor (born 1947), American folk singer
- Susie King Taylor (1848–1912), American nurse, educator, and memoirist
- Susan Taylor (runner) (born 1977), American middle-distance runner, winner of the 2000 1500 meters at the NCAA Division I Outdoor Track and Field Championships
