= Dermaordinology =

Medical field

Dermaordinology (from Ancient Greek δέρμα (derma) “skin”, Latin ordināre, “to put in order” and Ancient Greek λόγος, “knowledge/study”) is a specialised field in cosmetics and medicine aimed at finding the optimal permanent solution to superficial skin defects, such as hypertrichosis, hirsutism, couperosis, acne, milia and fibromata. Combining findings from endocrinology and dermatology, dermaordinology serves as the basis for the development of innovative micro-surgical methods to safely and painlessly remove these defects without damaging the surrounding skin tissue.
