= Suction blister =

Dermatologic procedure for chronic wounds

- Specialty: Dermatology

Suction blistering is a technique used in dermatology to treat chronic wounds, such as non-healing leg ulcers. When a wound is not healing properly, an autologous skin graft is the best option, to prevent rejection of the tissue. Since autologous transplantation cannot always be performed, a substitute has to be used, such as cultured skin. However, this technique is costly and time-consuming. Other uses of suction blisters are to provide transplantation donor tissue for vitiligo research. Suction blisters are often used in tissue serum research in the pharmaceutical and cosmetic research fields. Many research citations are published worldwide that support these uses.

== Method ==
During suction blistering, the lamina lucida of the skin is cleaved from the underlying layers. This separates the epidermis from the dermis. With the use of small vacuum pumps, little fluid-filled blisters are created, typically on the abdomen. Blisters are usually formed within 2 to 3 hours. A well-recognized instrument, the Negative Pressure Instrument, from Electronic Diversities, Finksburg MD, US, is used with heated chambers to produce various-sized suction blisters with less time and improved success.

The blisters are then cut, emptied and the loose skin is transferred side by side to the non-healing wound.

Subsequently, the donor-site is treated with antiseptic drugs and covered with bandages. The acceptor-site is treated with non-adherent bandages, to prevent the skin graft from sticking to the bandages.

== Advantages ==
- No anaesthesia is needed during the procedure
- Easy to perform
- Low chance of rejection
- Almost always available
