= American Osteopathic Board of Dermatology =

- Abbreviation: AOBD
- Formation: 1945
- Type: Professional
- Headquarters: Chicago, IL
- Chairman: Joan Tamburro, DO
- Vice Chairman: Jonathan D Richey, DO, MHA, FAOCD
- Website: aobd.org

The American Osteopathic Board of Dermatology (AOBD) is an organization that provides board certification to qualified Doctors of Osteopathic Medicine (D.O.) who specialize in the medical and surgical treatment of disorders of the skin (dermatologists). The board is one of 18 medical specialty certifying boards of the American Osteopathic Association Bureau of Osteopathic Specialists approved by the American Osteopathic Association (AOA).

== History ==
AOBD was established in 1945. It is one of two certifying boards for dermatologists in the United States; the other is the American Board of Dermatology, a member board of the American Board of Medical Specialties. As of 2023, 687 osteopathic physicians held active certification with the AOBD. In addition to the fellows of the American Board of Dermatology, board-certified osteopathic dermatologists are eligible for admission into the American Society for Mohs Surgery.

== Board certification ==
Initial certification is available to osteopathic dermatologists who have completed an AOA-approved residency in dermatology and clinical and written exams. Diplomates of the American Osteopathic Board of Dermatology are required to renew their certification every ten years to maintain their board-certified status.

== Subspecialties ==
The AOBD also oversees examinations for osteopathic dermatologists seeking to subspecialize in Mohs micrographic surgery, pediatric dermatology, and dermatopathology.

== See also ==
- Dermatology
- American Board of Dermatology
