= Journal of the American Academy of Dermatology =

- Discipline: Dermatology
- Language: English
- Edited by: Dirk Elston

Publication details
- History: 1979-present
- Publisher: Elsevier on behalf of the American Academy of Dermatology
- Frequency: Monthly
- Impact factor: 11.527 (2020)

Standard abbreviations
- ISO 4: J. Am. Acad. Dermatol.

Indexing
- CODEN: JAADDB
- ISSN: 0190-9622
- OCLC no.: 4781711

Links
- Journal homepage; Online access; Archive

The Journal of the American Academy of Dermatology, sometimes abbreviated JAAD, is a monthly peer-reviewed medical journal covering dermatology. It was established in 1979 and is published by Elsevier on behalf of the American Academy of Dermatology, of which it is the official journal. The editor-in-chief is Dirk Elston (Medical University of South Carolina). According to the Journal Citation Reports, the journal has a 2017 impact factor of 6.898.

JAAD has a companion journal focusing on case reports called JAAD Case Reports.
