= Susan C. Taylor =

American dermatologist

Susan Charlene Taylor (born October 7, 1957) is an American dermatologist. She is the Bernett L. Johnson, Jr., M.D. Professor and the vice chair of Diversity, Equity, and Inclusion in the department of dermatology at the Perelman School of Medicine at the University of Pennsylvania. She is the 84th president of the American Academy of Dermatology, the first African-American in the role.

Taylor was born on October 7, 1957, in Philadelphia, Pennsylvania. She was raised by a single mother with her younger sister. She graduated from Friends Select School. In 1979, Taylor earned a B.A. in biology, magna cum laude, from the University of Pennsylvania. She completed a M.D. at Harvard Medical School in 1983.
