= Virtual slide =

A virtual slide is created when glass slides are digitally scanned in their entirety to provide a high resolution digital image using a digital scanning system for the purpose of medical digital image analysis. Digital slides can be retrieved from a storage system, and viewed on a computer screen, by running image management software on a standard web browser, and assessed in exactly the same way as on a microscope. Digital slides can be used as an alternative to traditional viewing for the purpose of teleconsultation.

The main virtual slide collection is the "Juan Rosai's collection of surgical pathology seminars", curated by USCAP.
