= Microbiological Research =

- Discipline: Microbiology
- Language: English
- Edited by: Gerardo Puopolo and Xiaohui Zhou

Publication details
- History: 1896–present
- Publisher: Elsevier (Netherlands)
- Frequency: Monthly
- Open access: Delayed open access
- Impact factor: 8.5 (2025)

Standard abbreviations
- ISO 4: Microbiol. Res.

Indexing
- ISSN: 0944-5013

Links
- Journal homepage; Online access

Microbiological Research is a peer-reviewed scientific journal established in 1896 and published by Elsevier. It publishes original research articles and reviews covering fundamental and applied aspects of microbiology, including microbial biology, genetics, physiology, ecology, and biotechnology. According to the 2026 edition of Journal Citation Reports, the journal has a 2025 impact factor of 8.5.

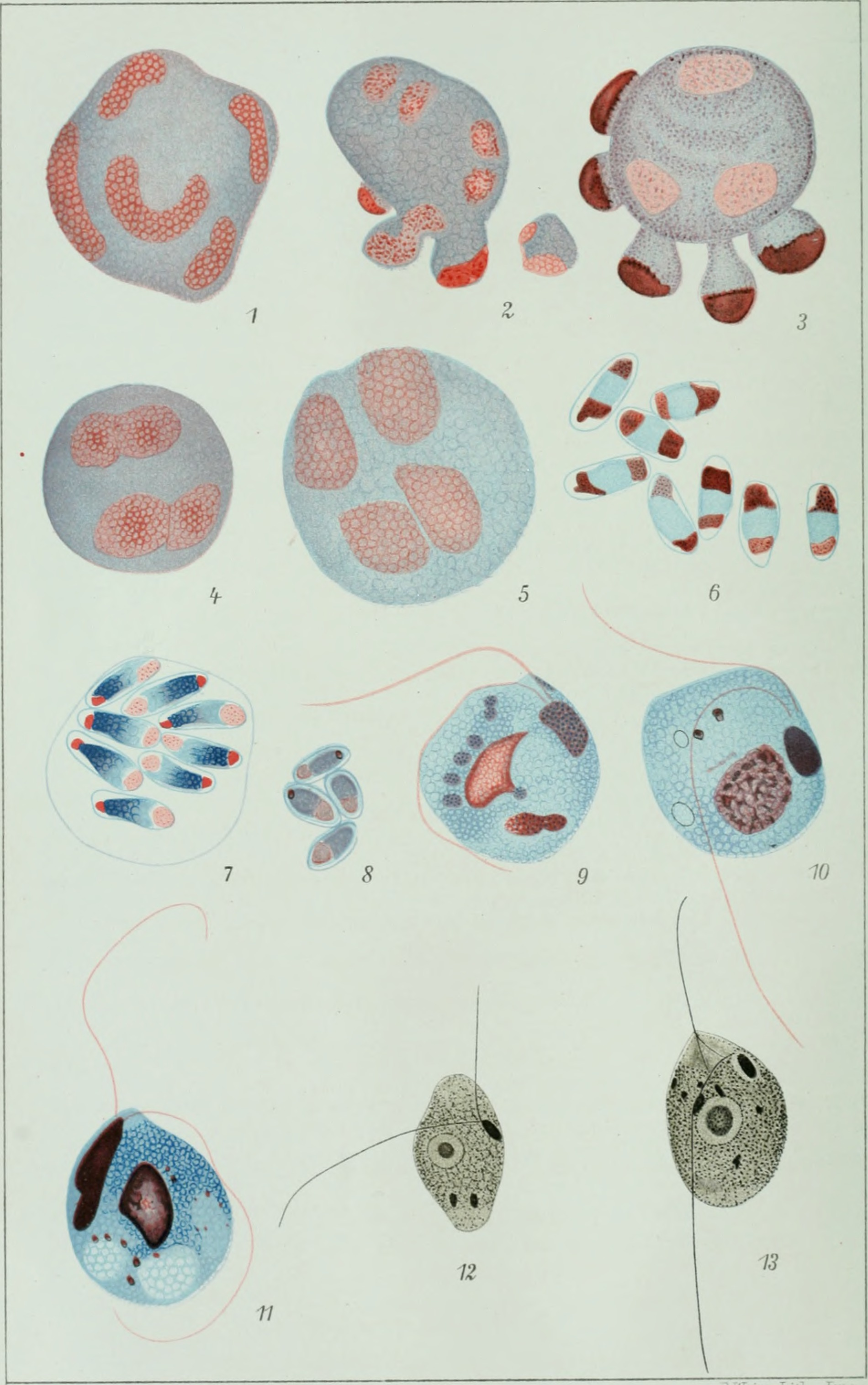
Illustrations in Microbiological Research (1912)

The journal covers research on bacteria, archaea, fungi, protozoa, and other microorganisms, as well as their interactions with hosts and the environment. Its subject areas include molecular and cellular microbiology, microbial genetics, metabolism and physiology, signal transduction, host–pathogen interactions, microbial ecology, and microbial biotechnology. Additional areas of coverage include microbiomes and microbial communities, antimicrobial resistance, synthetic biology, phytopathology, and systems, computational, and evolutionary microbiology.

The journal was originally published by Gustav Fischer Verlag. It was originally titled Centralblatt für Bakteriologie, Parasitenkunde und Infektionskrankheiten, then as the Zentralblatt für Bakteriologie, Parasitenkunde, Infektionskrankheiten und Hygiene until volume 136 (1981), and then as the Zentralblatt für Mikrobiologie from volumes 137 (1982) to 148 (1993). It was renamed Microbiological Research in 1993. Formerly published in German, it is now an English-language journal.
