= American Board of Dermatology =

Professional medical certification association

The American Board of Dermatology (ABD), located in Newton, Massachusetts, United States, certifies physicians in dermatology, dermatopathology, and pediatric dermatology. Board-certified physicians are known as diplomates. Since its inception in 1932, the ABD has certified over 15,000 physicians. The ABD was one of the original four sponsoring organizations of the American Board of Medical Specialties (ABMS). Dermatologists possess expertise in all aspects of healthy and diseased skin through basic scientific research and clinical care. In addition to the wide range of medical diseases, dermatologists have practices devoted to skin surgery (including aesthetic procedures), care of children with skin disease, immunologic diseases of the skin and pathology of the skin. Dermatologists play an important role in the maintenance of the general public health in educating people about sun avoidance, sun protection and the signs of skin cancer.

== History ==
The American Board of Dermatology and Syphilology was incorporated in 1932 in order to set standards in the field of dermatology and to assure the adequate training and experience of those physicians wishing to call themselves dermatologists. Evaluation of the skin was instrumental in the diagnosis of syphilis before serologic studies became available. In 1955, the name was changed to the American Board of Dermatology.

The ABD originally had nine directors but has expanded to 17, reflecting the increasing complexity of the field and in response to the public demand for physician accountability in matters of quality assurance. A major new role for the ABD lies in the rigorous maintenance of certification program that enrolls physicians in a lifelong certification process encompassing a variety of quality measures and outcomes.

== Certification and maintenance of certification ==
Initial certification is attained after post-graduate medical education, and the notation "board-certified" attests to the physician's successful mastery of a body of knowledge and set of skills. The ABMS and its affiliated boards strive for the highest standards to assure the public that a board-certified physician is current in medical knowledge and practices medicine ethically.

To assure ongoing competence, maintenance of certification was enacted. As of 2006, all dermatologists successful in initial certification enter MOC. Through periodic self-assessment of medical knowledge, communication skills, patient safety and practice quality measures, physicians in MOC continue to document the high standards they have achieved.

Maintenance of Certification has four elements:

- Professional standing – physicians must document that their state licenses are active and unrestricted.
- Lifelong learning and self-assessment – physicians participate in a minimum amount of continuing medical education and self-assessment programs.
- Cognitive expertise – physicians must take and pass a proctored and secure examination at least once every ten years.
- Performance in practice evaluation – physicians study their own practice patterns against national measures to assure high quality.

== See also ==
- American Osteopathic Board of Dermatology
- American Board of Medical Specialties
