= American Academy of Dermatology =

Non-profit professional organization

- Abbreviation: AAD
- Predecessor: American Academy of Dermatology and Syphilology
- Formation: 1938
- Type: Professional
- Tax ID no.: 41-0793046
- Legal status: 501(c)(3)
- Purpose: Education
- Headquarters: Rosemont, Illinois
- President: Susan C. Taylor
- Executive Director: Elizabeth K. Usher, MBA
- Revenue: $38,199,006 (2022)
- Expenses: $45,090,931 (2022)
- Website: www.aad.org

The American Academy of Dermatology (AAD) is a non-profit professional organization of dermatologists in the United States and Canada, based in Rosemont, Illinois, near Chicago. It was founded in 1938 and has more than 21,000 members. The academy grants fellowships and associate memberships, as well as fellowships for nonresidents of the United States or Canada. Since 1979, the AAD also publishes a monthly medical journal, the Journal of the American Academy of Dermatology.

To become a Fellow of the American Academy of Dermatology (FAAD), a physician must be a resident of the United States of America or Canada and certified by the American Board of Dermatology or in dermatology by the Royal College of Physicians and Surgeons of Canada.

To become an associate member, a physician must have three years of experience in practice or as a teacher or graduate student of dermatology and must have had training that qualifies for examination by the American Board of Dermatology or the Royal College of Physicians and Surgeons of Canada.

== History ==
In 1938, the American Academy of Dermatology and Syphilology was founded at an organizational meeting at the Statler Hotel in Detroit, Michigan.

During the mid-20th century, effective treatment for syphilis and changing patterns of clinical practice reduced the role of syphilology within dermatology, and the Academy ultimately dropped “and Syphilology” from its name in 1961. By the 2020s, the Academy described itself as having a membership of more than 21,000 physicians worldwide and focused on professional education, clinical practice standards, research, advocacy, and patient-care initiatives in dermatology.

In 1979, the Academy began publishing its official journal, the Journal of the American Academy of Dermatology. In the 2010s, the Academy expanded data and quality-improvement infrastructure in the specialty; for example, it launched the DataDerm clinical data registry in 2016.

== Sulzberger Institute Committee ==
The Sulzberger Institute for Dermatologic Education was a grant-giving organization that funds research technology of education.

== Political action committee ==
The American Academy of Dermatology Political Action Committee (SKINPAC) donated nearly $2.0 million to both Democratic and Republican office-seekers during the 2024 election cycle. The PAC raised more than $2.04 million from 1,885 donors, who gave more than $200 each, with 149 donors, mostly dermatologists, making the maximum donation allowed by law, $5,000 each.

SKINPAC gave:

- $575,500 to House Democrats
- $544,000 to House Republicans
- $70,000 to Senate Democrats
- $23,500 to Senate Republicans
- $301,500 to Democratic PACs
- $389,000 to Republican PACs.

Donations in the 2024 cycle were up (38.69%) from the 2022 cycle.
