= Pathology =

Study of disease

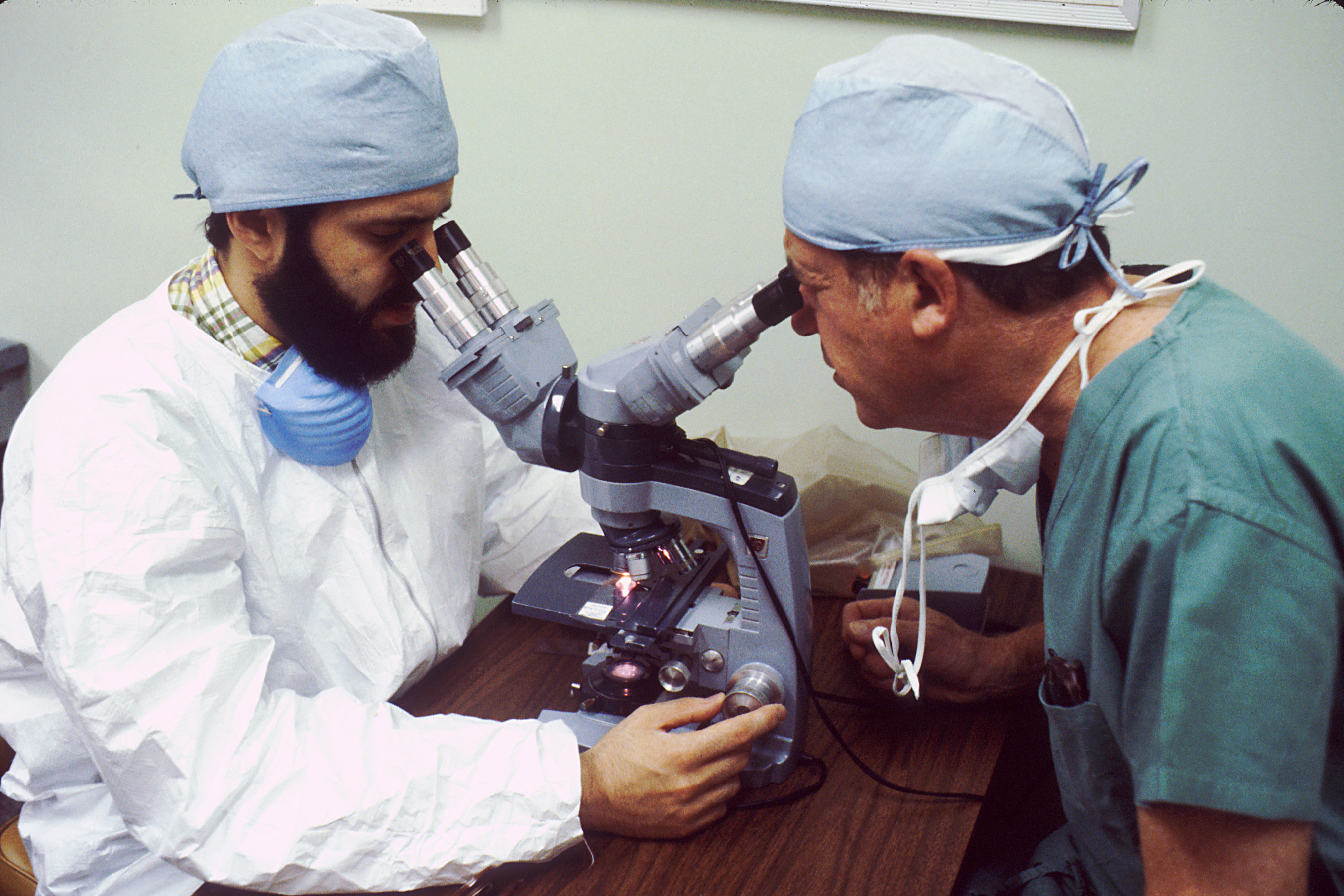
- A pathologist examines a tissue section for evidence of cancerous cells while a surgeon observes.
- Focus: Disease
- Subdivisions: Anatomical pathology, clinical pathology, dermatopathology, forensic pathology, hematopathology, histopathology, molecular pathology, surgical pathology
- Significant diseases: All infectious and organic diseases and physiological disorders
- Significant tests: All medical diagnostic tests, in particular biopsy, blood analysis, dissection, and other applications of medical microscopy
- Specialist: Pathologist
- Glossary: Glossary of medicine

Pathologist
Occupation
- Names: Physician; Surgeon
- Occupation type: Specialty
- Activity sectors: Medicine, Surgery

Description
- Education required: Doctor of Medicine (M.D.); Doctor of Osteopathic medicine (D.O.); Doctor of Veterinary Medicine (D.V.M); Bachelor of Medicine, Bachelor of Surgery (M.B.B.S./M.B.Ch.B.)
- Fields of employment: Hospitals, Clinics

Pathology is the study of disease. The word pathology also refers to the study of disease in general, incorporating a wide range of biology research fields and medical practices. However, when used in the context of modern medical treatment, the term is often used in a narrower fashion to refer to processes and tests that fall within the contemporary medical field of "general pathology", an area that includes a number of distinct but inter-related medical specialties that diagnose disease, mostly through analysis of tissue and human cell samples. Pathology is a significant field in modern medical diagnosis and medical research. A physician practicing pathology is called a pathologist.

As a field of general inquiry and research, pathology addresses components of disease: cause, mechanisms of development (pathogenesis), structural alterations of cells (morphologic changes), and the consequences of changes (clinical manifestations). In common medical practice, general pathology is mostly concerned with analyzing known clinical abnormalities that are markers or precursors for both infectious and non-infectious disease, and is conducted by experts in one of two major specialties, anatomical pathology and clinical pathology. Further divisions in specialty exist on the basis of the involved sample types (comparing, for example, cytopathology, hematopathology, and histopathology), organs (as in renal pathology), and physiological systems (oral pathology), as well as on the basis of the focus of the examination (as with forensic pathology).

Idiomatically, "a pathology" may also refer to the predicted or actual progression of particular diseases (as in the statement "the many different forms of cancer have diverse pathologies" in which case a more precise choice of word would be "pathophysiologies"). The suffix -pathy is sometimes used to indicate a state of disease in cases of both physical ailment (as in cardiomyopathy) and psychological conditions (such as psychopathy).

== Etymology ==
The Latin term pathology derives from the Ancient Greek roots pathos (πάθος), meaning "experience" or "suffering", and -logia (-λογία), meaning "study of". The term is of early 16th-century origin, and became increasingly popularized after the 1530s.

== History ==
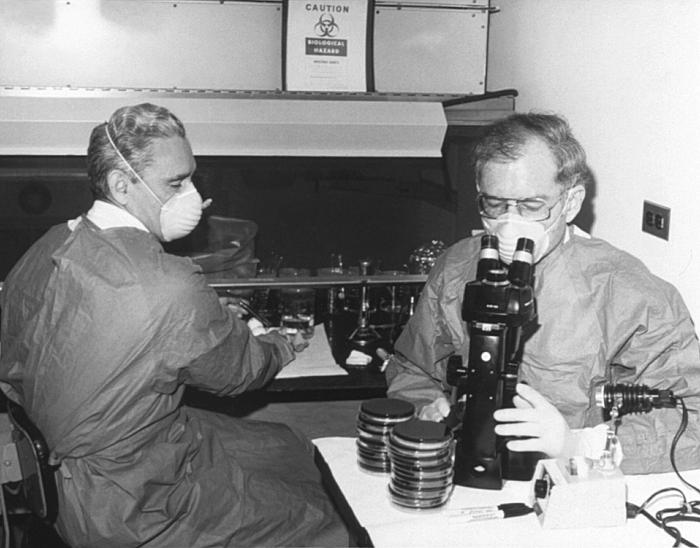
The advent of the microscope was one of the major developments in the history of pathology. Here researchers at the Centers for Disease Control in 1978 examine cultures containing Legionella pneumophila, the pathogen responsible for Legionnaires' disease.

The study of pathology, including the detailed examination of the body, dissection and inquiry into specific maladies, dates back to antiquity. Rudimentary understanding of many conditions was present in most early societies and is attested to in the records of the earliest historical societies, including those of the Middle East, India, and China. By the Hellenic period of ancient Greece, a concerted causal study of disease was underway (see Medicine in ancient Greece), with many notable early physicians (such as Hippocrates, for whom the modern Hippocratic Oath is named) having developed methods of diagnosis and prognosis for a number of diseases. The medical practices of the Romans and those of the Byzantines continued from these Greek roots, but, as with many areas of scientific inquiry, growth in understanding of medicine stagnated somewhat after the Classical Era, but continued to slowly develop throughout numerous cultures. Notably, many advances were made in the medieval era of Islam (see Medicine in medieval Islam), during which numerous texts of complex pathologies were developed, also based on the Greek tradition. Even so, growth in complex understanding of disease mostly languished until knowledge and experimentation again began to proliferate in the Renaissance, Enlightenment, and Baroque eras, following the resurgence of the empirical method at new centers of scholarship. By the 17th century, the study of rudimentary microscopy was underway and examination of tissues had led British Royal Society member Robert Hooke to coin the word "cell", setting the stage for later germ theory.

Modern pathology began to develop as a distinct field of inquiry during the 19th Century through natural philosophers and physicians that studied disease and the informal study of what they termed "pathological anatomy" or "morbid anatomy". However, pathology as a formal area of specialty was not fully developed until the late 19th and early 20th centuries, with the advent of detailed study of microbiology. In the 19th century, physicians had begun to understand that disease-causing pathogens, or "germs" (a catch-all for disease-causing, or 'pathogenic', microbes, such as bacteria, viruses, fungi, amoebae, molds, protists, and prions) existed and were capable of reproduction and multiplication, replacing earlier beliefs in humors or even spiritual agents, that had dominated for much of the previous 1,500 years in European medicine. With the new understanding of causative agents, physicians began to compare the characteristics of one germ's symptoms as they developed within an affected individual to another germ's characteristics and symptoms. This approach led to the foundational understanding that diseases are able to replicate themselves, and that they can have many profound and varied effects on the human host. To determine causes of diseases, medical experts used the most common and widely accepted assumptions or symptoms of their times, a general principle of approach that persists in modern medicine.

Modern medicine was particularly advanced by further developments of the microscope to analyze tissues, to which Rudolf Virchow gave a significant contribution, leading to a slew of research developments. By the late 1920s to early 1930s pathology was deemed a medical specialty. Combined with developments in the understanding of general physiology, by the beginning of the 20th century, the study of pathology had begun to split into a number of distinct fields, resulting in the development of a large number of modern specialties within pathology and related disciplines of diagnostic medicine.

== General pathology ==
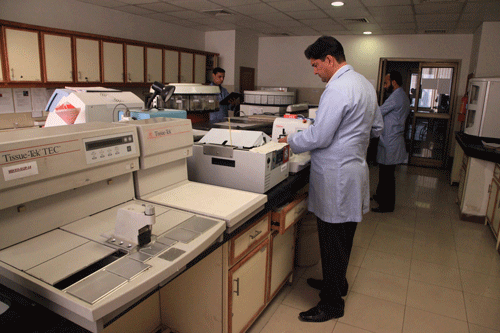
A modern pathology lab at the Services Institute of Medical Sciences

The modern practice of pathology is divided into a number of subdisciplines within the distinct but deeply interconnected aims of biological research and medical practice. Biomedical research into disease incorporates the work of a vast variety of life science specialists, whereas, in most parts of the world, to be licensed to practice pathology as a medical specialty, one has to complete medical school and secure a license to practice medicine. Structurally, the study of disease is divided into many different fields that study or diagnose markers for disease using methods and technologies particular to specific scales, organs, and tissue types.

=== Anatomical pathology ===
Anatomical pathology (Commonwealth) or anatomic pathology (United States) is a medical specialty that is concerned with the diagnosis of disease based on the gross, microscopic, chemical, immunologic and molecular examination of organs, tissues, and whole bodies (as in a general examination or an autopsy). Anatomical pathology is itself divided into subfields, the main divisions being surgical pathology, cytopathology, and forensic pathology. Anatomical pathology is one of two main divisions of the medical practice of pathology, the other being clinical pathology, the diagnosis of disease through the laboratory analysis of bodily fluids and tissues. Sometimes, pathologists practice both anatomical and clinical pathology, a combination known as general pathology.

==== Cytopathology ====
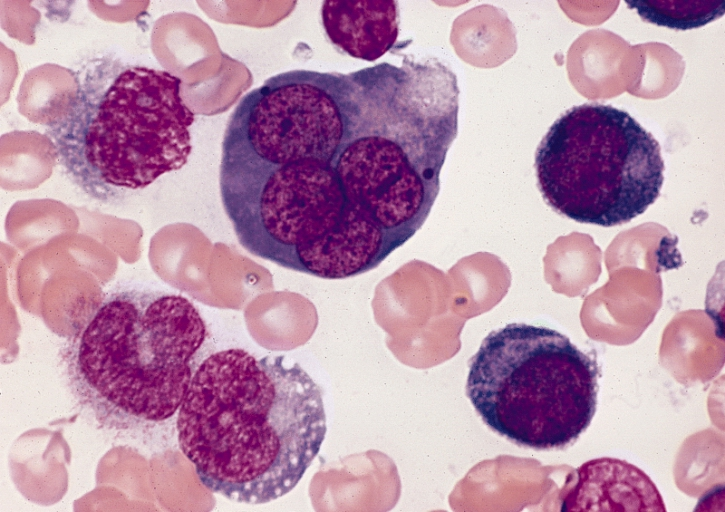
A bone marrow smear from a case of erythroleukemia. The large cell in the top center is an abnormal erythroblast: it is multinucleated, with megaloblastoid nuclear chromatin. This is diagnostic of erythroleukemia.

Cytopathology (sometimes referred to as "cytology") is a branch of pathology that studies and diagnoses diseases on the cellular level. It is usually used to aid in the diagnosis of cancer, but also helps in the diagnosis of certain infectious diseases and other inflammatory conditions as well as thyroid lesions, diseases involving sterile body cavities (peritoneal, pleural, and cerebrospinal), and a wide range of other body sites. Cytopathology is generally used on samples of free cells or tissue fragments (in contrast to histopathology, which studies whole tissues) and cytopathologic tests are sometimes called smear tests because the samples may be smeared across a glass microscope slide for subsequent staining and microscopic examination. However, cytology samples may be prepared in other ways, including cytocentrifugation.

==== Dermatopathology ====
A melanoma can often be suspected from sight, but confirmation of the diagnosis or outright removal requires a biopsy.

Dermatopathology is a subspecialty of anatomic pathology that focuses on the skin and the rest of the integumentary system as an organ. It is unique, in that there are two paths a physician can take to obtain the specialization. All general pathologists and general dermatologists train in the pathology of the skin, so the term dermatopathologist denotes either of these who has reached a certain level of accreditation and experience; in the US, either a general pathologist or a dermatologist can undergo a 1 to 2 year fellowship in the field of dermatopathology. The completion of this fellowship allows one to take a subspecialty board examination, and becomes a board certified dermatopathologist. Dermatologists are able to recognize most skin diseases based on their appearances, anatomic distributions, and behavior. Sometimes, however, those criteria do not lead to a conclusive diagnosis, and a skin biopsy is taken to be examined under the microscope using usual histological tests. In some cases, additional specialized testing needs to be performed on biopsies, including immunofluorescence, immunohistochemistry, electron microscopy, flow cytometry, and molecular-pathologic analysis. One of the greatest challenges of dermatopathology is its scope. More than 1500 different disorders of the skin exist, including cutaneous eruptions ("rashes") and neoplasms. Therefore, dermatopathologists must maintain a broad base of knowledge in clinical dermatology, and be familiar with several other specialty areas in Medicine.

==== Forensic pathology ====
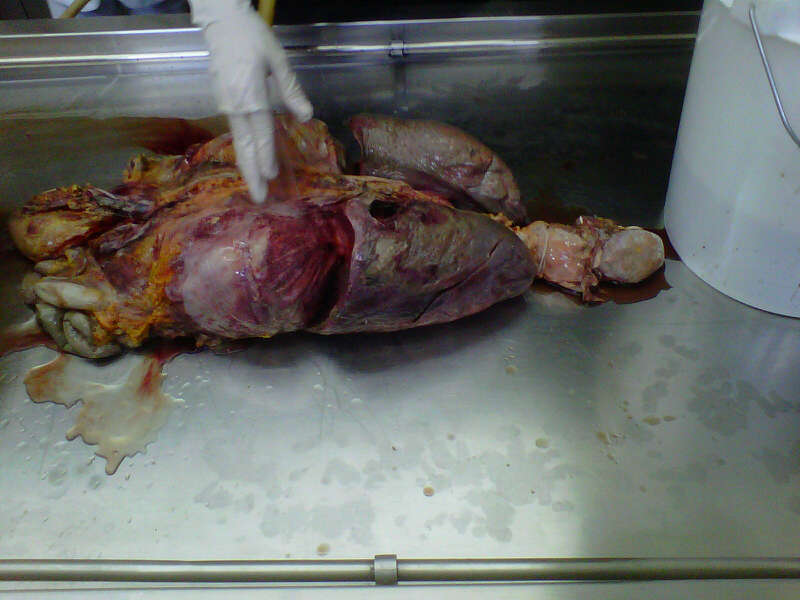
Pathologist performing a human dissection of the abdominal and thoracic organs in an autopsy room

Forensic pathology focuses on determining the cause of death by post-mortem examination of a corpse or partial remains. An autopsy is typically performed by a coroner or medical examiner, often during criminal investigations; in this role, coroners and medical examiners are also frequently asked to confirm the identity of a corpse. The requirements for becoming a licensed practitioner of forensic pathology varies from country to country (and even within a given nation) but typically a minimal requirement is a medical doctorate with a specialty in general or anatomical pathology with subsequent study in forensic medicine. The methods forensic scientists use to determine death include examination of tissue specimens to identify the presence or absence of natural disease and other microscopic findings, interpretations of toxicology on body tissues and fluids to determine the chemical cause of overdoses, poisonings or other cases involving toxic agents, and examinations of physical trauma. Forensic pathology is a major component in the trans-disciplinary field of forensic science.

==== Histopathology ====
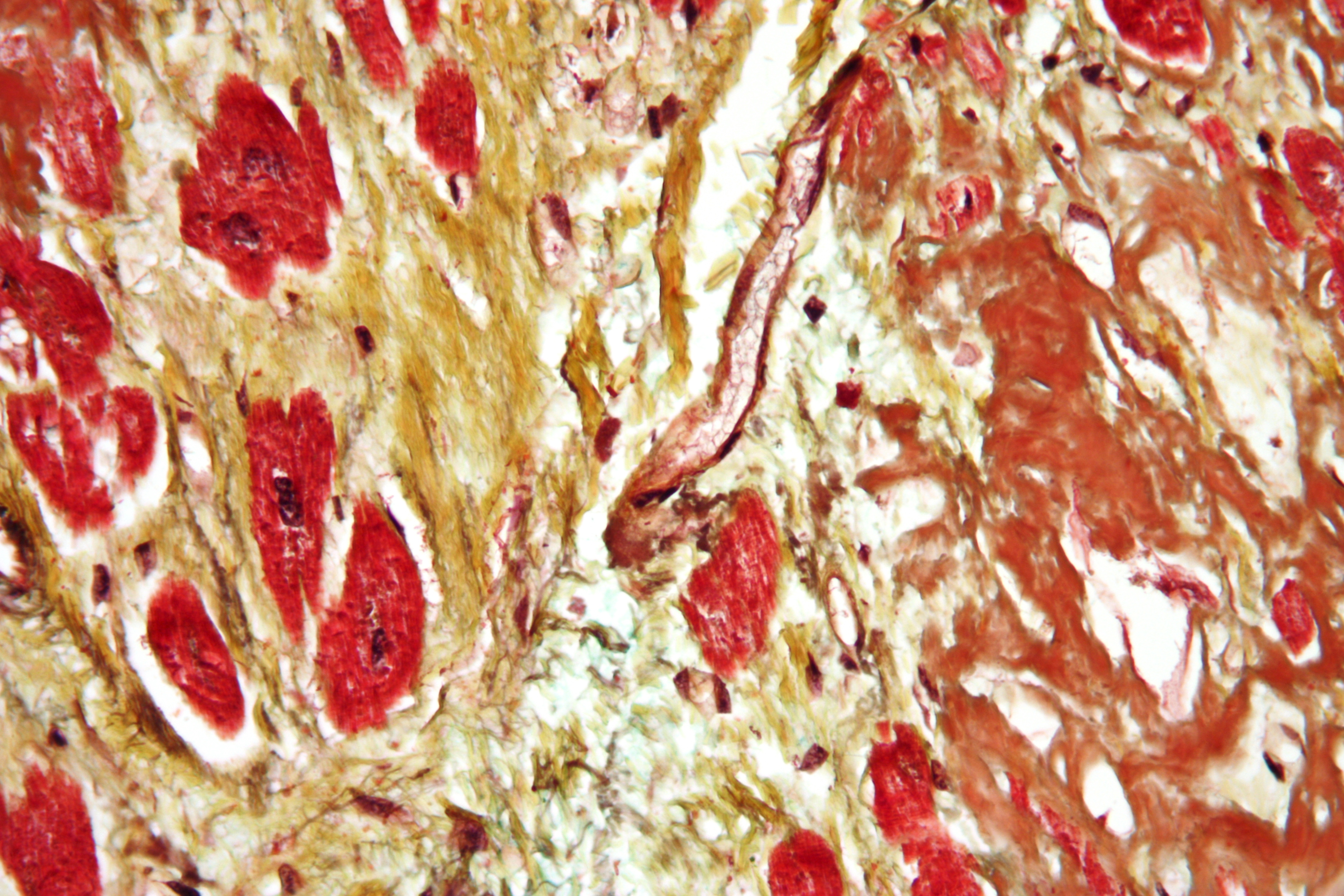
An instance of diagnosis via histopathology, this high-magnification micrograph of a section of cardiac tissue reveals advanced cardiac amyloidosis. This sample was attained through an autopsy.

Histopathology refers to the microscopic examination of various forms of human tissue. Specifically, in clinical medicine, histopathology refers to the examination of a biopsy or surgical specimen by a pathologist, after the specimen has been processed and histological sections have been placed onto glass slides. This contrasts with the methods of cytopathology, which uses free cells or tissue fragments. Histopathological examination of tissues starts with surgery, biopsy, or autopsy. The tissue is removed from the body of an organism and then placed in a fixative that stabilizes the tissues to prevent decay. The most common fixative is formalin, although frozen section fixing is also common. To see the tissue under a microscope, the sections are stained with one or more pigments. The aim of staining is to reveal cellular components; counterstains are used to provide contrast. Histochemistry refers to the science of using chemical reactions between laboratory chemicals and components within tissue. The histological slides are then interpreted diagnostically and the resulting pathology report describes the histological findings and the opinion of the pathologist. In the case of cancer, this represents the tissue diagnosis required for most treatment protocols.

==== Neuropathology ====
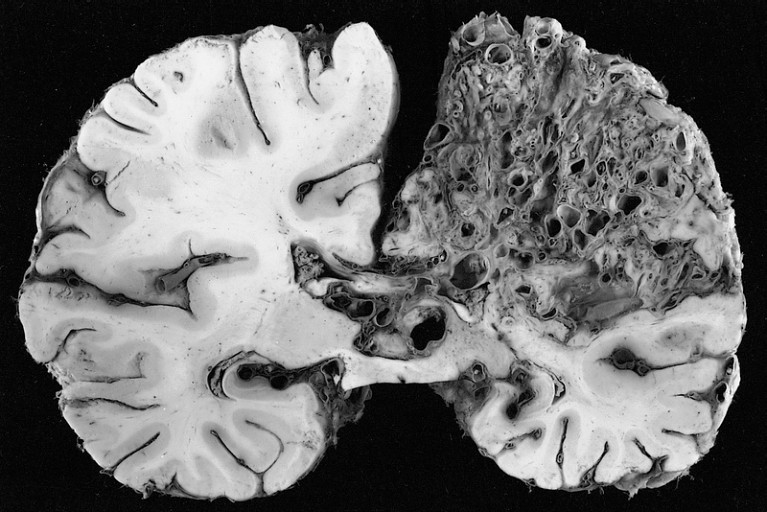
This coronal cross-section of a brain reveals a significant arteriovenous malformation that occupies much of the parietal lobe.

Neuropathology is the study of disease of nervous system tissue, usually in the form of either surgical biopsies or sometimes whole brains in the case of autopsy. Neuropathology is a subspecialty of anatomic pathology, neurology, and neurosurgery. In many English-speaking countries, neuropathology is considered a subfield of anatomical pathology. A physician who specializes in neuropathology, usually by completing a fellowship after a residency in anatomical or general pathology, is called a neuropathologist. In day-to-day clinical practice, a neuropathologist generates diagnoses for patients. If a disease of the nervous system is suspected, and the diagnosis cannot be made by less invasive methods, a biopsy of nervous tissue is taken from the brain or cerebrospinal fluid is extracted from the spinal cord to aid in diagnosis. Biopsy is usually requested after a mass is detected by medical imaging. With autopsies, the principal work of the neuropathologist is to help in the post-mortem diagnosis of various conditions that affect the central nervous system. Biopsies can also consist of the skin. Epidermal nerve fiber density testing (ENFD) is a more recently developed neuropathology test in which a punch skin biopsy is taken to identify small fiber neuropathies by analyzing the nerve fibers of the skin. This test is becoming available in select labs as well as many universities; it replaces the traditional nerve biopsy test as less invasive.

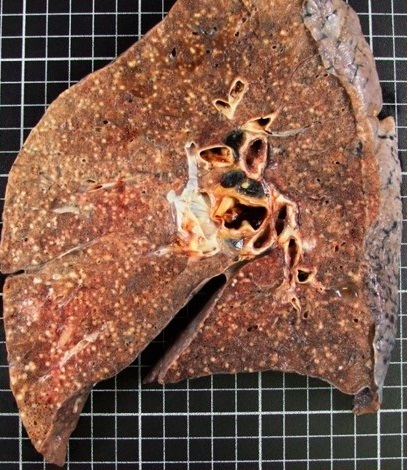
Gross pathology of miliary tuberculosis of the lung

==== Pulmonary pathology ====
Pulmonary pathology is a subspecialty of anatomic (and especially surgical) pathology that deals with diagnosis and characterization of neoplastic and non-neoplastic diseases of the lungs and thoracic pleura. Diagnostic specimens are often obtained via bronchoscopic transbronchial biopsy, CT-guided percutaneous biopsy, or video-assisted thoracic surgery. These tests can be necessary to diagnose between infection, inflammation, or fibrotic conditions.

==== Renal pathology ====
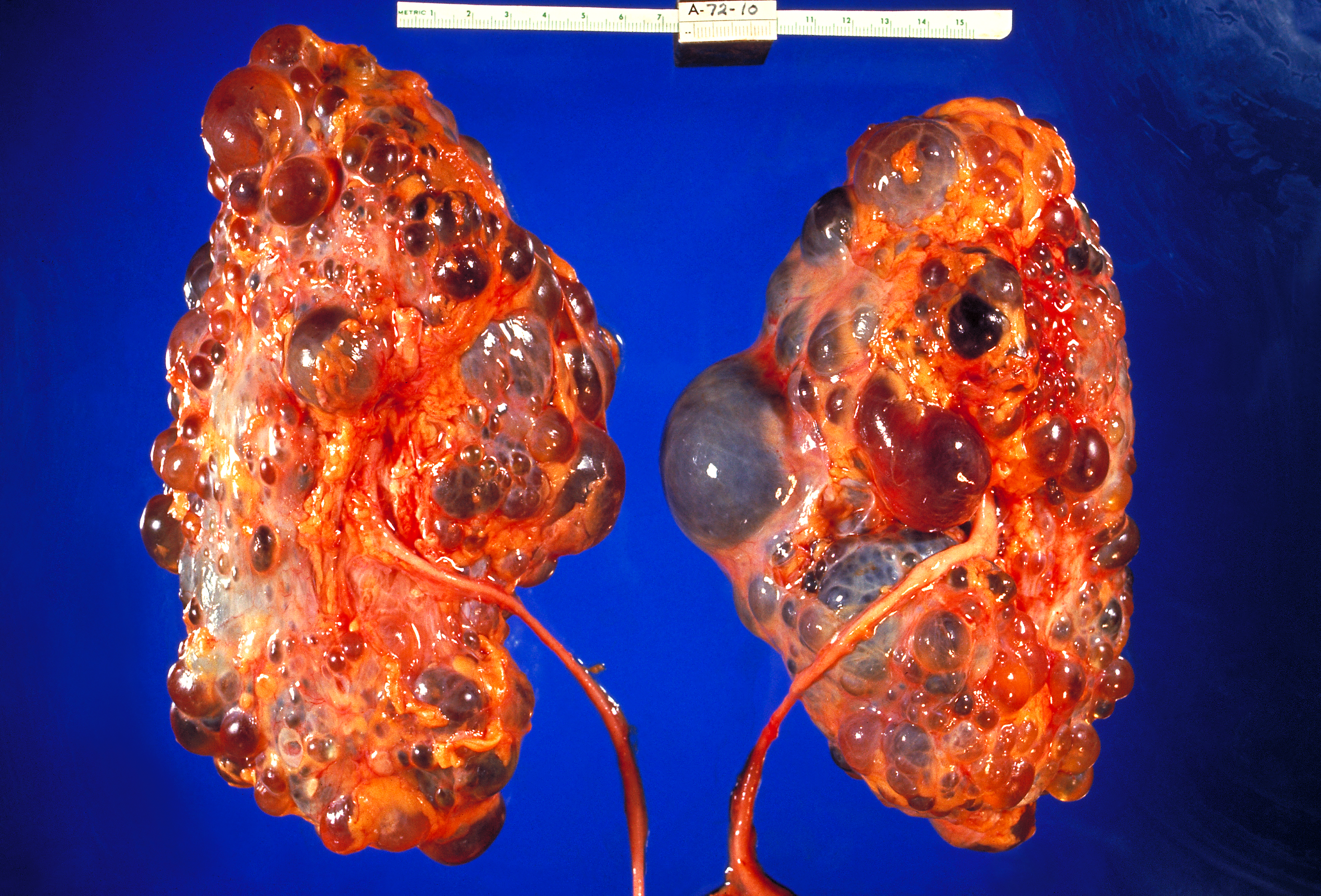
This tissue cross-section demonstrates the gross pathology of polycystic kidneys.

Renal pathology is a subspecialty of anatomic pathology that deals with the diagnosis and characterization of disease of the kidneys. In a medical setting, renal pathologists work closely with nephrologists and transplant surgeons, who typically obtain diagnostic specimens via percutaneous renal biopsy. The renal pathologist must synthesize findings from traditional microscope histology, electron microscopy, and immunofluorescence to obtain a definitive diagnosis. Medical renal diseases may affect the glomerulus, the tubules and interstitium, the vessels, or a combination of these compartments.

==== Surgical pathology ====
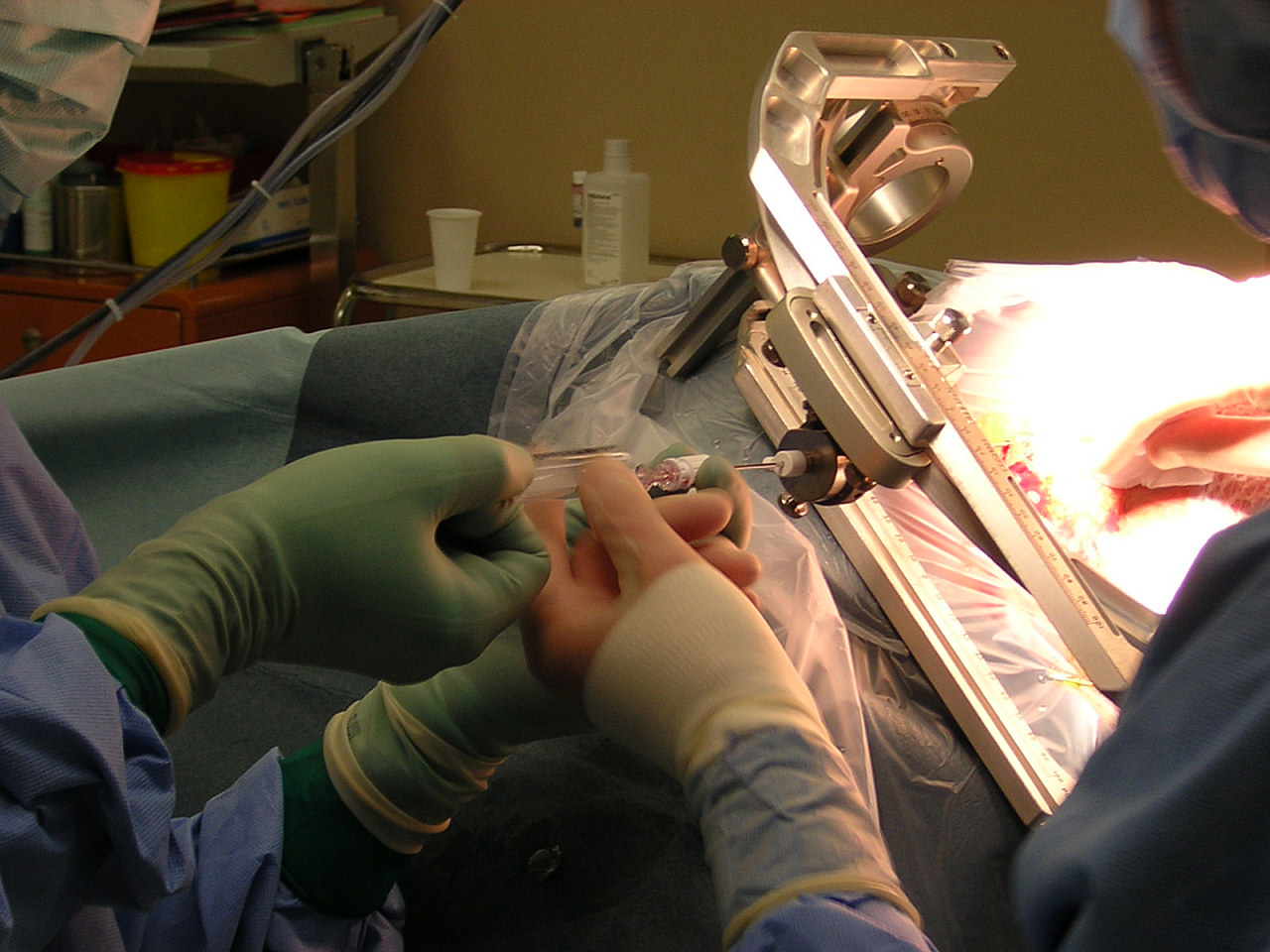
Brain biopsy under stereotaxy. A small part of the tumor is taken via a needle with a vacuum system.

Surgical pathology is one of the primary areas of practice for most anatomical pathologists. Surgical pathology involves the gross and microscopic examination of surgical specimens, as well as biopsies submitted by surgeons and non-surgeons such as general internists, medical subspecialists, dermatologists, and interventional radiologists. Often an excised tissue sample is the best and most definitive evidence of disease (or lack thereof) in cases where tissue is surgically removed from a patient. These determinations are usually accomplished by a combination of gross (i.e., macroscopic) and histologic (i.e., microscopic) examination of the tissue, and may involve evaluations of molecular properties of the tissue by immunohistochemistry or other laboratory tests.

There are two major types of specimens submitted for surgical pathology analysis: biopsies and surgical resections. A biopsy is a small piece of tissue removed primarily for surgical pathology analysis, most often in order to render a definitive diagnosis. Types of biopsies include core biopsies, which are obtained through the use of large-bore needles, sometimes under the guidance of radiological techniques such as ultrasound, CT scan, or magnetic resonance imaging. Incisional biopsies are obtained through diagnostic surgical procedures that remove part of a suspicious lesion, whereas excisional biopsies remove the entire lesion, and are similar to therapeutic surgical resections. Excisional biopsies of skin lesions and gastrointestinal polyps are very common. The pathologist's interpretation of a biopsy is critical to establishing the diagnosis of a benign or malignant tumor, and can differentiate between different types and grades of cancer, as well as determining the activity of specific molecular pathways in the tumor. Surgical resection specimens are obtained by the therapeutic surgical removal of an entire diseased area or organ (and occasionally multiple organs). These procedures are often intended as definitive surgical treatment of a disease in which the diagnosis is already known or strongly suspected, but pathological analysis of these specimens remains important in confirming the previous diagnosis.

=== Clinical pathology ===
Clinical pathology is a medical specialty that is concerned with the diagnosis of disease based on the laboratory analysis of bodily fluids such as blood and urine, as well as tissues, using the tools of chemistry, clinical microbiology, hematology and molecular pathology. Clinical pathologists work in close collaboration with medical technologists, hospital administrations, and referring physicians. Clinical pathologists learn to administer a number of visual and microscopic tests and an especially large variety of tests of the biophysical properties of tissue samples involving automated analysers and cultures. Sometimes the general term "laboratory medicine specialist" is used to refer to those working in clinical pathology, including medical doctors, Ph.D.s and doctors of pharmacology. Immunopathology, the study of an organism's immune response to infection, is sometimes considered to fall within the domain of clinical pathology.

==== Hematopathology ====
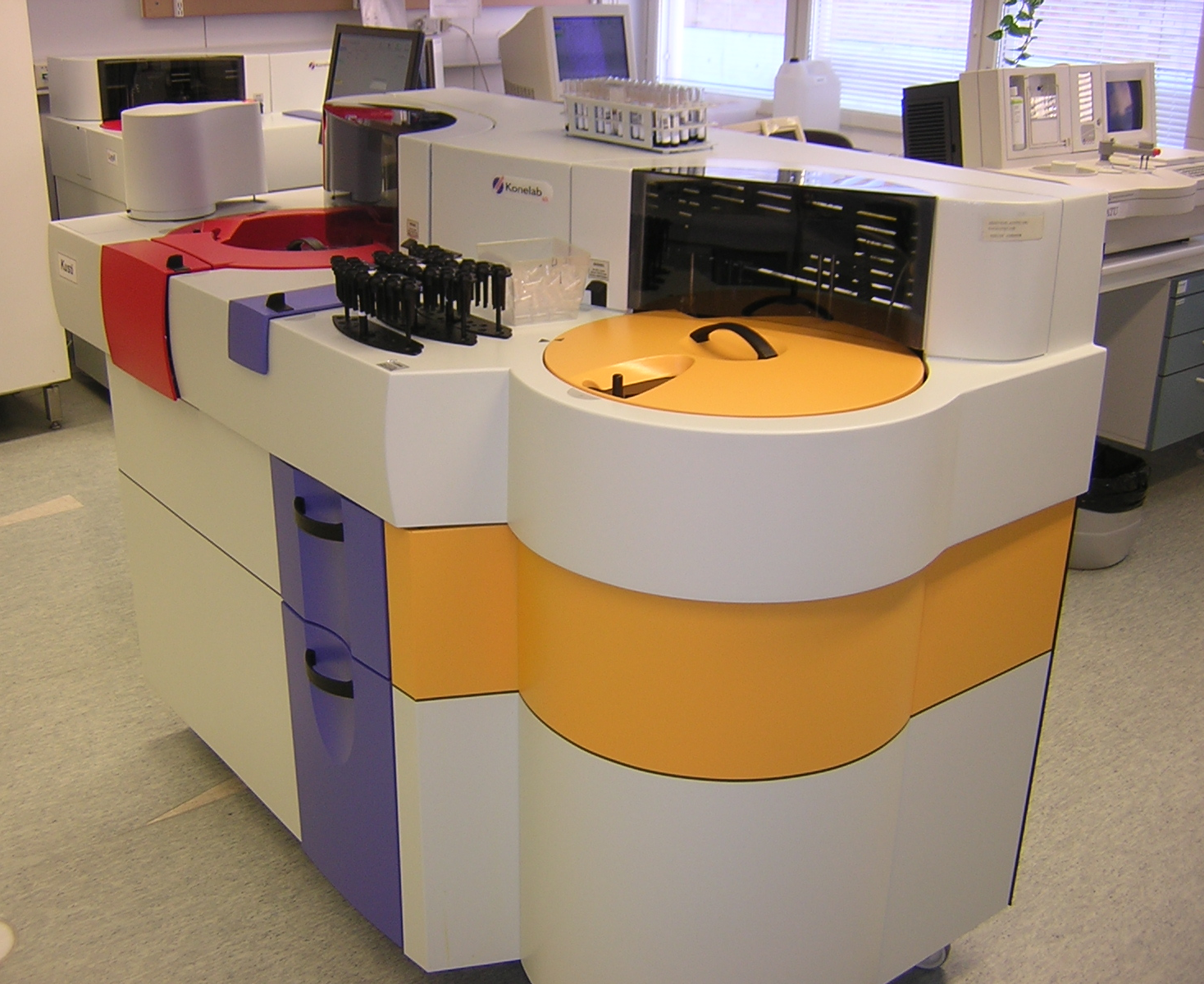
Clinical chemistry: an automated blood chemistry analyzer

Hematopathology is the study of diseases of blood cells (including constituents such as white blood cells, red blood cells, and platelets) and the tissues, and organs comprising the hematopoietic system. The term hematopoietic system refers to tissues and organs that produce and/or primarily host hematopoietic cells and includes bone marrow, the lymph nodes, thymus, spleen, and other lymphoid tissues. In the United States, hematopathology is a board certified subspecialty (licensed under the American Board of Pathology) practiced by those physicians who have completed a general pathology residency (anatomic, clinical, or combined) and an additional year of fellowship training in hematology. The hematopathologist reviews biopsies of lymph nodes, bone marrows and other tissues involved by an infiltrate of cells of the hematopoietic system. In addition, the hematopathologist may be in charge of flow cytometric and/or molecular hematopathology studies.

=== Molecular pathology ===
Molecular pathology is focused upon the study and diagnosis of disease through the examination of molecules within organs, tissues or bodily fluids. Molecular pathology is multidisciplinary by nature and shares some aspects of practice with both anatomic pathology and clinical pathology, molecular biology, biochemistry, proteomics and genetics. It is often applied in a context that is as much scientific as directly medical and encompasses the development of molecular and genetic approaches to the diagnosis and classification of human diseases, the design and validation of predictive biomarkers for treatment response and disease progression, and the susceptibility of individuals of different genetic constitution to particular disorders. The crossover between molecular pathology and epidemiology is represented by a related field "molecular pathological epidemiology". Molecular pathology is commonly used in diagnosis of cancer and infectious diseases. Molecular Pathology is primarily used to detect cancers such as melanoma, brainstem glioma, brain tumors as well as many other types of cancer and infectious diseases. Techniques are numerous but include quantitative polymerase chain reaction (qPCR), multiplex PCR, DNA microarray, in situ hybridization, DNA sequencing, antibody-based immunofluorescence tissue assays, molecular profiling of pathogens, and analysis of bacterial genes for antimicrobial resistance. Techniques used are based on analyzing samples of DNA and RNA. Pathology is widely used for gene therapy and disease diagnosis.

=== Oral and maxillofacial pathology ===
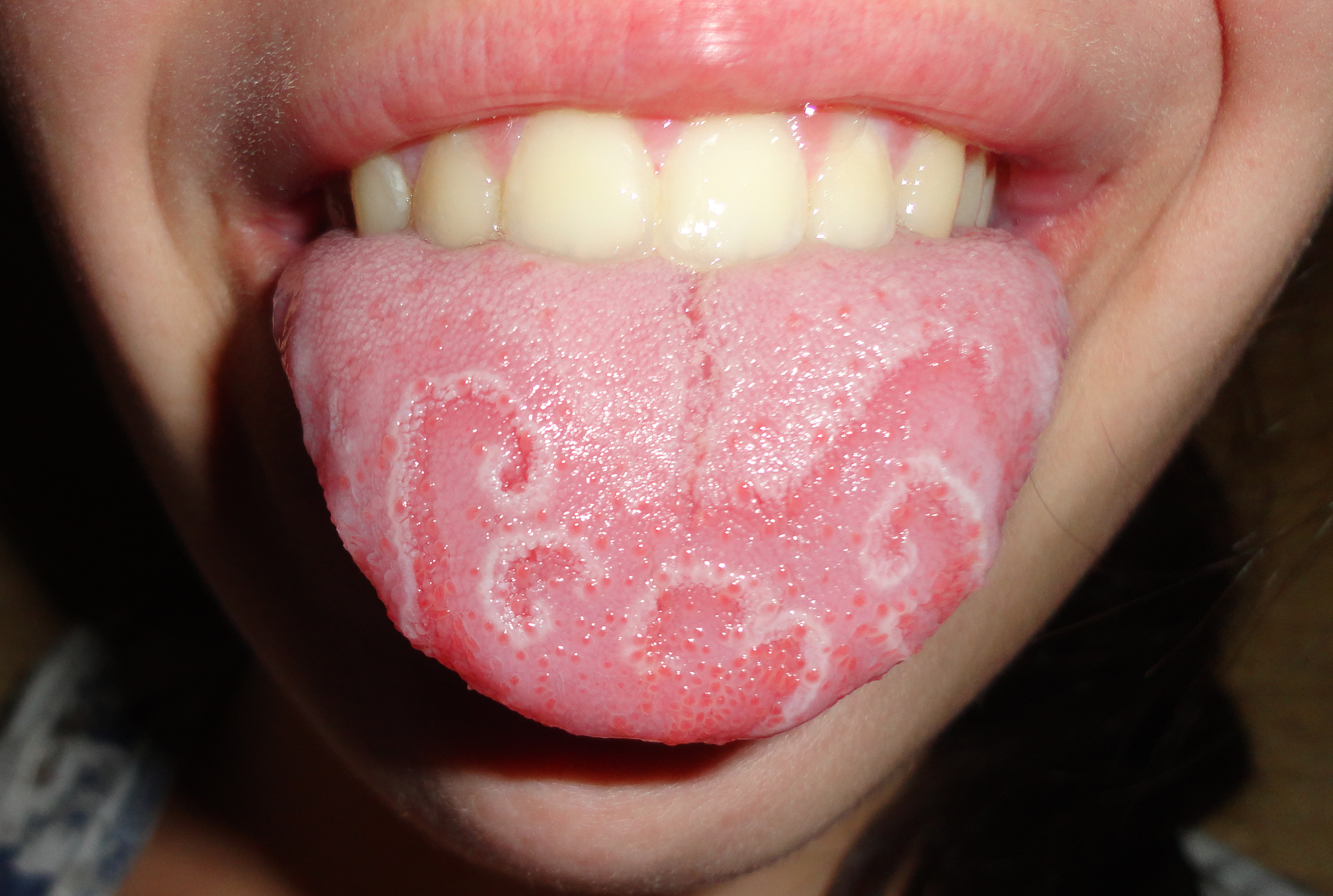
Many conditions, such as this case of geographic tongue, can be diagnosed partly on gross examination, but may be confirmed with tissue pathology.

Oral and Maxillofacial Pathology is one of nine dental specialties recognized by the American Dental Association, and is sometimes considered a specialty of both dentistry and pathology. Oral Pathologists must complete three years of post doctoral training in an accredited program and subsequently obtain diplomate status from the American Board of Oral and Maxillofacial Pathology. The specialty focuses on the diagnosis, clinical management and investigation of diseases that affect the oral cavity and surrounding maxillofacial structures including but not limited to odontogenic, infectious, epithelial, salivary gland, bone and soft tissue pathologies. It also significantly intersects with the field of dental pathology. Although concerned with a broad variety of diseases of the oral cavity, they have roles distinct from otorhinolaryngologists ("ear, nose, and throat" specialists), and speech pathologists, the latter of which helps diagnose many neurological or neuromuscular conditions relevant to speech phonology or swallowing. Owing to the availability of the oral cavity to non-invasive examination, many conditions in the study of oral disease can be diagnosed, or at least suspected, from gross examination, but biopsies, cell smears, and other tissue analysis remain important diagnostic tools in oral pathology.

== Medical training and accreditation ==
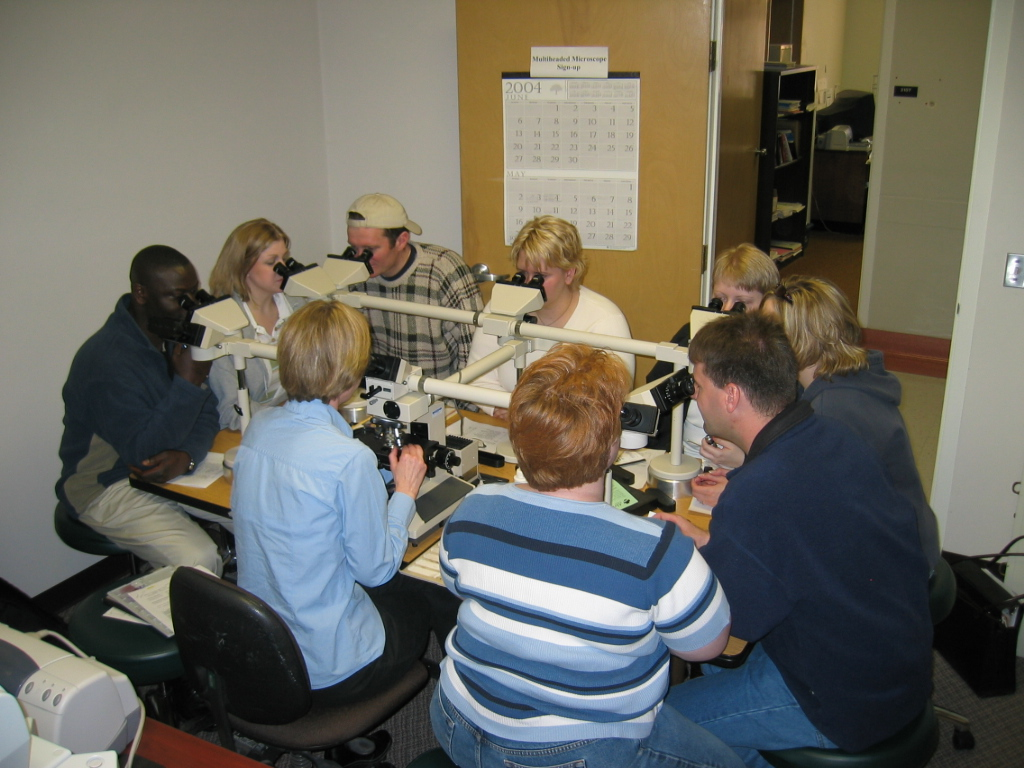
An anatomical pathology instructor uses a microscope with multiple eyepieces to instruct students in diagnostic microscopy.

Becoming a pathologist generally requires specialty-training after medical school, but individual nations vary somewhat in the medical licensing required of pathologists. In the United States, pathologists are physicians (D.O. or M.D.) who have completed a four-year undergraduate program, four years of medical school training, and three to four years of postgraduate training in the form of a pathology residency. Training may be within two primary specialties, as recognized by the American Board of Pathology: anatomical pathology and clinical pathology, each of which requires separate board certification. The American Osteopathic Board of Pathology also recognizes four primary specialties: anatomic pathology, dermatopathology, forensic pathology, and laboratory medicine. Pathologists may pursue specialised fellowship training within one or more subspecialties of either anatomical or clinical pathology. Some of these subspecialties permit additional board certification, while others do not.

In the United Kingdom, pathologists are physicians licensed by the UK General Medical Council. The training to become a pathologist is overseen by the Royal College of Pathologists. After four to six years of undergraduate medical study, trainees proceed to a two-year foundation program. Full-time training in histopathology currently lasts between five and five and a half years, encompassing specialist training in surgical pathology, cytopathology, and autopsy pathology. It is also possible to take a Royal College of Pathologists diploma in forensic pathology, dermatopathology, or cytopathology, recognising additional specialist training and expertise, and to get specialist accreditation in forensic pathology, pediatric pathology, and neuropathology. The General Medical Council oversees all postgraduate medical training and education in the UK.

In France, pathology is separated into two distinct specialties: anatomical pathology and clinical pathology. Residencies for both last four years. Residency in anatomical pathology is open to physicians only, while clinical pathology is open to both physicians and pharmacists. At the end of the second year of clinical pathology residency, residents can choose between general clinical pathology and a specialization in one of the disciplines, but they can not practice anatomical pathology, nor can anatomical pathology residents practice clinical pathology.

== Overlap with other diagnostic medicine ==
Though separate fields in terms of medical practice, a number of areas of inquiry in medicine and medical science either overlap greatly with general pathology, work in tandem with it, or contribute significantly to the understanding of the pathology of a given disease or its course in an individual. As a significant portion of all general pathology practice is concerned with cancer, the practice of oncology makes extensive use of both anatomical and clinical pathology in diagnosis and treatment. In particular, biopsy, resection, and blood tests are all examples of pathology work that is essential for the diagnoses of many kinds of cancer and for the staging of cancerous masses. In a similar fashion, the tissue and blood analysis techniques of general pathology are of central significance to the investigation of serious infectious disease and as such inform significantly upon the fields of epidemiology, etiology, immunology, and parasitology. General pathology methods are of great importance to biomedical research into disease, wherein they are sometimes referred to as "experimental" or "investigative" pathology.

Medical imaging is the generating of visual representations of the interior of a body for clinical analysis and medical intervention. Medical imaging reveals details of internal physiology that help medical professionals plan appropriate treatments for tissue infection and trauma. Medical imaging is also central in supplying the biometric data necessary to establish baseline features of anatomy and physiology so as to increase the accuracy with which early or fine-detail abnormalities are detected. These diagnostic techniques are often performed in combination with general pathology procedures and are themselves often essential to developing new understanding of the pathogenesis of a given disease and tracking the progress of disease in specific medical cases. Examples of important subdivisions in medical imaging include radiology (which uses the imaging technologies of X-ray radiography) magnetic resonance imaging, medical ultrasonography (or ultrasound), endoscopy, elastography, tactile imaging, thermography, medical photography, nuclear medicine and functional imaging techniques such as positron emission tomography. Though they do not strictly relay images, readings from diagnostics tests involving electroencephalography, magnetoencephalography, and electrocardiography often give hints as to the state and function of certain tissues in the brain and heart respectively.

== Pathology informatics ==
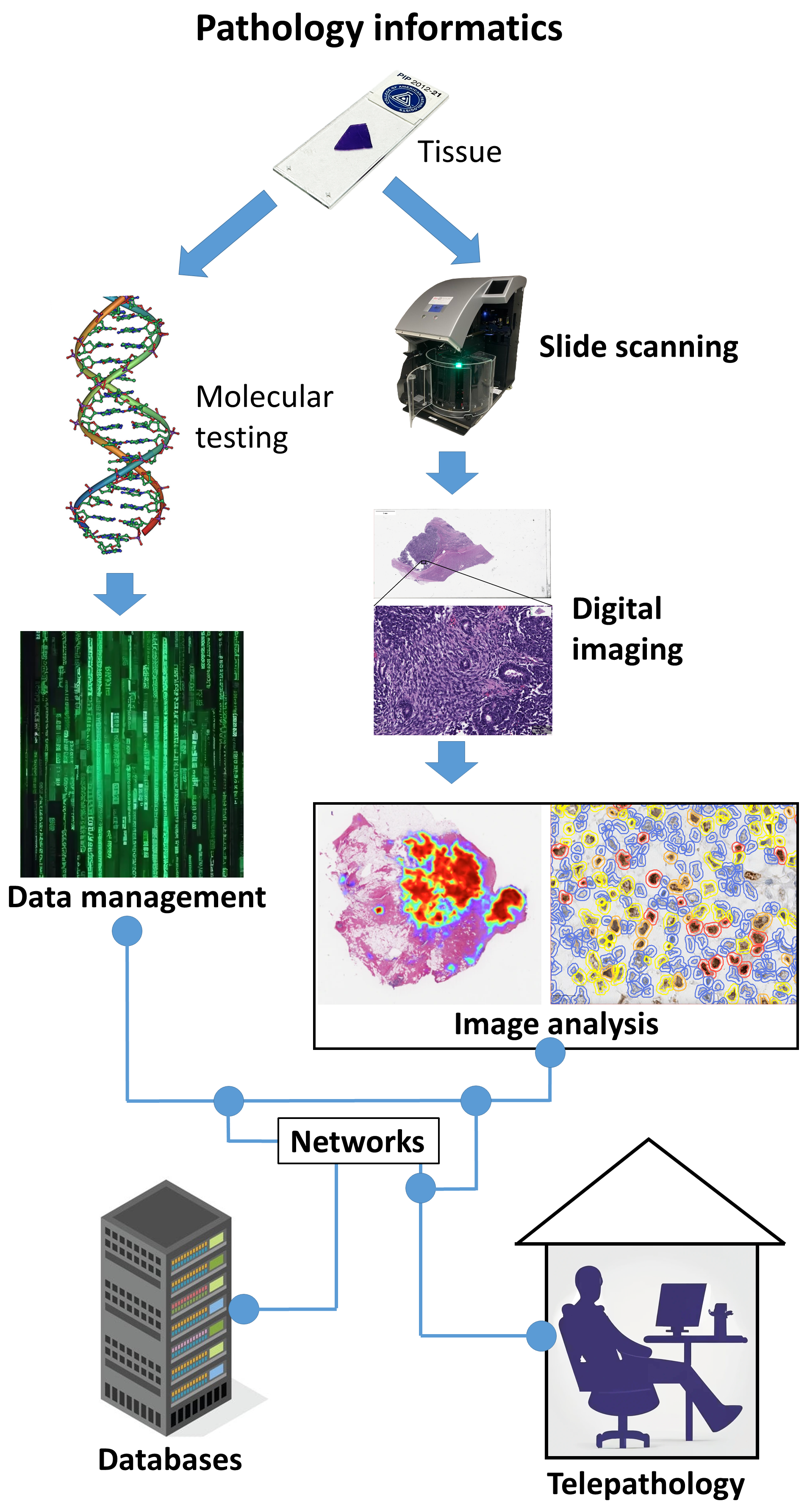
Major topics and processes of pathology informatics: Data management from molecular testing, slide scanning, digital imaging and image analysis, networks, databases and telepathology.

Pathology informatics is a subfield of health informatics. It is the use of information technology in pathology. It encompasses pathology laboratory operations, data analysis, and the interpretation of pathology-related information.

Key aspects of pathology informatics include:

- Laboratory information management systems (LIMS): Implementing and managing computer systems specifically designed for pathology departments. These systems help in tracking and managing patient specimens, results, and other pathology data.
- Digital pathology: Involves the use of digital technology to create, manage, and analyze pathology images. This includes side scanning and automated image analysis.
- Telepathology: Using technology to enable remote pathology consultation and collaboration.
- Quality assurance and reporting: Implementing informatics solutions to ensure the quality and accuracy of pathology processes.

== Psychopathology ==
Psychopathology is the study of mental illness, particularly of severe disorders. Informed heavily by both psychology and neurology, its purpose is to classify mental illness, elucidate its underlying causes, and guide clinical psychiatric treatment accordingly. Although diagnosis and classification of mental norms and disorders is largely the purview of psychiatry—the results of which are guidelines such as the Diagnostic and Statistical Manual of Mental Disorders, which attempt to classify mental disease mostly on behavioural evidence, though not without controversy—the field is also heavily, and increasingly, informed upon by neuroscience and other of the biological cognitive sciences. Mental or social disorders or behaviours seen as generally unhealthy or excessive in a given individual, to the point where they cause harm or severe disruption to the person's lifestyle, are often called "pathological" (e.g., pathological gambling or pathological liar).

== Non-humans ==
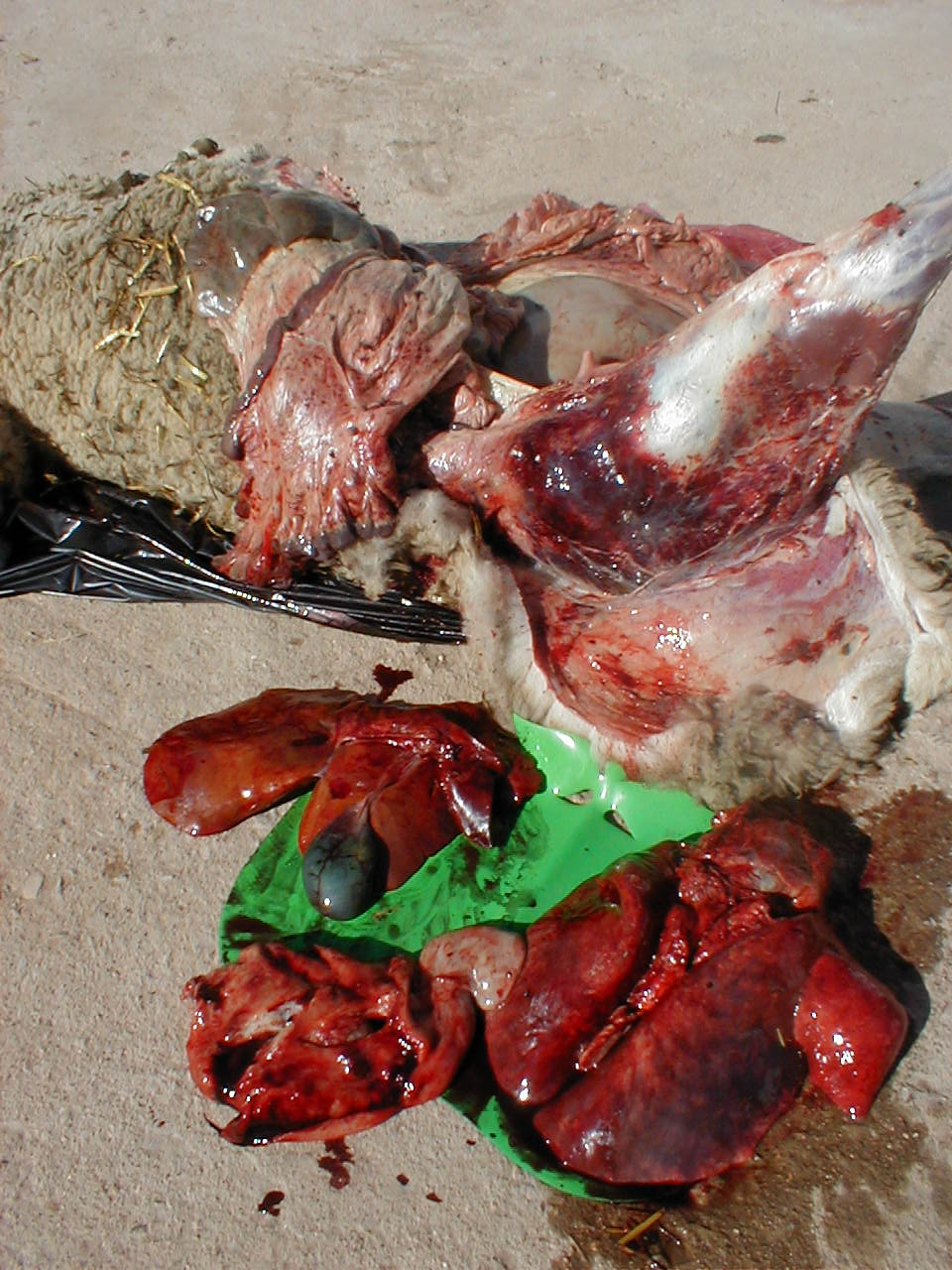
This field post-mortem of a ewe has revealed lesions consistent with acute haemolytic pneumonia, possibly due to Pasteurella haemolytica.

Although the vast majority of lab work and research in pathology concerns the development of disease in humans, pathology is of significance throughout the biological sciences. Two main catch-all fields exist to represent most complex organisms capable of serving as host to a pathogen or other form of disease: veterinary pathology (concerned with all non-human species of kingdom of Animalia) and phytopathology, which studies disease in plants.

=== Veterinary pathology ===
Veterinary pathology covers a vast array of species, but with a significantly smaller number of practitioners, so understanding of disease in non-human animals, especially as regards veterinary practice, varies considerably by species. Nevertheless, significant amounts of pathology research are conducted on animals, for two primary reasons: 1) The origins of diseases are typically zoonotic in nature, and many infectious pathogens have animal vectors and, as such, understanding the mechanisms of action for these pathogens in non-human hosts is essential to the understanding and application of epidemiology and 2) those animals that share physiological and genetic traits with humans can be used as surrogates for the study of the disease and potential treatments as well as the effects of various synthetic products. For this reason, as well as their roles as livestock and companion animals, mammals generally have the largest body of research in veterinary pathology. Animal testing remains a controversial practice, even in cases where it is used to research treatment for human disease. As in human medical pathology, the practice of veterinary pathology is customarily divided into the two main fields of anatomical and clinical pathology.

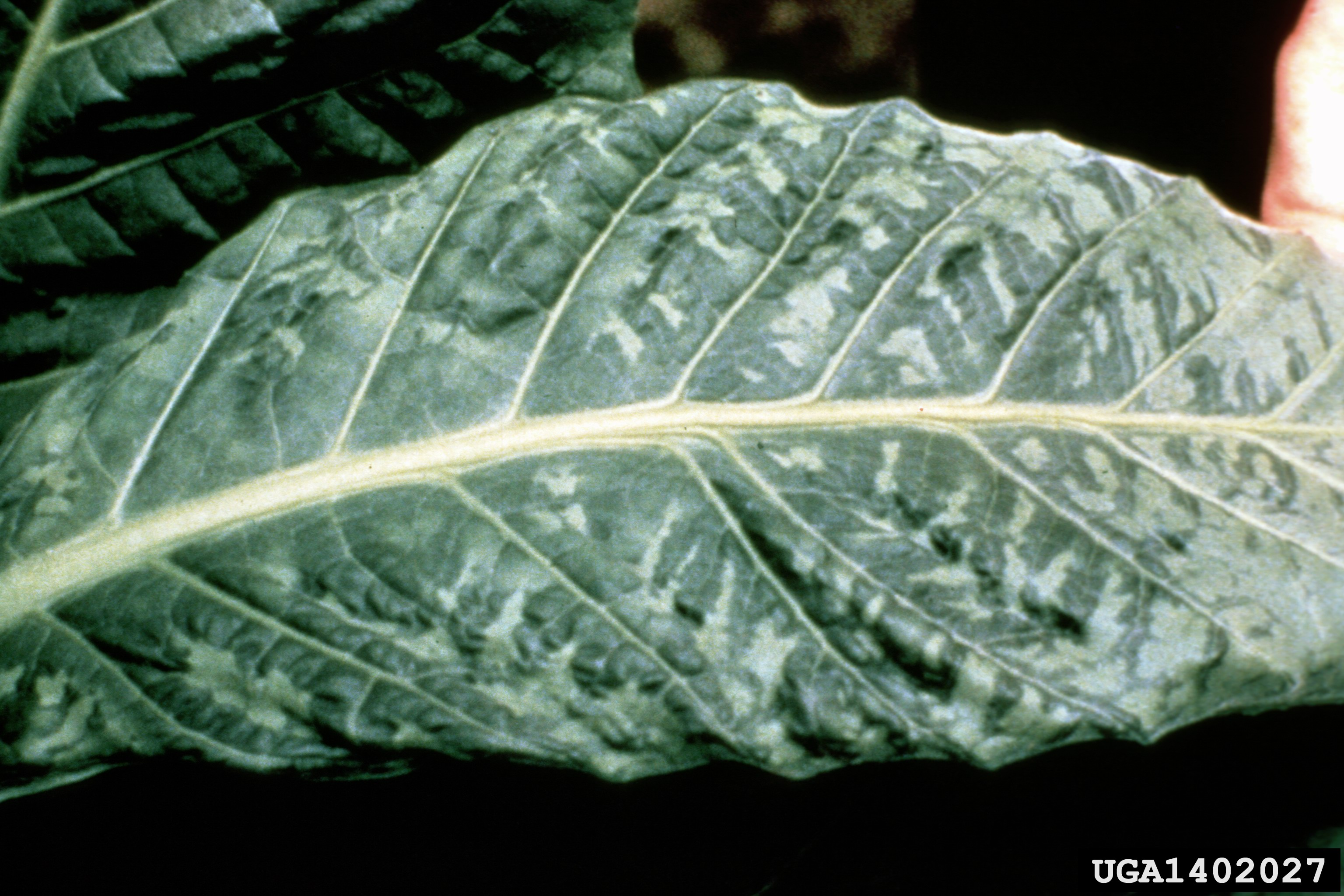
A tobacco plant infected with the tobacco mosaic virus

=== Plant pathology ===
Although the pathogens and their mechanics differ greatly from those of animals, plants are subject to a wide variety of diseases, including those caused by fungi, oomycetes, bacteria, viruses, viroids, virus-like organisms, phytoplasmas, protozoa, nematodes and parasitic plants. Damage caused by insects, mites, vertebrate, and other small herbivores is not considered a part of the domain of plant pathology. The field is connected to plant disease epidemiology and especially concerned with the horticulture of species that are of high importance to the human diet or other human utility.

== See also ==
- Biopsy
- Causal inference
- Cell (biology)
- Disease
- Environmental pathology
- Epidemiology
- Etiology (medicine)
- Hematology
- Histology
- Immunology
- List of pathologists
- Medical diagnosis
- Medical jurisprudence
- Medicine
- Microbiology
- Microscopy
- Minimally-invasive procedures
- Oncology
- Parasitology
- Pathogen
- Pathogenesis
- Pathophysiology
- Precision medicine
- Spectroscopy
- Speech–language pathology
- Telepathology
