= Dermatology =

Field of medicine dealing with the hair, nails, skin, and its diseases

- System: Skin
- Significant diseases: Skin cancer, skin infections, eczemas, burn
- Significant tests: Skin biopsy, dermoscopy
- Specialist: Dermatologist

Dermatology is the branch of medicine dealing with the skin and integumentary system. It is a specialty with both medical and surgical aspects. A dermatologist is a specialist medical doctor who has undergone advanced training (typically 4 years beyond medical school) and manages diseases related to skin.

Dermatological conditions, including inflammatory diseases, infections, cancers, hair loss, and cosmetic issues are common in the population, and sometimes difficult to diagnose or treat, requiring the services of a dermatologist. In addition to these routine issues, some conditions such as serious burns, angiodema, necrotizing fasciitis, and Stevens–Johnson syndrome are life-threatening dermatological emergencies. Dermatological interventions include systemic and topical medications, surgery, radiation, and physical modalities such as cryosurgery or laser therapy.

== Etymology ==
Attested in English in 1819, the word "dermatology" derives from the Greek δέρματος (dermatos), genitive of δέρμα (derma), "skin" (itself from δέρω dero, "to flay") and -λογία -logia. Neo-Latin dermatologia was coined in 1630, an anatomical term with various French and German uses attested from the 1730s.

== History ==
In 1708, the first great school of dermatology became a reality at the famous Hôpital Saint-Louis in Paris, and the first textbooks (Willan's, 1798–1808) and atlases (Alibert's, 1806–1816) appeared in print around the same time.

== Training ==
Dermatologist
Occupation
- Names: Doctor, medical specialist
- Occupation type: Specialty
- Activity sectors: Medicine, surgery

Description
- Education required: Doctor of Medicine (M.D.) or Doctor of Osteopathic Medicine (D.O.) or Bachelor of Medicine, Bachelor of Surgery
- Fields of employment: Hospitals, Clinics

=== Global Overview ===
Dermatology training and workforce availability vary substantially worldwide. A 2026 study covering 158 countries, representing 97% of the world's population, estimated that there were approximately 175,600 dermatologists worldwide, with a mean density of 2.66 per 100,000 population. Dermatologist density ranged from 0.37 per 100,000 in low-income countries to 5.05 in high-income countries, while 21% of responding countries lacked dermatology training programs.

=== United States ===
After earning a medical degree (M.D. or D.O.), the length of training in the United States for a general dermatologist to be eligible for board certification by the American Academy of Dermatology, American Board of Dermatology, or American Osteopathic Board of Dermatology is four years. This training consists of an initial medical, transitional, surgical, or pediatric intern year followed by a three-year dermatology residency. Following this training, one- or two-year post-residency fellowships are available in immunodermatology, phototherapy, laser medicine, Mohs micrographic surgery, cosmetic surgery, dermatopathology, or pediatric dermatology. While these dermatology fellowships offer additional subspecialty training, many dermatologists proficiently provide these services without subspecialty fellowship training. For the past several years, dermatology residency positions in the United States have been one of the most competitive to obtain.

According to the American Academy of Dermatology, dermatologists are trained to diagnose and manage over 3,000 distinct skin, hair, and nail conditions across patients spanning various age groups.

The United States has been experiencing a national shortage of dermatologists for more than a decade. A study published by the Journal of the American Medical Association reported fewer than 3.4 dermatologists for every 100,000 people.

=== United Kingdom ===
In the UK, a dermatologist is a medically qualified practitioner who has gone on to specialise in medicine and then subspecialize in dermatology. This involves:

- medical school for five years to obtain a medical degree (MB BS, MB ChB, MB BCh, MB BChir, BM BCh, BM BCh, MB, among other variations);
- two years of foundation rotations in various specialties;
- two to three years training in general medicine to obtain a higher degree in medicine and become a member of the Royal College of Physicians;
- having obtained the MRCP examination, applying to become a Specialty Registrar (StR) in Dermatology and training for four years in dermatology; and
- passing the Specialty Certificate Examination in dermatology before the end of training.

Upon successful completion of the four-year training period, the doctor becomes an accredited dermatologist and is able to apply for a consultant hospital post as a consultant dermatologist.

== Fields ==
=== Cosmetic dermatology ===
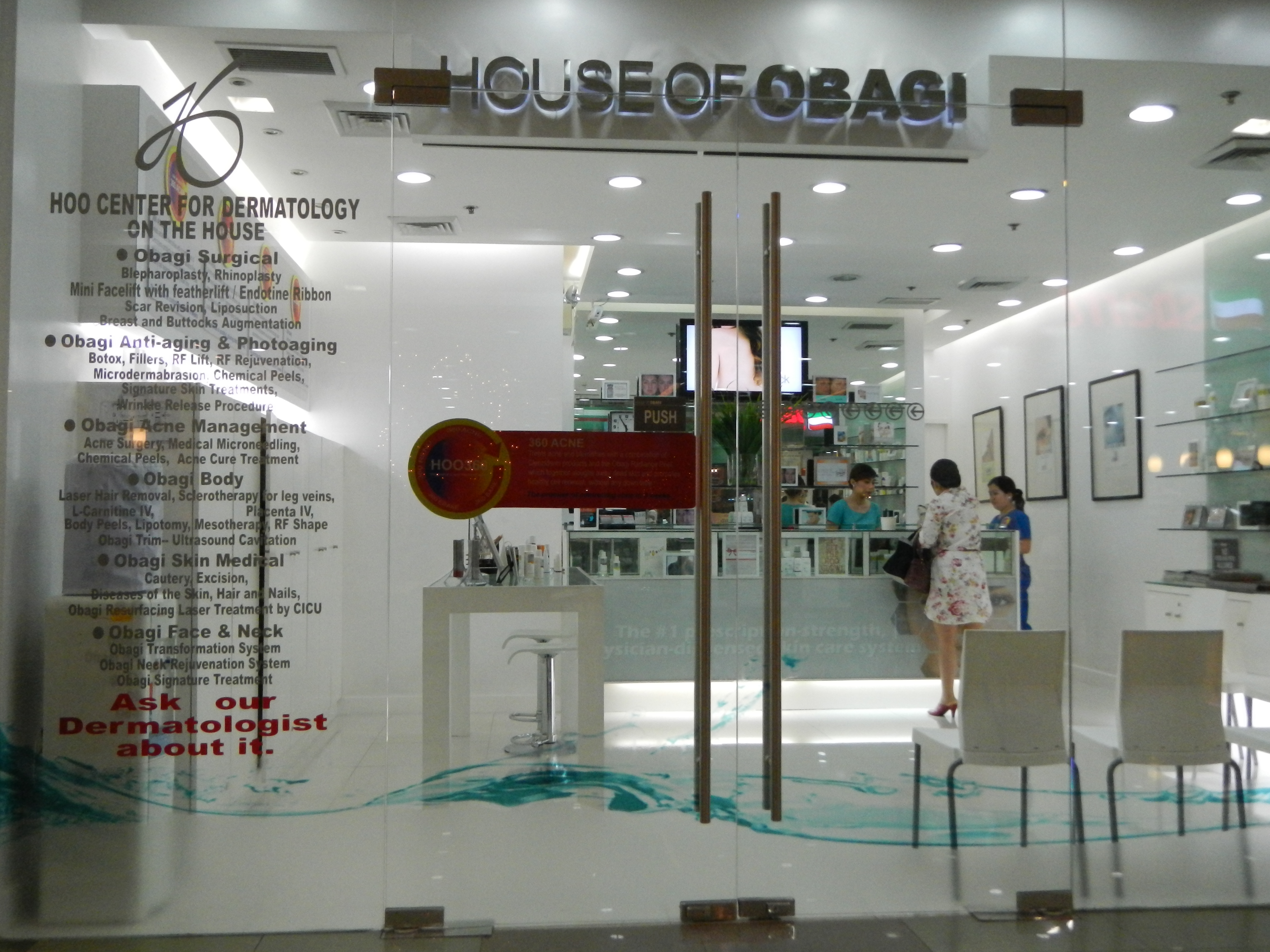
A Cosmetic dermatology unit in SM City North Edsa, Philippines

Dermatologists have been leaders in the field of cosmetic surgery. Some dermatologists complete fellowships in surgical dermatology. Many are trained in their residency on the use of botulinum toxin, fillers, and laser surgery. Some dermatologists perform cosmetic procedures including liposuction, blepharoplasty, and face lifts. Most dermatologists limit their cosmetic practice to minimally invasive procedures. Despite an absence of formal guidelines from the American Board of Dermatology, many cosmetic fellowships are offered in both surgery and laser medicine.

=== Dermatopathology ===
A dermatopathologist is a pathologist or dermatologist who specializes in the pathology of the skin. This field is shared by dermatologists and pathologists. Usually, a dermatologist or pathologist completes one year of dermatopathology fellowship, which typically includes six months of general pathology and six months of dermatopathology. Alumni of both specialties can qualify as dermatopathologists. At the completion of a standard residency in dermatology, many dermatologists are also competent at dermatopathology. To sit for the subspecialty certifying examination, candidates must hold primary certification in either dermatology or pathology and complete one year of accredited dermatopathology fellowship training.

=== Trichology ===
Trichology specializes in diseases, which manifest with hair loss, hair abnormalities, hypertrichosis and scalp changes. Trichoscopy is a medical diagnostic method that is used by dermatologists with a special interest in trichology.

=== Immunodermatology ===
This field specializes in the treatment of immune-mediated skin diseases such as lupus, bullous pemphigoid, pemphigus vulgaris, and other immune-mediated skin disorders. Specialists in this field often run their own immunopathology labs. Immunodermatology testing is essential for the correct diagnosis and treatment of many diseases affecting epithelial organs including skin, mucous membranes, gastrointestinal and respiratory tracts. The various diseases often overlap in clinical and histological presentation and, although the diseases themselves are not common, may present with features of common skin disorders such as urticaria, eczema and chronic itch. Therefore, the diagnosis of an immunodermatological disease is often delayed. Tests are performed on blood and tissues that are sent to various laboratories from medical facilities and referring physicians across the United States.

=== Mohs surgery ===
The dermatologic subspecialty called Mohs surgery focuses on the excision of skin cancers using a technique that allows intraoperative assessment of most of the peripheral and deep tumor margins. Developed in the 1930s by Frederic E. Mohs, the procedure is defined as a type of CCPDMA processing. Physicians trained in this technique must be comfortable with both pathology and surgery, and dermatologists receive extensive training in both during their residency. Physicians who perform Mohs surgery can receive training in this specialized technique during their dermatology residency, but many seek additional training either through formal preceptorships to become fellows of the American Society for Mohs Surgery or through one-year Mohs surgery fellowship training programs administered by the American College of Mohs Surgery. In 2020, the American Board of Dermatology (ABD) received approval from the American Board of Medical Specialties (ABMS) to establish a board-certification exam in the subspecialty of Micrographic Dermatologic Surgery (Mohs Surgery). The exam was first offered in October 2021 to any US board-certified dermatologist who practices Mohs surgery, regardless of whether they received their training in dermatology residency or as part of a fellowship.

This technique requires the integration of the same doctor in two different capacities - a surgeon and pathologist. In the case where either one is not available, a plastic surgeon can assist in Mohs surgery. However, plastic surgeons are not trained for this type of procedure, so a specialist is generally required.

=== Pediatric dermatology ===
Physicians can qualify for this specialization by completing both a pediatric residency and a dermatology residency. Or they might elect to complete a post-residency fellowship. This field encompasses the complex diseases of the neonates, hereditary skin diseases or genodermatoses, and the many difficulties of working with the pediatric population. Another area pediatric dermatologists may focus on is treating acne. Acne is formed when follicles under the skin become clogged. This can be caused by sebum, an oil that keeps the skin moist, or dead skin cells clogging the pores. This is very common in teens and young adults, and can be treated by prescription from a dermatologist.

=== Teledermatology ===
Teledermatology is a form of dermatological practice in which telecommunication technologies are used to exchange medical information and treatment through audio, visual, and data communication, including photos of dermatologic conditions, between dermatologists and nondermatologists who are evaluating patients, along with dermatologists directly with patients via distance. In India, during the severe coronavirus situations, some dermatologists have initiated online consultation with their patients using some of popular apps, such as Practo, Apollo Pharmacy, Skin Beauty Pal, Lybrate, etc. This subspecialty deals with options to view skin conditions over a large distance to provide knowledge exchange, to establish second-opinion services for experts, or to use this for follow-up of individuals with chronic skin conditions. Teledermatology can reduce wait times by allowing dermatologists to treat minor conditions online while serious conditions requiring immediate care are given priority for appointments.

=== Dermatoepidemiology ===
Dermatoepidemiology is the study of skin disease at the population level. One of its aspects is the determination of the global burden of skin diseases. From 1990 to 2013, skin disease constituted about 2% of total global disease disability as measured in disability-adjusted life-years.

=== Comparative dermatology ===
Comparative dermatology is a branch of dermatology that examines skin disorders across species, focusing on similarities and differences between humans and animals, such as dogs. This approach is needed for improving our understanding of dermatological conditions and developing more effective treatment and prevention strategies.

Skin disorders are common in dogs, affecting their quality of life and often requiring veterinary intervention. While some breeds are genetically predisposed to specific skin issues, there remains a gap in research comparing these conditions to similar human skin disorders. This gap can give insights into the shared mechanisms underlying these diseases. For instance, atopic dermatitis. It is a common, itchy, and difficult-to-treat condition. By comparing the disease in animals and humans, researchers can gain information into its progression and variability in response to treatments.

Furthermore, research into the genetic origin of skin disorders has demonstrated that certain genetic mutations in dogs are associated with inherited skin diseases, which may serve as models for understanding similar human conditions. Environmental factors, such as allergens and pollutants, also affects skin health. Studies published in journals focusing on inflammatory skin conditions in humans and veterinary research reveal how these environmental influences intersect with genetic predispositions, offering a comparative structure for further study.

Treatment strategies for skin disorders also differ between veterinary and human medicine. Veterinary treatments often prioritize symptomatic relief and prevention, while human dermatological care may involve a broader range of targeted pharmaceutical options. Comparative analysis of these treatment methodologies could lead to the development of new therapies beneficial to both fields, as discussed in Microbiological Research into skin health.

By emphasizing the comparative aspects of dermatology, researchers can contribute to a deeper understanding of skin health across species. This field underscores the importance of genetic research, environmental studies, and treatment innovations, as evidenced by ongoing research in dermatological and veterinary science.

== Therapies ==
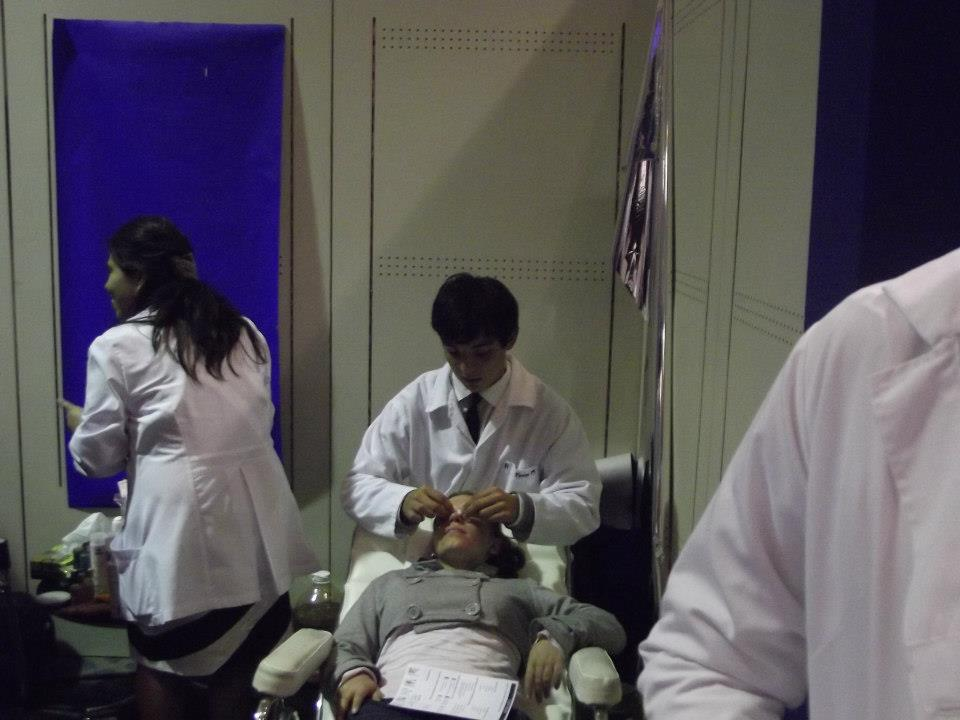
Facial cleansing pores in Meditec at ITESM CCM (2012)

Therapies provided by dermatologists include:

- Excision and treatment of skin cancer
- Cryosurgery for the treatment of warts, skin cancers, and other dermatoses
- Cosmetic filler injections
- Intralesional treatment with steroid drugs or chemotherapy
- Laser therapy for the management of birth marks, skin disorders (like vitiligo), tattoo removal, and cosmetic resurfacing and rejuvenation
- Chemical peels for the treatment of acne, melasma, and sun damage
- Photodynamic therapy for the treatment of skin cancer and precancerous growths
- Phototherapy including the use of narrowband UVB, broadband UVB, psoralen, and UVB
- Tumescent liposuction: Invented by a gynecologist, a dermatologist (Jeffrey A. Klein) adapted the procedure to local infusion of dilute anesthetic called tumescent liposuction. This method is now widely practiced by dermatologists, plastic surgeons, and gynecologists.
- Radiation therapy, although rarely practiced by dermatologists, some continue to provide it in their offices.
- Vitiligo surgery includes procedures such as autologous melanocyte transplant, suction blister grafting, and punch grafting.
- Allergy testing uses "patch" testing for contact dermatitis.
- Systemic therapies include antibiotics, immunomodulators, and novel injectable products.
- Topical therapies use many of the numerous products and compounds used topically.

Most dermatologic pharmacology can be categorized based on the Anatomical Therapeutic Chemical (ATC) classification system, specifically the ATC code D.

== See also ==
- Dermatologic surgical procedure
- Skin condition
- History of dermatology
- List of skin conditions
- List of dermatologists
- Centro Studi GISED
- Dermaordinology
- Skin line
