= Bezold =

Bezold is a surname, and may refer to:

- Albert von Bezold (1836–1868), German physiologist
  - Bezold–Jarisch reflex
- Carl Bezold (1859–1922), German orientalist
- Clement Bezold, founder of the Institute for Alternative Futures
- Dave Bezold (born 1965), American college basketball coach
- Friedrich Bezold (1842–1908), German otologist
  - Bezold's abscess
- Michael Bezold (born 1972), German chess player
- Wilhelm von Bezold (1837–1907), German physicist and meteorologist
  - Bezold–Brücke shift (luminance-on-hue effect)
  - Bezold effect, an optical illusion

== See also ==
- Don Betzold (born 1950), American politician
- Petzold
