= Urbach =

Urbach may refer to:

== Places ==
- Urbach, Baden-Württemberg, Germany
- Urbach, Rhineland-Palatinate, Germany
- Urbach, Thuringia, Germany
- Urbach, village in Moselle, France, which is the burial site of J. F. Oberlin
- Urbach, a valley in Oberhasli, Switzerland

== People with the surname ==
- Eithan Urbach (born 1977), Israeli swimmer
- Ephraim Urbach (1912–91), Israeli author and scholar of Judaism
- Erich Urbach (1893–1946), Austrian dermatologist
- Hinko Urbach (1872–1960), Czech-born rabbi who relocated to Yugoslavia
- Karina Urbach, German historian
- Nafa Urbach (born 1980), Indonesian singer, actress and model
- Peter Urbach (1940–2011), German intelligence informant and agent provocateur

== See also ==
- Urbach–Wiethe disease, a rare recessive genetic disorder, named after Erich Urbach and Camillo Wiethe
