= Von Bezold =

Von Bezold may refer to:

- Albert von Bezold (1836–1868), German physiologist
- Wilhelm von Bezold (1837–1907), German physicist

== See also ==
- Bezold
