= Lipoid =

Lipoid may refer to:

- Lipid, a fatlike substance
- Lipoid proteinosis, also known as Urbach–Wiethe disease
