= Siebenmann =

Siebenmann is a surname. Notable people with the name include:

- Friedrich Siebenmann (otolaryngologist) (1852–1928), Swiss otolaryngologist
- Friedrich Siebenmann (trade unionist) (1851–1901), Swiss trade unionist
- Laurent C. Siebenmann (born 1939), Canadian Mathematician

== See also ==
- Kirby–Siebenmann class, in mathematics
