= Petzold =

Petzold (or Petzoldt, Pezold and Pezolt) is a German surname. Notable people with the surnames include:

- August Georg Wilhelm Pezold (1794–1859), Baltic-German painter and lithographer
- Barbara Petzold (born 1955), East German cross-country skier
- Charles Petzold (born 1953), American programmer and technical author
- Christian Petzold (composer) (1677–1733), German composer and organist
- Christian Petzold (director) (born 1960), German film director
- Eduard Petzold (1815–1891), German landscape gardener
- Georg Pezolt (1810–1878), Austrian painter, architect and art critic
- Gertrude von Petzold (1876–1952), Unitarian minister
- Guillaume-Lebrecht Petzold (1794–?), French piano maker
- Harald Petzold (born 1962), German politician
- Klaus Petzold, German handballer
- Konrad Petzold (1930–1999), German film director, writer and actor
- Joachim Petzold (1913–1991), major in the Luftwaffe
- Johann Christoph Petzold (1708–1762), German sculptor
- Johann Christoph Pezel (also Petzold) (1639–1694), German violinist, trumpeter, and composer
- Joseph Petzoldt (1862–1929), German philosopher
- Larry Pezold (1893–1957), American baseball player
- Linda Petzold (born 1954), computer scientist and mechanical engineer
- Maik Petzold (born 1978), Germany triathlon athlete
- Martin Petzold (1955–2023), German tenor
- Martin Petzoldt (1946–2015), German theologian and Bach scholar
- Paul Petzoldt (1908–1999), American mountaineer
- Richard Petzoldt (1907–1974), German musicologist and music critic
- Walter von Pezold (1882–1955), Estonian-German politician

== See also ==
- Bezold
