= Jarisch–Herxheimer reaction =

Herxheimer reaction
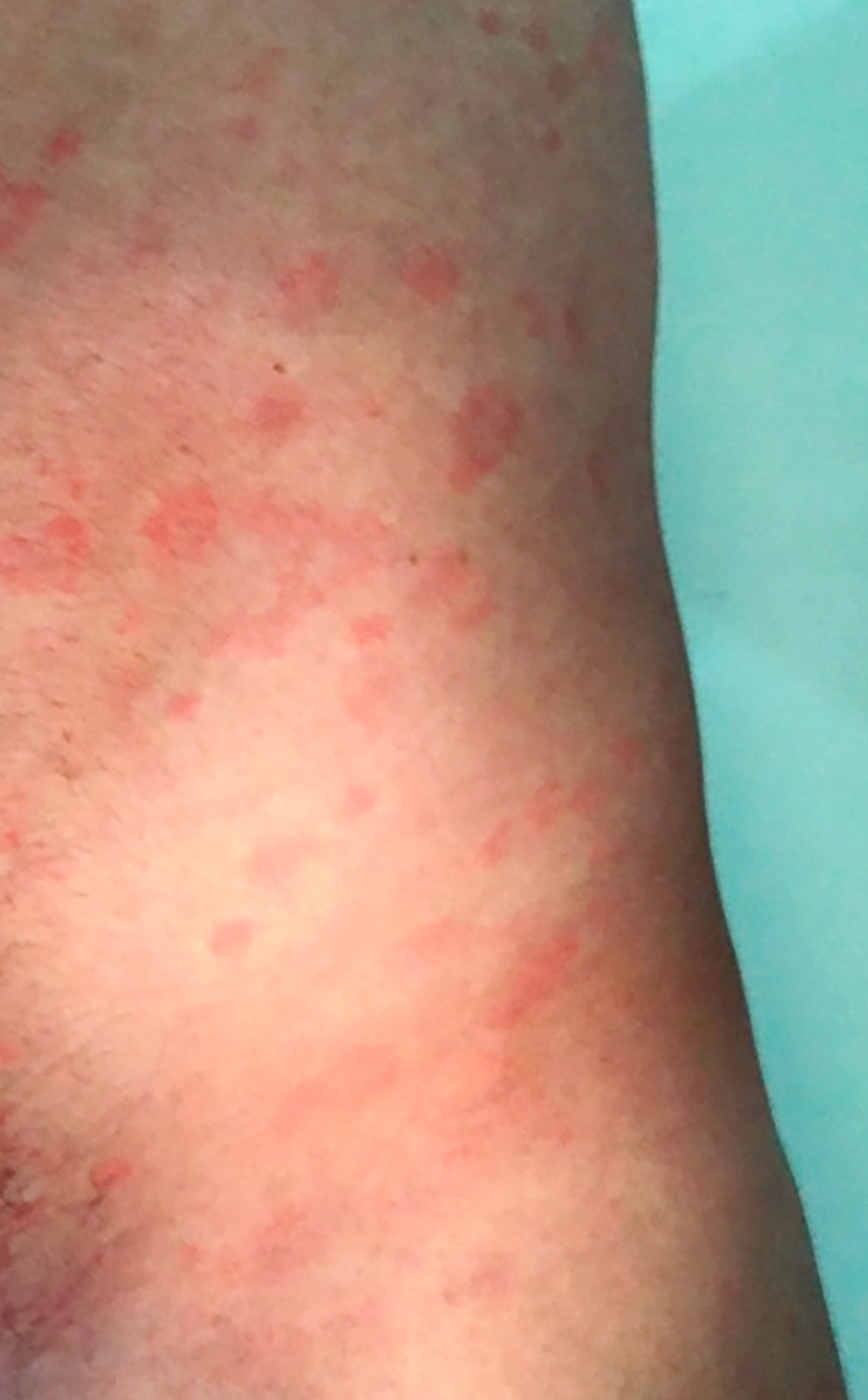
- Jarisch–Herxheimer reaction in a patient with syphilis and HIV infection
- Pronunciation: English: /ˌjærɪʃ ˈhɛərkshaɪmər/ YARR-ish HAIRKS-hy-mər
- Specialty: Infectious disease

A Jarisch–Herxheimer reaction is a sudden and typically transient reaction that may occur within 24 hours of being administered antibiotics for an infection by a spirochete, including syphilis, leptospirosis, Lyme disease, and relapsing fever. Signs and symptoms include fever, chills, shivers, malaise, headache, fast heart beat, low blood pressure, breathing fast, flushing of skin, muscle aches, and worsening of skin lesions. It may sometimes be mistaken as an allergy to the antibiotic. Jarisch–Herxheimer reactions are usually self-limiting but severe presentations can be life-threatening if they cause a significant drop in blood pressure and cause acute end-organ injury, eventually leading to multi-organ failure.

== Signs and symptoms ==
A Jarisch–Herxheimer reaction usually manifests in 1–3 hours after the first dose of antibiotics as fever, chills, rigor, hypotension, headache, tachycardia, hyperventilation, vasodilation with flushing, myalgia (muscle pain), exacerbation of skin lesions and anxiety. The intensity of the reaction indicates the severity of inflammation. Reaction commonly occurs within two hours of drug administration, but is usually self-limiting.

Jarisch–Herxheimer reactions may present with similar symptoms to conditions such as allergic reaction and sepsis. Compared to sepsis, recovery from Jarisch–Herxheimer reaction tends to be much more rapid and rarely requires interventions such as vasopressors to increase blood pressure.

== Causes ==
The Jarisch–Herxheimer reaction is traditionally associated with antimicrobial treatment of syphilis. The reaction is also seen in the other diseases caused by spirochetes: Lyme disease, relapsing fever, and leptospirosis. There have been case reports of the Jarisch–Herxheimer reaction accompanying treatment of other infections, including Q fever, bartonellosis, brucellosis, trichinellosis, and African trypanosomiasis.

== Pathophysiology ==
Lipoproteins released from treatment of Treponema pallidum infections are believed to induce the Jarisch–Herxheimer reaction. The Herxheimer reaction has shown an increase in inflammatory cytokines during the period of exacerbation, including tumor necrosis factor alpha, interleukin-6 and interleukin-8.

== Treatments ==
Prophylaxis and treatment with an anti-inflammatory agent may stop progression of the reaction. Oral aspirin or ibuprofen every four hours for a day or 60 mg of prednisone orally or intravenously has been used as an adjunctive treatment. However, steroids are generally of no benefit. Patients must be closely monitored for the potential complications (collapse and shock) and may require IV fluids to maintain adequate blood pressure. If available, meptazinol, an opioid analgesic of the mixed agonist/antagonist type, should be administered to reduce the severity of the reaction. Anti TNF-α may also be effective.

== History ==
Both Adolf Jarisch, an Austrian dermatologist, and Karl Herxheimer, a German dermatologist, are credited with the discovery of the Jarisch–Herxheimer reaction. Both Jarisch and Herxheimer observed reactions in patients with syphilis treated with mercury. The reaction was first seen following treatment in early and later stages of syphilis treated with Salvarsan, mercury, or antibiotics. Jarisch thought that the reaction was caused by a toxin released from the dying spirochetes.

== See also ==
- Jarisch-Bezold reflex
- Immune reconstitution inflammatory syndrome, another systemic inflammatory syndrome that arises after antimicrobial treatment
