= Friedrich Siebenmann =

Friedrich Siebenmann is the name of:

- Friedrich Siebenmann (otolaryngologist) (1852–1928), Swiss otolaryngologist
- Friedrich Siebenmann (trade unionist) (1851-1901), Swiss trade unionist
