= Eduard Lipp =

Austrian dermatologist

Eduard Lipp (20 February 1831, in Wundschuh – 30 December 1891, in Graz) was a dermatologist from the Austro-Hungarian Empire.

He studied medicine at the University of Vienna, receiving his doctorate in 1856. In 1861, he became a primary physician at the Allgemeine Krankenhaus in Graz. In 1865 he obtained his habilitation for dermatology and syphilology, and with support from the government, conducted investigations of mercury poisoning affecting miners in Idria. In 1873 he became an associate professor at the University of Graz as well as director of the Allgemeine Krankenhaus. In 1874 he was appointed chair of the newly founded dermatology clinic in Graz.

From 1867 to 1870 he served on the municipal council in Graz, and in 1870 was elected to the Styrian parliament. In 1890/91 he served as president of the Deutsche Dermatologische Gesellschaft (German Dermatological Society). He died on 30 December 1891 from a carcinoma of the esophagus; his successor at the University of Graz being Adolf Jarisch.

In the field of dermatology, he authored papers on topics such as psoriasis, erythema multiforme, varicella, pemphigus vegetans and pemphigus conjunctiva.
