= Hinko =

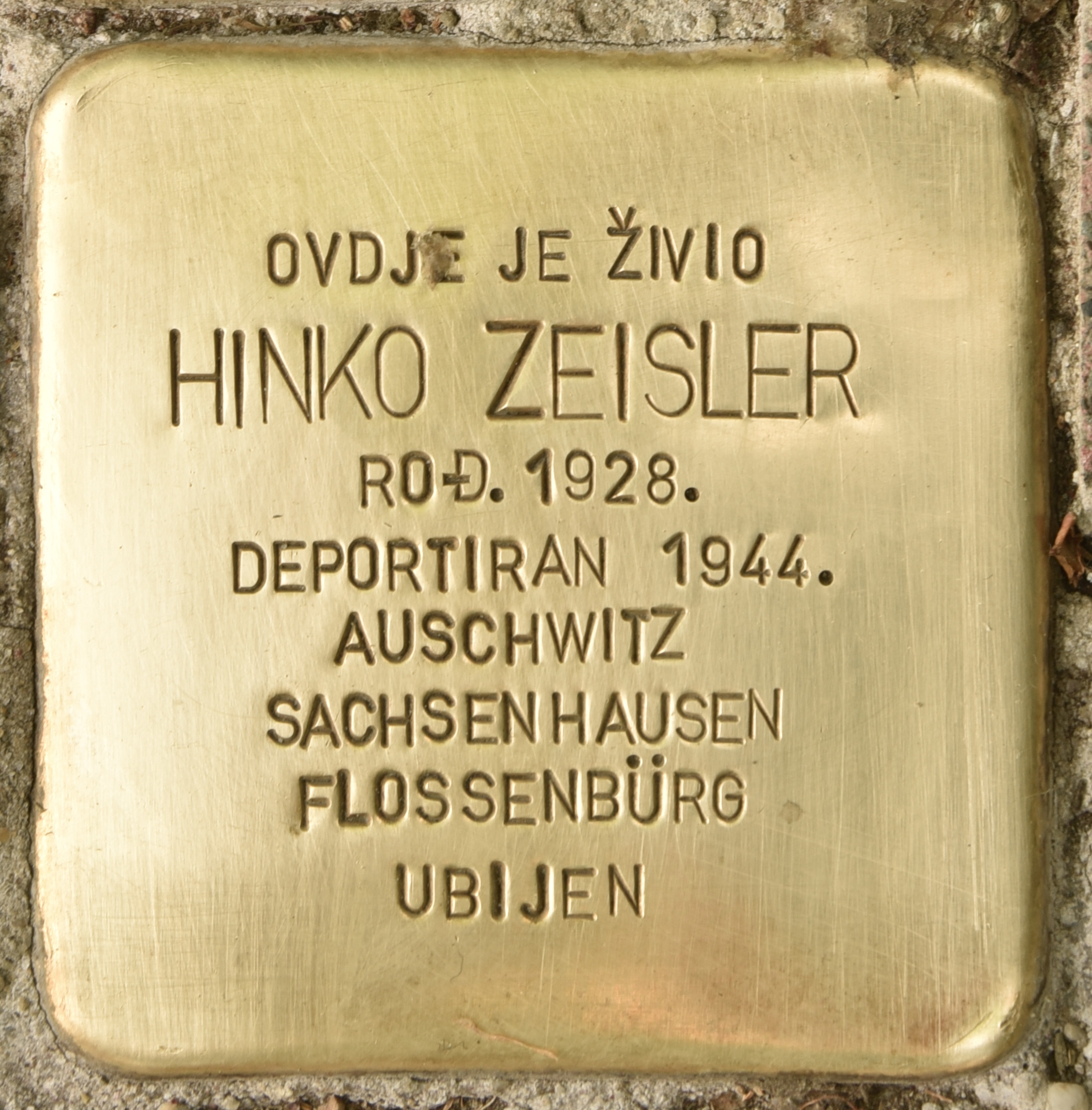
Memorial plaque for Hinko Zeisler, a victim of Nazi persecution killed at Auschwitz death camp

Hinko is a Croatian masculine given name. Notable people with this name include:

- Hinko Bauer (1908–1986), Croatian Jewish architect
- Hinko Hinković (1854–1929), Croatian lawyer, publisher and politician
- Hinko Juhn (1891–1940), Croatian Jewish sculptor
- Hinko Picilli, Croatian Ustaše commander (Jasenovac concentration camp)
- Hinko Urbach (1872–1960), Zagreb Chief Rabbi
- Hinko Wurth, first president of the Yugoslav Tennis Association
- Diana Hinko (born 1943), Austrian pair skater
