= Camillo Wiethe =

Austrian otorhinolaryngologist

Camillo Wiethe (24 May 1889, Vienna – 10 July 1949, Vienna) was an Austrian otorhinolaryngologist.

He received his medical doctorate from the University of Vienna in 1913, and later served as a front-line physician during World War I. From 1918 to 1936, he was a physician at the clinic for otorhinolaryngology in Vienna, and in the meantime qualified as a university lecturer (1933). From 1936 to 1938, he was head of the department for otorhinolaryngology at Merchant's Hospital (Wiener Kaufmannschaft), and from 1938 to 1945 maintained a private practice on the Reichsratsstraße. In 1945 he became an associate professor and director of the second university clinic for otorhinolaryngology in Vienna.

With Austrian dermatologist Erich Urbach, he described a rare, congenital lipoid storage disease that was to become known as Urbach–Wiethe disease. In 1955 the thoroughfare Wiethestraße (Vienna) was named in his honor.

== Bibliography ==
- Kongenitale diffuse Hyalinablagerungen in den oberen Luftwegen. Familiärer auftretend. In: Zeitschrift für Hals-, Nasen- und Ohrenheilkunde, 1924, 10: 369–362.
- Lipoidosis cutis et mucosae; In: Virchows Archiv für pathologische Anatomie und Physiologie und für klinische Medizin, 1929, 273: 285–319; (with Erich Urbach).
