= Extracellular matrix protein 1 =

Protein found in humans

ECM1

Identifiers
- Aliases: ECM1, URBWD, extracellular matrix protein 1
- External IDs: OMIM: 602201; MGI: 103060; GeneCards: ECM1

Gene location (Human)
| Chr. | Chromosome 1 (human) |
| Band | 1q21.2 | Start | 150,508,062 bp |
| Band | 1q21.2 | End | 150,513,789 bp |

Gene location (Mouse)
| Chr. | Chromosome 3 (mouse) |
| Band | 3 F2.1|3 40.91 cM | Start | 95,641,459 bp |
| Band | 3 F2.1|3 40.91 cM | End | 95,646,881 bp |
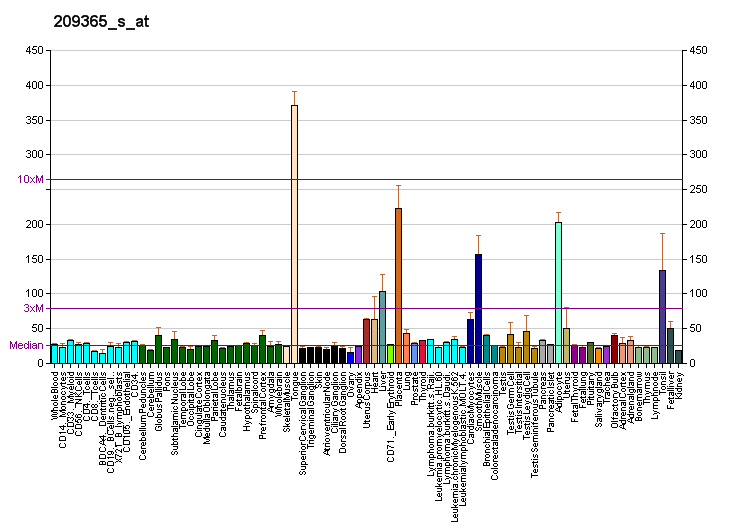
RNA expression pattern
| Bgee | Human / Mouse (ortholog); Top expressed in: buccal mucosa cell; mucosa of pharynx; stromal cell of endometrium; oral cavity; tail of epididymis; gallbladder; amniotic fluid; body of tongue; epithelium of esophagus; corpus epididymis / Top expressed in: esophagus; adrenal gland; urinary bladder; lip; zone of skin; white adipose tissue; human kidney; right kidney; liver; duodenum; More reference expression data |
| BioGPS | More reference expression data |
Gene ontology
| Molecular function | interleukin-2 receptor binding; signal transducer activity; protease binding; protein C-terminus binding; protein binding; enzyme binding; laminin binding |
| Cellular component | extracellular matrix; extracellular exosome; extracellular region; platelet dense granule lumen; extracellular space |
| Biological process | regulation of T cell migration; negative regulation of peptidase activity; negative regulation of bone mineralization; positive regulation of endothelial cell proliferation; ossification; regulation of bone mineralization; regulation of transcription by RNA polymerase II; biomineral tissue development; negative regulation of cytokine-mediated signaling pathway; positive regulation of angiogenesis; angiogenesis; positive regulation of I-kappaB kinase/NF-kappaB signaling; inflammatory response; regulation of type 2 immune response; platelet degranulation; signal transduction |
Sources:Amigo / QuickGO
Orthologs
| Databases | NCBI: entry; OMA: entry |
| Species | Human | Mouse |
| Entrez | 1893 | 13601 |
| Ensembl | ENSG00000143369 | ENSMUSG00000028108 |
| UniProt | Q16610 | Q61508 |
| RefSeq (mRNA) | NM_022664; NM_001202858; NM_004425 | NM_001252653; NM_007899; NM_001355070 |
| RefSeq (protein) | NP_001189787; NP_004416; NP_073155 | NP_001239582; NP_031925; NP_001341999 |
| Location (UCSC) | Chr 1: 150.51 – 150.51 Mb | Chr 3: 95.64 – 95.65 Mb |
| PubMed search |
- Wikidata
| View/Edit Human | View/Edit Mouse |

Extracellular matrix protein 1 is a protein that in humans is encoded by the ECM1 gene.

This gene encodes an extracellular protein containing motifs with a cysteine pattern characteristic of the cysteine pattern of the ligand-binding "double-loop" domains of the albumin protein family. This gene maps outside the epidermal differentiation complex (EDC), a cluster of three gene families involved in epidermal differentiation. Alternatively spliced transcript variants encoding distinct isoforms have been described.

== Diseases ==
ECM1 is implicated in breast cancer, thyroid cancer, hepatocellular carcinoma, and other cancers, and also in ulcerative colitis Germline mutations in ECM-1 cause the genetic disease lipoid proteinosis. Autoimmune attack on ECM-1 is responsible for lichen sclerosus. (see the Atlas of Genetics and Cytogenetics in Oncology and Haematology).

== See also ==
- Lipoid proteinosis
