= Adolf Jarisch =

Austrian dermatologist (1850–1902)

Adolf Jarisch (February 15, 1850 – March 21, 1902) was an dermatologist from the Austro-Hungarian Empire who specialized in the care of venereal disease. The Jarisch–Herxheimer reaction, an inflammatory response that he noted following treatment for syphilis, is partially named after him. Jarisch was the father of a noted pharmacologist, Adolf Jarisch Jr.

== Career ==
Born in Vienna, Jarisch studied medicine there and afterwards worked in the dermatology clinic of Ferdinand von Hebra. In 1888 he became an associate professor of dermatology and syphilology at the University of Innsbruck, and in 1892 succeeded Eduard Lipp as chair of the dermatology clinic at the University of Graz. In 1901 he attained a full professorship at Graz.

Jarisch is remembered for his work involving venereal disease. His name is lent to an inflammatory reaction to treatment of syphilis known as the Jarisch–Herxheimer reaction, named in conjunction with German-Jewish dermatologist Karl Herxheimer (1861–1942). Jarisch noticed unexpected illness and worsening of skin lesions in some syphilitic patients immediately after being treated with mercury. The patients would experience fever, nausea, and vomiting, and their lesions would worsen before eventually abating and healing. The illness could last as long as 2 to 3 days, which was followed by resolution of the skin lesions.

The Jarisch–Herxheimer reaction is also the name given to a reaction often precipitated by treatment of relapsing fevers. It usually begins within a few hours of the first dose and causes an initial rise in temperature, pulse rate and blood pressure, then followed by marked vasodilation and sweating, which can result in shock.

== Family ==
His son, Adolf Jr. (1891–1965), was a pharmacologist. The Bezold–Jarisch reflex, a cardiovascular decompressor reflex, is named after Adolf Jr. and physiologist Albert von Bezold (1836–1868).

== Written works ==
Among his numerous publications is Die Hautkrankheiten, an influential book on skin disorders that was included in Carl Nothnagel's Handbuch der speciellen Pathologie und Therapie. Other publications by Jarisch include:

- Lupus vulgaris, 1890 – treatise on Lupus vulgaris.
- Demonstration eines Falles von Summer Eruption, 1896
- Demonstration von Psorospermien der Darierschen Dermatose, 1896 – Demonstration of Psorospermia in regards to Darier's dermatosis.
- Vorstellung eines Falles von Hydrocystoma, 1896 – Presentation of a case of hidrocystoma.
