= Johann Fischbach =

Austrian painter (1797–1871)

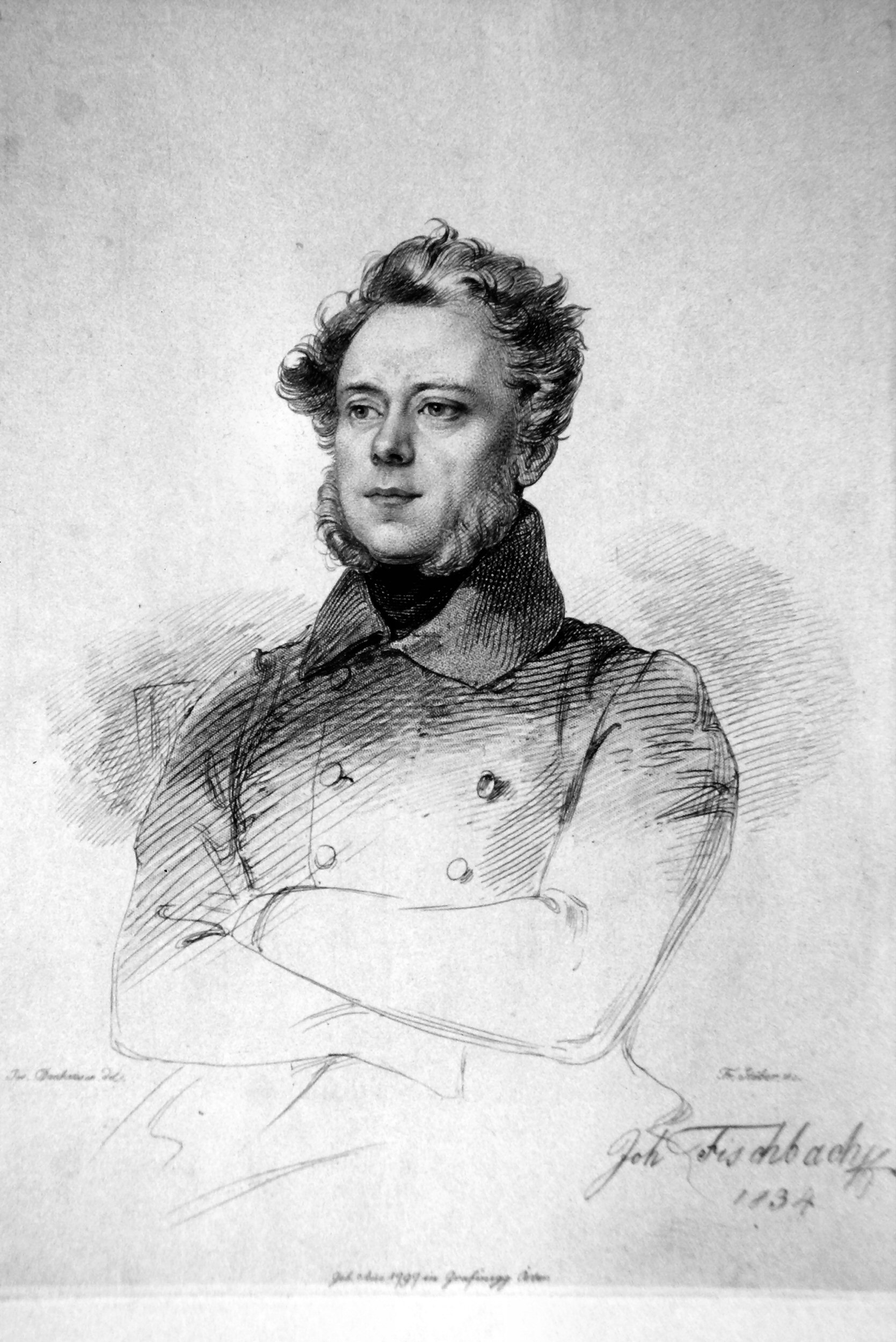
Johann Fischbach, engraving by Franz Xaver Stöber, after a painting by Josef Danhauser (1834)

Johann (Franz) Fischbach (5 April 1797 in Grafenegg – 19 June 1871 in Munich) was an Austrian painter.

== Life ==
He was the son of one of Count Breunerschen's stewards. His art studies began at the Academy of Fine Arts Vienna, where he studied under Joseph Mössmer (1780–1845) and won the Grand Prize for landscape painting in 1821. He moved to Salzburg in 1840 and set up a studio there. He was also instrumental in creating the Salzburg Art Society and a small Academy that numbered Josef Mayburger and Hans Makart's father among its students.

In 1851, he built his own villa (Swiss chalet style) in Aigen. It is still known as the Fischbachvilla. After the early death of his son August, who had shown great promise, he became deeply depressed and spent the last decade of his life in Munich, away from anything that might be a sad reminder of happier days.

Together with Moritz von Schwind and Ludwig Richter, he is considered one of the most important representatives of the Austrian Biedermeier style. Landscapes were his speciality, but he also produced genre art, portraits, vedute and still lifes.

== Selected works ==
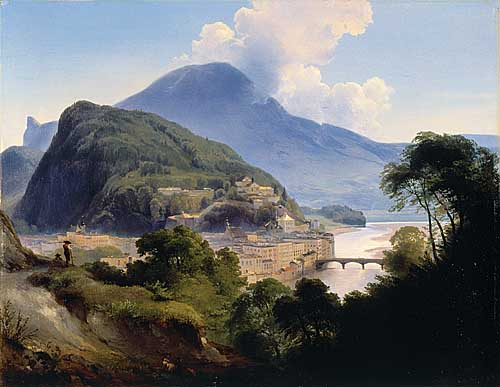
View of Salzburg with the Kapuzinerberg (1844)

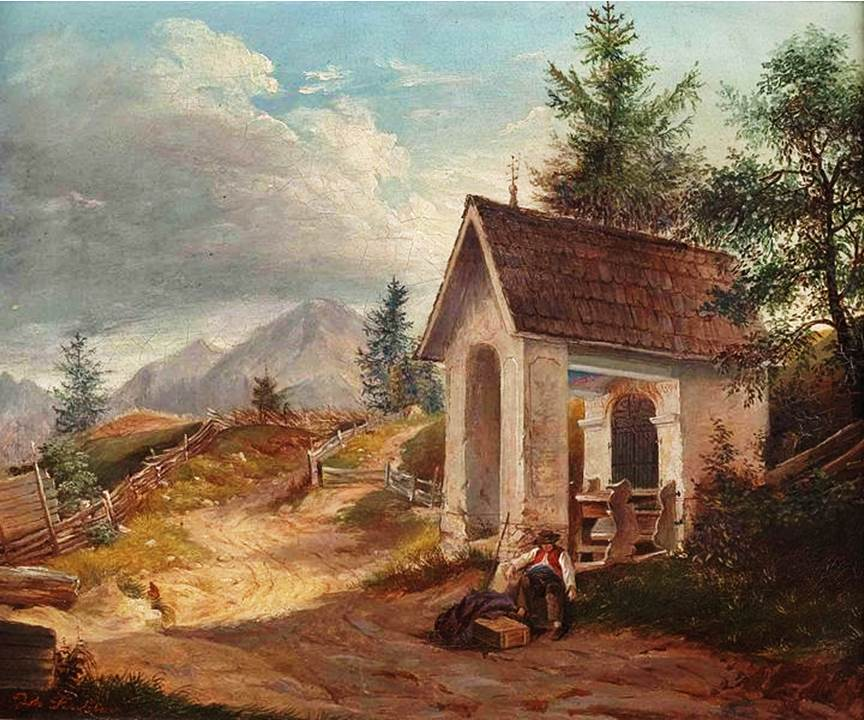
Resting in Front of the chapel (1871)

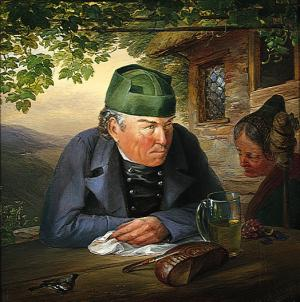
Vesper Bread (1831)

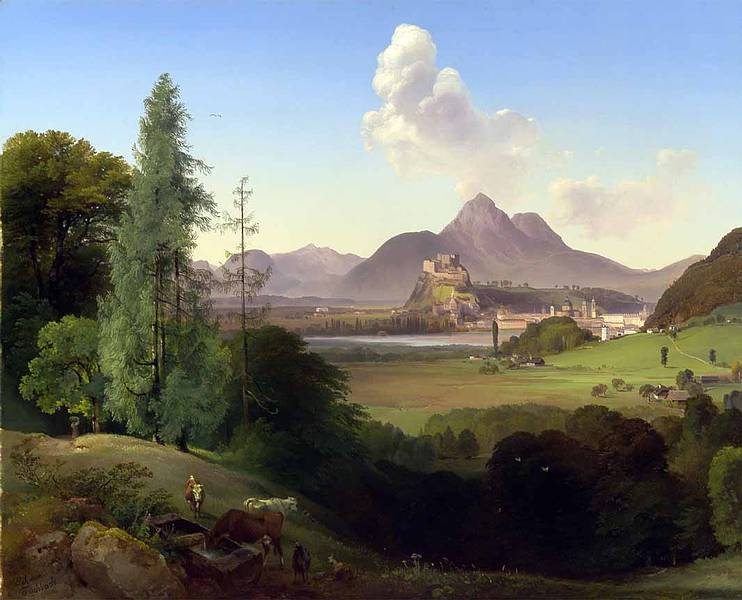
Salzburg (1850)
