= Deutsche Dermatologische Gesellschaft =

German Dermatological Society

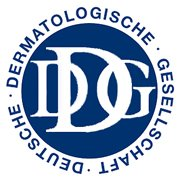
Logo of Deutschen Dermatologischen Gesellschaft

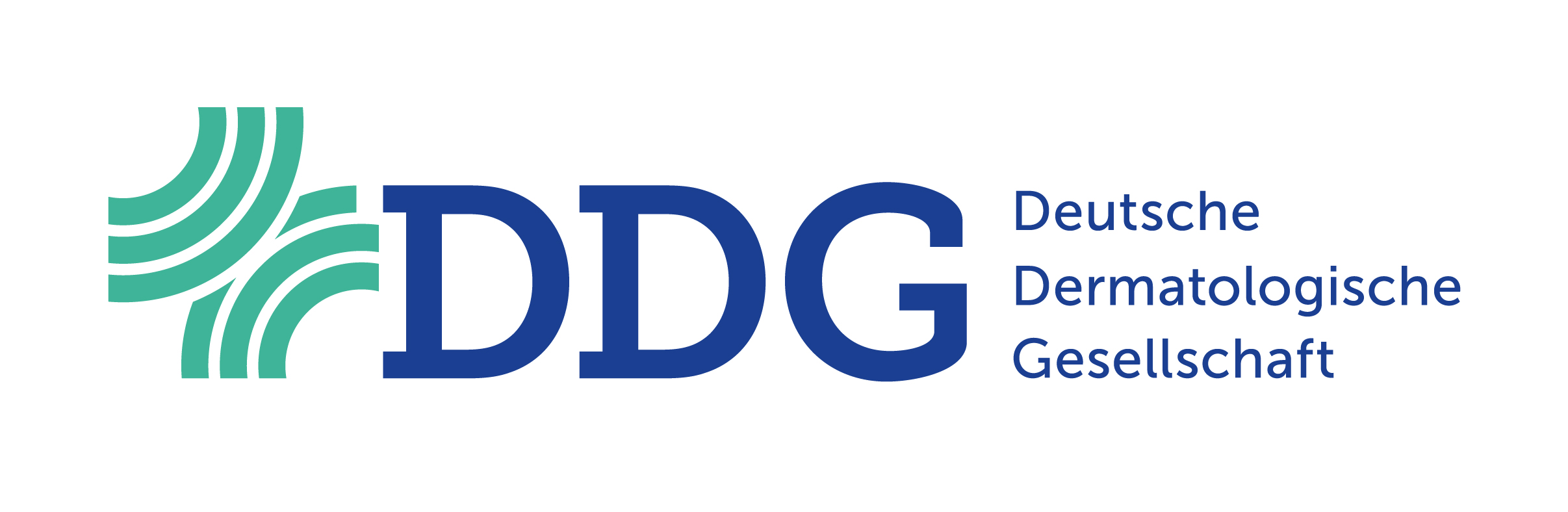
Logo of the German Society of Dermatology

The Deutsche Dermatologische Gesellschaft e.V. (DDG, German Dermatological Society; "e.V." meaning "registered association") is a scientific specialized society for dermatology in Germany. It is a member of the Association of Scientific Medical Societies in Germany (AWMF).

== Purpose ==
The aim is the promotion of scientific and professional concerns of dermatology, venereology and allergology and the support of specialization areas in dermatology, andrology, phlebology, and lymphology, proctology, operative dermatology and dermatooncology, dermatological radiotherapy, dermatological microbiology, occupational and environmental dermatology, and dermahistology, as well as prevention and rehabilitation. The DDG also operates as advisor for German and international governments and authorities, public and non-public organizations, medical and scientific societies, institutions, clinics, and individuals in scientific and professional quests. It was founded in 1889 in Prague and comprises almost 3,600 full and associated members. The society is based in Berlin, where they operate a joint office with the BVDD, Berufsverband der Deutschen Dermatologen (Professional Association of Germany's dermatologists). In 1998 these two organizations founded the DDA, Deutsche Dermatologische Akademie (German dermatological academy), which is committed to the continued and advanced education of dermatologists.

== Working groups ==
The DDG employs several different working groups which are dedicated to the science of specific topics and publish recommendations and guidelines. Among these working groups are:

- Pediatric Dermatology
- Dermatological Oncology
- Dermatological Prevention
- Dermatological Angiology
- Occupational and Environmental Dermatology
- Aesthetical Dermatology and Cosmetology
- Photodermatology
- Health Economy and Evidence-based Medicine of the DDG
- Dermatological Research
- Dermatological Histology
- Wound healing
- Dermatological Infectiology and Dermatology of the Tropics
- History of Dermatology and Venereology
- Rehabilitation in Dermatology
- Working group Pruritus Research
- Andrology
- Dermatological Diagnosis index (extensions of ICD-10 for Dermatology)
- Psychosomatic Dermatology

== Cooperation ==
The DDG is an association of German-speaking dermatologists and therefore collaborates closely with the dermatological professional societies of Austria (ÖGDV) and Switzerland (SGDV). It is also a member of the International League of Dermatological Societies (ILDS), the international umbrella organization of all scientific professional societies in the field of dermatology. The DDG also is represented in the European Academy of Dermatology and Venereology (EADV), the European Dermatology Forum (EDF), the European Society Dermatological Research (ESDR), and the Union of European Union Medical Specialists (UEMS).

== Publications and work ==
The publication organ of the DDG is the magazine Journal der Deutschen Dermatologischen Gesellschaft (ISSN 1610-0387), published by Wiley Online Library, and the society awards different scientific prizes, such as "Deutschen Neurodermitis Preis", "Deutschen Psoriasis Preis", "Oscar-Gans-Preis" etc. and grants research fellowships.

Commemorating the 70th anniversary of the death of Karl Herxheimer, who was a Jewish dermatologist from Frankfurt am Main in Nazi Germany, the society organized a Karl Herxheimer commemoration lecture on 6 December 2012 and set up a memorial stone in the Jewish graveyard in Frankfurt.

The award of the Karl Herxheimer Medal is the highest honor in German dermatology. It is given to outstanding scholars in the field of dermatovenerology in memory of the great doctor, teacher and researcher Karl Herxheimer.
