= Franz Xaver Stöber =

Austrian engraver and etcher (1795–1858)

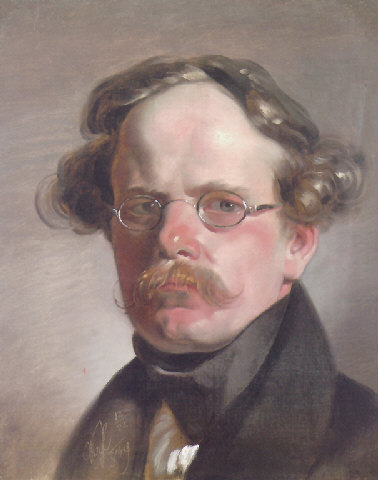
Portrait of Stöber by Karl Vogl, after Friedrich von Amerling (1839)

Franz Xaver Stöber (20 February 1795, Vienna – 11 April 1858, Vienna) was an Austrian engraver and etcher.

== Life and work ==
He began his studies with his father, who was also an engraver, and continued at the Academy of Fine Arts Vienna. In 1815, he first attracted attention with his engravings of mythological scenes. He later turned to experimenting with new techniques and became the first steel engraver in Austria. In 1829, he was awarded a patent for a method of printing in color on steel or copper plates. In 1835, he became a member of the Academy and, beginning in 1844, taught engraving there. He was also a Commander of the Vienna Academic Corps and Director of the Vienna Artists' Pensions Institute.

His total output came to approximately 2,500 engravings, which include everything from full-sized portraits to book-sized vignettes. He was also an avid collector of early tin cans (which were luxury items, etched with portraits as gifts or awards) and possessed over 500 rare examples.

In 1877, a street in Margareten was named the Stöbergasse in his honor.

== Selected portraits ==
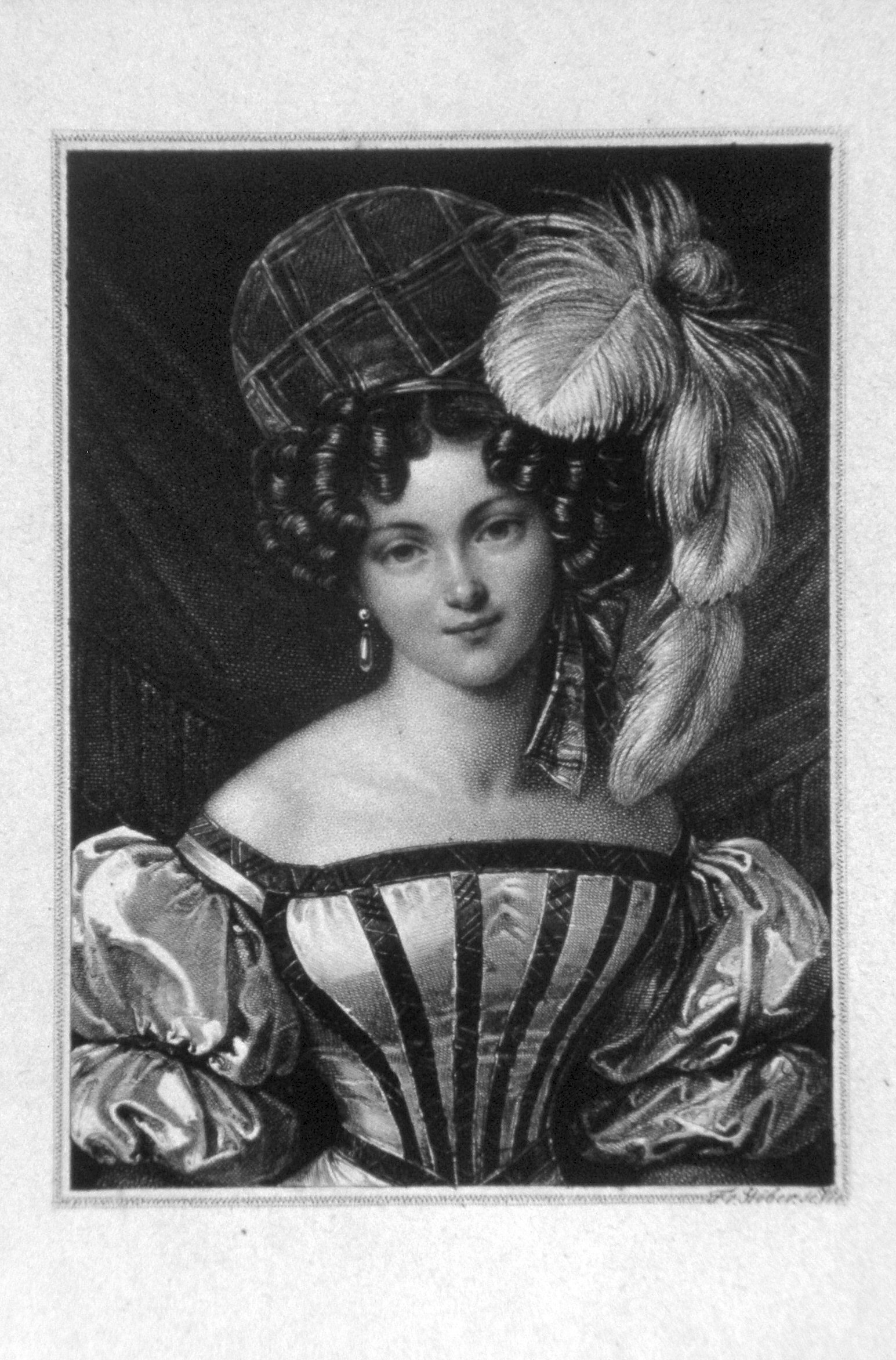
Henriette Sontag

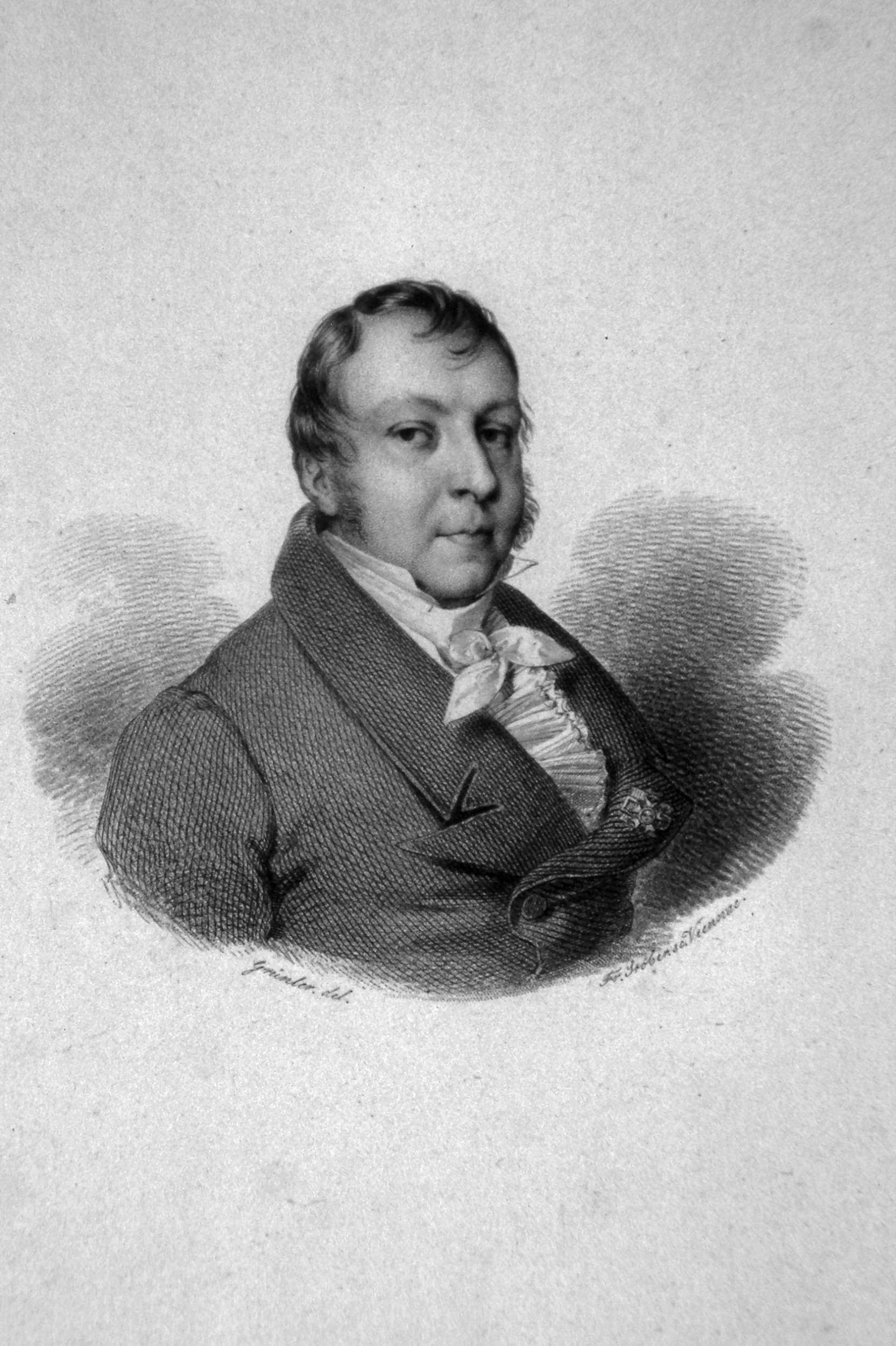
Johann Nepomuk Hummel

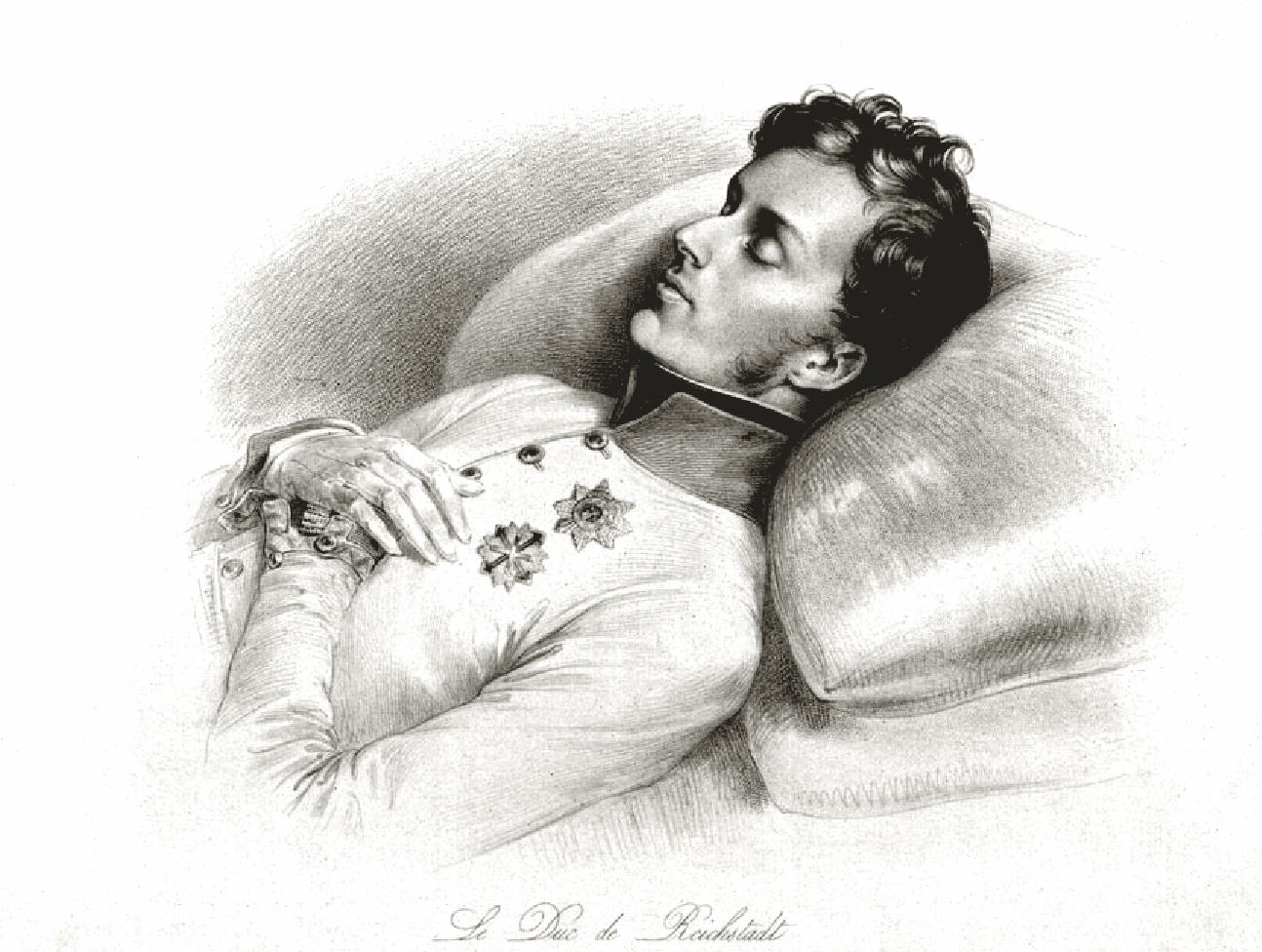
Napoleon II on his deathbed

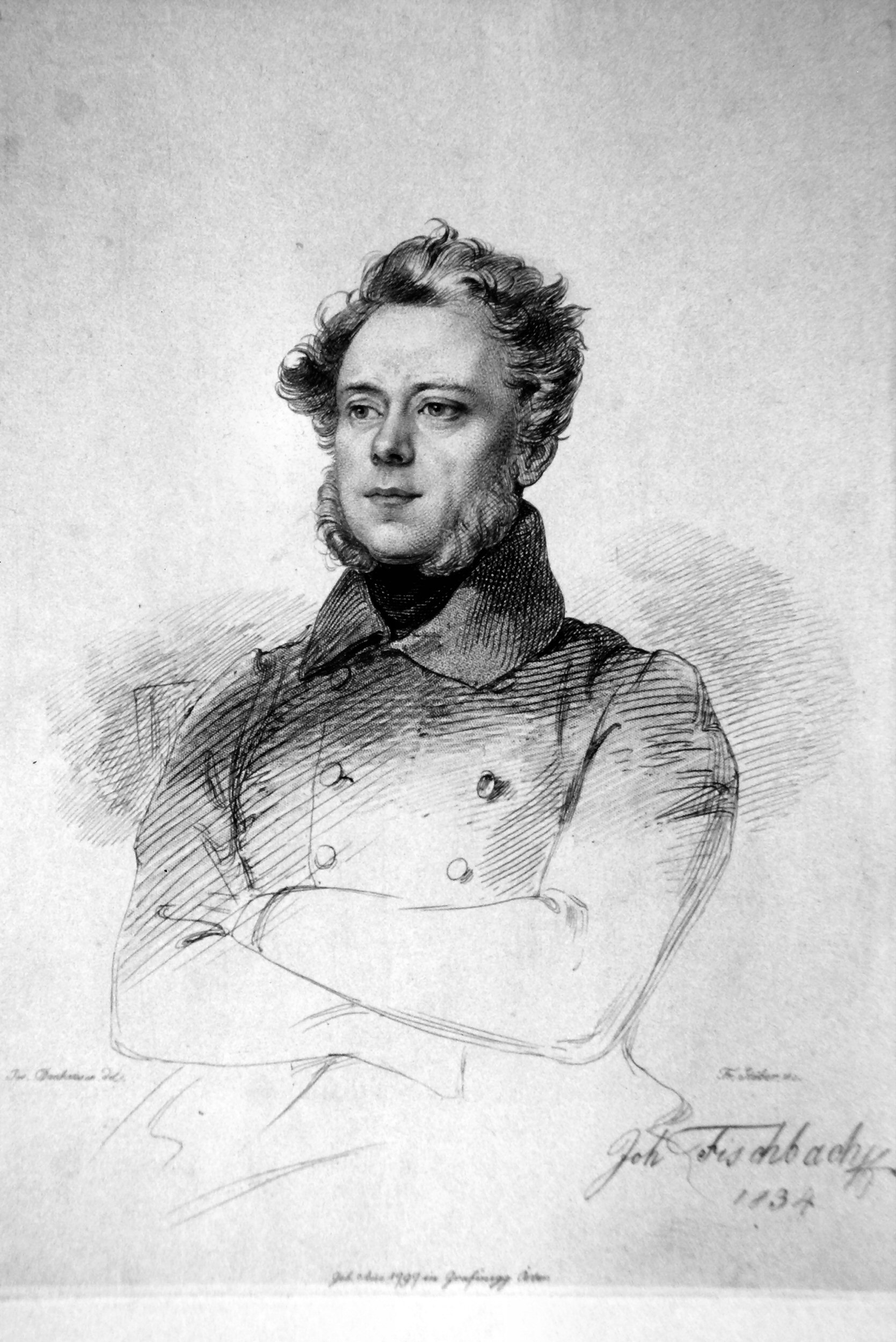
Johann Fischbach

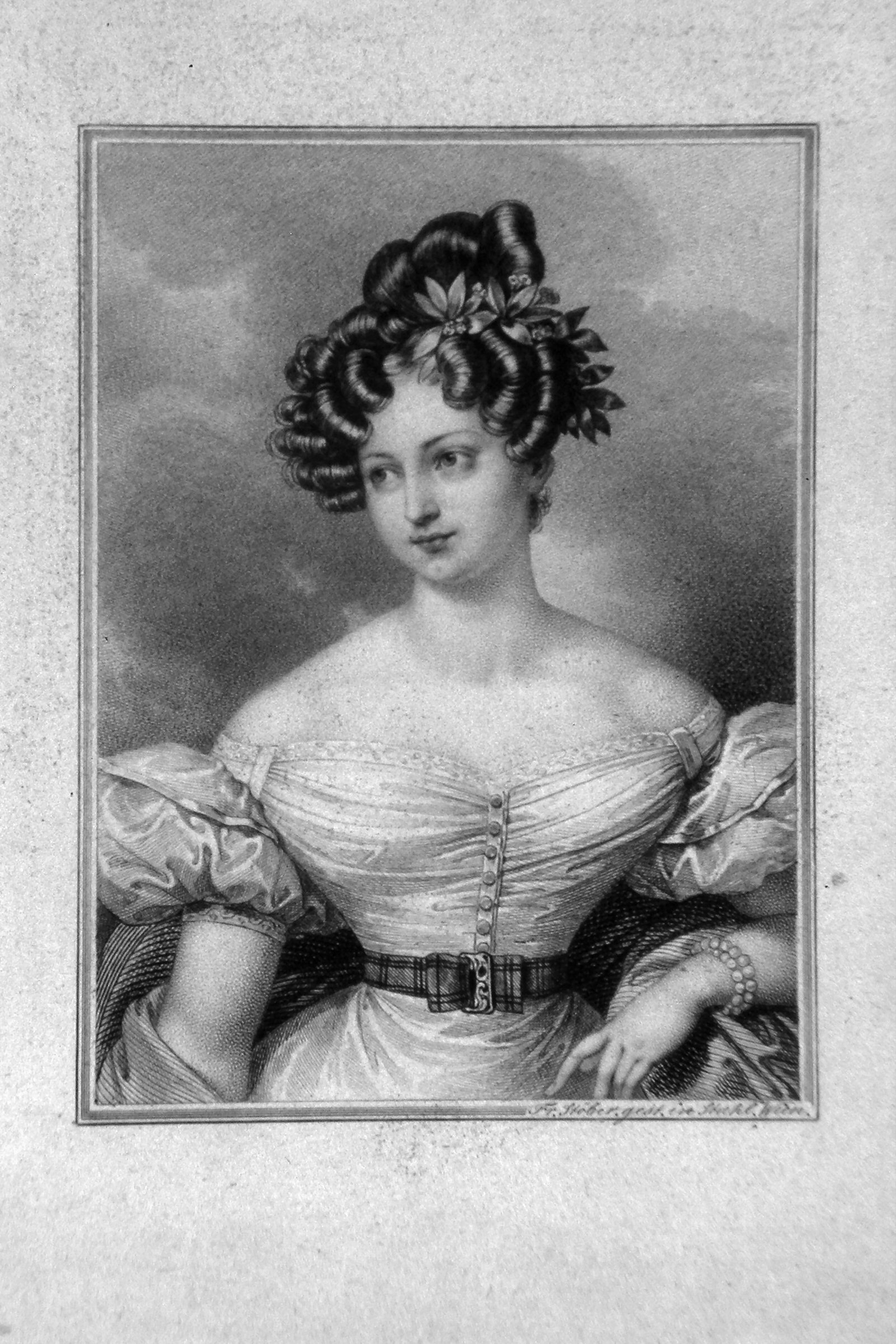
Caroline Bauer

== Sources ==
- Constantin von Wurzbach: Stöber, Franz. In: Biographisches Lexikon des Kaiserthums Oesterreich. Vol.39, Verlag L. C. Zamarski, Vienna 1879, pp. 75–85.
- Karl Weiß: Stöber, Franz. In: Allgemeine Deutsche Biographie (ADB). Vol.36, Duncker & Humblot, Leipzig 1893, p. 274.
- C. Reiter: "Stöber, Franz Xav.". In: Österreichisches Biographisches Lexikon 1815–1950 (ÖBL). Vol. 13, Austrian Academy of Sciences, Vienna 2010, ISBN 978-3-7001-6963-5, p. 282.
- Thieme, Becker: Allgemeines Lexikon der Bildenden Künstler von der Antike bis zur Gegenwart; with Vollmer: Allgemeinem Lexikon der bildenden Künstler des XX. Jahrhunderts. Leipzig 2008, ISBN 978-3-86502-177-9.
