= Josef Mayburger =

Austrian painter (1814–1908)

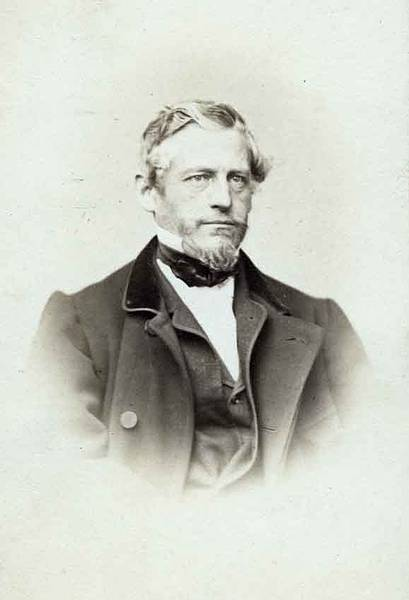
Mayburger in c. 1866

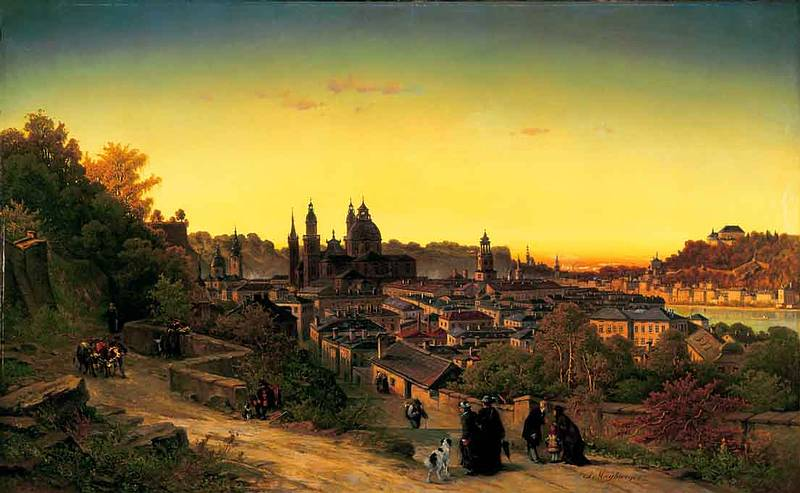
Salzburg at Sunset (c. 1870)

Josef Michael Mayburger (30 March 1814 – 2 November 1908) was an Austrian painter, teacher and local politician.

== Life ==
He was born on 30 March 1814 in Straßwalchen. He was the son of a schoolmaster and grew up in the shadow of the Napoleonic Wars. His mother died in childbirth in 1822, then his father and stepmother died in 1828, so he went to live with his godfather, a local merchant. He still managed to attend teaching seminars in Salzburg and serve a business apprenticeship. Later, he became a teacher and, eventually, a Professor at the real school. From 1862 to 1869, he served as a member of the Salzburg City Council, where he was known for his advocacy of historic preservation.

He studied painting with Johann Fischbach and Georg Pezolt. In his later years, as a landscape painter, he became known for his precise lines and use of lighting effects. A city beautification society he founded in 1862 still exists today as the "Stadtverein Salzburg". He continued to be active in civic affairs until his death. He died on 2 November 1908 in Salzburg. In 1924, the lower right bank of the Salzach River was named the "Josef Mayburger Quay".
