= Friedrich Siebenmann (otolaryngologist) =

Swiss otolaryngologist

Friedrich Siebenmann (22 May 1852, in Uerkheim – 4 April 1928, in Basel) was a Swiss otolaryngologist.

From 1871, he studied at the University of Zurich, the University of Würzburg, and the University of Bern, and afterwards worked as a physician in the communities of Muri and Brugg. He furthered his education in otology and laryngology at the University of Vienna, the University of Breslau, and the Ludwig-Maximilians-Universität München, and in 1888 obtained his habilitation. In 1892, he became an associate professor for otolaryngology at the University of Basel, and from 1896 to 1922 served as director of the otolaryngology clinic at Basel municipal hospital.

He is best remembered for anatomical research of the inner ear and for studies involving the pathology of deafness. In 1908, he was the first physician to describe lipoid proteinosis, a disorder also known as Urbach–Wiethe disease.

== Selected works ==
- Die fadenpilze, aspergillus flavus, niger u. fumigatus; eurotium repens (u. aspergillus glaucus) und ihre beziehungen zur otomycosis aspergillina, 1883 – The filamentous fungi, Aspergillus flavus, niger and fumigatus; Eurotium repens (Aspergillus glaucus) and their relationships to otomycosis.
- Die Korrosions-Anatomie des knöchernen Labyrinthes des menschlichen ohres, 1890 – The corrosive anatomy of the bony labyrinth of the human ear.
- Die Blutgefässe im Labyrinth des menschlichen Ohres, 1894 – Blood vessels in the labyrinth of the human ear.
- Mittelohr und labyrinth, 1897 – Middle ear and labyrinth.
- Grundzüge der Anatomie und Pathogenese der Taubstummheit, 1904 – Outline on the anatomy and pathogenesis of deaf-mutism.
- Text-book of otology for physicians and students, in 32 lectures (with Friedrich Bezold; published in English, 1908).
