= Erich Urbach =

Austrian dermatologist (1893–1946)

- Born: 29 July 1893; Prague
- Died: 17 December 1946 (aged 53); Philadelphia

Erich Urbach (29 July 1893, Prague – 17 December 1946) was an Austrian dermatologist from Vienna who, in conjunction with Camillo Wiethe, an otorhinolaryngologist, first described lipoid proteinosis.

== Biography ==
As a lieutenant in the Austrian army during World War I, he was a member of a surgical group serving under professor Anton von Eiselsberg. In 1919 he obtained his medical doctorate from the University of Vienna. He worked in the internal medicine and dermatology departments at Vienna General Hospital and also at the Breslau skin clinic, where he was an assistant to Josef Jadassohn. From 1936 to 1938, he was head physician in the dermatology department at Merchant's Hospital in Vienna, but in order to escape Nazi persecution, he emigrated to the United States in 1938. Here, he served as an associate of dermatology at the University of Pennsylvania. From 1939 onward, he was head of the allergy department at the Jewish Hospital in Philadelphia.

His book, Hautkrankheiten und Ernährung mit Berücksichtigung der Dermatosen des Kindesalters, was translated into English and published in 1932 as Skin Diseases and Nutrition, Including the Dermatoses of Children.

== See also ==
- List of dermatologists
- List of cutaneous conditions
