= Michael Bezold =

German chess grandmaster (born 1972)

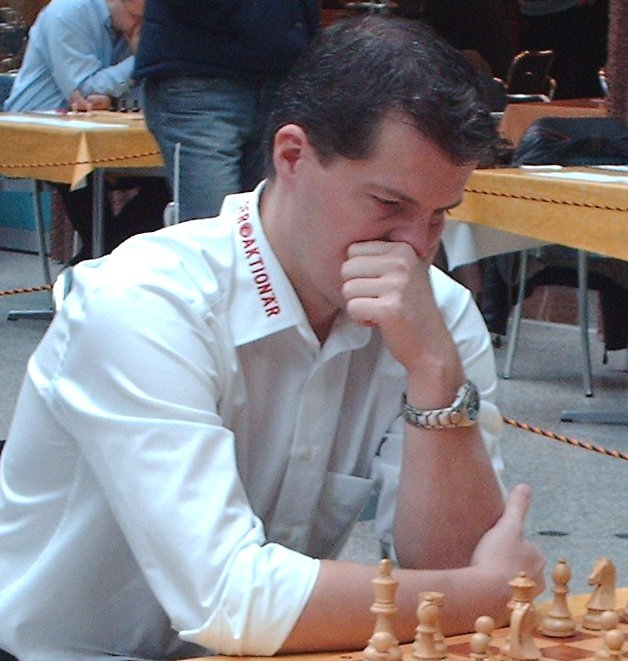
- Bezold in 2006

Personal information
- Born: May 23, 1972 (age 54) Bayreuth, Germany

Chess career
- Country: Germany
- Title: Grandmaster (1998)
- FIDE rating: 2469 (July 2026)
- Peak rating: 2535 (July 2006)

Michael Bezold is a German chess grandmaster. He earned the Grandmaster title and has been an active tournament player since 1989. His current FIDE rating is 2472; a peak rating of 2535 was achieved in July 2006. Bezold resides in Germany and plays for the German national federation.

== Career ==
Over his career, Bezold has played over 880 rated games. His overall record stands at 34.5% wins, 22.2% losses, and 43.2% draws. He has won 160 games, lost 75, and drawn 199 with white pieces. As black, he has won 146 games, lost 122, and drawn 184. Some of Bezold's most notable career achievements include:

- 1st place at the Pfalz Open in 1991
- 1st place at the Neckar-Open in 2006
- Defeated Alexander Beliavsky in 2002
- Defeated Loek van Wely in 2005
