= Georg Pezolt =

Austrian painter, architect and art critic (1810–1878)

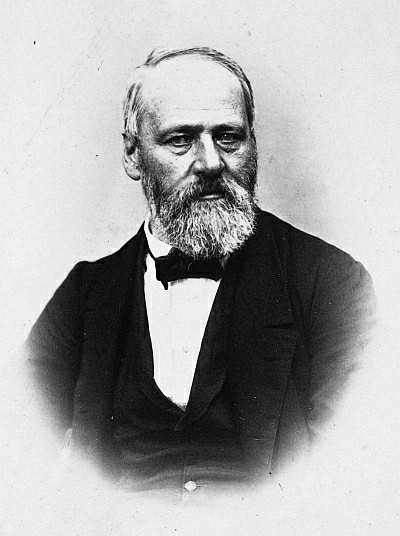
Georg Pezolt (date unknown)

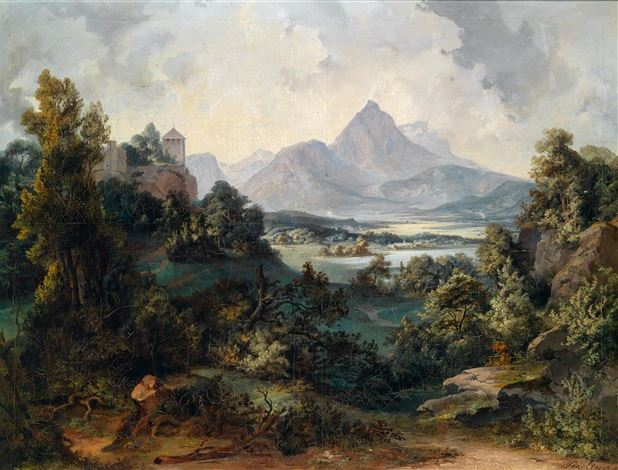
The Staufen Range (Chiemgau Alps) in Bavaria; seen from Salzburg

Georg Pezolt, also Petzoldt or Petzold (8 May 1810 – 28 October 1878) was an Austrian painter, architect and art critic, who became the first monument conservator in Salzburg.

== Life and work ==
He was born on 8 May 1810 in Salzburg. Heserved an apprenticeship with the still life painter, Johann Matthias Wurzer. At the age of seventeen, he accompanied him on a trip to Italy, with an archaeological expedition for which Wurzer was serving as a sketch artist. He returned to Salzburg in 1837, where he initially focused on painting, but would later issue a book of 144 lithographs; Most interesting points from Salzburg, Tyrol and the Salzkammergut.

After 1850, he began to spend more time devoting himself to other tasks. Through the high esteem for his works expressed by Archbishop Schwarzenberg, and his later work as a conservator, he came to have a significant influence on ecclesiastical art in the region. He was also a significant contributor to the development of the Salzburg Museum and a respected member of the Salzburger Kunstverein (Artists' Association). In addition, he took some students; notably Josef Mayburger, who was only four years his junior.

At first, he favored imagery based on ancient Roman art, but gradually became more attracted to the work of the Nazarene movement, which created an intellectual conflict with his scholarly pursuits. Although generally praised, he came under some criticism for relying too much on his imagination, rather than research.

What may be his most notable restoration involved the tower of the Franciscan Church, built in 1498. His only original architectural work was the "Borromäus Church", in Neo-Byzantine style, on the Mirabellplatz in the Neustadt district. It was demolished in 1972.

Pezolt died on 28 October 1878 in Salzburg.

== Sources ==
- Constantin von Wurzbach: "Pezold, Georg." In: Biographisches Lexikon des Kaiserthums Oesterreich (Biographical Lexicon of the Empire of Austria). Part 22 Kaiserlich-königliche Hof- und Staatsdruckerei, Vienna 1870, p. 157–159 (digitalised).
- F. Martin: "Petzoldt (Pezolt), Georg". In: Hans Vollmer (Ed.): Allgemeines Lexikon der Bildenden Künstler von der Antike bis zur Gegenwart, Vol.26: Olivier–Pieris. E. A. Seemann, Leipzig 1932, pg.517
- A. Rohrmoser: "Pezolt (Petzoldt, Pezoldt) Georg". In: Österreichisches Biographisches Lexikon 1815–1950 (ÖBL). Vol. 8, Austrian Academy of Sciences, Vienna 1983, ISBN 3-7001-0187-2, p. 21.
- Peter Keller (Ed.): Ein Traum von einer Stadt: Georg Pezolt (1810–1878) und Salzburg. Dommuseum zu Salzburg, 2011. ISBN 978-3-901162-24-4
