= Bezold's abscess =

- Specialty: Otorhinolaryngology

Bezold's abscess is an abscess deep to the sternocleidomastoid muscle where pus from mastoiditis erodes through the cortex of the mastoid part of the temporal bone, medial to the attachment of sternocleidomastoid, extends into the infratemporal fossa, and deep to the investing layer of the deep cervical fascia. It is a rare complication of acute otitis media.

== Symptoms ==
Symptoms may include:

- Severe pain in perimastoid region
- Difficulty in swallowing (dysphagia)
- Sore throat
- Difficulty in breathing (dyspnoea)
- Nuchal rigidity
- Fever

== Diagnosis ==
CT scan of mastoid and swelling of the neck.

Differential diagnosis should include:

- Acute upper jugular lymphadenitis
- Abscess or mass in Lower part of parotid
- Infected branchial cyst
- Parapharyngeal abscess
- Jugular vein thrombosis

== Treatment ==
Cortical mastoidectomy for mastoiditis. Exploration of fistulous opening into the soft tissues of neck. Drainage of the neck abscess from a separate incision and insertion of a drain. Administration of intravenous antibiotics guided by the culture and sensitivity of the pus.

== Eponym ==
It is named after Friedrich Bezold (German otologist, 1842–1908).
