= Friedrich Bezold =

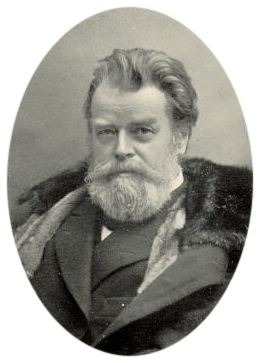

Friedrich Bezold (9 February 1842 – 5 October 1908) was a German otologist and professor at the Ludwig-Maximilians-Universität München. He made several contributions to early audiology.

He is best known for developing hearing tests with tuning forks and his work to improve education for the hearing impaired. He was also the first physician to provide a clear understanding of mastoiditis.

The following medical terms are named after him:

- Bezold's abscess
- Bezold's mastoiditis: mastoiditis with perforation into the digastric groove that creates a deep neck abscess.
- Bezold's sign: indication of descending mastoiditis
- Bezold's test: method of testing deafness by use of a tuning fork
- Bezold's triad: Three symptomatic indications of otosclerosis: 1. diminished aural perception of low frequency tones, 2. retarded bone conduction, 3. negative Rinne test
- Bezold-Edelmann continuous scale: A series of tuning forks along with Galton's whistle or monochord, in which all perceptible notes can be heard in continuous sequence. This series of tuning forks was invented alongside Munich-based scientific instrument maker Max Thomas Edelmann (1845–1912).
