= Bezold–Jarisch reflex =

Decrease in heart rate, breathing, and blood pressure due to chemical stimuli

In physiology, the Bezold–Jarisch reflex (also called the Bezold reflex, the Jarisch-Bezold reflex or Von Bezold–Jarisch reflex) involves a variety of cardiovascular and neurological processes which cause hypopnea (excessively shallow breathing or an abnormally low respiratory rate), hypotension (abnormally low blood pressure) and bradycardia (abnormally low resting heart rate) in response to noxious stimuli detected in the cardiac ventricles. The reflex is named after Albert von Bezold and Adolf Jarisch Junior. The significance of the discovery is that it was the first recognition of a chemical (non-mechanical) reflex.

== History and physiology ==
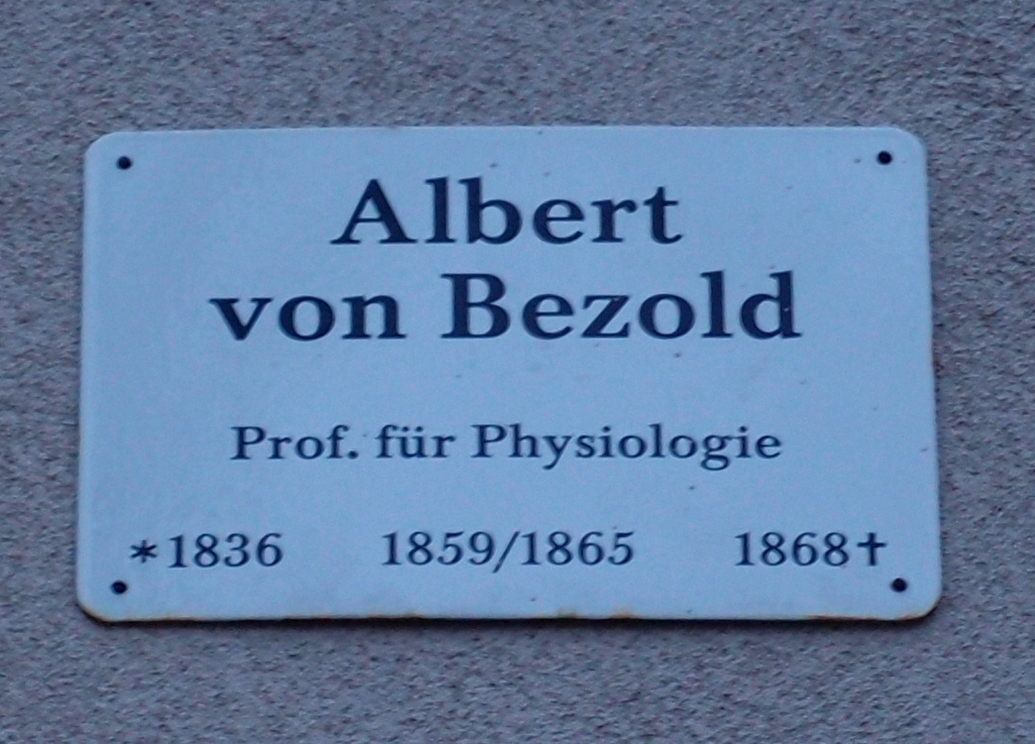
Memorial plaque for Albert von Bezold in Jena.

von Bezold and Hirt described a reaction comprising a triad of bradycardia, hypotension, and apnea (hypopnea) resulting from an intravenous injection of an alkaloidal extract of Veratrum viride or Viscum album in 1867. This observation was comparatively neglected until Jarisch and Henze re-examined it in 1937; they identified the reaction as a chemoreflex acting via the vagus nerve that was relayed in the nucleus tractus solitarii (NTS), and termed it the Bezold reflex. It is now usually called the Bezold–Jarisch reflex; however the bradycardia and hypopnea arise from anatomically distinct receptors in the heart and lung respectively and whether hypopnea should be regarded as part of the reflex is disputed. The afferent cardiac neurons relevant to the Bezold–Jarisch reflex have cell bodies in the nodose ganglion and the dorsal root ganglion. They manifest two types of nerve endings in the heart: complex unencapsulated endings located in the atrial and ventricular endocardium and an endocardial nerve network throughout the surface of the endocardium. The axons include myelinated fibers (A-fiber) and unmyelinated fibers (C-fibers) which travel with the vagus and sympathetic nerves. The myelinated afferents originating in the atria are attached to discrete receptor endings, whereas most of the unmyelinated fibers are located in the ventricles and the walls of the coronary vessels. Vagal afferent C fibers originating in the heart and lungs terminate in the NTS, while axons from the heart also inhibit sympathetic nervous activity via the caudal ventrolateral medulla (CVLM) and possibly the rostral ventrolateral medulla (RVLM). The sites of the chemoreflex and baroreflex input overlap and there is evidence that these reflexes modify each other, probably through the actions of excitatory and inhibitory neurotransmitters, such as serotonin and Gamma-Aminobutyric acid (GABA).

Although the reflex was originally described in response to Veratrum alkaloids, it can be stimulated by many biologically active chemicals, including nicotine, capsaicin, bradykinin, atrial natriuretic peptide, prostanoids, nitrovasodilators, angiotensin II type 1 receptor (AT1) antagonists and serotonin agonists. It may also contribute to various pathophysiological responses, such as:

- Severe hemorrhage and hypovolemia: During severe hemorrhage or profound hypovolemia the ventricle can become relatively empty and trigger cardiac vagal afferent fibers to elicit the Bezold–Jarisch reflex resulting in paradoxical bradycardia, vasodilation, and hypotension.
- Myocardial ischemia: Chemoreceptors located in the ventricles respond to myocardial ischemia, resulting in an increase in blood flow to the myocardium and a decrease in the work of the heart. This appears to be a cardioprotective reflex, as coronary vasodilation occurs. The pathway for this cardioprotective reflex begins with receptors in the ventricles of the heart, which detect mechanical and chemical stimuli. Afferent unmyelinated C-fibers travel through the vagus to enhance the baroreceptor reflex mechanisms, inhibit sympathetic output, and inhibit vasomotor tone, leading to peripheral vasodilation. The Bezold–Jarisch reflex is thought to be responsible for the sinus bradycardia that commonly occurs within the first hour following a myocardial infarction, and may explain the frequent occurrence of atrio-ventricular (AV) node block in acute posterior or inferior myocardial infarction. Bradycardia in this setting may be treated with atropine.
- Hypotension during coronary reperfusion
- Hypotension following injection of contrast media during coronary angiography
- Exertional syncope in aortic stenosis: in severe aortic stenosis exercise may cause a rise in left ventricular pressure which stimulates the Bezold–Jarisch reflex and results in reflex vasodilation and syncope.
- Spinal anesthesia: The Bezold–Jarisch reflex has been suggested as a possible cause of profound bradycardia and circulatory collapse after spinal anesthesia and interscalene brachial plexus block.
- Vaso-vagal syncope: the role of the Bezold–Jarisch reflex in vaso-vagal syncope is unclear. Upright posture results in pooling of blood in the lower extremities that diminishes venous return and results in a reduced cardiac output. The resultant lowering of blood pressure is sensed by carotid sinus baroreceptors, and stimulates the baroreflex to inhibit vagal activity and stimulate the sympathetic nervous system – this increases heart rate and contractility, induces vasoconstriction, and tends to restore blood pressure. However, if the Bezold–Jarisch reflex is activated due to the reduced ventricular volume this may trigger paradoxical bradycardia and arterial hypotension resulting in syncope. The importance of this mechanism is unclear since vaso-vagal syncope can be observed in cardiac transplant patients who are presumed to lack cardiac innervation. If it operates this phenomenon would be expected to be exacerbated if the individual is dehydrated. It has also been proposed that this mechanism accounts for the increased susceptibility to orthostatic syncope of astronauts after space flights.
