= Hinko Urbach =

Croatian Rabbi

Rabbi Hinko Urbach

Personal life
- Born: 29 September 1872 Morávka, Austro-Hungarian Empire (now Czech Republic)
- Died: 1960 (aged 88) Paris, France
- Spouse: Sara (née Feldmann) Urbach

Religious life
- Religion: Judaism
- Denomination: Orthodox Judaism

Jewish leader
- Position: Rabbi
- Residence: Zagreb

Hinko Urbach (1872–1960) was Zagreb Chief Rabbi.

Urbach was born in Morávka, Czech Republic to Jewish parents on September 29, 1872. His mother died when he was 7 years old. After his father remarried, Urbach was sent away from home to learn craft as a shoemaker's apprentice. Later he was sent to cheder in Český Těšín. After Cheder, he was educated at Moses Sofers yeshiva in Bratislava. After completing his studies at yeshiva, he stayed there for a time and worked as a teacher. In 1898, he enrolled at higher Master of rabbinical school in Budapest, Hungary. There he meet his future wife Sara (née Feldmann) Urbach. Simultaneously he attended the Faculty of Philosophy in Budapest, study of comparative philology of Semitic languages, from which he graduated in 1904.

In 1906, he went to Tuzla, Bosnia and Herzegovina and worked there as a Rabbi for 5 years. Since half of the congregation were native Sephardi Jews, and another half settler Ashkenazi Jews from Austria, Urbach himself Ashkenazi held separated ceremonies at the synagogue. In 1911, he moved to Zemun, Austria-Hungary. During World War I, Urbach was mobilized as a military rabbi in the Austro-Hungarian Army. After the war, he returned to Zemun. In 1928, when Sarajevo ashkenazi congregation rabbi Samuel Vesel died, Urbach was an appointed as his successor. During World War II, Urbach and his family found refuge in Italy, from where they moved to Lausanne in Switzerland. His valuable library was seized by Nazis and taken to Berlin for future "Museum of an Extinct Race". After the war, Urbach returned to Sarajevo and in 1946 he was moved to Zagreb. There he was appointed as Zagreb chief rabbi. He later made Aliyah with his wife in Israel. Urbach died in 1960 in Paris, at his sons apartment, Benjamin Urbah.

== Bibliography ==
- Švob, Melita (2010). Židovska populacija u Hrvatskoj i Zagrebu. Zagreb: AGM, Židovska općina Zagreb. ISBN 978-953-680-012-4.
