= Albert von Bezold =

German physiologist (1836–1868)

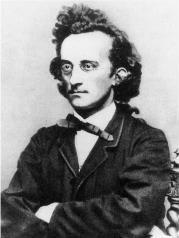
- Born: January 7, 1836; Ansbach
- Died: March 2, 1868 (aged 32)
- Occupation: Physiologist
- Known for: Discovering the Bezold–Jarisch reflex

Albert von Bezold (January 7, 1836 – March 2, 1868) was a German physiologist.

== Biography ==
Bezold was born in Ansbach on January 7, 1836.

He studied at the Ludwig-Maximilians-Universität München, the University of Würzburg, and the Friedrich Wilhelm University of Berlin, where he was an assistant to Emil Du Bois-Reymond (1818–1896). Later he was a professor of physiology at Jena (from 1859) and Würzburg (from 1865).

Bezold performed important research involving the physiology of the muscles, nerves and cardiovascular system. He is also remembered for studying the physiological effects of pharmacological substances such as curare, atropine and veratrum on the body's muscles, heart, nerves and circulatory system.

The eponymous "Bezold—Jarisch reflex" is a triad of responses (apnea, bradycardia, and hypotension) resulting from an intravenous injection of veratrum alkaloids. This medical sign is named along with pharmacologist Adolf Jarisch Jr. (1891–1965), who in 1937 re-confirmed Bezold's earlier experiments.

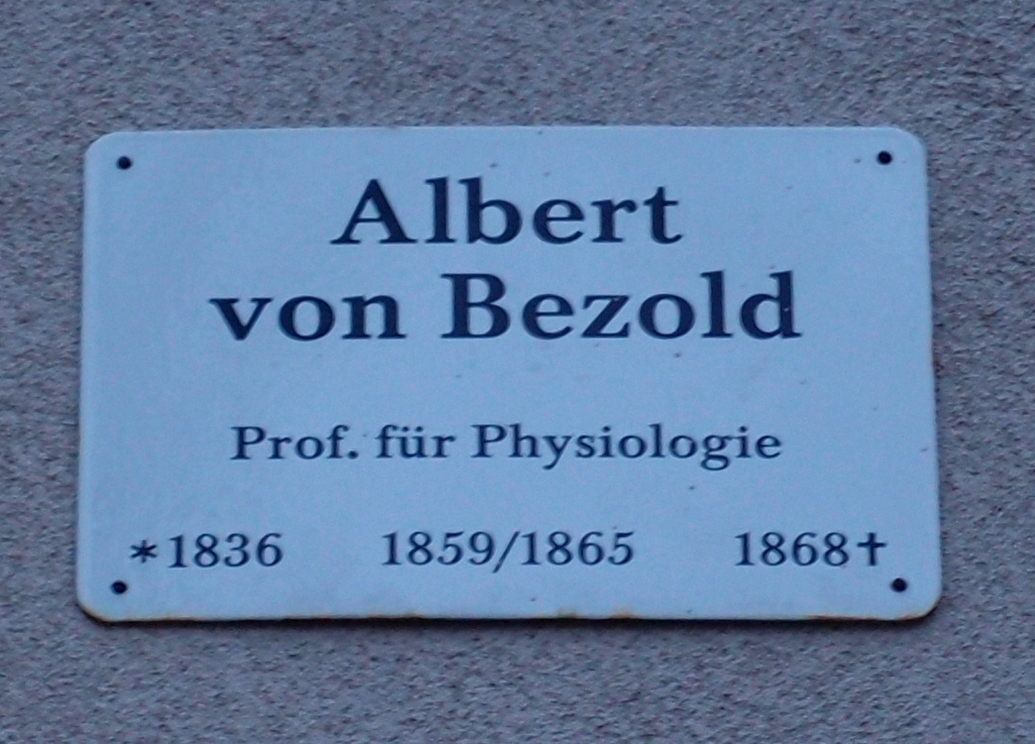
Plaque of Bezold in Jena

Bezold died at the age of 32 due to a mitral stenosis caused by rheumatic endocarditis.

== Associated eponym ==
- "Bezold's ganglion": an aggregation of ganglion cells in the interatrial septum. Described in Untersuchungen über die Innervation des Herzens (1863), pp. 191–232.
