= List of eponymous medical signs =

Eponymous medical signs are those that are named after a person or persons, usually the physicians who first described them, but occasionally a famous patient. This list includes other eponymous entities of diagnostic significance, such as tests and reflexes.

Sign	Name	Specialty	Associated conditions	External link (if no internal link)	Descriptor
Aaron's sign	Charles Dettie Aaron	surgery	appendicitis		epigastric pain with pressure on McBurney's point
Abadie's sign	Jean Marie Charles Abadie	endocrinology	Graves' disease		levator palpebrae superioris spasm
Abadie's symptom	Joseph Louis Irenée Jean Abadie	neurology	tabes dorsalis		absence of pain on Achilles tendon pressure
Abderhalden reaction	Emil Abderhalden	obstetrics	pregnancy		serum reaction;obsolete
Abelin reaction	Isaak Abelin	infectious disease	syphilis		presence of arsenical anti-syphilitic;obsolete
Addis count	Thomas Addis	nephrology	pyelonephritis		quantitative cells and casts in 24hr. urine
Adie pupil	William John Adie	neurology	ciliary nerve damage		dilated pupil, poorly reactive but with normal near accommodation
Adson's sign	Alfred Washington Adson	vascular surgery	thoracic outlet syndrome		obliteration of radial pulse with manoeuvres
Alexander's law	Gustav Alexander	neurology, neurosurgery, ENT	vestibular lesions		describes nystagmus in vestibular lesions
Allen's test	Edgar Van Nuys Allen	vascular surgery, critical care	arterial supply of the hand		tests for presence of palmar ulnar-radial anastomosis (palmar arch)
Apgar score	Virginia Apgar	obstetrics, pediatrics			assess health of newborn
Apley grind test	Alan Graham Apley	orthopaedic surgery	meniscal lesions		manoeuvres to elicit knee pain
Argyll Robertson pupils	Douglas Moray Cooper Lamb Argyll Robertson	neurology	neurosyphilis		light-near dissociation
Arneth count	Josef Arneth	haematology, nutrition	folate deficiency		lobulation of neutrophil nuclei
Asboe-Hansen sign	Gustav Asboe-Hansen	dermatology	bullae		extension of a blister to adjacent unblistered skin when pressed
Aschheim–Zondek test	Selmar Aschheim, Bernhard Zondek	obstetrics	normal pregnancy	synd/1834 at Whonamedit?	oestral reaction in mouse injected with pregnant urine
Aschoff body	Karl Albert Ludwig Aschoff	rheumatology, pathology	rheumatic fever		foci of interstitial inflammation in the myocardium and elsewhere
Ashby technique	Winifred Ashby	haematology, pathology	haemolysis	synd/233 at Whonamedit?	agglutination test for erythrocyte survival
Auberger's blood group	Auberger (patient)	haematology	normal physiology	synd/283 at Whonamedit?	Aua antigen
Auenbrugger's sign	Josef Leopold Auenbrugger	cardiology	pericardial effusion	synd/284 at Whonamedit?	bulging epigastrium
Auer rods	John Auer	hematology	acute myeloid leukemia		cytoplasmic inclusions in myeloblasts
Auspitz's sign	Heinrich Auspitz	dermatology	psoriasis		pinpoint bleeding when scales are removed from psoriasis or warts
Austin Flint murmur	Austin Flint	cardiology	aortic insufficiency		mid-diastolic rumble heard at apex
Babinski sign	Joseph Babinski	neurology	abnormal plantar reflex	Kumar SP, Ramasubramanian D (December 2000). "The Babinski sign—a reappraisal". Neurol India. 48 (4): 314–8. PMID 11146592.	dorsiflexion of the hallux with fanning of the remaining phalanges upon soft stimulation of the lateral plantar surface of the foot
Bainbridge reflex	Francis Arthur Bainbridge	cardiology	normal physiology		increase in heart rate with increase in circulating blood volume
Balbiani rings	Edouard-Gérard Balbiani	genetics	RNA transcription	synd/601 at Whonamedit?	large chromosome puff indicating site of RNA transcription
Ballance's sign	Charles Alfred Ballance	general surgery	abdominal/splenic trauma		percussive dullness left flank, LUQ, percussive resonance right flank
Bancroft's sign	Joseph Bancroft	vascular medicine	deep vein thrombosis		pain on anterior, but not lateral, compression of calf
Bárány test	Robert Bárány	ENT, neurology	vertigo, vestibular dysfunction	synd/595 at Whonamedit?	nystagmus elicited by hot or cold irrigation of ear canal
Barlow's maneuver	Thomas Geoffrey Barlow, English Pediatric Orthopedist, (1915–1975)	paediatrics, orthopaedic surgery	hip dysplasia		dislocation on adduction of hip
Bart hemoglobin	Barts Hospital	Obstetrics, pathology	indicates a specific cause of death in some stillborns		Loss of all four alpha-globin genes (total alpha-thalassemia) leads to severely anemic stillborn babies with small amounts of an abnormal hemoglobin composed of four gamma sub-units (Bart's Hemoglobin)
Bastian–Bruns sign	Henry Charlton Bastian, Ludwig Bruns	neurology	spinal cord transection		loss of muscle tone and reflexes below lesion level
Battle's sign	William Henry Battle	neurosurgery/traumatology	basal skull fracture		mastoid ecchymosis
Beau's lines	Joseph Honoré Simon Beau	dermatology, internal medicine	multiple, including trauma		transverse ridges on nails
Beck's triad	Claude Schaeffer Beck	cardiology	cardiac tamponade		hypotension, increased central venous pressure (JVP), distant heart sounds
Becker's sign	Otto Heinrich Enoch Becker	ophthalmology, endocrinology	thyrotoxicosis		visible pulsation of retinal arteries
Beevor's sign	Charles Edward Beevor	neurology, neurosurgery	spinal trauma at T10		cephalad movement of navel on cervical flexion
Bekhterev–Jacobsohn reflex	Vladimir Bekhterev, Louis Jacobsohn-Lask	neurology	pyramidal tract lesions		stroking dorsal radial skin, with forearm in supination, elicits wrist and finger flexion
Bekhterev–Mendel reflex	Vladimir Bekhterev, Kurt Mendel	neurology	pyramidal tract lesions		toe flexion on percussion of dorsum of foot
Bence Jones protein	Henry Bence Jones	hematology	multiple myeloma		
Benedict solution	Stanley Rossiter Benedict	endocrinology	diabetes mellitus		reagent for presence of monosaccharides
Berger wave (rhythm)	Hans Berger	neurology	normal physiology		electroencephalographic alpha wave
Bezold–Jarisch reflex	Albert von Bezold, Adolf Jarisch	pharmacology, toxicology	effect of certain alkaloids		apnea, bradycardia, hypotension
Bielschowsky's head tilt test	Alfred Bielschowsky	neurology, ophthalmology	lesions of cranial nerve IV		test for palsy of superior oblique muscle
Bing's sign	Paul Robert Bing	neurology	pyramidal tract lesions		extension of the great toe on pricking the dorsum of the foot with a pin
Biot's respiration	Camille Biot	neurology	brain stem herniation		quick shallow respirations followed by period of apnea
Bitot's spots	Pierre Bitôt	ophthalmology	vitamin A deficiency		spots of keratin deposition in the conjunctiva
Bjerrum scotoma	Jannik Peterson Bjerrum	ophthalmology	glaucoma		comet shaped visual field defect, extending temporally from the physiological blind spot
Blumberg's sign	Jacob Moritz Blumberg	surgery	peritonitis		rebound tenderness
Boas' point	Ismar Isidor Boas	gastroenterology	gastric ulcer		dermal hyperaesthesia just left of T12
Boas' sign	Ismar Isidor Boas	gastroenterology	acute cholecystitis		dermal hyperaesthesia at inferior angle of R scapula
Bodansky unit	Aaron Bodansky	clinical chemistry			unit of alkaline phosphatase concentration in blood
Boston's sign	Leonard N. Boston	ophthalmology, endocrinology	thyrotoxicosis		spasmodic ptosis on downward gaze
Bouchard's nodes	Charles-Joseph Bouchard	rheumatology	osteoarthritis		bony outgrowths on dorsa of proximal interphalangeal joints
Bracht–Wachter bodies	Erich Franz Eugen Bracht, Hermann Julius Gustav Wächter	cardiology	infective endocarditis		yellow-white spots in the myocardium
Branham's sign	Henry Branham	vascular surgery, nephrology	chronic kidney disease, hemodialysis		pressing on proximal portion of AV fistula results in bradycardia
Braxton Hicks contraction	John Braxton Hicks	obstetrics	normal pregnancy		"false labour". sporadic contractions beginning as early as mid 1st trimester
Brewer infarcts	George Emerson Brewer	nephrology, pathology	pyelonephritis		dark red wedge shaped areas on kidney section resembling infarcts
Brissaud's reflex	Édouard Brissaud	neurology	pyramidal tract lesions		plantar stimulation elicits contraction of tensor fasciae latae
Broadbent inverted sign	Sir William Broadbent, 1st Baronet	cardiology	L atrial hypertrophy		systole palpable in posterior chest wall
Broadbent sign	Walter Broadbent	cardiology	adhesive pericarditis		recession of L inferior intercostal spaces
Broca aphasia	Paul Broca	neurology, neuropsychology	developmental or other pathology of various frontal cortical areas		expressive aphasia
Brodie–Trendelenburg percussion test	Sir Benjamin Collins Brodie, 1st Baronet, Friedrich Trendelenburg	general medicine, surgery	varicose veins		superficial vein is percussed proximally; if impulse is felt over vein distally, valvular incompetence is present
Budin's sign	Pierre-Constant Budin	surgery, obstetrics	suppurative mastitis		if breast milk flown into a sterile pad is mixed with pus (brown, yellow or bloody traces), mastitis may be present
Brodie–Trendelenburg test	Sir Benjamin Collins Brodie, 1st Baronet, Friedrich Trendelenburg	general medicine, surgery	varicose veins		identifies level of valvular incompetence
Brudziński neck sign	Józef Brudziński	neurology	meningitis		neck flexion elicits hip and knee flexion
Brudziński cheek sign	Józef Brudziński	neurology	meningitis		pressure beneath zygoma elicits flexion of forearm
Brudziński symphyseal sign	Józef Brudziński	neurology	meningitis		pressure over symphisis pubis elicits knee, hip flexion and leg abduction
Brudziński reflex	Józef Brudziński	neurology	meningitis		passive flexion of knee to abdomen elicits flexion of contralateral hip and knee
Bruit de Roger	Henri-Louis Roger	paediatric cardiology	ventricular septal defect		loud pansystolic murmur
Bruns ataxia	Ludwig Bruns	neurology	frontal lobe lesions		difficulty moving feet in contact with floor, tendency to fall backwards
Bruns nystagmus	Ludwig Bruns	neurology	cerebellopontine angle tumor, vestibular schwannoma		nystagmus that coarsens in amplitude on lateral gaze
Brushfield spots	Thomas Brushfield	ophthalmology, genetics	Down syndrome or non-pathological		greyish-white spots at periphery of iris
Buerger's test	Leo Buerger	general medicine, surgery	peripheral artery disease		pallor of the leg upon elevation
Burton line	Henry Burton	toxicology	lead poisoning	NEJM 354:e21 5/18/06	blue discolouration of the gingival border
Cabot rings	Richard Cabot	hematology	lead poisoning, anaemias		threadlike strands in erythrocytes
Caput medusae	Medusa	gastroenterology, surgery	portal hypertension		distended veins radiating from umbilicus
Cardarelli's sign	Antonio Cardarelli	cardiology, thoracic surgery	aortic arch dilatation or aneurysm, mediastinal tumour		left displacement of trachea elicits palpable pulsation of same
Carey Coombs murmur	Carey Coombs	cardiology, rheumatology	rheumatic fever		mid-diastolic rumble
Carnett's sign	John Berton Carnett	primary care, surgery	abdominal mass and/or pain	Am J Med Sci 174 (1927): 579–599	supine patient lifts head from bed;↑ pain – abdominal wall ;↓ pain – intraperitoneal
Carvallo's sign	José Manuel Rivero Carvallo	cardiology	tricuspid regurgitation		increase in volume of murmur on inspiration
Casal collar	Gaspar Casal	nutrition	pellagra (niacin deficiency)	Casal collar at Medscape	widely variable collar of dermatitis characteristically in c3,c4 dermatomes
Casoni test	Tomaso Casoni	infectious disease, tropical medicine	hydatid disease		intradermal injection of hydatid fluid causing wheal
Celsus signs of inflammation	Aulus Cornelius Celsus	various	inflammation		1. Rubor (redness) 2. Tumor (swelling)3. Calor (heat) 4. Dolor (pain)
Chaddock reflex	Charles Gilbert Chaddock	neurology	pyramidal lesions, corticospinal tract lesions		extension of big toe with stimulation of skin over lateral malleolus
Chadwick sign	James Read Chadwick	obstetrics	pregnancy		cyanosis of vulva, vagina and cervix
Chagas disease	Carlos Chagas	infectious disease, tropical medicine	heart failure		Heart failure, enlarged esophagus, enlarged colon
Charcot's triad	Jean-Martin Charcot	surgery	ascending cholangitis		jaundice, fever and chills, RUQ pain
Charcot's triad	Jean-Martin Charcot	neurology	multiple sclerosis		nystagmus, intention tremor, staccato speech
Charcot–Leyden crystals	Jean-Martin Charcot, Ernst Viktor von Leyden	pathology	any disorder characterized by eosinophil proliferation, e.g. ascariasis		lysophospholipase crystals in various tissues
Cheyne–Stokes respiration	John Cheyne, William Stokes	palliative care	respiratory center damage		fluctuation between apnoea and tachypnoea
Churchill–Cope reflex	Edward Delos Churchill, Oliver Cope	cardiology	heart failure		distension of pulmonary vascular bed causes tachypnoea
Chvostek sign	František Chvostek	endocrinology	hypocalcemia		tapping over facial nerve elicits abnormal muscle contraction(s)
Claybrook sign	Edwin Claybrook	emergency medicine, surgery	blunt abdominal trauma		heart and/or breath sounds heard through abdominal wall indicate rupture of viscus
Clutton's joints	Henry Hugh Clutton	paediatrics	congenital syphilis		painless symmetrical hydrarthroses, particularly of the knees
Codman's triangle	Ernest Codman	oncology, orthopaedic surgery, radiology	osteosarcoma, Ewing's sarcoma		triangular subperiosteal growth
Comby sign	Jules Comby	paediatrics	rubeola		whitish patches on gingiva and buccal mucosa
Comolli's sign	Antonio Comolli	Orthopaedic surgery	Scapular fracture	"Comolli's sign". The Free Dictionary.	triangular swelling corresponding to the outline of the scapula
Coombs test	Robin Coombs	hematology	hemolytic anemia		
Coons fluorescent antibody method	Albert Coons	immunology		Albert Coons at National Academies Press	detection of antibodies by fluorescence microscopy using fluorescein-labelled antibodies
Cornell's sign	Ethel L. Cornell, American Neuropsychologist and Psychiatrist, Columbia University NY (1882–1972)	neurology	pyramidal tract lesions	The Babinski sign – a reappraisal Neurol India 48 (4): 314–8.	scratching alongside big toe extensor tendon elicits an extensor plantar response
Corrigan pulse	Dominic John Corrigan	cardiology	aortic insufficiency		carotid pulsations with abrupt ascending and descending phases
Councilman body	William Thomas Councilman	infectious disease	yellow fever, viral haemorrhagic fevers		eosinophilic globules in liver
Courvoisier's law	Ludwig Georg Courvoisier	gastroenterology	obstructive jaundice		palpable gall bladder w/ painless jaundice unlikely to be cholelithiasis
Crichton-Browne sign	Sir James Crichton-Browne	neuropsychiatry	'general paresis'		tremor at corners of mouth and of outer canthus
Crowe sign	Frank W. Crowe	dermatology	neurofibromatosis type I		axillary freckling
Cruveilhier–Baumgarten bruit	Jean Cruveilhier, Paul Clemens von Baumgarten	hepatology	Cruveilhier–Baumgarten disease		bruit around the umbilicus
Cullen's sign	Thomas S. Cullen	surgery, obstetrics	intra-abdominal haemorrhage, ectopic pregnancy		ecchymosis around umbilicus predicts onset of acute pancreatitis
Curschmann spirals	Heinrich Curschmann	pulmonology	asthma		spiral mucus plugs found in sputum
Cushing's triad	Harvey Cushing	neurology	raised intracranial pressure		elevated systolic bp, bradycardia, irregular respiration
Dagher Maneuver	Nabil Dagher	trauma surgery	penetrating pelvic trauma		bimanual palpation of foreign object lodged in pelvis with one digit in an incision lateral to the anus and the other digit inserted in the rectum
Dahlén–Fuchs nodules	Johan Dahlén, Ernst Fuchs	ophthalmology	sympathetic ophthalmia	granulocytic infiltrate of the uvea	
Dahl's sign	K.V. Dahl	pulmonology	COPD		pigmented calluses on anterior surface of thighs (from leaning on elbows)
Dalrymple sign	John Dalrymple	ophthalmology, endocrinology	thyrotoxicosis	synd/494 at Whonamedit?	widened palpebral opening
Dance's sign	Jean Baptiste Hippolyte Dance	(paediatric)surgery	ileo-cecal intussusception	synd/3355 at Whonamedit?	empty RLQ (retracted right iliac fossa)
Darier's sign	Ferdinand-Jean Darier	allergy, dermatology	urticaria pigmentosa		dermatographia
Dawson's fingers	James Walker Dawson	neurology	multiple sclerosis		characteristic fingerlike appearance of lateral ventricle on mri, ct, or at autopsy
De Musset's sign	Alfred de Musset	cardiology	aortic insufficiency		head nodding in time with heartbeat
Dennie–Morgan fold	Charles Clayton Dennie; DB Morgan	dermatology	atopic dermatitis	Dennie's line at TheFreeDictionary.com	accentuated fold below the lower eyelid
Destot's sign	Etienne Destot	orthopaedic surgery	pelvic fracture		ecchymosis superior to inguinal ligament, in scrotum or of thigh
Dix–Hallpike test	Margaret R. Dix, Charles Skinner Hallpike	otolaryngology	Benign paroxysmal positional vertigo	synd/3615 at Whonamedit?	Elicitation of extreme vertigo upon lateral movement of a patient's head when lying in a supine position
Döhle bodies	Karl Gottfried Paul Döhle	pathology	various including trauma and neoplasm		basophilic inclusions in peripheral cytoplasm of neutrophils
Doi's sign	Hitoka Doi	neurology	Eaton–Lambert syndrome		reappearance of absent deep tendon reflexes after short period of maximal muscle contraction
Dunphy's sign	Osborne Joby Dunphy	surgery	appendicitis		increase in abdominal pain on coughing
Duroziez's sign	Paul Louis Duroziez	cardiology	aortic insufficiency		double bruit heard over femoral artery when it is compressed distally (see Traube's sign)
Elschnig spots	Anton Elschnig	ophthalmology	hypertensive retinopathy		
Epstein's pearls	Alois Epstein	paediatrics	normal newborn		cystic papules on palate
Ewart's sign	William Ewart	cardiology	pericardial effusion		percussive dullness, aegophony and bronchial breath sounds at L scapular tip
Faget sign	Jean-Charles Faget	infectious disease	yellow fever Typhoid Fever tularaemia brucellosis others	Faget's sign at Whonamedit?	the unusual constellation of fever and bradycardia
Finkelstein's test	Harry Finkelstein	rheumatology	DeQuervain's tenosynovitis		
Forchheimer spots	Frederick Forchheimer	paediatrics	rubella		small red spots on the soft palate
Fothergill's sign	John Fothergill	surgery	rectus sheath hematoma		anterior abdominal mass which does not cross the midline and is still palpable when abdominal wall muscles are tensed
Fox's sign	George Henry Fox	gastroenterology	haemorrhagic pancreatitis		ecchymosis of inguinal ligament (blood tracks retroperitoneally)
Frank's sign	Sanders T. Frank	cardiology	ischaemic heart disease		ear crease indicating risk of heart disease (disputed)
Friedreich's sign	Nikolaus Friedreich	cardiology	constrictive pericarditis, tricuspid insufficiency		collapse of distended neck veins in diastole
Froment's sign	Jules Froment	neurology	ulnar nerve palsy		patient required to hold paper between thumb and palm (against attempt to withdraw);ability to do so is assessed
Gallavardin phenomenon	Louis Gallavardin	cardiology	aortic stenosis		dissociation of musical and noisy elements in ejection murmur
Gamna–Favre bodies	Carlos Gamna, Maurice Favre	histology	lymphogranuloma venereum	Gamna-Favre bodies at Whonamedit?	basophilic cytoplasmic inclusion bodies
Gandy–Gamna nodules	Charles Gandy, Carlos Gamna	histology	splenomegaly due to portal hypertension and sickle cell disease	Gandy-Gamna bodies at Whonamedit?	small yellow-brown foci in the spleen
Garrod's pads	Archibald Garrod	dermatology	repeated extreme tension of extensor tendon in interphalangeal joint		thickening of skin and tissue over interphalangeal joint
Gerhardt's sign	Carl Jakob Adolf Christian Gerhardt			Gerhardt's sign at Whonamedit? http://cancerweb.ncl.ac.uk/cgi-bin/omd?Biermer's+sign	controversial: see references
Glasgow Coma Scale	Glasgow	neurology	A neurological scale which aims to give a reliable and objective way of recording the conscious state of a person for initial as well as subsequent assessment.		The sum of Eye, Motor and Verbal responses.
Goetz sign	Robert H. Goetz	Patent Ductus Arteriosus	Seen during right ventriculography in the setting of a patent ductus arteriosus, the Goetz sign refers to the negative contrast effect seen in the pulmonary artery from non-contrast enhanced blood shunting left to right from the aorta		
Gonda's sign	Viktor Gonda, Ukrainian Neuropsychiatrist, (1889–1959)	neurology	pyramidal tract lesions	The Babinski sign – a reappraisal Neurol India 48 (4): 314–8.	flexing then suddenly releasing the 4th toe elicits an extensor plantar response
Goodell's sign	William Goodell	obstetrics	pregnancy		softening of the vaginal part of the cervix during the first trimester
Goodsall's rule	David Henry Goodsall	gastroenterology, general surgery	anal fistula		anatomical relationships, differentiation of fistula types
Gordon's sign	Alfred Gordon	neurology	pyramidal tract lesions	The Babinski sign – a reappraisal Neurol India 48 (4): 314–8.	squeezing the calf muscle elicits an extensor plantar response
Gottron's papules	Heinrich Adolf Gottron	rheumatology	dermatomyositis	Pathologic Basis of Disease (8th Ed), Robbins & Cotran	Scaling, erythematous eruption or dusky red patches over the knuckles, elbows and knees
Gowers' sign	William Richard Gowers	neurology	muscular dystrophy		
Graham Steell murmur	Graham Steell	cardiology	mitral stenosis		pulmonary regurgitation murmur in patients with pulmonary hypertension secondary to mitral stenosis
Grey Turner's sign	George Grey Turner	surgery	retroperitoneal hemorrhage		flank ecchymosis
Griffith's sign	Alexander Hill Griffith, Scottish Ophthalmologist, Manchester (1858–1937)	endocrinology	Graves' ophthalmopathy	(needed)	lid lag of the lower eyelid on upward eye movement
Grisel's syndrome	Pierre Grisel	rheumatology			non-traumatic subluxation of the atlanto-axial joint caused by inflammation of the adjacent tissues
Gunn's sign	Robert Marcus Gunn	ophthalmology	hypertension	Gunn's sign at Whonamedit?	AV "nicking" or "nipping" in hypertensive retinopathy
Hamman's sign	Louis Hamman	thoracic surgery	oesophageal perforation w/ pneumomediastinum		crepitus in sync w/ heartbeat but not respiration
Hampton's hump	Aubrey Otis Hampton	pulmonology, radiology	pulmonary embolus with infarct	Hampton's hump at Whonamedit?	wedge shaped consolidation at periphery with base on the pleura
Hampton's line	Aubrey Otis Hampton	radiology, gastroenterology	peptic ulcer	Hampton's line at Whonamedit?	line on barium meal indicating mucosal oedema associated with ulcer
Hannington-Kiff sign	John G. Hannington-Kiff	general surgery	obturator hernia		absent thigh adductor reflex with positive patellar reflex
Harrison's groove	Edward Harrison	internal medicine	rickets	Harrison's sulcus at Whonamedit?	rib deformity at the lower thorax
Hatchcock's sign	?	paediatrics, infectious disease	mumps	(needed)	tenderness behind angle of jaw (typically before swelling is evident)
Heberden's node	William Heberden	rheumatology	osteoarthritis		same as bouchard's nodes, but over dip joints
Hegar's sign	Ernst Ludwig Alfred Hegar	obstetrics	normal pregnancy		softening of cervical isthmus appearing between 4th and 6th weeks (usually)
Hess test	Alfred Fabian Hess	internal medicine	capillary fragility	Rumpel-Konchalevskii-Leede phenomenon or sign at Whonamedit?	appearance of petechiae after compression of arm by bandage or blood pressure cuff
Hildreth's sign	DH Hildreth	dermatology	glomus tumor		Relief of pain at tumor site upon vascular occlusion of limb, with acute return of pain on reperfusion
Hippocratic face	Hippocrates	palliative care	impending death		
Hippocratic fingers	Hippocrates	pulmonary medicine	chronic hypoxia		clubbing of distal phalanges
Hirschberg test	Julius Hirschberg	ophthalmology	strabismus		corneal reflection centred (-) or not centred (+) on pupil
Hoffmann's sign	Johann Hoffmann	neurology	corticospinal tract lesions		tapping distal phalanx of 3rd or 4th finger elicits flexion of same in thumb
Hollenhorst plaque	Robert Hollenhorst	ophthalmology	hypertension, coronary artery disease, and/or diabetes		cholesterol embolus(i) of retinal artery(ies)
Homans' sign	John Homans	thrombosis	deep venous thrombosis		knee bent, ankle abruptly dorsiflexed, popliteal pain
Hoover's sign (leg paresis)	Charles Franklin Hoover	neurology, psychiatry	lower extremity paresis		differentiates organic from non-organic etiology
Hoover's sign (pulmonary)	Charles Franklin Hoover	pulmonology	COPD		inward movement of lower ribs during inspiration
Howship–Romberg sign	John Howship, Moritz Heinrich Romberg	surgery	obturator hernia	Howship's syndrome at Whonamedit?	pain from an obturator hernia radiating to knee
Hutchinson's freckle	Sir Jonathan Hutchinson	dermatology	melanoma	Hutchinson's freckle at Whonamedit?	precancerous facial pigmentation
Hutchinson's pupil	Sir Jonathan Hutchinson	neurology	oculomotor nerve lesion	Hutchinson's pupil at Whonamedit?	dilated pupil on the side of an intracranial lesion due to IIIrd nerve compression
Hutchinson's sign	Sir Jonathan Hutchinson	ophthalmology	herpes zoster	Hutchinson's sign 2 at Whonamedit?	lesion on tip of the nose which can presage ocular herpes zoster
Hutchinson's teeth	Sir Jonathan Hutchinson	pediatrics	congenital syphilis		small, widely spaced incisors with notched biting surfaces
Hutchinson's triad	Sir Jonathan Hutchinson	pediatrics	congenital syphilis		interstitial keratitis, nerve deafness, Hutchinson's teeth
Janeway lesion	Theodore Caldwell Janeway	cardiology	infective endocarditis		palmar or plantar erythematous or haemorrhagic papules
Jendrassik maneuver	Ernő Jendrassik	neurology	hyporeflexia		compares patellar reflex w/ and w/o distraction
Jobe's relocation test	Christopher Jobe	orthopedics			
Joffroy's sign	Alexis Joffroy	endocrinology	exophthalmos in Graves disease	Joffroy's sign I at Whonamedit?	lack of forehead wrinkling when patient looks up with head bowed
Jolly's test	Friedrich Jolly	neurology	myasthenia gravis or Eaton–Lambert syndrome		electromyography test using repeated stimuli to show fatiguability in myasthenia
Jones criteria	T. Duckett Jones	rheumatology	rheumatic fever		criteria used to diagnose rheumatic fever
Kanavel's sign	Allen B. Kanavel	orthopedics, rheumatology	tenosynovitis of flexor digitorum tendon	http://www.emedicine.com/orthoped/TOPIC97.HTM	(1) finger held in slight flexion, (2) fusiform swelling, (3) tenderness along the flexor tendon sheath, and (4) pain with passive extension of the digit.
Kayser–Fleischer ring	Bernhard Kayser, Bruno Fleischer	neurology, gastroenterology	Wilson's disease (hepatolenticular degeneration)		ring of brownish copper deposit at corneo-scleral junction
Kehr's sign	Hans Kehr	trauma surgery	ruptured spleen		referred pain to L shoulder
Kelly's sign	Howard Atwood Kelly	surgery, urology			visible response of ureter when touched (means of identifying same)
Kerley lines	Peter Kerley	radiology	pulmonary edema		
Kernig's sign	Woldemar Kernig	neurology	meningism, meningitis, subarachnoid haemorrhage	synd/2200 at Whonamedit?	hip and knee fully flexed, extension of knee elicits pain and/or opisthotonus
Kocher's sign	Emil Theodor Kocher	ophthalmology, endocrinology	Hyperthyroidism, Basedow's disease,		In fixation on a fast upwards movement there occurs a convulsive retraction of the eyelid
Koebner's phenomenon	Heinrich Koebner	dermatology	various conditions		
Koeppe's nodules	Leonhard Koeppe	ophthalmology	uveitis		granulomatous nodules at pupillary margin
Koplik's spots	Henry Koplik	pediatrics	measles		
Korotkoff sounds	Nikolai Korotkov	cardiology	auscultatory sphygmomanometry		Korotkov described 5 sounds. Only the first (the onset of audible sound, and corresponding to systolic pressure) and the fifth (sound becomes inaudible, corresponding to diastolic pressure) are of practical clinical significance (however, see:Auscultatory gap)
Kussmaul breathing	Adolph Kussmaul	endocrinology	metabolic acidosis		laboured deep breathing with normal or reduced frequency
Kussmaul's sign	Adolph Kussmaul	cardiology	various, including right side failure		increased jugular distension on inspiration
Kveim test	Morten Ansgar Kveim	pulmonary medicine	sarcoidosis		intradermal injection of lymphatic extract from known sufferer; obsolete
Lachman maneuver	John Lachman	orthopedic surgery	anterior cruciate ligament injury		modified anterior drawer test with knee in less flexion
Ladin's sign	Louis Julius Ladin, Lithuanian-American Gynecologist, (1862–1951)	obstetrics	normal pregnancy	(needed)	softening of uterus; similar to Hegar's sign
Lancisi's sign	Giovanni Maria Lancisi	cardiology	tricuspid regurgitation		giant v-wave in seen in jugular vein
Landau–Kleffner syndrome	William Landau, Frank Kleffner	neurology, psychiatry	aphasia		aphasia and an abnormal EEG
Larrey's sign	Dominique Larrey	rheumatology	sacroiliitis		pain in sacroiliac area on sitting down on hard chair
Lasègue's sign	Charles Lasègue	neurosurgery, orthopaedic surgery	lumbar disc lesions, sciatica		better known as straight leg raise test
Leopold's maneuver	Christian Gerhard Leopold	obstetrics		Leopold's maneuver at Whonamedit?	determination of fetal lie
Leser–Trélat sign	Edmund Leser, Ulysse Trélat	oncology	malignant neoplasm	Leser-Trélat sign at Whonamedit?	sudden onset of multiple pruritic seborrheic keratoses
Levine's sign	Samuel A. Levine	cardiology	myocardial infarction		patient clenches fist over chest when asked to describe pain
Lhermitte's sign	Jean Lhermitte	neurology	lesions of cervical cord dorsal columns or caudal medulla, MS, chemotherapy, Behçet's disease		electrical sensation down the back and into limbs with neck flexion or extension
Liebermeister's rule	Carl von Liebermeister	internal medicine		Liebermeister's rule at Whonamedit?	For each fever degree Celsius an increase of 8 beats per minute in cardiac frequency
Lisch nodule	Karl Lisch	ophthalmology	type I neurofibromatosis		yellow brown hamartomata on iris
Lisker's sign	?	internal medicine	deep venous thrombosis	(needed)	tenderness on percussion of antero-medial tibia
Litten's sign	Moritz Litten	cardiology	infective endocarditis	eMedicine	cotton-wool exudate in the retina
Lombard effect	Étienne Lombard	psychiatry	malingering due to simulated deafness		automatic rise in the loudness of a person's voice when they speak in noise
Louvel's sign	?	internal medicine	deep venous thrombosis	(needed)	increased pain along vein with Valsalva; proximal pressure prevents this
Lowenberg's sign	Robert I. Lowenberg	vascular medicine	deep vein thrombosis	(needed)	immediate pain on inflating blood pressure cuff around calf
MacDonald triad	John M. MacDonald	psychiatry	sociopathic personality disorder		enuresis, firesetting and animal torture predictive of future criminal behaviour
Macewen's sign	Sir William Macewen	neurology, neurosurgery	hydrocephalus, brain abscess		resonance on percussion of fronto-temporo-parietal suture
Magnan's sign	Valentin Magnan	addiction medicine	cocaine dependence	Magnan's sign at Whonamedit?	feeling of moving foreign body under the skin
Mantoux test	Charles Mantoux	infectious disease	tuberculosis		intradermal protein derivative – diameter of wheal evaluated
Marcus Gunn pupil	Robert Marcus Gunn	ophthalmology, neurology	severe retinal disease, lesion of optic nerve anterior to chiasm	Gunn's pupillary phenomenon at Whonamedit?	Relative pupil dilatation when light swings to the affected side
Markle's sign	George Bushar Markle IV	surgery	appendicitis	(needed)	RLQ pain on dropping from standing on toes to heels
Massouh's sign	Farouk Massouh	surgery	appendicitis	(needed)	grimace of the patient upon a right sided (and not left) sweep.
Mayne's sign	?	cardiology	aortic insufficiency	(needed)	diastolic blood pressure drop of >15mmHg on raising arm
McBurney's point	Charles McBurney	surgery	appendicitis		2/3 of the way lateral on a line from umbilicus to anterior superior iliac spine (corresponds to junction of vermiform appendix and cecum)
McConnell's sign	M.V. McConnell	cardiology	pulmonary embolism		echocardiography finding of akinesia of the mid-free wall of the right ventricle but normal motion of the apex
McMurray test	Thomas Porter McMurray	orthopaedics	meniscal tear	McMurray's sign at Whonamedit?	knee extended, valgus stress applied, leg rotated produces palpable or audible click
Means–Lerman scratch	J. Lerman, J.H. Means	endocrinology	hyperthyroidism		systolic heart murmur similar to pericardial rub
Mees' lines	R.A. Mees	toxicology	arsenic or heavy metal poisoning		transverse white lines across the nails
Meigs' syndrome	Joe Vincent Meigs	gynecology	ascites with hydrothorax	Meigs' syndrome: the history of the eponym	Triad of ascites, hydrothorax and benign ovarian tumor
Mellinghoff's sign	Karl Hermann Mellinghoff, German Endocrinologist, (1908–1967)	hyperbaric medicine	cutaneous decompression sickness		coughing or Valsalve accentuates the venous markings of an erysipeloid rash
Mentzer index	William C. Mentzer Jr.	hematology	microcytic anemia		differentiates iron deficiency anaemia from beta thalassaemia
Miller Fisher test	C. Miller Fisher	neurology	normal pressure hydrocephalus		Improvement in cognitive function after withdrawal of CSF during lumbar puncture used to confirm diagnosis
Moniz sign	António Egas Moniz	neurology	pyramidal tract lesions	The Babinski sign – a reappraisal Neurol India 48 (4): 314–8.	forceful plantar flexion of the ankle elicits an extensor plantar response
Möbius sign	Paul Julius Möbius	endocrinology	thyrotoxicosis	Möbius sign at TheFreeDictionary.com	inability to maintain convergence of eyes
Muehrcke's lines	Robert C. Muehrcke	nephrology, oncology	hypoalbuminaemia, chemotherapy		paired transverse white lines on nail bed
Mulder's sign	Jacob D. Mulder	neurology, podiatry	Morton's neuroma		transverse compression of the forefoot elicits pain in the distribution of the affected nerve
Müller's maneuver	Johannes Peter Müller	pulmonology	collapsed section of airway		patient attempts to breathe in with nose and mouth closed (opposite of Valsalva maneuver)
Müller's sign	Friedrich von Müller	cardiology	aortic insufficiency	Müller's sign at Whonamedit?	visible pulsation or bobbing of uvula
Murphy's punch sign	John B. Murphy	urology	perinephric abscess	Murphy's punch at Whonamedit?	punch tenderness at the costovertebral angle
Murphy's sign	John B. Murphy	surgery	cholecystitis	Murphy's sign at Whonamedit?	hesitation on inspiration while gall bladder is palpated
Myerson's sign	Abraham Myerson	neurology	Parkinson's disease		inability to resist blinking when glabella is percussed
Naegele's rule	Franz Karl Naegele	gynecology	gestation		method of estimating due date
Nardi test	George Nardi	gastroenterology	dysfunction of sphincter of Oddi		administration of morphine and neostigmine reproduces sharp LUQ pain; not in general use
Nikolsky's sign	Pyotr Nikolsky	dermatology	various, including pemphigus vulgaris		shearing of epidermis under pressure
O'Brien's test	?			https://mskmedicine.com/clinical_skills/obriens-test/	Assesses the integrity of the glenoid labrum and AC joint
O'Donoghue's triad	D. O'Donoghue	orthopaedics, sports medicine	knee injury		coincidence of anterior cruciate injury, medial collateral injury and meniscal tear
Oliver's sign	William Silver Oliver	cardiology	aortic arch aneurysm		caudal movement of trachea with systole
Oppenheim's sign	Hermann Oppenheim	neurology	pyramidal tract lesions	Oppenheim's reflex at Whonamedit?	irritation downward of the medial tibia causes dorsiflexion of big toe
Ortolani test	Marino Ortolani	pediatrics & orthopedics	congenital hip dislocation	Ortolani's sign and test at Whonamedit?	palpable clunk on moving hip
Osborn wave	John Jay Osborn	cardiology, emergency medicine	hypothermia		positive deflection at QRS-ST junction
Osler's node	Sir William Osler	internal medicine	various, including SBE and SLE		painful red lesions on the pads of the fingers and plantar surfaces
Osler's sign	Sir William Osler	internal medicine	atherosclerosis		falsely elevated bp reading due to incompressibility of calcified vessels
Palla's sign	Antonio Palla	internal medicine	pulmonary embolism	Pulmonary embolism at Merck Manual online	enlarged right descending pulmonary artery on chest x-ray
Pastia's sign	Constantin Chessec Pastia	pediatrics	scarlet fever	Pastia's sign at Whonamedit?	lines of confluent petechiae in skin creases (associated with Scarlatiniform rash and strep pyogenes)
Patrick's test	Hugh Talbot Patrick	rheumatology	sacroiliitis	Patrick's test at Whonamedit?	external rotation of the hip causes pain
Peabody's sign	C.N. Peabody	internal medicine	deep vein thrombosis		calf muscle spasm when raising the affected leg with the foot extended
Pemberton's sign	Hugh Pemberton	thoracic surgery	retrosternal mass with superior vena cava syndrome		arms elevated over head elicits facial plethora, distended neck veins and inspiratory stridor
Phalen's maneuver	George S. Phalen	rheumatology, hand surgery	carpal tunnel syndrome		30–60 seconds of full forced flexion of wrist elicits symptoms
Piskaček's sign	Ludwig Piskaček	obstetrics	normal pregnancy	Piskaçek's sign at Whonamedit?	palpable lateral bulge at tubal-uterine junction; present at 7–8 weeks
Plummer's nail	Henry Stanley Plummer	endocrinology	thyrotoxicosis	Plummer's nail at Whonamedit?	onycholysis especially of ring and little fingers
Pratt's sign	Gerald H. Pratt	internal medicine	deep venous thrombosis		pain elicited by compression of posterior calf
Prehn's sign	Douglas T. Prehn	urology	testicular torsion		no pain relief with lifting the affected testicle suggests testicular torsion
Queckenstedt's maneuver	Hans Heinrich Georg Queckenstedt	neurology	spinal stenosis	Queckenstedt's phenomenon at Whonamedit?	bilateral jugular vein pressure during lumbar puncture causes sudden rise in CSF pressure
Quincke's sign	Heinrich Irenaeus Quincke	cardiology	aortic insufficiency	Quincke's capillary pulse at Whonamedit?	visible pulsation in ungual capillary bed
Reynolds' pentad	B.M. Reynolds	gastroenterology	ascending cholangitis	Reynold's pentad at Whonamedit?	Charcot's triad + hypotension and altered mental state
Riesman's sign	David Riesman	endocrinology	thyrotoxicosis		bruit over globe of the eye
Rigler's sign	Leo George Rigler	radiology, abdominal surgery	pneumoperitoneum	Rigler's sign at Whonamedit?	gas outlines both mucosal and serosal surfaces of bowel
Rinne test	Heinrich Adolf Rinne	ENT, neurology, audiometry	hearing impairment	Rinne's test at Whonamedit?	comparison of air conduction to bone conduction differentiates sensorineural from conductive deafness
Romaña's sign	Cecilio Romaña	tropical medicine	Chagas' disease	Romaña's sign at Whonamedit?	painless unilateral periorbital swelling
Romberg test	Moritz Heinrich Romberg	neurology	dorsal column lesions, cerebllar lesions, alcohol intoxication	Romberg's sign at Whonamedit?	inability to maintain posture with eyes closed
Rose's sign	?	vascular medicine	deep vein thrombosis	(needed)	Warm, stiff feeling of skin when affected leg is pinched
Rosenbach's test	Ottomar Rosenbach	clinical chemistry	bilirubinuria	Rosenbach's test at Whonamedit?	colour produced on addition of nitric acid
Rosenstein's sign	Paul Rosenstein	general surgery	appendicitis	Advances in Pediatrics. JP Medical Ltd. p. 1432. ISBN 978-93-5025-777-7.	tenderness in the right lower quadrant increases when the patient moves from the supine position to a recumbent posture on the left side
Rossolimo's sign	Grigory Ivanovich Rossolimo	neurology	pyramidal tract lesions	The Babinski sign – a reappraisal Neurol India 48 (4): 314–8.	percussion of the tips of the toes causes exaggerated flexion of the toes
Rotch sign	Thomas Morgan Rotch	cardiology	pericardial effusion	Rotch sign. (n.d.) Medical Dictionary for the Health Professions and Nursing. (2012). Retrieved 6 September 2023 from https://medical-dictionary.thefreedictionary.com/Rotch+sign	percussion dullness in the fifth intercostal space on the right
Roth's spots	Moritz Roth	ophthalmology, internal medicine	various, including SBE and systemic vasculitides	Roth's spot at Whonamedit?	retinal haemorrhages with pale centres seen at fundoscopy
Rovsing's sign	Niels Thorkild Rovsing	general surgery	appendicitis	Rovsing's sign at Whonamedit?	palpation of LLQ elicits pain in RLQ
Rumpel–Leede sign	Theodor Rumpel, Carl Stockbridge Leede	haematology	capillary fragility	Rumpel-Leede test at Whonamedit?	petechiae seen after compression by tourniquet
Russell's sign	Gerald Russell	psychiatry	bulimia nervosa		scarring of the dorsum of one hand (contact with incisors when purging)
Salus's sign	Robert Salus	ophthalmology	hypertension	Hypertension at Medscape	deflection of retinal veins at right angle junctions due to elongation or shortening of connected arterioles
Schaeffer's sign	Max Schaeffer	neurology	pyramidal tract lesions	Schäffer's reflex at Whonamedit?	squeezing the Achilles tendon elicits an extensor plantar response
Schamroth's window test	Leo Schamroth	pulmonology, cardiology	chronic hypoxia		identifies clubbing of distal phalanges
Schiller's test	Walter Schiller	gynecology	cervical cancer	Schiller's test at Whonamedit?	affected areas of cervix fail to stain brown with iodine solution
Schilling test	Robert F. Schilling	internal medicine	pernicious anaemia, coeliac disease, other malabsorption disorders		B12 radioassay; rare
Schirmer's test	Otto Schirmer	ophthalmology	keratoconjunctivitis sicca, as in Sjögren's syndrome		quantifies lacrimal secretion
Schober test	Paul Schober	physiatry, rheumatology, orthopaedics	various disorders of lumbar vertebrae	Schober's sign at Whonamedit?	quantifies lumbar flexion
Sherren's triangle	James Sherren	surgery	appendicitis	Sherren's triangle at Whonamedit?	area of hyperaesthesia over the right lower abdomen
Shone's complex	John D. Shone	cardiology	congenital heart defect		supravalvular mitral ring, parachute deformity of mitral valve, subaortic stenosis and coarctation of the aorta
Siegrist streaks	August Siegrist	ophthalmology	malignant hypertension		hyperpigmented streaks parallel to choroidal vessels
Simmonds' test	Franklin Adin Simmonds	orthopaedics	Achilles tendon rupture		squeezing of calf fails to produce plantar flexion
Sims–Huhner test	Harry M. Sims, Max Huhner	reproductive medicine	infertility	Sims-Huhner test at Whonamedit?	determination of sperm count and motility in a sample taken from the cervical canal within an hour of intercourse
Sister Mary Joseph nodule	Sister Mary Joseph Dempsey (born Julia Dempsey)	oncology	various abdominal malignancies		palpable lymph node in the umbilicus
Spurling's test	Roy Glenwood Spurling	neurology	cervical radiculopathy	Spurling's manoeuvre and sign at Whonamedit?	axial compression and rotation of cervical spine to the side of symptoms causes pain
Stellwag's sign	Karl Stellwag von Carion	endocrinology	thyrotoxicosis		infrequent and/or incomplete blinking, accompanied by Dalrymple's sign
Still's murmur	Sir George Frederick Still	paediatric cardiology	subaortic stenosis, small Ventricular septal defect	Still's mmurmur at Whonamedit?	systolic ejection sound; vibratory/musical; best heard at left lower sternal border
Stransky's sign	?	neurology	pyramidal tract lesions	The Babinski sign – a reappraisal Neurol India 48 (4): 314–18.	sudden abduction and release of little toe causes extensor plantar response
Stroop test	John Ridley Stroop	neuropsychology	various, including ADHD and schizophrenia		reaction times for incongruent stimuli (e.g., word red printed in blue)
Strümpell's sign	Adolph Strümpell	neurology	spastic pareses of the lower extremity	Strümpell's sign I at Whonamedit?	failure of abrupt passive flexion of the hip and/or knee to elicit dorsiflexion and adduction of foot
Ten Horn's sign	Carel Hendrik Leo Herman ten Horn	surgery	appendicitis		pain in the right iliac fossa after traction of spermatic cord
Terry's nails	R. Terry	internal medicine	various including hepatic failure		white 'ground glass' nails;absence of lunula
Terry Thomas sign	Terry-Thomas	Orthopaedics	Scapho-lunate dissociation	Atlas of Signs in Musculoskeletal Radiology	Gap between the scaphoid and lunate bones on AP wrist radiograph
Thomas test	Hugh Owen Thomas	Orthopaedics	Fixed flexion deformity of hip		Supine patient flexes one hip whilst keeping other leg flat; back arches if flexion deformity is present
Throckmorton's reflex	Tom Bentley Throckmorton	neurology	pyramidal tract lesions	The Babinski sign – a reappraisal Neurol India 48 (4): 314–8.	pressure over dorsal big toe MTP joint elicits an extensor plantar response
Tinel's sign	Jules Tinel	neurology	neuritis, compression disorders		'DTP' – distal tingling on percussion
Todd's paresis	Robert Bentley Todd	neurology	seizure disorders		focal weakness for as much as 48 hours after seizure
Traube's sign	Ludwig Traube	various	splenomegaly		dull percussion sound over Traube's space
Trendelenburg's sign	Friedrich Trendelenburg	neurology	inferior gluteal palsy, other causes of hip abductors weakness		pelvic tilt contralateral to 'stance leg'
Troisier's sign	Charles Emile Troisier	internal medicine, oncology	Various abdominal malignancies, especially stomach cancer	Troisier's node or sign at Whonamedit?	Enlargement of the left supraclavicular lymph node (=Virchow's node)
Trousseau's sign of malignancy	Armand Trousseau	internal medicine	various malignancies, including pancreatic		spontaneous thrombosis of multiple veins, including portal circulation
Trousseau's sign of latent tetany	Armand Trousseau	internal medicine, endocrinology	hypocalcaemia	Trendelenburg's phenomenon at Whonamedit?	in hypocalcaemia, occlusion of brachial artery induces carpal spasm
Uhthoff's phenomenon	Wilhelm Uhthoff	neurology	multiple sclerosis	Uhthoff's symptom at Whonamedit?	↑ in neurological symptoms with exercise or other increase in body temperature
Unterberger test	Siegfried Unterberger	neurology, ENT	vestibular lesions		patient walks in place with eyes closed;direction of rotation indicates vestibular lesion on that side
Virchow's node	Rudolf Virchow	internal medicine, oncology	Various abdominal malignancies, especially stomach cancer	Virchow's node at Whonamedit?	Enlargement of the left supraclavicular lymph node (=Troisier's sign)
Virchow's triad	Rudolf Virchow	hematology	etiology of thrombosis		Hypercoagulability, Hemodynamic changes (stasis, turbulence) and Endothelial injury/dysfunction
Von Braun-Fernwald's sign	Karl von Braun-Fernwald	obstetrics	pregnancy		softening of the uterine fundus at the site of implantation at 4–5 weeks gestation
Von Graefe sign	Albrecht von Graefe	endocrinology	Graves' disease		' lid lag'; immobility of upper lid on downward gaze
Wada test	Juhn Atsushi Wada	neurology	epilepsy, anatomical lesions of cerebrum	Wada's test at Whonamedit?	short acting barbiturate injected in internal carotid; lateralizes language function
Waddell's signs	G. Waddell	primary care, psychiatry	chronic pain		identify non-organic sources of low back pain
Waddell's triad	J.P. Waddell	paediatric trauma	child pedestrian struck by motor vehicle		Head trauma, thoracic and/or abdominal trauma, femoral fracture
Watson's water hammer pulse	Sir Thomas Watson, 1st Baronet	cardiology	aortic regurgitation	J. Suvarna Watson's water hammer pulse Journal of Postgraduate Medicine 2008-04-01	bounding forceful pulse elicited with postural manoeuvres
Wellens' sign or warning	Hein Wellens	cardiology	severe stenosis of LAD		characteristic ekg changes
Wernicke encephalopathy	Carl Wernicke	neurology, psychiatry	thiamine deficiency		neurological symptoms caused by biochemical lesions of the central nervous system after exhaustion of B-vitamin reserves, in particular thiamine
Wernicke–Korsakoff syndrome	Carl Wernicke, Sergei Korsakoff	neurology, psychiatry	Wernicke encephalopathy, Korsakoff syndrome		combined presence of Wernicke encephalopathy (WE) and Korsakoff syndrome
Westermark sign	Nils Westermark	pulmonology	pulmonary embolism		Area of oligaemia on chest x-ray
Whipple's triad	Allen Whipple	endocrinology	hypoglycemia		1.symptoms associated with hypoglycaemia 2. measured low serum glucose 3. relief of symptoms with administration of glucose p.o. or iv
Wickham's striae	Louis Frédéric Wickham	dermatology	lichen planus		white or greyish lines on the lichen planus lesions
Widal test	Georges-Fernand Widal	microbiology	enteric fever		serum agglutination; obsolete(?)
Winterbottom's sign	Thomas Masterman Winterbottom	tropical medicine	trypanosomiasis		posterior cervical chain adenopathy
Wolff–Parkinson–White triad	Sir John Parkinson, Paul Dudley White, Louis Wolff	cardiology	supraventricular tachycardia	Wolff-Parkinson-White syndrome at Whonamedit?	pre-excitation on ECG
Wright's maneuver	?			(needed)	
Yeoman's test	?	rheumatology	sacroiliitis	(needed)	sacroiliac pain on rotation of ilium and extension of hip
Yergason's test	?	orthopedic surgery	bicipital tendinitis		anterior shoulder pain with resisted supination of the forearm

Numerous additional signs can be found for Graves disease under Graves' ophthalmopathy.

== See also ==
- Medical eponyms
- Pathognomonic
- List of medical triads and pentads
