= Jendrassik =

Jendrassik is a surname. Notable people with the surname include:

- Ernő Jendrassik (1858–1921), Hungarian physician
- György Jendrassik (1898–1954), Hungarian physicist and mechanical engineer
- Jenő Jendrassik (1860–1919), Hungarian painter

== See also ==
- Jendrassik Cs-1, was the world's first working turboprop engine
- Jendrassik maneuver, Medical treatment
