= Sherren =

Sherren is a surname. Notable people with the surname include:

- Graham Sherren (born 1937), British publisher
- James Sherren (1872–1945), British surgeon
  - Sherren's triangle, an area of skin hyperaesthesia found in acute appendicitis

== See also ==
- Sherrer
