= Salus (disambiguation) =

Salus may refer to:

- Salus, Roman goddess of health and prosperity
- Salus, Iran, a village in West Azerbaijan Province, Iran
- Salus University, in Elkins Park, Pennsylvania, the United States
- Peter H. Salus, linguist, computer scientist
- Robert Salus (born 1877), Austrian ophthalmologist
- Hugo Salus (born 1866) German-language writer, poet, and doctor, Prague, Czechoslovakia
- Agua Mineral Salus, a brand of bottled mineral water of the Salus company, Uruguay
- Samuel W. Salus (1872-1945), American lawyer and politician
