= Joffroy =

Joffroy is a surname. Notable people with the surname include:

- Alix Joffroy (1844–1908), French neurologist and psychiatrist remembered for describing Joffroy's sign
- Pierre Joffroy (born 1929), French author, dramaturge and journalist who writes for Paris Match, Libération and L'Express

== See also ==
- Joffroy's sign, clinical sign in which there is a lack of wrinkling of the forehead when a patient looks up with the head bent forwards
