= Frank Crow =

Frank Crow is the name of:

- Frank Fools Crow (died 1989), Oglala Lakota spiritual leader, Yuwipi medicine man, and the nephew of Black Elk
- Frank Crowe (1882–1946), chief engineer of the Hoover Dam
- Frank W. Crowe (1919–1987), American physician
- Franklin C. Crow, computer graphics researcher
