= Thomas McMurray =

Thomas McMurray may refer to:

- Thomas McMurray (sportsman), Irish cricketer and footballer
- Thomas S. McMurray, mayor of Denver, Colorado
- Thomas Porter McMurray, British orthopaedic surgeon
