= Bodansky =

People with the surname Bodansky include:

- Artur Bodanzky (1877–1939), Austrian-American conductor
- Laís Bodanzky (born 1969), Brazilian film director
- Robert Bodanzky (1879–1923), Austrian journalist, playwright and poet
- Yossef Bodansky, Israeli-American political scientist
- Aaron Bodansky (1887–1960), Russian-born American biochemist
