= William Ewart =

William Ewart may refer to:

- William Ewart (British politician) (1798–1869), Member of Parliament between 1828 and 1868
- William Ewart (physician) (1848–1929), English physician
- William Dana Ewart, founder of Link-Belt Machinery Company in 1880
- Sir William Ewart, 1st Baronet (1817–1889), MP for Belfast
- Ivan Ewart (Sir William Ivan Cecil Ewart, 6th Baronet, 1919–1995), Northern Irish naval officer, businessman and charity worker
- William Ewart Gladstone (1809–1898), British Liberal politician, Prime Minister (1868–74, 1880–85, 1886, 1892–94)
