= Lutheran antigen system =

Human blood group system

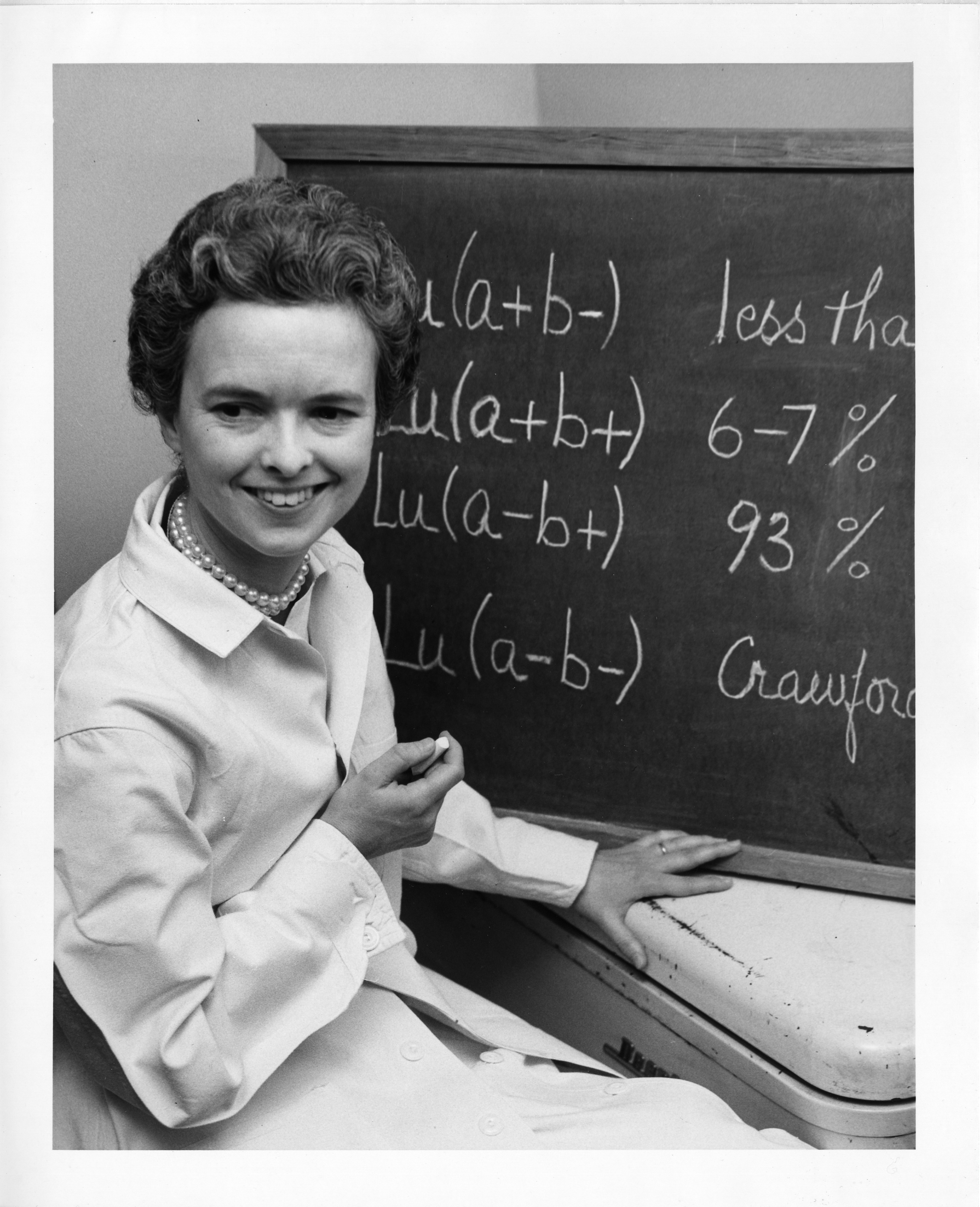
Physician Mary N. Crawford worked at the Serum Exchange of the Children's Hospital of Philadelphia, where, in 1962, she discovered that she was one of a few people in the world with the rare blood type Lu (a−b−) and that her blood might be donated to a patient in Great Britain.

The Lutheran antigen systems is a classification of human blood based on the presence of substances called Lutheran antigens on the surfaces of red blood cells. There are 19 known Lutheran antigens. The name Lutheran stems from a blood donor's last name, variously spelled "Lutteran" or "Lutheran". All of these antigens arise from variations in a gene called BCAM (basal cell adhesion molecule). The system is based on the expression of two codominant alleles, designated Lua and Lub. The antigens Aua and Aub, known as the Auberger antigens, were once thought to make up a separate blood group but were later shown to be Lutheran antigens arising from variations in the BCAM gene.

The phenotypes Lu(a+b−) and Lu(a+b+) are found at various frequencies within populations. The Lu(a−b+) phenotype is the most common in all populations, whereas the Lu(a−b−) phenotype is uncommon. Though present in the fetus, it is seldom the cause of erythroblastosis fetalis or of transfusion reactions.

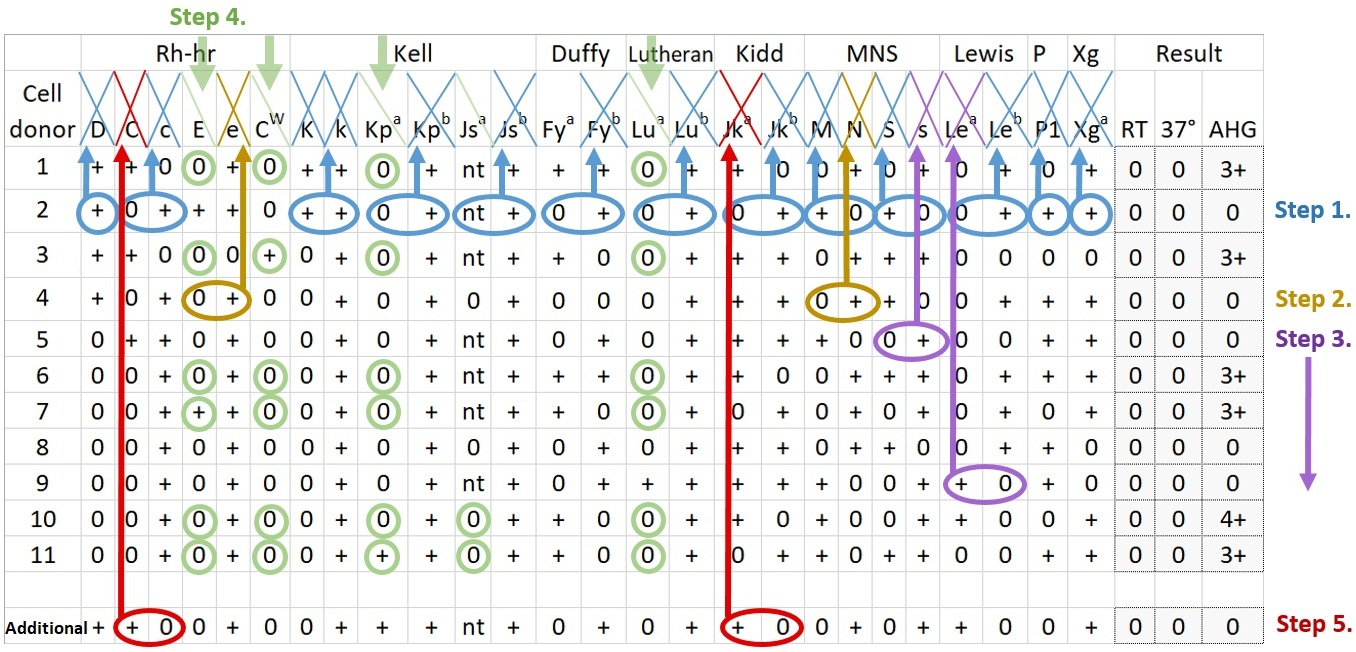
Interpretation of antibody panel to detect patient antibodies towards the most relevant human blood group systems, including Lutheran.

== Clinical diagnostic ==
Clinical testing in patient care for Lutheran antigens follows published minimum quality and operational requirements, similar to red cell genotyping for any of the other recognized blood group systems. Molecular analysis can identify gene variants (alleles) that may affect Lutheran antigens expression on the red cell membrane.
