= Pratt Test =

- Purpose: check for deep vein thrombosis

The Pratt Test is a simple test to check for deep vein thrombosis in the leg. It involves having the patient lie supine with the leg bent at the knee, grasping the calf with both hands and pressing on the popliteal vein in the proximal calf. If the patient feels pain, it is a sign that a deep vein thrombosis exists.

== See also ==
- Pratt's sign
