= Comby sign =

- Differential diagnosis: measles

The Comby sign is a clinical sign of early measles in which thin, whitish patches are seen on the gums and buccal mucosa due to desquamation of epithelial cells.

The sign is named after Jules Comby.
