= Grisel's syndrome =

- Specialty: Rheumatology

Grisel's syndrome is a non-traumatic subluxation of the atlanto-axial joint caused by inflammation of the adjacent tissues. This is a rare disease that usually affects children. Progressive throat and neck pain and neck stiffness can be followed by neurologic symptoms such as pain or numbness radiating to arms (radiculopathies). In extreme cases, the condition can lead to quadriplegia and even death from acute respiratory failure. The condition often follows soft tissue inflammation in the neck such as in cases of upper respiratory tract infections, peritonsillar or retropharyngeal abscesses. Post-operative inflammation after certain procedures such as adenoidectomy can also lead to this condition in susceptible individuals such as those with Down syndrome.

== Pathophysiology ==
Pathophysiology of this disease consists of relaxation of the transverse ligament of the atlanto-axial joint.

== Diagnosis ==
Diagnosis can be established using plain film x-rays as well as CT scan of the neck/cervical spine. Children with Down syndrome have inherently lax ligaments making them susceptible to this condition. In select cases, these children may require pre-operative imaging to assess the risk for complications after procedures such as adenoidectomy.

== Treatment ==
Treatment includes anti-inflammatory medications and immobilization of the neck in addition to treatment of the offending infectious cause (if any) with appropriate antibiotics. Early treatment is crucial to prevent long-term sequelae. Surgical fusion may be required for residual instability of the joint.
