= Jacques-Joseph Grancher =

French pediatrician (1843–1907)

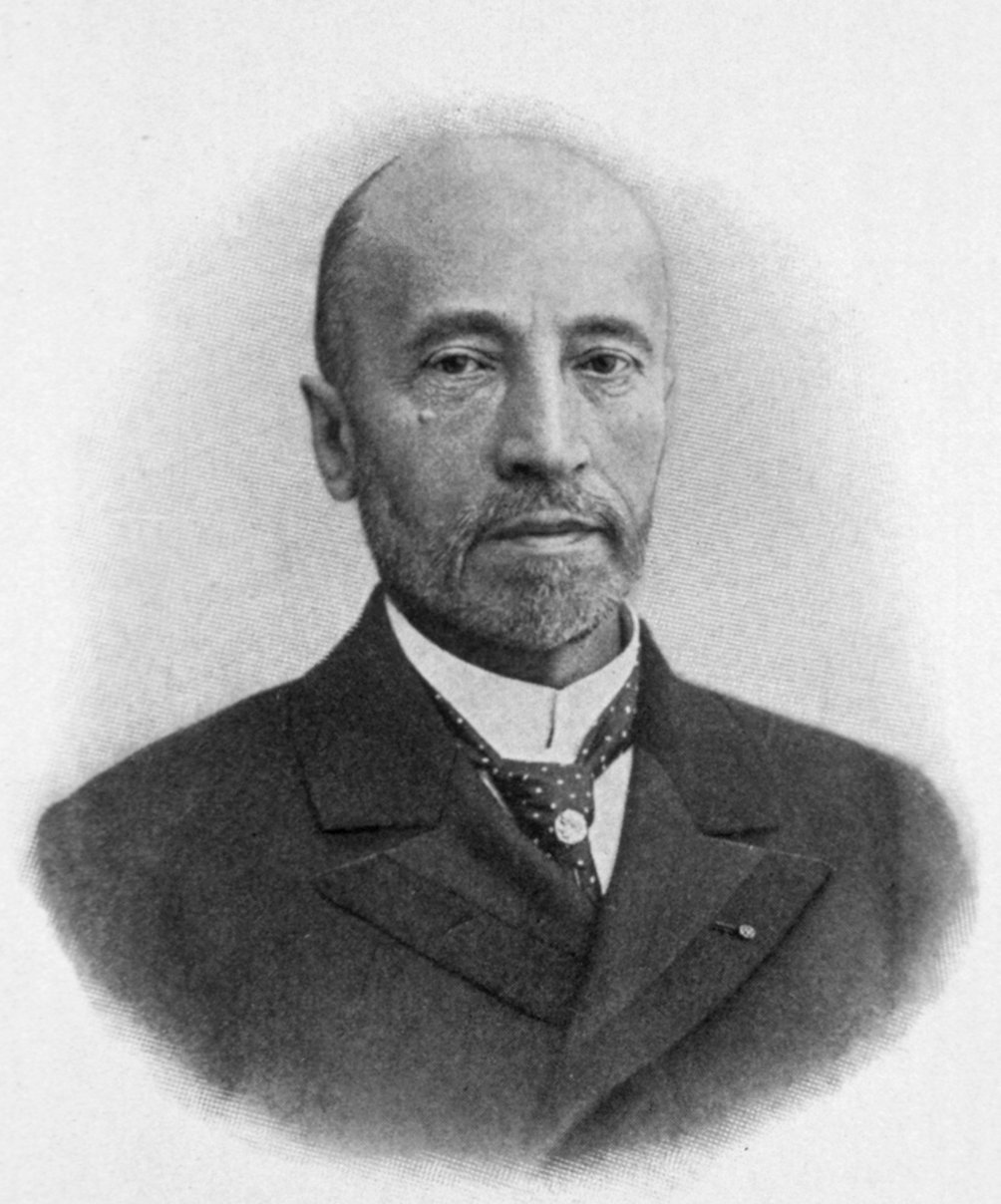
Jacques-Joseph Grancher

Jacques-Joseph Grancher (French pronunciation: [ʒɑk ʒozɛf ɡʁɑ̃ʃe]; 29 September 1843 in Felletin, Creuse – 13 July 1907) was a French pediatrician born in Felletin.

In 1862 he began his medical studies in Paris, where he worked as an assistant at the Hôpital des Enfants Malades (under Eugène Bouchut), the Hôpital de la Charité, the Hôpital de la Pitié and Lariboisière Hospital (under Paul Jules Tillaux). He learned histological techniques with Louis-Antoine Ranvier and Victor André Cornil in their private laboratory on Rue Christine, and for several years served as director of a pathological anatomy laboratory in Clamart (1868–1878). From 1885 until his death in 1907, he was director of Hôpital des Enfants Malades. In 1900 he was elected vice-chairman of the board of directors at the Pasteur Institute.

Grancher is remembered for his research of tuberculosis. He was a pioneer in the creation of safeguards for the prevention of childhood tuberculosis, and was an advocate of isolation and antisepsis in the fight against the disease. In 1897 with Jules Comby (1853–1947) and Antoine Marfan (1858–1942), he published "Traité des maladies de l’enfance" (Treatise of the Diseases of Childhood).

In 1885, Grancher and Alfred Vulpian (1826–1887) were instrumental in convincing Louis Pasteur (1822–1895) to perform the first successful vaccination against rabies on Joseph Meister, a 9-year-old boy who had been mauled by a rabid dog. In 1887 at the request of Pasteur, Grancher defended the rabies vaccination to the Académie de Médecine, citing its successful survival rate.
