= Antoine Marfan =

French pediatrician (1858–1942)

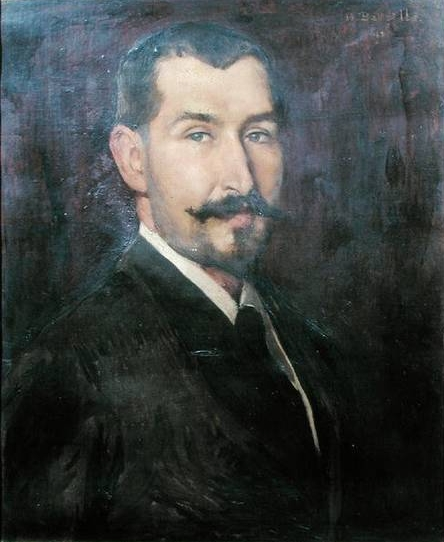
Antoine Marfan; portrait by Henry Bataille

Antoine Bernard-Jean Marfan (French pronunciation: [ɑ̃twan bɛʁnaʁ ʒɑ̃ maʁfɑ̃]; June 23, 1858 – February 11, 1942) was a French paediatrician.

He was born in Castelnaudary (département Aude, Languedoc-Roussillon) to Antoine Prosper Marfan and Adélaïde Thuries. He began his medical studies in Toulouse, where he stayed for two years before moving to Paris. He graduated in 1886, his education having been interrupted by a period of military service. In 1903, he became a professor of infantile hygiene in the paediatric clinic of the University of Paris. During the same year, he became a member of the Académie de Médecine.

In 1896, Marfan described a hereditary disorder of connective tissue that was to become known as Marfan syndrome, the term first being used by Henricus Jacobus Marie Weve (1888–1962) of Utrecht in 1931. Today, it is thought that Marfan's patient (a five-year-old girl named Gabrielle) was affected by a condition known as congenital contractural arachnodactyly, and not Marfan's syndrome.

Further eponymous medical conditions named after Antoine Marfan include:

- Dennie–Marfan syndrome
- Marfan's hypermobility syndrome
- Marfan's law
- Marfan's sign
- Marfan's symptom
- Marfan–Madelung syndrome

Marfan also had interests in the paediatric aspects of tuberculosis, nutrition, and diphtheria. With Jacques-Joseph Grancher (1843–1907) and Jules Comby (1853–1947), he was co-author of Traité des maladies de l’enfance. From 1913 to 1922, he was publisher of the journal Le Nourrisson.
