= Joseph Meister =

First person to be inoculated against rabies (1885)

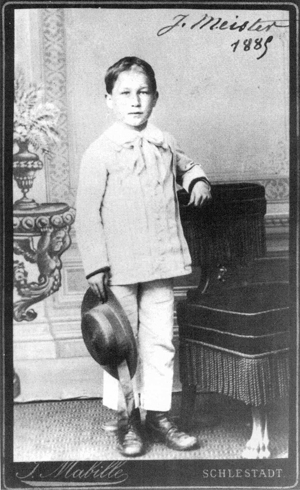
Joseph Meister in 1885

Joseph Meister (21 February 1876 – 24 June 1940) was the first person to be inoculated against rabies by Louis Pasteur, and likely the first person to be successfully treated for the infection, which has a >99% fatality rate once symptoms set in.

== History ==
In 1885, nine-year-old Meister was badly bitten by a supposedly rabid dog. After consulting with Alfred Vulpian and Jacques-Joseph Grancher and obtaining their assistance, Louis Pasteur agreed to inoculate the boy with spinal tissue from rabid rabbits, which he had successfully used to prevent rabies in dogs. The treatment was successful and the boy did not develop rabies. For Pasteur, this was technically practicing without a license as he was a chemist and not a licensed physician, but he proceeded on the advice of licensed colleagues who agreed that the youth needed the treatment and Pasteur was the only professional available to apply it. However, the success of the treatment led to any formal charges being waived.

As an adult, Meister served as a caretaker at the Pasteur Institute until his death in 1940 at age 64. On 24 June 1940, ten days after the German army occupied Paris during World War II, Meister died by suicide with his service gun or gas asphyxiation

Although often repeated, the version of his suicide stating he chose to take his life rather than allow the Wehrmacht to enter the Pasteurs' crypt is not sustainable. Instead, a contemporary journal article as well as the testimony of Meister's granddaughter indicate that, fearing for his family's safety, Meister asked them to leave, while he stayed behind to protect the Pasteur institute from the German soldiers. He incorrectly believed this had resulted in them being captured by the Nazis. His family returned to the institute a few hours after Meister died by suicide.

== Portrayals ==
Meister was played by Dickie Moore in the 1936 film The Story of Louis Pasteur. The story of Meister's potentially dangerous inoculation against rabies by Pasteur was also featured in an episode of the TV series Dark Matters: Twisted But True and the 1974 BBC drama-documentary series Microbes and Men.
