= Pratt's sign =

- Differential diagnosis: femoral deep vein thrombosis

Pratt's sign is an indication of femoral deep vein thrombosis. It is seen as the presence of dilated pretibial veins in the affected leg, which remain dilated on raising the leg.

The sign was described by American surgeon Gerald H. Pratt (1928–2006) of St. Vincent's Hospital in 1949.

This is not the same as the Pratt Test, which checks for a DVT by compressing a vein with the hands.
