= Morten Ansgar Kveim =

Norwegian pathologist

Morten Ansgar Kveim (27 December 1892 – 24 March 1966) was a Norwegian pathologist most remembered for describing the Kveim test.

Kveim was born in Gjerstad Municipality in Nedenes county, Norway. First starting in philology, he completed his medical training at the University of Oslo (1924). He qualified in medicine in 1925, and worked in private practice at a number of small towns in Norway. After 1929 he worked in the department of diseases of the skin in the Rikshospitalet in Oslo, becoming assistant physician in 1936.
