= Valentin Magnan =

French psychiatrist (1835–1916)

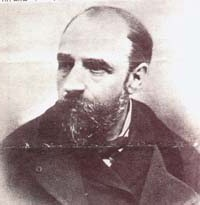
Valentin Magnan (1835-1916)

Valentin Magnan (16 March 1835 – 27 September 1916) was a French psychiatrist active in the 19th century.

== Biography ==
Valentin Magnan was a native of Perpignan. He studied medicine in Lyon and Paris, where he was a student of Jules Baillarger (1809–1890) and Jean-Pierre Falret (1794–1870). From 1867 to the end of his career he was associated with the Hôpital Sainte-Anne in Paris. At Sainte-Anne, he was a long-time colleague to Gustave Bouchereau (1835–1900).

Magnan was an influential figure in French psychiatry in the latter half of the 19th century. He is remembered for expanding the concept of degeneration that was first introduced into psychiatry by Bénédict Augustin Morel (1809–1873). Magnan's theory of degeneration was a form of "evolutionary biology" that was based on an hereditary precept. He used terms such as bouffée délirante (transitory delusional psychosis) and délire chronique évolution systématique (chronic systemized delusional disorder) as descriptive categories of mental illness. In 1892 with psychiatrist Paul Sérieux (1864–1947), he published a monograph on the latter mental state titled Le délire chronique a évolution systématique.

Magnan believed that the prodigious use of alcohol, particularly absinthe, was a major factor in what he perceived was a decline of French culture. In his investigations of absinthe he tried to establish a particular "absinthe effect" that wasn't present in other forms of alcohol, and suggested that the delirium of absinthe was different from delirium tremens experienced in alcoholism. In his research with laboratory animals, Magnan used essence of absinthe (wormwood), rather than the beverage itself, which contains only a small percentage of wormwood. From his experiments he observed that animals experienced epileptiform convulsions when exposed to concentrated levels of wormwood.

== Associated eponym ==
- "Magnan's sign": An illusory sensation of a crawling foreign body being beneath the skin; a paresthesia in the psychosis of cocaine addicts.

== Selected written works ==
- Étude expérimentale et clinique sur l'alcoolisme, alcool et absinthe; épilepsie absinthique, 1871
- De l'hémi-anesthésie, de la sensibilité générale et des sens dans l'alcoolisme chronique
- Gazette hebdomadaire de médecine et de chirurgie, 1873.
- De l'alcoolisme, des diverses formes de délire alcoolique at de leur traitement, 1874.
- Recherches sur les centres nerveux. Pathologie et physiologie pathologique, 1876
- Des anomalies, des aberrations et des perversions sexuelles, 1885.
