= Goodsall's rule =

Medical rule about anal fistulas

Goodsall's rule, developed in 1887, relates the external opening (in the perianal skin) of an anal fistula to its internal opening (in the anal canal). It states that if the perianal skin opening is posterior to the transverse anal line, the fistulous tract will open into the anal canal in the midline posteriorly, sometimes taking a curvilinear course. A perianal skin opening anterior to the transverse anal line (within 3 cm radius) is usually associated with a radial fistulous tract but if it is beyond the 3 cm radius it will take a curvilinear course and open in the midline posterioly.

Or in more direct terms, it means that anterior-opening fistulas tend to follow a simple, direct course if it is within the 3 cm radius, beyond which it takes a curving path and opens in poster midline. The posterior-opening fistulas may follow a devious, curving path with some even being horseshoe-shaped before opening in the posterior midline.

Fistulas can be described as anterior or posterior relating to a line drawn in the coronal plane across the anus, the so-called transverse anal line. Anterior fistulas will have a direct track into the anal canal. Posterior fistulas will have a curved track with their external opening lying in the posterior midline of the anal canal. An exception to the rule are anterior fistulas lying more than 3.75 cm from the anus, which may have a curved track (similar to posterior fistulas) that opens into the posterior midline of the anal canal.

According to a study on patients undergoing operations for cryptoglandular anal fistulas, 92.9% of fistulas within 1.5 cm followed the Goodsall rule, whereas only 47.4% followed it beyond 3.6 cm.

In situations where there are multiple anal fistulae, the course would be similar to that of posterior-opening fistulae because of branching and communication between these openings.

The investigation of choice for anal fistulas is magnetic resonance imaging (MRI). Fistulograms can be used to demonstrate the track of the fistula.

Goodsall's rule is named after David Henry Goodsall who described it in 1900.
