= Ewart's sign =

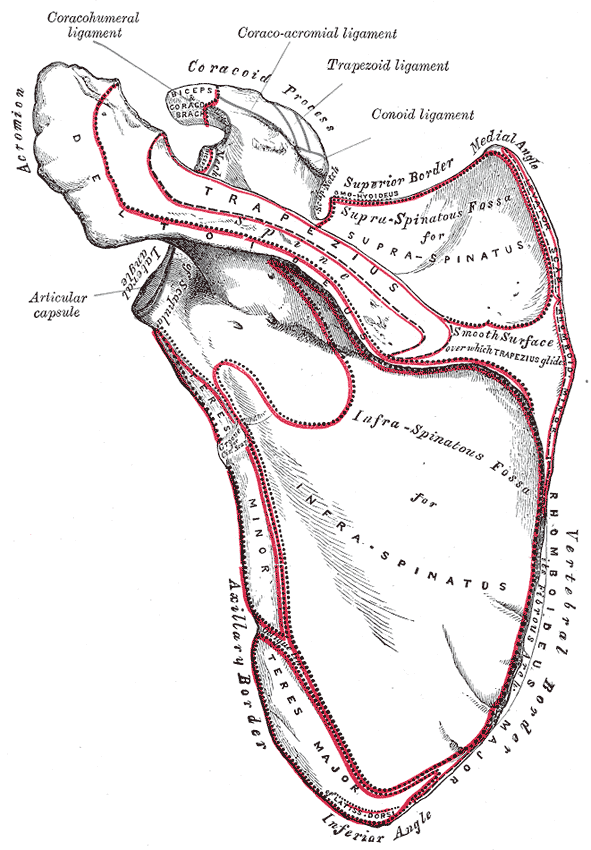
- Left scapula. Dorsal surface. (Ewart's sign below angle of the left scapula.)
- Differential diagnosis: Pericardial effusions

Ewart's sign is a set of findings on physical examination in people with large collections of fluid around their heart (pericardial effusions).

Dullness to percussion (described historically as "woody" in quality), egophony, and bronchial breath sounds may be appreciated at the inferior angle of the left scapula when the effusion is large enough to compress the left lower lobe of the lung, causing consolidation or atelectasis.

== Eponym ==
It was first described by William Ewart in 1896.
