= Nardi test =

- Purpose: test for dysfunction of the sphincter of Oddi,

The Nardi test, also known as the morphine-neostigmine provocation test, is a test for dysfunction of the sphincter of Oddi, a valve which divides the biliary tract from the duodenum. Two medications, morphine and neostigmine, are given to people with symptoms concerning for sphincter dysfunction, including sharp right-sided abdominal pain. If the pain is reproduced by the medications, then dysfunction is more likely. The test poorly predicts dysfunction, however, and is rarely used today. The Nardi test was named for George Nardi, who first described the procedure in 1966.
