= Dahl's sign =

- Differential diagnosis: Chronic obstructive pulmonary disease

Dahl's sign (also Thinker's sign or Target sign) is a clinical sign in which areas of darkened (hyperpigmentation) and thickened (hyperkeratotic) skin are seen on the lower thighs and elbows. It occurs in patients with longstanding severe chronic obstructive pulmonary disease.

The sign occurs because patients with COPD tend to sit forwards with their arms resting on their thighs, leading to chronic erythema of the skin at the points of contact. Over time, haemosiderin released from red blood cells trapped in the skin is released causing a brown discolouration of the skin.

Air trapping in the lungs of COPD patients causes the diaphragm to be pushed down and flattened, which reduces the effect of contraction of the diaphragm during inspiration. Sitting forwards pushes the abdominal contents upwards, increasing the curvature of the diaphragm and improving its effectiveness.

Bilateral cubital tunnel syndrome may also be found in patients with Dahl's sign.

Dahl's sign was described by K. V. Dahl in 1970.
