= Doi's sign =

- Differential diagnosis: Eaton-Lambert syndrome

Doi's sign is a clinical sign in which absent deep tendon reflexes can be elicited after a short period of maximal muscle contraction. This occurs in patients with Eaton-Lambert syndrome, but is not seen in patients with neuropathy.

The sign is named after Hitoka Doi, M.D., who described it in 1978.
