= Abelin reaction =

- Neosalvarsan
- Purpose: Detection of arsphenamine or neoarsphenamine
- Test of: Blood or urine

The Abelin reaction is a qualitative reaction for demonstrating the presence of arsphenamine and neoarsphenamine in blood and urine.

It is named for Isaak Abelin, Swiss physiologist.
