= George Henry Fox =

American dermatologist (1846–1937)

- Born: October 8, 1846; Ballston Spa, New York, United States
- Died: August 1, 1937 (aged 90); Manhattan, New York City, New York
- Education: University of Pennsylvania (M.D., 1869)
- Occupation: Dermatologist
- Years active: 1869—1937
- Known for: Fox's sign

George Henry Fox (8 October 1846 – 1 August 1937) was an American dermatologist, medical school professor and Civil War veteran.

== Biography ==
George Henry Fox was born on 8 October 1846 in Ballston Spa, New York.

He received his medical degree in 1869 from the University of Pennsylvania, and studied in Berlin, London, Paris and Vienna. He was professor of dermatology at the New York Medical College for Women, Starling Medical College in Columbus, Ohio, Columbia University and the New York Post-Graduate Medical School and Hospital.

He died on 1 August 1937 of a heart attack at his home, 145 East Fifty-fourth Street in Manhattan, New York City. His funeral was held at Universal Chapel on May 6, 1937.

== See also ==
- Fox–Fordyce disease
