= Addis count =

Urine test

- Test of: Urine

The Addis count is a urine test measuring urinary casts over time.

It is named for Thomas Addis.
