= Peabody's sign =

- Differential diagnosis: deep vein thrombosis

Peabody's sign is a clinical sign which may be found in patients with deep vein thrombosis (DVT). The sign is positive when calf muscle spasm occurs on raising the affected leg with the foot extended. The sign is neither sensitive nor specific for the presence of DVT.

The sign was described by C.N. Peabody in 1964.
