= Crowe sign =

Clinical sign for neurofibromatosis

The Crowe sign or Crowe's sign is the presence of axillary (armpit) freckling in people with neurofibromatosis type I (von Recklinghausen's disease). These freckles occur in up to 30% of people with the disease and their presence is one of six diagnostic criteria for neurofibromatosis. Freckles can also be present in the intertriginous area in neurofibromatosis, such as the inguinal fold, submammary areas, and nape of the neck.

This medical sign is named after Frank W. Crowe (July 2, 1919 – April 29, 1987), an American physician who practiced dermatology in Boise, Idaho. In 1956 Crowe et al. recognised the autosomal dominant heredity of neurofibromatosis and the use of 6 or more café au lait spots to diagnose the condition. In 1964 Crowe published work on the use of axillary freckling in its diagnosis, which is now referred to as the Crowe sign. He noticed that axillary freckles are present in about 20-30% of patients with neurofibromatosis, but he did not see any in patients who did not have neurofibromatosis.

Axillary freckling also occurs in other disease processes that closely resemble NF1, such as Legius syndrome (cafe-au-lait spots, axillary freckling, and macrocephaly without Lisch nodules, neurofibromas or CNS tumors), and, homozygous HNPCC mutations (cafe-au-lait spots, axillary freckling, and cutaneous neurofibromas in the setting of Hereditary Non-Polyposis Colon Cancer, also known as Lynch syndrome; seen with family history of HNPCC and consanguinity).
