= Siegrist streaks =

- Differential diagnosis: hypertensive choroidopathy

Siegrist streaks are a rare manifestation of hypertensive choroidopathy. They are described as hyper-pigmented flecks that are arranged in a linear fashion along the choroidal vessels of the eye.

Although they are usually indicative of fibrinoid necrosis associated with malignant hypertension, Siegrist streaks also occur in patients with temporal arteritis. They are named after Swiss ophthalmologist, August Siegrist (1865–1947).
