= Kveim test =

- Synonyms: Kveim-Siltzbach test
- MeSH: D007731

The Kveim test, Nickerson-Kveim or Kveim-Siltzbach test is a skin test used to detect sarcoidosis, where part of a spleen from a patient with known sarcoidosis is injected into the skin of a patient suspected to have the disease. If non caseating granulomas are found (four to six weeks later), the test is positive. If the patient has been on treatment (e.g., glucocorticoids), the test may return a false negative result. The test is not commonly performed, and in the UK no substrate has been available since 1996. There is a concern that certain infections, such as bovine spongiform encephalopathy, could be transferred through a Kveim test.

It is named for the Norwegian pathologist Morten Ansgar Kveim, who first reported the test in 1941 using lymph node tissue from sarcoidosis patients. It was popularised by the American physician Louis Siltzbach, who introduced a modified form using spleen tissue in 1954. Kveim's work was a refinement of earlier studies performed by Nickerson, who in 1935 first reported on skin reactions in sarcoid.

A Kveim test may be used to distinguish sarcoidosis from conditions with otherwise indistinguishable symptoms such as berylliosis.

== In popular culture ==
In the seventh episode of the second season of the medical drama series House M.D, Allison Cameron, Fellow of the hospital, performs the Kveim test on a patient believed to have sarcoidosis. The test is negative, and the patient is later found to have Echinococcosis, a parasitic tapeworm infection.
