= Josef Arneth =

German haematologist (1873–1955)

Josef Arneth (13 October 1873 in Burgkunstadt – 1955) was a German physician and haematologist known for naming the Arneth count.

He studied medicine at the Ludwig-Maximilians-Universität München, Heidelberg University, and the University of Würzburg, qualifying in 1897. He subsequently worked at the University of Würzburg, before becoming professor of medicine at the University of Münster in 1907, a position he held until 1944. He was an active researcher in haematology and published various books on the subject of pulmonary diseases and blood.
