= Louvel's sign =

- Differential diagnosis: deep vein thrombosis

Louvel's sign is a clinical sign found in patients with deep vein thrombosis. The sign is defined as pain in the distribution of the affected vein which occurs during coughing or sneezing (Valsalva maneuver), and which disappears when the vein is compressed proximally.
