= Rose's sign =

Clinical sign

- Differential diagnosis: deep vein thrombosis

Rose's sign is a clinical sign in which the skin of one leg feels warm and stiff when pinched. It can occur in people with deep vein thrombosis due to oedema in the affected leg.
