= Alfred Gordon =

French-born American neurologist

Alfred Gordon (1874, Paris – 1953) was a French-born American neurologist remembered for describing Gordon's sign. He studied medicine at the University of Paris, qualifying in 1895. He worked in Paris, Bern and Munich, and emigrated to the United States in 1899. He lived in Philadelphia and was an instructor of neuropathology at the Jefferson Medical College. His best-known work was On the Study of Reflexes.
