= Palla's sign =

Pattern seen in radiologic examinations

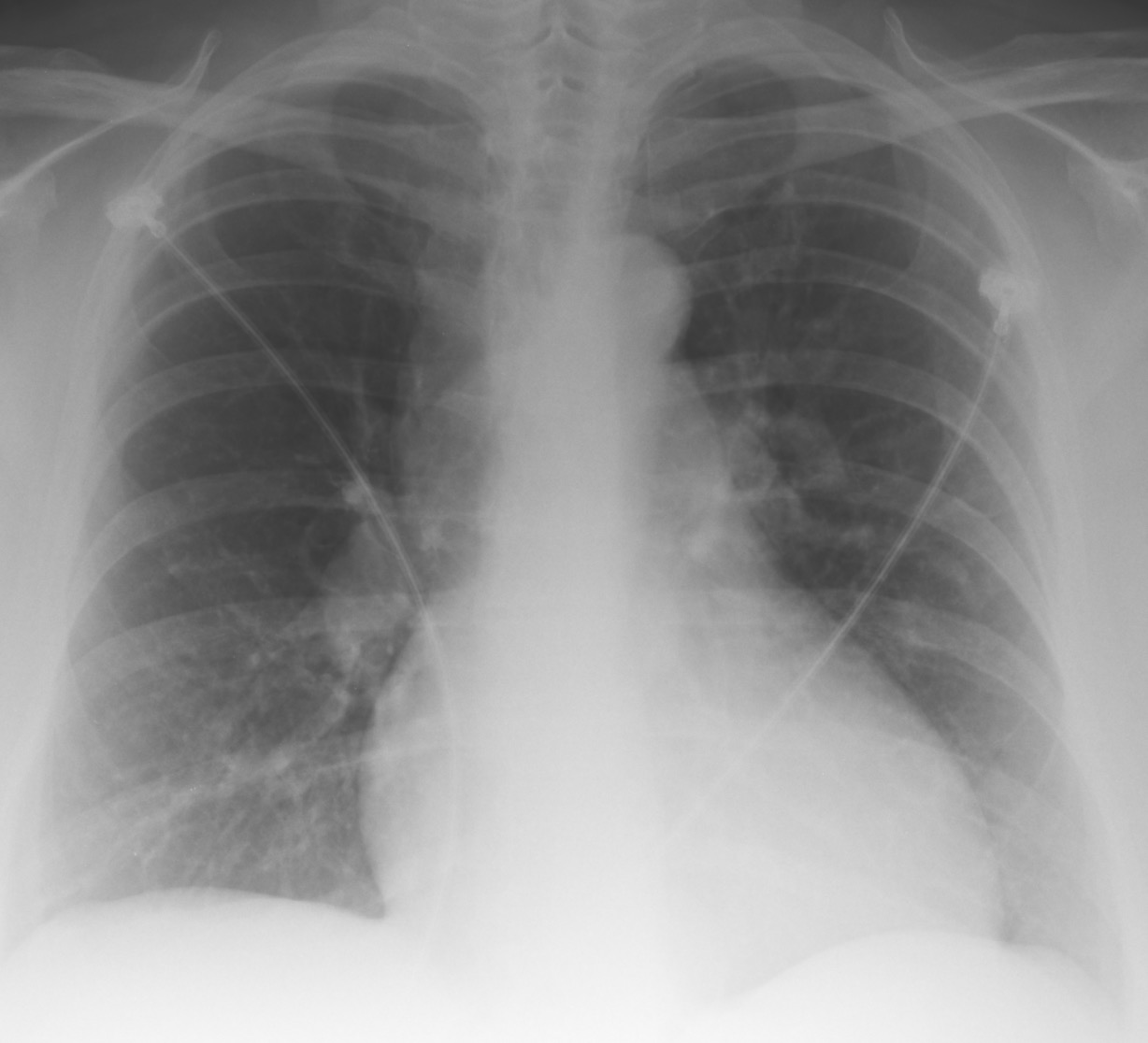
- Palla Sign and Westermark Sign
- Differential diagnosis: pulmonary embolism

Palla's sign is a clinical sign in which an enlarged right descending pulmonary artery is seen on the chest x-ray in patients with pulmonary embolism. It is of low sensitivity, and its specificity is not known. It exhibits as a "sausage" appearance on X-ray. It is named after italian radiologist Antonio Palla. In 1983, he published his observations that close to 25% of patients with pulmonary embolism had a chest x-ray sign of enlarged right descending pulmonary artery.
