= Kanavel's cardinal signs =

- Differential diagnosis: flexor tendon sheath infection

Kanavel's sign is a clinical sign found in patients with infection of a flexor tendon sheath in the hand (pyogenic flexor tenosynovitis), a serious condition which can cause rapid loss of function of the affected finger.

The sign consists of four components:

1. the affected finger is held in slight flexion.
2. there is fusiform swelling over the affected tendon.
3. there is tenderness over the affected flexor tendon sheath.
4. there is pain on passive extension of the affected finger.

The sign is named after Allen B. Kanavel who first described them in 1912.
