= Elschnig spots =

- Differential diagnosis: hypertensive retinopathy

Elschnig's spots are black spots surrounded by bright yellow or red halos seen on the retina during fundoscopy in patients with advanced hypertensive retinopathy. They are named after Anton Elschnig.

== Causes ==
Elschnig spots are commonly caused by acute hypertensive events of the choroidal vascular system, mostly in the young, because their system of vessels is not ready to handle the changes in blood pressure. These changes in blood pressure cause an infarct of the vessels leading to death of the RPE and photoreceptors they support creating this window defect.
