= Means–Lerman scratch =

Uncommon type of heart murmur

The Means–Lerman scratch is an uncommon type of heart murmur which occurs in patients with hyperthyroidism. It is a mid-systolic scratching sound best heard over the upper part of the sternum or second left intercostal space at the end of expiration. The murmur results from the rubbing of the pericardium against the pleura in the context of hyperdynamic circulation and tachycardia, and may mimic the sound of a pericardial rub.

The sign was described by J. Lerman M.D. and J. H. Means M.D. of Massachusetts General Hospital in 1932.
