= Waddell's triad =

Waddell's triad is a pattern of injury seen in pedestrian children who are struck by motor vehicles. The triad comprises:

- fractured femoral shaft
- intra-thoracic or intra-abdominal injuries
- contralateral head injury

The mechanism of injury is an initial impact causing injury to the femur on one side (bumper injury) and the torso on the same side (fender or hood), following which the child is thrown, striking the head on the ground or another object and sustaining injury to the opposite side of the head. In countries where cars drive on the right, pedestrians tend to be struck on the left, causing left femur fractures, injuries to the left chest or spleen, and right sided head injuries.

Although this injury pattern may not be common, it is used to emphasize the point that children involved in high energy impacts should not be assumed to have isolated injuries.
