= Pastia's lines =

- Differential diagnosis: scarlet fever

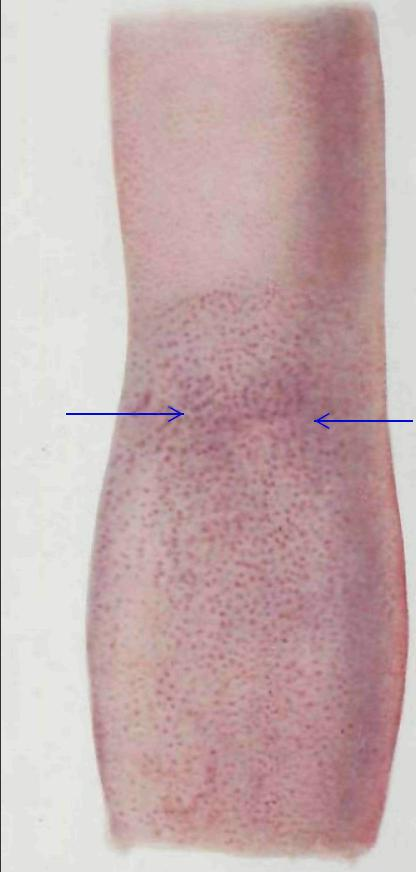

Pastia's sign, Pastia lines, or Thompson's sign is a clinical sign in which pink or red lines formed of confluent petechiae are found in skin creases, particularly the crease in the antecubital fossa, the soft depression on the inside of the arm; the folding crease divides this fossa where the forearm meets the (upper) arm (the biceps, triceps, humerus section of the upper extremity); the inside of the elbow (the inside flexor depression (fossa) of the elbow. It occurs in people with scarlet fever prior to the appearance of the rash and persists as pigmented lines after desquamation.

The sign is named after the Romanian physician Constantin Chessec Pastia (1883–1926).
