= Isaak Abelin =

Swiss physiologist

Isaak Abelin (6 February 1883, Bern – 1965) was a Swiss physiologist known for describing the Abelin reaction. He qualified in medicine at the University of Bern in 1910, and became professor of physiology in 1927. He worked in the fields of nutrition, metabolism and the thyroid gland.
