= Anton Elschnig =

Ophthalmologist

Anton Elschnig (22 August 1863 – 1939) was an ophthalmologist born in Leibnitz, Austria.

In 1886, he received his medical doctorate at the University of Graz, and later worked as an assistant at ophthalmology clinics in Graz and Vienna. In 1892 he obtained his habilitation at Graz, and from 1907 to 1933 was a full professor and head of the eye clinic at the University of Prague.

He is best known for performing corneal transplants in the early days of keratoplasty, being credited with developing a method introduced by Arthur von Hippel (1841-1916). Elschnig described this surgical procedure in the "Archives of Ophthalmology" (1930, 4: 165–173).

He was the publisher of the second and third editions of the Graefe-Saemisch Handbuch der gesammten Augenheilkunde.

== Eponymous ophthalmic terms ==
- "Elschnig's conjunctivitis": Conjunctivitis associated with hyperplasia of the tarsal gland.
- "Elschnig's pearls": Pearl-like clusters formed by growth of epithelial cells on the lens capsule in secondary cataract formation.
- "Elschnig's spots": phenomena of black flecks surrounded by yellow or red halos as seen by ophthalmoscope. It occurs in cases of advanced hypertensive retinopathy, represent focal choroidal infarcts.
