= Leonhard Koeppe =

German ophthalmologist (1884–1969)

Leonhard Koeppe (20 November 1884 – 18 March 1969) was a German ophthalmologist born in Torgau, in the Prussian Province of Saxony.

He studied medicine in Freiburg and Halle, earning his doctorate in 1911. In 1914 he became an assistant at the ophthalmology clinic in Halle, and in 1918 received his habilitation. In 1921 he became an associate professor at the University of Halle.

From 1923 to 1925 he was a research associate for Bausch and Lomb in Rochester, New York, returning to Halle in 1926 to perform optical research. In 1930-31 he was a research professor of ophtalmo-microscopy at University of Iowa, and afterwards returned to the University of Halle as an instructor.

Koeppe was a specialist involving the anatomy of the eye and its internal structure. He is credited with providing a description of small white nodules at the pupillary margins found in granulomatous uveitis. These structures are now referred to as "Koeppe nodules". His name is also associated with the "Koeppe lens", which is a type of goniolens specifically designed for office and operating room examinations, and is often used in laser therapy.

Koeppe is also known for popularizing and making improvements to the slit lamp, an ophthalmic device that had been recently devised by Allvar Gullstrand (1862-1930). In addition, he travelled throughout Europe and North America giving lectures and demonstrating the usage of the slit lamp.

In 1921 he was awarded with an honorary professorship from the University of Madrid.

== Selected writings ==
- Die Diathermie und Lichtbehandlung des Auges. (Diathermy and Light Treatment for the Eye).
- Die Mikroskopie des lebenden Auges in zwei Bänden (Microscopy of the Living Eye, two volumes).

== Literature ==
- Hans-Joachim Böttcher: "Köppe, Wilhelm Hermann Leonhard", in: Bedeutende historische Persönlichkeiten der Dübener Heide, AMF - Nr. 237, 2012, S. 53-54.
