= August Siegrist =

Swiss ophthalmologist (1865–1947)

August Siegrist (20 May 1865, in Basel – 13 December 1947) was a Swiss ophthalmologist remembered for describing Siegrist streaks. He trained at Basel, Zurich, Lausanne, Vienna and Bern, where he received his M.D. in 1892. He studied further in Bern under Emil Theodor Kocher and in Vienna under Ernst Fuchs. He was habilitated in ophthalmology at Basel in 1900, and in 1903 succeeded Ernst Pflüger as professor of ophthalmology and director of the eye clinic at the University of Bern. He maintained these positions at Bern up until 1935. He worked on the correction of keratoconus including the use of early contact lenses.
