= David Henry Goodsall =

English surgeon

David Henry Goodsall (4 January 1843, in Gravesend – 14 September 1906, in London) was an English surgeon who is remembered for describing Goodsall's rule.

He was born in Gravesend, and educated at St. Ann's School. His father had decided to study medicine, but died while he was a student at St. Bartholomew's Hospital, as a result of a wound sustained while performing a post mortem examination. As a result, David Goodsall's fees at St. Bartholomews were waived, as his father's wound was inflicted by a member of staff, and he studied medicine there from 1865. He became house surgeon at St Mark's Hospital in 1870, a Fellow of the Royal College of Surgeons in 1872, and full surgeon in 1888. He developed an interest in rectal surgery, writing a chapter in Diseases of the Anus and Rectum in which Goodsall's rule is described. He is thought to have died of a myocardial infarction in 1906.
