= Jenő Jendrassik =

Hungarian painter

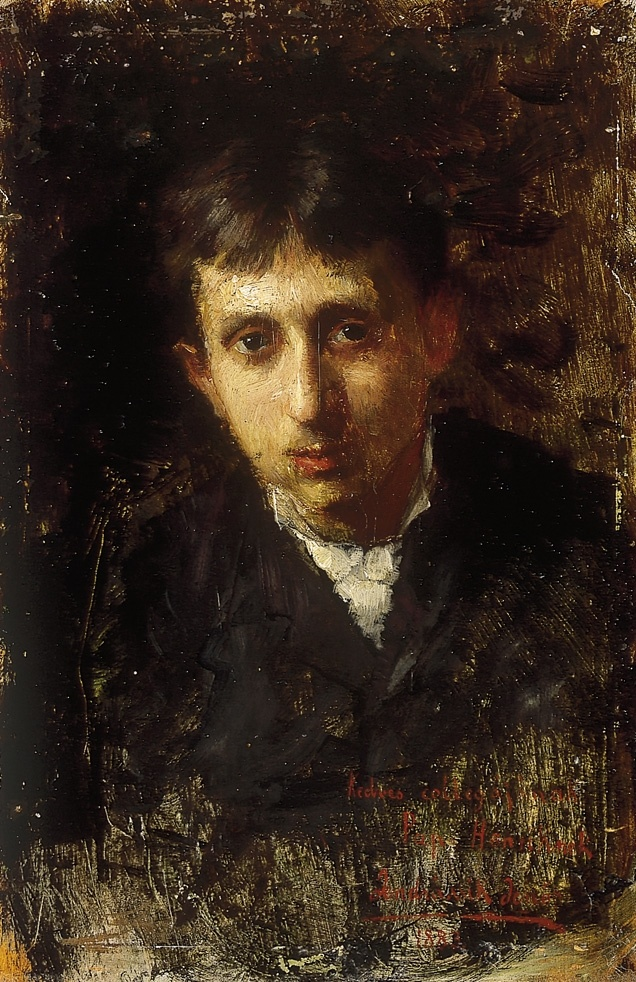
- Self portrait
- Born: Jenő Jendrassik; 1860; Budapest
- Died: 1919 (aged 58–59); Kökényesd

Jenő Jendrassik (Budapest, 1860 – Kökényesd, 1919) was a Hungarian painter whose work is exhibited in the Hungarian National Gallery.

At first, he studied law, then completed his art studies in Munich and Paris. There, he studied for four years at the Bavarian royal academy under teachers Hackl, Benczúr and Löffler. He spent a year in Paris under the leadership of A. Morot. He created life pictures with a sentimental tone and theme. In 1884, he exhibited his paintings «After Trial» and «Thoughts» for the first time in the gallery of the national fine arts company in Budapest. He won the Ráth prize at the Műcsarnok exhibition in 1892 with his painting "Widow", and the Károlyi prize at the 1895 exhibition with his painting "The End". His painting of the same can be found in the gallery of the national museum. Later, he painted portraits of the children of noble families.
