= Bing's sign =

- Differential diagnosis: Upper motor neuron lesion

Bing's sign or Bing's reflex is a clinical sign in which pricking the dorsum of the foot or toe with a pin causes extension of the great toe. It is seen in patients with upper motor neuron lesion of the lower limbs. It is one of a number of Babinski-like responses.

This sign is named after Paul Robert Bing.
