= Koeppe's nodules =

Medical sign in eyes

Koeppe's nodules are small nodules seen at the inner margin of the iris in patients with granulomatous anterior uveitis, which occurs in conditions such as sarcoidosis and tuberculosis. The nodules are composed of epithelioid cells and giant cells surrounded by lymphocytes.

Koeppe's nodules are named after Leonhard Koeppe.
