= Bitot's spots =

- Other names: ICD10 = E50.1
- Bitot's spot
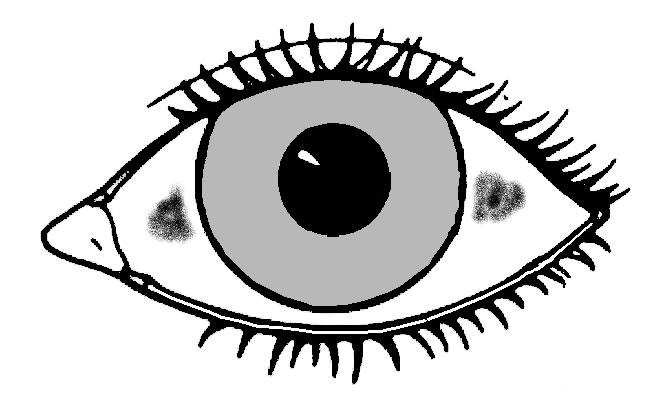
- Typical location of Bitot's spots
- Specialty: Ophthalmology

Bitot's spots are the buildup of keratin located superficially in the conjunctiva of human's eyes. They can be oval, triangular or irregular in shape. The spots are a sign of vitamin A deficiency and associated with drying of the cornea. In 1863, the French physician Pierre Bitot (1822–1888) first described these spots. The spots may abate under replacement therapy. In ancient Egypt, this was treated with animal liver, which is where vitamin A is stored.

== Causes ==
A major cause of Bitot's spots is vitamin A deficiency (VAD). Rarely, pellagra due to deficiency of vitamin B_{3} (niacin) may also cause Bitot's spots. They can also be caused by Colestyramine, which is a bile acid sequestrant which can reduce the absorption of fat soluble vitamins (Vitamins A, D, E, K)

== Treatment ==
VAD is commonly treated with oral vitamin A supplements. Improvement of Bitot's spots is seen with high-dose vitamin A therapy. Bitot's spots non-responsive to vitamin A therapy may be removed surgically.
