= Gallavardin phenomenon =

- Differential diagnosis: aortic stenosis

The Gallavardin phenomenon is a clinical sign found in patients with aortic stenosis. It is described as the dissociation between the noisy and musical components of the systolic murmur heard in aortic stenosis. The harsh noisy component is best heard at the upper right sternal border radiating to the neck due to the high velocity jet in the ascending aorta. The musical high frequency component is best heard at the cardiac apex. The presence of a murmur at the apex can be misinterpreted as mitral regurgitation. However, the apical murmur of the Gallavardin phenomenon does not radiate to the left axilla and is accentuated by a slowing of the heart rate (such as a compensatory pause after a premature beat) whereas the mitral regurgitation murmur does not change.

The sign is named after Louis Gallavardin, having been described by Gallavardin and Ravault in 1925.
