= Hildreth's sign =

- Differential diagnosis: glomus tumors and hemangiopericytomas

Hildreth's sign is a physical examination technique useful in differentiating glomus tumors and hemangiopericytomas from other masses with a similar appearance. It was first described by DH Hildreth in 1970.

== Technique ==
After assessing the mass for pain or tenderness, the patient is asked to elevate the affected limb and slowly inflate the cuff of a sphygmomanometer around it, while the examiner massages the limb to exsanguinate it. Hildreth's sign is positive if the patient notes relief of the pain or tenderness while the cuff is inflated, and experiences sudden onset of pain in the mass when the pressure in the cuff is released.

== Value in diagnosis ==
One study reports the test has a sensitivity of 92%, a specificity of 91%, a positive predictive value of 92% and a negative predictive value of 91% in diagnosing glomus tumors.
