= Pierre Bitôt =

French physician (1822–1888)

Pierre Alain Bitôt
- Born: 22 March 1822; Podensac
- Died: 2 February 1888 (aged 65)
- Known for: Bitot's spots

Pierre Alain Bitôt (22 March 1822, in Podensac – 2 February 1888) was a French medical doctor, anatomist and surgeon; remembered for describing Bitot's spots.

== Biography ==
He attended medical school in Bordeaux, qualifying in 1846. He gained his M.D. in 1848 from the faculty of Paris, and joined the anatomy department in Bordeaux. He became Professor of anatomy in 1854, and gained his Chirurgien des Hôpitaux in 1878.

== Honors ==
Bitot's spots, the triangular spots that seen in the conjunctiva of the eye are named after him. He first described the spots in 1863.
