= McMurray test =

Physical examination of the knee

The McMurray test, also known as the McMurray circumduction test, is used to evaluate individuals for tears in the meniscus of the knee. A tear in the meniscus may cause a pedunculated tag of the meniscus which may become jammed between the joint surfaces.

To perform the test, the knee is held by one hand, which is placed along the joint line, and flexed to complete flexion while the foot is held by the sole (of the foot) with the other hand. The examiner then rotates the leg internally while extending the knee to 90 degrees of flexion. If a "thud" or "click" is felt along with pain, this constitutes a "positive McMurray test" for a tear in the posterior portion of the lateral meniscus. Likewise, external rotation of the leg can be applied to test the posterior portion of the medial meniscus.

The McMurray test is named after Thomas Porter McMurray, a British orthopedic surgeon from the late nineteenth and early twentieth century who was the first to describe this test. The description of the test has since been altered from the original by various authors. Most commonly, varus and valgus stress to the knee is added. These variations constitute different tests with different statistical performance and should not be confused with the original.

According to some sources, the sensitivity of the McMurray test for medial meniscus tears is 53% and the specificity is 59%. In a recent study, clinical test results were compared with arthroscopic and/or arthrotomy findings as reference. The clinical test had a sensitivity of 58.5%, a specificity of 93.4%, and the predictive value of a positive result was 82.6%. A more recent study showed a 97% specificity for meniscal tears.

== See also ==
- Knee examination
