= Bodansky unit =

Obsolete blood test for alkaline phosphatase

The Bodansky unit is an obsolete measure of alkaline phosphatase concentration in blood. It is defined as the quantity of alkaline phosphatase that liberates 1 mg of phosphate ion during the first hour of incubation with a buffered substrate containing sodium β-glycerophosphate. This technique was the first test to measure blood alkaline phosphatase levels, and was developed by Aaron Bodansky in the early 1930s.

Other units that were used in the past as a measure of blood alkaline phosphatase levels are King-Armstrong units, Kind-King units, and International units. However, the Bodansky unit and those other units have become outdated, and the current standard for measuring alkaline phosphatase is units per liter (U/L).
