= Budin's sign =

Clinical sign to detect the presence of pus in breast milk

Budin's sign (or Signe de Budin) is a clinical sign to detect the presence of pus in breast milk. It was first described in 19th century by the French obstetrician Pierre-Constant Budin.

== Procedure ==
This test can be easily done in clinical practice. The flow or milk from the inflamed nipple is placed on a sterile pad. Budin's sign is positive if the milk is mixed with pus (brown, yellow or bloody traces). It is performed in cases of suspected mastitis and to differentiate between lymphangitis of the breast and infectious (often bacterial) mastitis. The sign is absent in case of lymphangitis and present in case of infectious mastitis. The procedure can be painful, especially if infection is present. A false positive test may be obtained if fat globules are mistaken for pus.
