= Allen B. Kanavel =

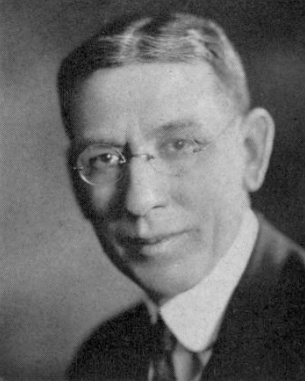
- Born: Allen Buckner Kanavel; September 2, 1874; Sedgwick, Kansas
- Died: May 27, 1938 (aged 63); Kern County, California
- Education: Northwestern University School of Medicine
- Occupation: Surgeon
- Spouse: Olive Rosencranz (m. 1908)

Allen Buckner Kanavel (1874–1938) was an American surgeon remembered for describing Kanavel's sign.

== Biography ==
Allen B. Kanavel was born in Sedgwick, Kansas on September 2, 1874. He graduated from the Northwestern University School of Medicine in 1899. He spent six months in Vienna, then spent his career at Cook County Hospital and the department of surgery at Northwestern University School of Medicine.

He married Olive Rosencranz on October 8, 1908.

He became professor of surgery at Northwestern in 1919, and was associate editor and later editor of the Journal of Surgery, Gynaecology and Obstetrics. In 1920 he established the Department of Neurological Surgery at Northwestern University and was named Chairman of the department. He worked with the United States Army during the First World War, both in the Surgeon General's office in Washington, D.C. and in France in 1918 as assistant to the Chief Consultant in surgery of the American Expeditionary Force. His interest was infections of the hand, and his 1912 monograph on the subject was considered a milestone in hand surgery.

Dr. Kanavel died on May 27, 1938 in a car accident in Kern County, California, eight miles north of Mojave. His adopted sons Richard and David were also in the car, but escaped relatively unharmed. They were on their way to go fishing.
