= Kelly's sign =

Clinical sign

Kelly's sign is a clinical sign in which the ureter can be distinguished during surgery due to visible vermiculation which occurs when the ureter is pressed gently.

The sign is named after Howard Atwood Kelly.
