= Paul Robert Bing =

Swiss neurologist

Paul Robert Bing (5 May 1878 in Strasbourg – 15 March 1956 in Basel) was a Swiss neurologist remembered for Bing's sign.

== Biography ==
Robert Bing was born in Strasbourg, now France in 1878. He studied medicine at the University of Basel until 1902, and also trained in Frankfurt am Main, Paris, London and Berlin. He worked as a neurologist in Basel, becoming Lecturer at the University of Basel in 1907, and Professor of neurology in 1932. He wrote a neurology textbook and published many papers; his main area of research was on the spinocerebellar tract. He also published work on cluster headache.
