= Frank's sign =

Diagonal crease in the earlobe

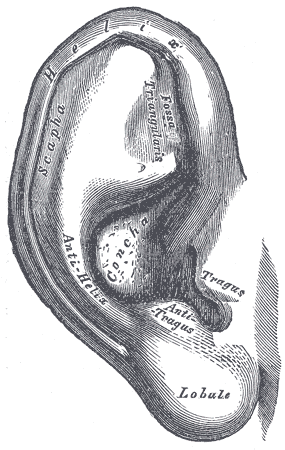
Normal ear anatomy

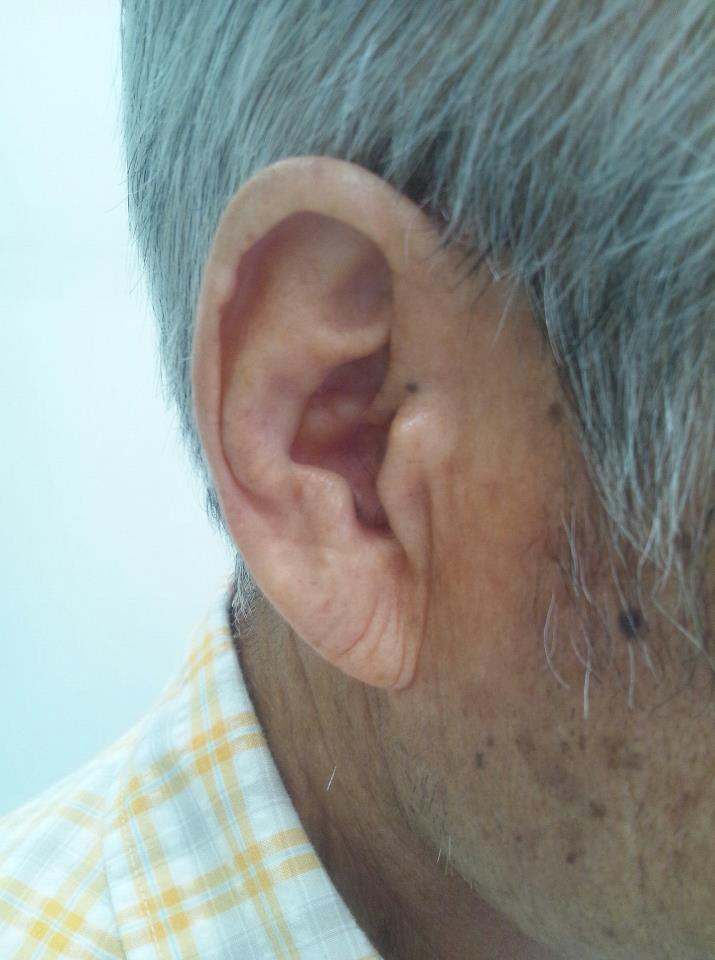
Earlobe creases seen in a Japanese angina patient

Frank's sign is a diagonal crease in the earlobe extending from the tragus across the lobule to the rear edge of the auricle. The sign is named after Sanders T. Frank.

It has been hypothesized that Frank's sign is indicative of cardiovascular disease and/or diabetes. Some studies have described Frank's sign as a marker of cardiovascular disease as a nontraditional risk factor but not linked to the severity of the condition. In contrast, other studies have rebutted any association between Frank's sign and coronary artery disease in diabetics. There have also been reported cases of Frank's sign being a predictor of cerebral infarctions. A link between Frank's sign and premature aging and the loss of dermal and vascular fibers has also been hypothesized. Some studies have focused on association between bilateral earlobe crease and coronary artery disease. It is probably prudent to consider Frank's Sign alongside other clinical markers of physiological ageing, rather than utilizing it as a stand-alone sign in the identification of coronary artery disease.

== Severity ==
- Grade 3 – A deep crease across the whole of the earlobe.
- Grade 2b – Creased more than halfway across the earlobe.
- Grade 2a – A superficial crease across the earlobe.
- Grade 1 – A small amount of wrinkling on the earlobe.

== Notable individuals with Frank's sign ==
- Dick Van Dyke
- George W. Bush
- Mel Gibson
- Steven Spielberg
- Donald Trump
