= Arneth count =

Blood test

The Arneth count or Arneth index describes the nucleus of a type of white blood cell called a neutrophil in an attempt to detect disease.

Neutrophils typically have two or three lobes. In general, older neutrophils have more lobes than younger neutrophils. The Arneth count determines the percentage of neutrophils with one, two, three, four, and five or more lobes.

- Individuals who have a larger percentage of neutrophils with fewer lobes have a left shift which can be indicative of disease processes such as infection, malignant tumors, hemolytic crises, myocardial infarction, acidosis, etc.
- Individuals with a larger percentage of neutrophils with more lobes have a right shift and most commonly have diseases such as vitamin B_{12} or folate deficiency, chronic uremia, liver disease, etc.

The Arneth count is not commonly used in modern medicine.

It is named for Josef Arneth.
