= Salus's sign =

- Differential diagnosis: hypertensive retinopathy

Salus's sign is a clinical sign in which deflection of retinal venules can be seen on fundoscopy occurring in patients with hypertensive retinopathy. Arteriosclerosis causes shortening or lengthening of arterioles, which causes venules to be moved at points where arterioles and venules cross over. This is seen at right-angle crossing points, where the venule crosses the arteriole in a horseshoe shape.

The sign is named after Robert Salus.
