= Transverse ligament =

A transverse ligament is a ligament on a transverse plane, orthogonal to the anteroposterior or oral-aboral axiscan of the body.

In human anatomy, examples are:

- Flexor retinaculum of the hand or transverse carpal ligament (ligamentum carpi transversum)
- Inferior transverse ligament of scapula (ligamentum transversum scapulae inferius)
- Inferior transverse ligament of the tibiofibular syndesmosis
- Superior transverse ligament of the scapula (ligamentum transversum scapulae superius)
- Superior extensor retinaculum of foot or transverse crural ligament (ligamentum transversum cruris)
- Transverse acetabular ligament (ligamentum transversum acetabuli)
- Transverse humeral ligament (ligamentum transversum humeri)
- Transverse ligament of the atlas (ligamentum transversum atlantis)
- Transverse ligament of knee (ligamentum transversum genus)
