= Sanders T. Frank =

American pulmonologist

Sanders T. Frank (May 11, 1938 – September 14, 1997) was an American pulmonologist known for describing the Frank sign. He was born in Middletown, Connecticut and qualified from New York Medical College. He worked as director of respiratory medicine and associate clinical professor of medicine at the Garfield Medical Center, Monterey Park, California.
