= Carvallo's sign =

- Differential diagnosis: Tricuspid regurgitation

Carvallo's sign is a clinical sign found in patients with tricuspid regurgitation. The pansystolic murmur found in this condition becomes louder during inspiration; this sign enables it to be distinguished from mitral regurgitation.

== Eponym ==
The sign is named after José Manuel Rivero Carvallo.
