= Rosenbach's test =

- Purpose: detect bile in urine

Rosenbach's test is a qualitative medical test to detect the presence of bile in urine. To carry out the test, the urine is passed through the same filter paper several times. The filter paper is then dried, and a drop of nitric acid is added. In the presence of bile, the characteristic bile pigment colours appear (a yellow spot with rings of red, violet, blue and green around it).

The test is named after Ottomar Rosenbach.
