= José Manuel Rivero Carvallo =

Mexican cardiologist (1905–1993)

José Manuel Rivero Carvallo (1 April 1905, Tehuacán – 15 February 1993) was a Mexican cardiologist remembered for describing Carvallo's sign.

== Biography ==
José Carvallo was born in Tehuacán, in the Mexican state of Puebla, in 1905. He studied initially at the Meritorious Autonomous University of Puebla, then continued his studies in Paris with a scholarship granted by the French government, gaining his doctorate in 1932. He returned to Mexico in 1934 to practice cardiology. In 1944, he was a founding member of the National Institute of Cardiology of Mexico under Ignacio Chávez Sánchez. He described the sign for which he is remembered in 1946.
