= Magnan's sign =

- Differential diagnosis: Paraesthesia (due to cocaine addiction)

Magnan's sign is a clinical sign in which people with cocaine addiction experience paraesthesia which feels like a constantly moving foreign body, such as fine sand or powder, under the skin.

The sign is named after Valentin Magnan.
