= Fox's sign =

- Differential diagnosis: acute pancreatitis

Fox's sign is a clinical sign in which bruising is seen over the inguinal ligament. It occurs in patients with retroperitoneal bleeding, usually due to acute haemorrhagic pancreatitis.

Named after London surgeon John Adrian Fox after he reported 2 fatal cases of non-traumatic ecchymosis in the upper outer aspect of the thigh as a diagnostic sign of retroperitoneal haemorrhage.

Often incorrectly eponymously attributed to the American dermatologist George Henry Fox (1846–1937) despite JA Fox's paper being published in 1966.
