= Louis Gallavardin =

French cardiologist

Louis Gallavardin (1875, Lyon – 2 December 1957, Lyon) was a French physician and cardiologist remembered for the Gallavardin phenomenon.

== Biography ==
Louis Gallavardin studied medicine at the Lyon medical school, becoming interne in 1895 and Médecin des Hôpitaux de Lyon in 1902. He published 360 papers on cardiovascular medicine from 1898 to 1945, covering the whole subject apart from congenital malformations. Until 1910 his papers were concerned with general medicine, and after 1910 he focused on cardiology.

His book La Tension artérielle en Clinique, published in 1910, was the standard text on the measurement of blood pressure. He realised the importance of electrocardiography, and published on arrhythmias, particularly ventricular tachycardia. He described a type of aortic stenosis which was not rheumatic in origin, and described effort syncope in the condition. He studied angina pectoris, describing the syndrome in Les Angines de Poitrine in 1925; he maintained the belief that coronary artery disease was the cause.

He founded an independent school of cardiology in Lyon at a time when Louis Henri Vaquez dominated cardiology in France.
