= Gordon's sign =

- Differential diagnosis: Pyramidal tract lesions

Gordon's sign is a clinical sign in which squeezing the calf muscle elicits an extensor plantar reflex. It is found in patients with pyramidal tract lesions, and is one of a number of Babinski-like responses.

The sign is named after Alfred Gordon.
