= Auberger's blood group =

Type of human blood group

Auberger's blood group is a type of human blood group in which the Aua antigen is expressed. It is found in 82% of caucasians. It may be related to the Lutheran antigen system.

The blood group was named after patient Auberger, who was a 59-year-old French woman with oesophageal varices.
