= Joffroy's sign =

- Differential diagnosis: Graves disease

Joffroy's sign is a clinical sign in which there is a lack of wrinkling of the forehead when a patient looks up with the head bent forwards. It occurs in patients with exophthalmos in Graves disease.

The sign is named after Alix Joffroy.
