= William Ewart (physician) =

English physician (1848–1929)

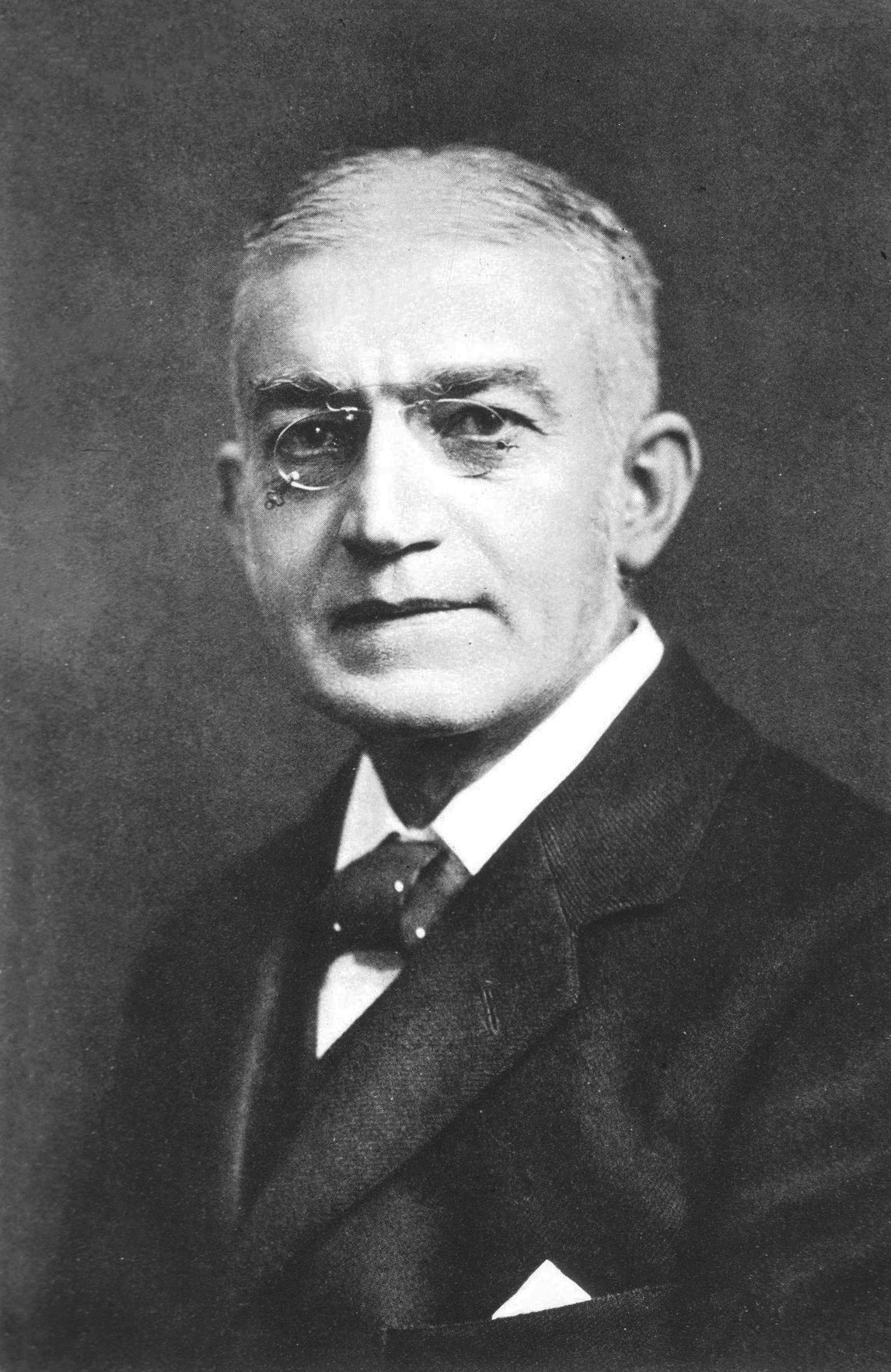
William Ewart

William Ewart (26 December 1848, London – 11 August 1929, London) was an English physician remembered for Ewart's sign.

== Biography ==
William Ewart was born in London to a French mother, and was educated partly in England and partly at the University of Paris. He studied medicine at St George's Hospital Medical School, his studies were interrupted by military service with the French Army in the War of 1870.

After his military service Ewart qualified as a LRCS in 1871 and LRCP in 1872. He gained his M.B. in 1877 from Cambridge University. He worked at St George's Hospital and the Royal Brompton Hospital, becoming a Fellow of the Royal College of Physicians in 1881 and Doctor of Medicine in 1882. He retired in 1907.

Ewart authored Gout and Goutiness and Their Treatment, in 1897. The book was described by a reviewer in The British Medical Journal as a magnum opus on gout.

== Selected publications ==
- Gout and Goutiness and Their Treatment (1898)
- Marine Climates in the Treatment of Tuberculosis: The Opening Address Delivered at the Hastings Meeting of the British Balneological and Climatological Society (1907)
