= James Sherren =

British surgeon (1872–1945)

James Sherren (31 October 1872 – 29 October 1945) was a British surgeon. Two medical terms related to appendicitis — a diagnostic sign and a conservative treatment regimen — bear his name.

== Biography ==
Sherren was born in 1872 in Weymouth, Dorset. His father was a printer and publisher. Sherren attended Weymouth College. He went to sea and became a Master Mariner before continuing his education at London Hospital Medical College. He trained and worked as a surgeon at The London Hospital. In 1901, Sherren agreed to surgically divide two nerves in the arm of colleague Henry Head so that they could study the evolution of Head's recovery. Sherren and Head published three books together, one of them also co-authored by W. H. R. Rivers.

Sherren served with the War Office during World War I and rose to the rank of colonel. He was appointed a CBE designation in 1919. In London, his notable patients included author Florence Dugdale, the wife of Thomas Hardy. Sherren operated on Dugdale for a mass in her neck. In the mid-1920s, Sherren quit his hospital practice to become a ship's surgeon. He died in 1945 at Broadstone, Dorset after an extended illness. His survivors included his widow, three sons, and two daughters.

== Legacy ==
A diagnostic sign in appendicitis (known as Sherren's triangle) is named for him. Sherren's triangle represents the area bounded by the anterior superior iliac spine, the pubic symphysis and the navel. Hyperesthesia (increased sensitivity to touch) in this area is a potential sign of appendicitis. Ochsner-Sherren treatment, which is the conservative (non-surgical) management of appendicitis, is also named after him.
