= Aaron Bodansky =

Russian-born American biochemist (1887–1960)

- Born: 1887; Yelizavetgrad, Russian Empire
- Died: 1960 (aged 72–73); Jerusalem, Israel
- Education: Cornell University (Ph.D. 1921)
- Scientific career
- Fields: Biochemistry, including thyroxin and insulin metabolism
- Workplaces: Hospital for Joint Diseases, New York
- Thesis: Enzyme studies on Solanum elaeagnifolium (1921)

Aaron Bodansky (1887–1960) was a Russian-born American biochemist remembered for describing the Bodansky unit in the measurement of alkaline phosphatase in blood.

== Biography ==
Aaron Bodansky was born in Yelizavetgrad, Russia (now Kropyvnytskyi, Ukraine) in 1887 and emigrated to the United States in 1904, followed in the next two years by his parents and siblings. He studied biochemistry at Cornell University, earning a Ph.D. in 1921 with a thesis titled "Enzyme studies on solanum elaeagnifolium". In 1926, Bodansky was hired into the laboratory division of the Hospital for Joint Diseases (now part of NYU Langone Medical Center). At the Hospital for Joint Diseases, Bodansky's work covered a variety of areas of biochemistry including thyroxin and insulin metabolism, metabolism of minerals and bones, liver function, and parathyroid function. His area of special interest was calcium metabolism. He published several papers in this field, including the work on measurement of phosphatase activity. He died in 1960 from a heart attack. Two brothers, Meyer Bodansky (1896–1941) and Oscar Bodansky (1901–1977) were themselves prominent biochemists, often leading to confusion in the attribution of their individual accomplishments.
