= Jules Comby =

French pediatrician (1853–1947)

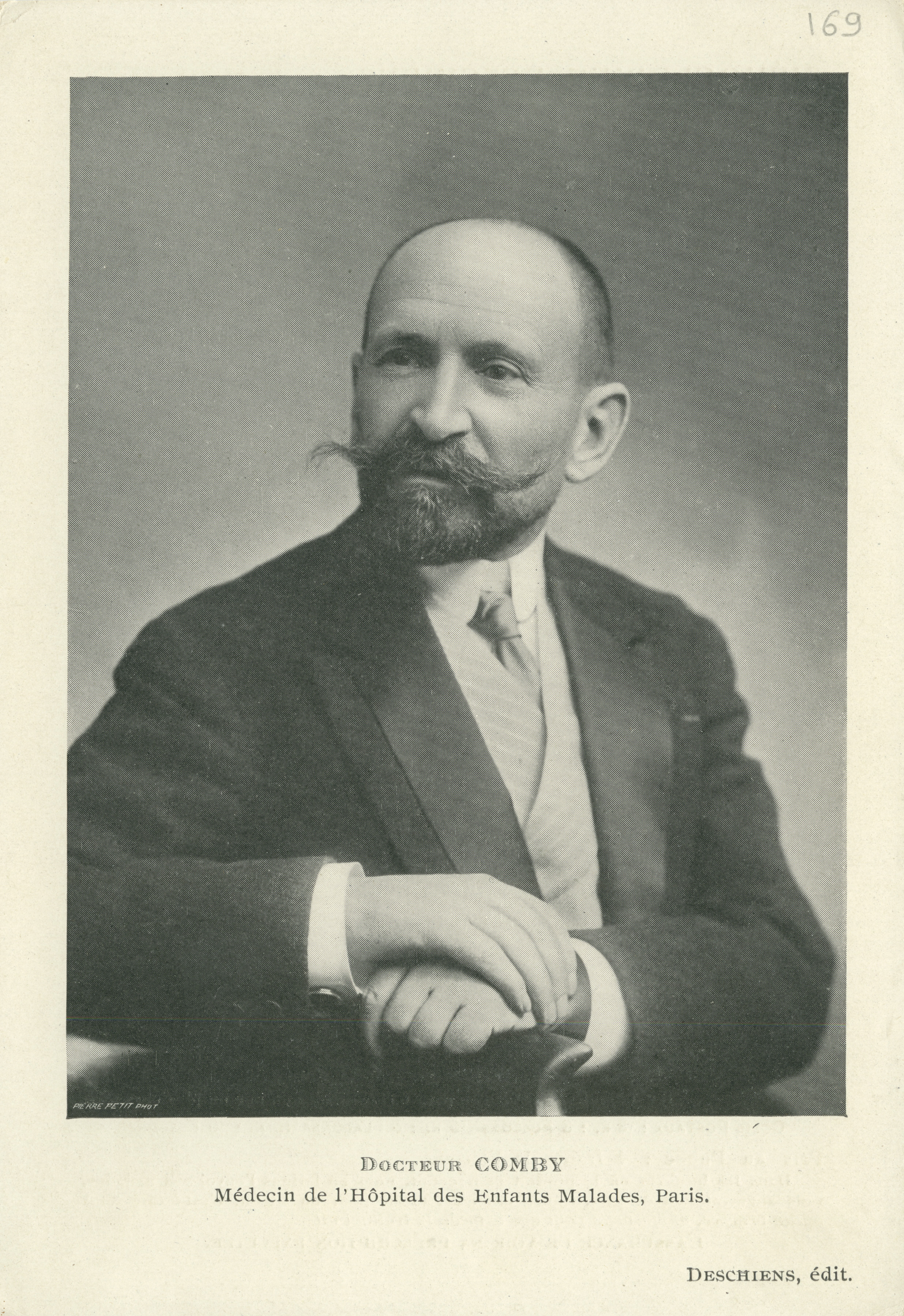
Jules Comby

Jules Comby (French pronunciation: [ʒyl kɔ̃bi]; 28 April 1853, in Arnac-Pompadour – 18 March 1947) was a French pediatrician.

The eponymous "Comby's sign" is named after him, which is an early indication of measles characterized by thin whitish patches on the gums and buccal mucous membrane.

== Written works ==
With Antoine Marfan (1858–1942) and Jacques-Joseph Grancher (1843–1907), he published the influential Traité des maladies de l’enfance (Treatise of the Diseases of Childhood). Other publications and translated works of his include:

- Étiologie et prophylaxie du rachitisme, 1885 - Etiology and prevention of rachitis.
- Étiologie et prophylaxie de la scrofule dans la première enfance, 1885 - Etiology and prevention of scrofula in infancy.
- Le rachitisme, 1892, in Spanish as El raquitismo 1895 - Rachitis.
- Les oreillons, 1893 - The mumps.
- Formulaire thérapeutique et prophylaxie des maladies des enfants, 1894 - Therapeutic formulary and prevention involving diseases of children.
- L'empyème pulsatile 1895 - Pulsatile empyema.
- Paralysies obstétricales des nouveau-nés, 1897 - Obstetrical paralyses of the new-born.
- "Diseases of children", London : Sampson Low, Marston, 1897
- "Diseases of children: excluding infectious diseases and rachitis"; New York: 1897
- Tratado de las enfermedades de la Infancia, two editions published between 1899 and 1910 in Spanish.
- Tratado de terapeutica clinica y profilaxia de las enfermedades de los ninos, published in Spanish (1905).
- Cent cinquante consultations médicales pour les maladies des enfants, 1910 - 150 medical consultations involving illnesses of children.
- Deux cents consultations médicales pour les maladies des enfants, 1915 - 200 medical consultations involving illnesses of children.
