= Thomas Porter McMurray =

British orthopaedic surgeon

Thomas Porter McMurray CBE (5 December 1887, Belfast – 16 November 1949, London) was a British orthopaedic surgeon remembered for describing the McMurray test.

== Biography ==
Thomas McMurray graduated from Queen's University, Belfast in 1910, and took up a house job in Liverpool under Sir Robert Jones. He served as a captain in the Royal Army Medical Corps in France for a short time, returning to the Alder Hey Military Hospital in Liverpool in 1914. He continued his training under Robert Jones, becoming lecturer at the Department of Orthopaedic Surgery at the University of Liverpool from 1924 to 1938, and succeeding Robert Jones as director of orthopaedics. He became the first professor of orthopaedic surgery in Liverpool in 1938.

He was president of the British Orthopaedic Society and the Liverpool Medical Institution, and president-elect of the British Medical Association.

His dexterity as a surgeon was noted; he was able to remove a meniscus in five minutes, and disarticulate a hip in little over ten. As a teacher, he upheld the principles of Hugh Owen Thomas, and built up a postgraduate school of orthopaedic surgery at the University of Liverpool.

He died of a heart attack at a railway station in London while travelling to visit his son in South Africa.
