= Robert Salus =

Austrian ophthalmologist

Robert Salus (18 September 1877 in Plzeň - 1961 in Milan) was an Austrian-Czechs ophthalmologist known for describing Salus's sign. He studied at the German University in Prague, gaining his M.D. in 1902. He was habilitated in ophthalmology in 1909 and became professor of ophthalmology in Prague in 1916. He described rubeosis iridis in 1928, and vascular changes in hypertension in 1939. He was deported to Theresienstadt on July 8, 1943, and survived.
