= Frank W. Crowe =

American physician

Frank Wilkinson Crowe (July 2, 1919 – April 29, 1987) was an American physician, who practiced Dermatology in Boise, Idaho. He was a world-renowned authority for the Crowe sign or Crowe's sign in neurofibromatosis which is the presence of axillary (armpit) freckling in people with neurofibromatosis type I (von Recklinghausen's disease). These freckles occur in up to 30% of people with the disease and their presence is one of seven diagnostic criteria for neurofibromatosis. Freckles can also be present in the intertriginous area in neurofibromatosis, such as the inguinal fold, submamillary areas and nape of the neck.

In 1956 Crowe et al. recognised the autosomal dominant heredity of neurofibromatosis and the use of 6 or more café au lait spots to diagnose the condition. In 1964 Crowe published work on the use of axillary freckling in its diagnosis, which is now referred to as the Crowe sign.
