= Sherren's triangle =

- Differential diagnosis: acute appendicitis

Sherren's triangle is an area of skin hyperaesthesia found in acute appendicitis. It was described by the English surgeon James Sherren. It is bounded by lines joining anterior superior iliac spine, the pubic tubercle and umbilicus.

it is regarded as a good guide in the diagnosis of gangrenous appendicitis

If this hyperasthesia disappear during the course of illness it indicates bursting of the gangrenous appendix.
