= Ernő Jendrassik =

Hungarian physician

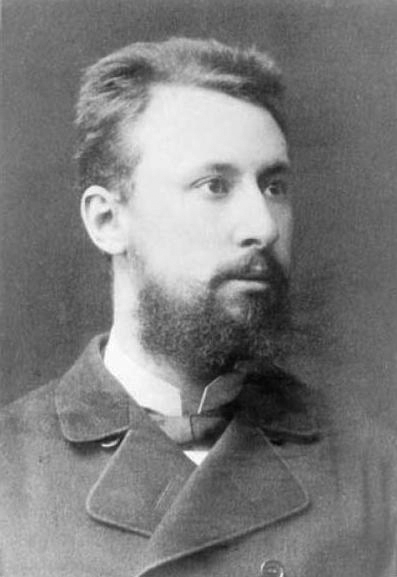
Jendrassik Ernő

Jendrassik Ernő (7 June 1858 – 21 December 1921) was a Hungarian physician best known for his research on reflexes, in particular, the Jendrassik maneuver.

He was born in Kolozsvár, Transylvania, Austrian Empire, to Jendrassik Jenő, who was a famous physician and professor of physiology. Jendrassik graduated from the University of Budapest in medicine in 1880. His first paper, Beiträge zur Lehre von den Sehnenreflexen, was published in 1883 and earned him local and international recognition. It was also the beginning of his research on reflexes.
