= Alix Joffroy =

French neurologist and psychiatrist

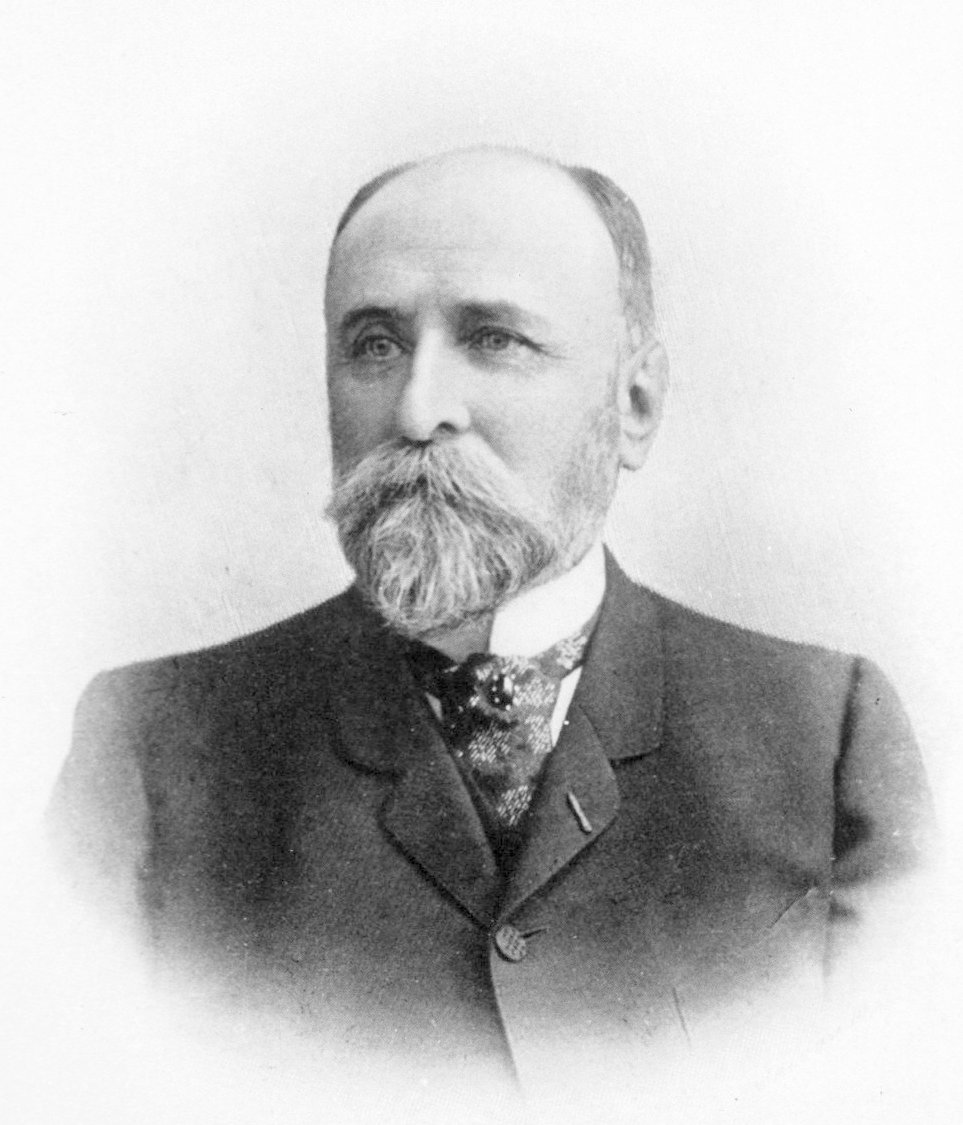
Alix Joffroy (1844-1908)

Alix Joffroy (16 December 1844, in Stainville – 24 November 1908) was a French neurologist and psychiatrist remembered for describing Joffroy's sign. He studied in Paris, earning his doctorate in 1873, becoming médecin des hôpitaux in 1879 and agrégé in 1880. He worked at the Pitié-Salpêtrière Hospital from 1885 and succeeded Benjamin Ball as professor of clinical psychiatry in 1893.

Jean-Martin Charcot encouraged him to study neurology, and together they demonstrated atrophy of anterior horn cells in the spinal cord in poliomyelitis in 1869.

== See also ==
- A Clinical Lesson at the Salpêtrière – 1887 group tableau portrait by André Brouillet
