= Jendrassik maneuver =

Medical maneuver to test reflexes

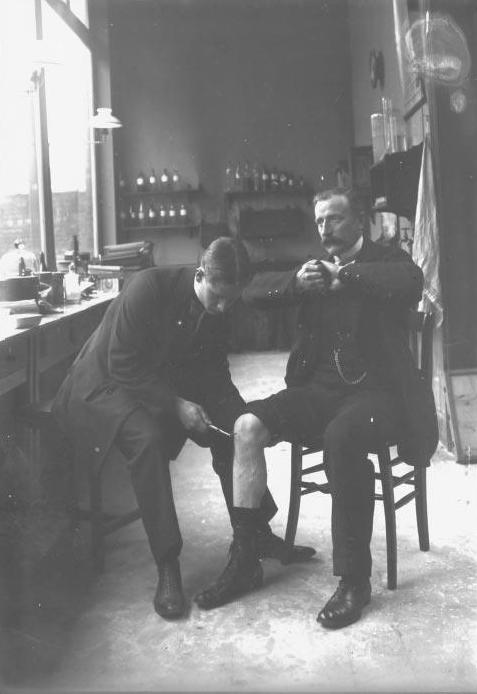
The Jendrassik maneuver to reinforce knee-jerk.

The Jendrassik maneuver is a medical maneuver wherein the patient clenches the teeth, flexes both sets of fingers into a hook-like form, and interlocks those sets of fingers together. The tendon below the patient's knee is then hit with a reflex hammer to elicit the patellar reflex. The elicited response is compared with the reflex result of the same action when the maneuver is not in use. Often a larger reflex response will be observed when the patient is occupied with the maneuver: "A weak or apparently missing reflex could be triggered by afferent activity resulting from such muscle tension. This is the true explanation for the maneuver, not a diversion of the patient’s attention — a misconception that can be heard even today." This effect was first observed in the late 19th century by Hungarian physician Ernő Jendrassik, after whom it was named.

This maneuver is particularly useful in that even if the patient is aware of the maneuver's purpose, it still functions properly.

The maneuver can also be used when performing other tests or procedures during which use of a patient-distracting method is considered useful and desirable. One such application would be when testing for Romberg's sign.
