= Bekhterev =

Bekhterev (Russian: Бехтерев) is a Russian masculine surname, its feminine counterpart is Bekhtereva. It may refer to:

- Dmitri Bekhterev (born 1949), Russian rower
- Natalia Bekhtereva (1924–2008), Russian neuroscientist and psychologist
  - 6074 Bechtereva, a minor planet
- Vladimir Bekhterev (1857–1927), Russian neurologist, grandfather of Natalia
  - Bekhterev–Jacobsohn reflex
  - Bekhterev–Mendel reflex
  - Bekhterev Psychoneurological Institute
  - Bekhterev Review of Psychiatry and Medical Psychology
  - Bekhterev's mixture
  - Bekhterev’s Disease
