= Alexander Kotsubinsky =

Russian psychiatrist

Alexander Petrovich Kotsubinsky
- Александр Петрович Коцюбинский
- Education: Leningrad Pediatric Institute
- Scientific career
- Fields: Psychiatry
- Workplaces: The Bekhterev Research Institute, St. Petersburg Medical Academy of Postgraduate Studies

Alexander Petrovich Kotsubinsky (Russian: Александр Петрович Коцюбинский) is a Russian psychiatrist, a spokesman of St. Petersburg psychiatric school.

== Education and career ==
Alexander Kotsubinsky graduated from Leningrad Pediatric Institute in 1964 and was in 1981 awarded the Candidate of Sciences degree for his dissertation The Peculiarities of Remissions in Faintly Progredient Schizophrenia (in Russian). He attained the M. D. degree in 2000. At present he is full professor in the Medical Academy of postgraduate education and head of the out-patient psychiatry department of the Bekhterev Psychoneurological Institute in St. Petersburg. His son Daniel Kotsubinsky is a Russian journalist and historian.

== Honours and awards ==
- Medal of the Order of Merit for the Fatherland, the 2nd class

== Selected publications ==
- Коцюбинский А. П. Шизофрения: уязвимость — диатез — стресс — заболевание = [Schizophrenia: susceptibility - diathesis - stress - disease] / А. П. Коцюбинский, А. И. Скорик, И. О. Аксенова, Н. С. Шейнина, В. В. Зайцев, Т. А. Аристова, Г. В. Бурковский, Б. Г. Бутома, А. А. Чумаченко. Предисловие Н. Г. Незнанова. — СПб.: Гиппократ +, 2004. — 336 с. ISBN 5-8232-0019-6
- Коцюбинский А. П. Социальная адаптация больных шизофренией с преобладанием дефицитарных расстройств / А. П. Коцюбинский, Е. Ф. Бажин // Шизофренический дефект (диагностика, патогенез, лечение). Под ред. Р. Я. Вовина. — СПб.: Минздрав РСФСР, ПНИ им. В. М. Бехтерева, 1991. — С. 155–168.
- Коцюбинский А. П. Место психотерапии в современных программах лечения и профилактики шизофрении / А. П. Коцюбинский, Н. С. Шейнина // XII съезд психиатров России (01–04.11.1995). — М., 1995. — С. 629–630.
- Коцюбинский А. П. Использование этологических принципов в психотерапии больных шизофренией / А. П. Коцюбинский, Н. С. Шейнина, Б. Г. Бутома // Шизофрения: Новые подходы к терапии: Сборник научных работ. — Харьков. — 1995. — Т. 2. — С. 129–230.
- Коцюбинский А. П. Об адаптации психически больных: (уточнение основных понятий) / А. П. Коцюбинский, Н. С. Шейнина // Обозр. психиатр. и мед. психол. им. В. М. Бехтерева. — 1996. — No. 2. — С. 203–212.
- Коцюбинский А.П. Значение психосоциальных факторов в этиопатогенезе шизофрении и социальной адаптации больных: Дисс. ... докт. мед. наук. — СПб., 1999.
- Коцюбинский, А.П.; Скорик, А.И. (2006). Оценка динамики психического состояния. Обозрение психиатрии и медицинской психологии им. В. М. Бехтерева (in Russian). 3 (2): 4–7. Archived from the original on 2011-10-21.
- Коцюбинский, А. П.; Шейнина, Н. С. (2012). Динамика эндогенных психических расстройств. Социальная и клиническая психиатрия (in Russian). 22 (2): 5–9.
