= Bechterew =

Bechterew may refer to:

- Bekhterev, surname
- Ankylosing spondylitis, previously known as Bechterew's disease
