= Christian school =

School run on Christian principles or by a Christian organization

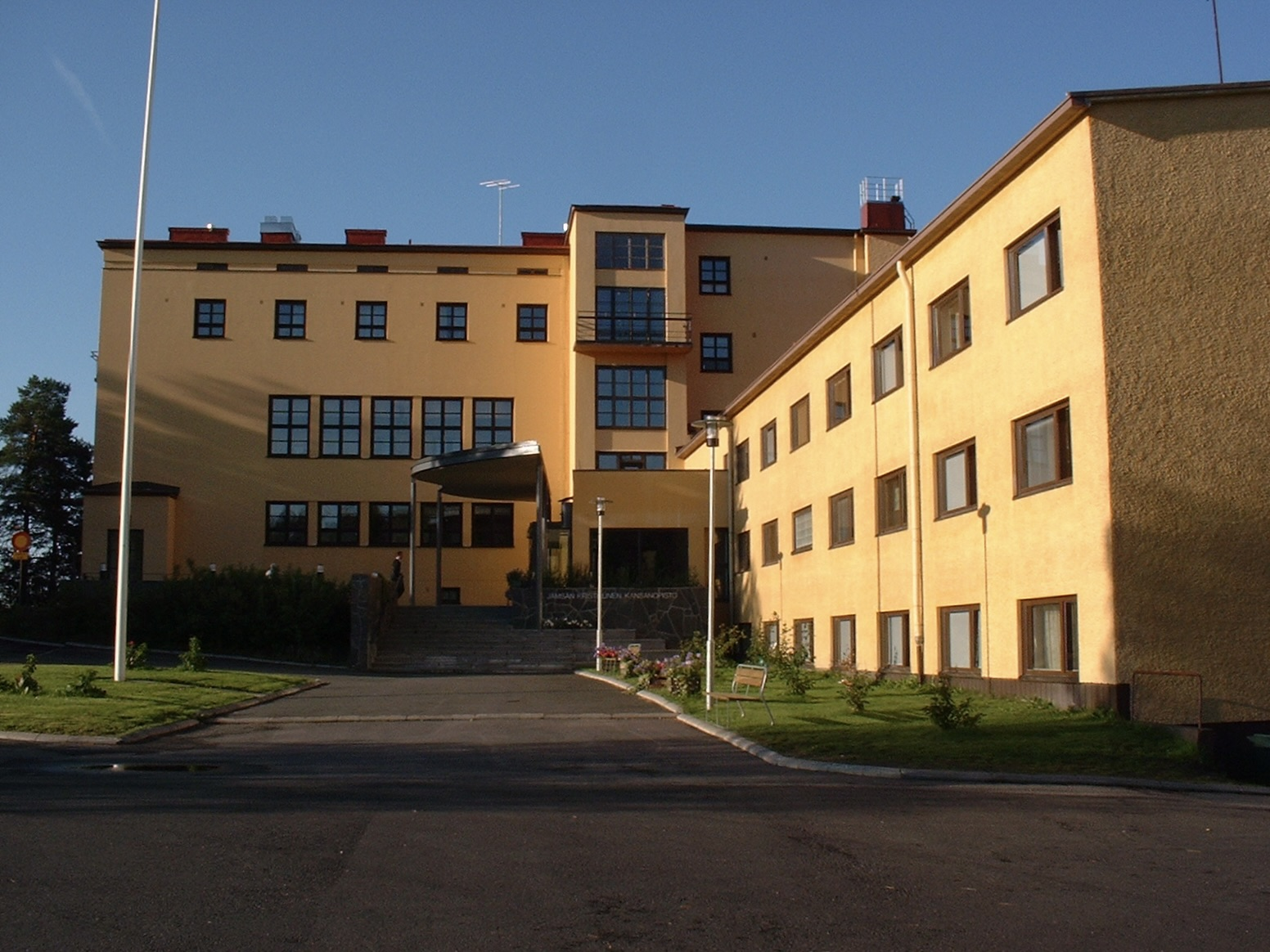
Christian Folk High School of Jämsä in Finland

A Christian school is a religious school run on Christian principles or by a Christian organization. These schools often include religious education and worship in their curriculum. They may also have a distinct Christian mission or philosophy.

The nature of Christian schools varies enormously from country to country, according to the religious, educational, and political cultures. In some countries, there is a strict separation of church and state, so all religious schools are private; in others, there is an established church whose teachings form an integral part of the state-operated educational system; in yet others, the state subsidizes religious schools of various denominations.

== Background ==
Traditionally, many Christian denominations have seen providing catechesis as a necessary part of the educational formation of children; the Emmanuel Association of Churches, a Methodist denomination in the conservative holiness movement teaches, for example:

It is our avowed conviction that the responsibility of molding the hearts and minds of our children is assigned by God primarily to the parents. In order to properly obey this Biblical injunction, we must provide a guarded Christian education for our children and young people. This may be accomplished either by the local church maintaining a Christian day school or by an association of Christian parents who, through a chosen board, employ Christian teaches that are qualified to educate children spiritually and intellectually in the light of God's Word.―Principles of Holy Living, Emmanuel Association of Churches

To this end, Christian Churches have established schools around the world.

== North America ==
=== United States ===
In the United States, religion is generally not taught by state-funded educational systems, though schools must allow students wanting to study religion to do so as an extracurricular activity, as they would with any other such activity.

Over 4 million students, about 1 child in 12, attend religious schools, most of them Christian.

There is great variety in the educational and religious philosophies of these schools, as might be expected from the large number of religious denominations in the United States.

==== Catholic ====
The largest system of Christian education in the United States is operated by the Catholic Church. As of 2011, there were 6,841 elementary and secondary schools enrolling about 2.2 million students. Most are administered by individual dioceses and parishes.

==== Baptist ====
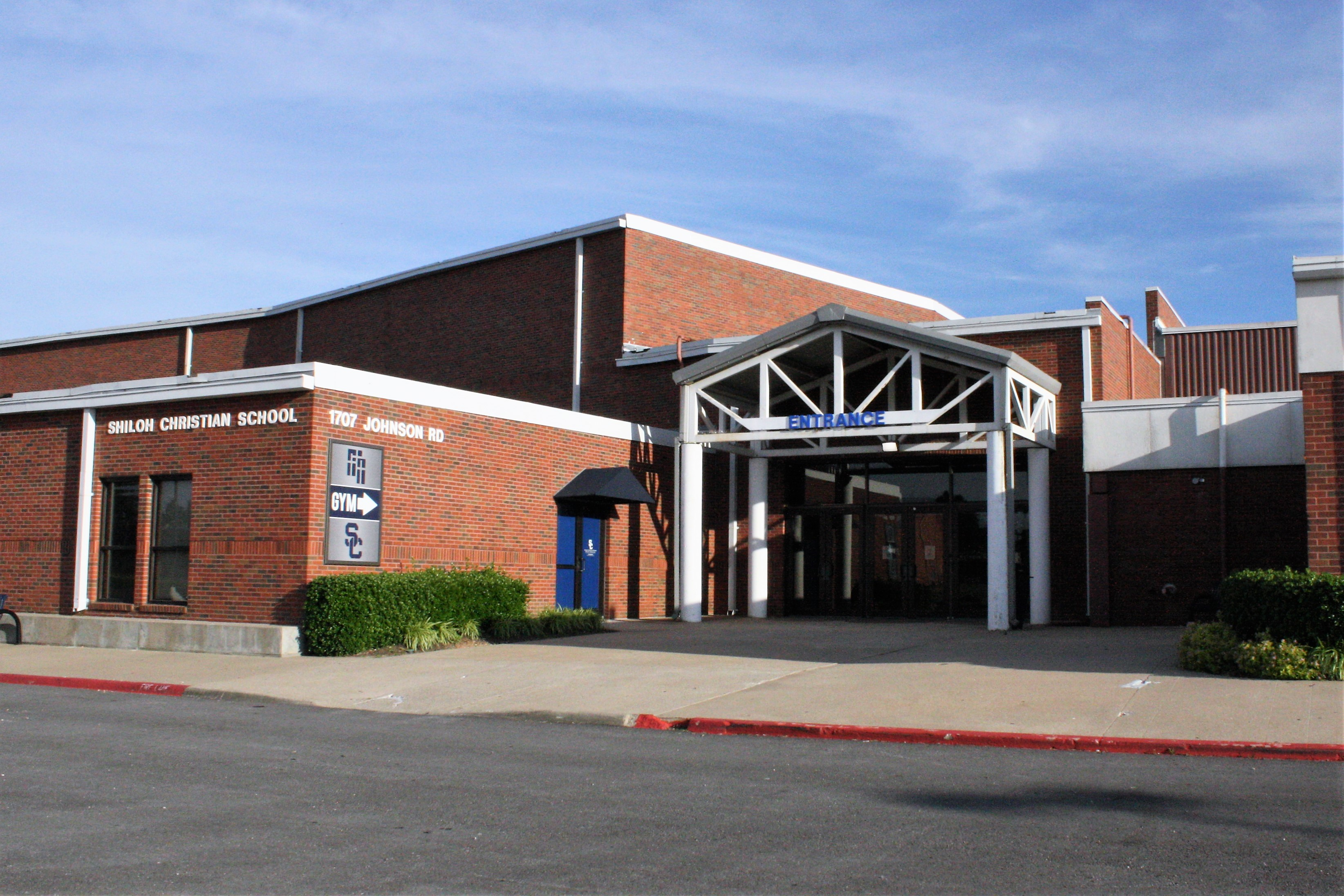
Shiloh Christian School in Springdale, Arkansas.

The Southern Baptist Convention has various affiliated primary and secondary schools, gathered in the Southern Baptist Association of Christian Schools.

==== Lutheran ====
The Lutheran Church–Missouri Synod (the primary conservative Lutheran denomination in the US) operates the largest Protestant school system in the United States. As of 2018, the LCMS operated 1,127 early childhood centers and preschools, 778 elementary schools, and 87 high schools. These schools educated more than 200,000 students and are taught by 21,000 teachers. Lutheran schools operated by the LCMS also exist in Hong Kong and mainland China. The Wisconsin Evangelical Lutheran Synod currently operates 403 early childhood centers, 313 elementary schools, and 25 high schools as of 2018.

==== Episcopal ====
The Episcopal Church in the United States of America maintains approximately 1,200 schools, of which about 50 are secondary schools and which educate about 2% of all students in private schools or 0.22% (115,000 students) of the school population in the United States. Although there are relatively few Episcopal schools, many, such as the Groton School in Massachusetts and St Paul's in New Hampshire, and have played a significant role in the development of the American prep school. Episcopal schools are far more likely to be independent, with little outside control, than their Roman Catholic counterparts. Many Episcopal high schools have an annual tuition well in excess of $15,000, slightly higher the average for non-sectarian private schools and far higher than the average for non-Roman Catholic religious schools (approx. $7,100 per annum) and over twice the average for Roman Catholic high schools (approx. $6,000 per annum).

==== Methodist ====
The United Methodist Church and Allegheny Wesleyan Methodist Connection operate parochial schools and colleges throughout the United States.

==== Conservative Evangelical ====
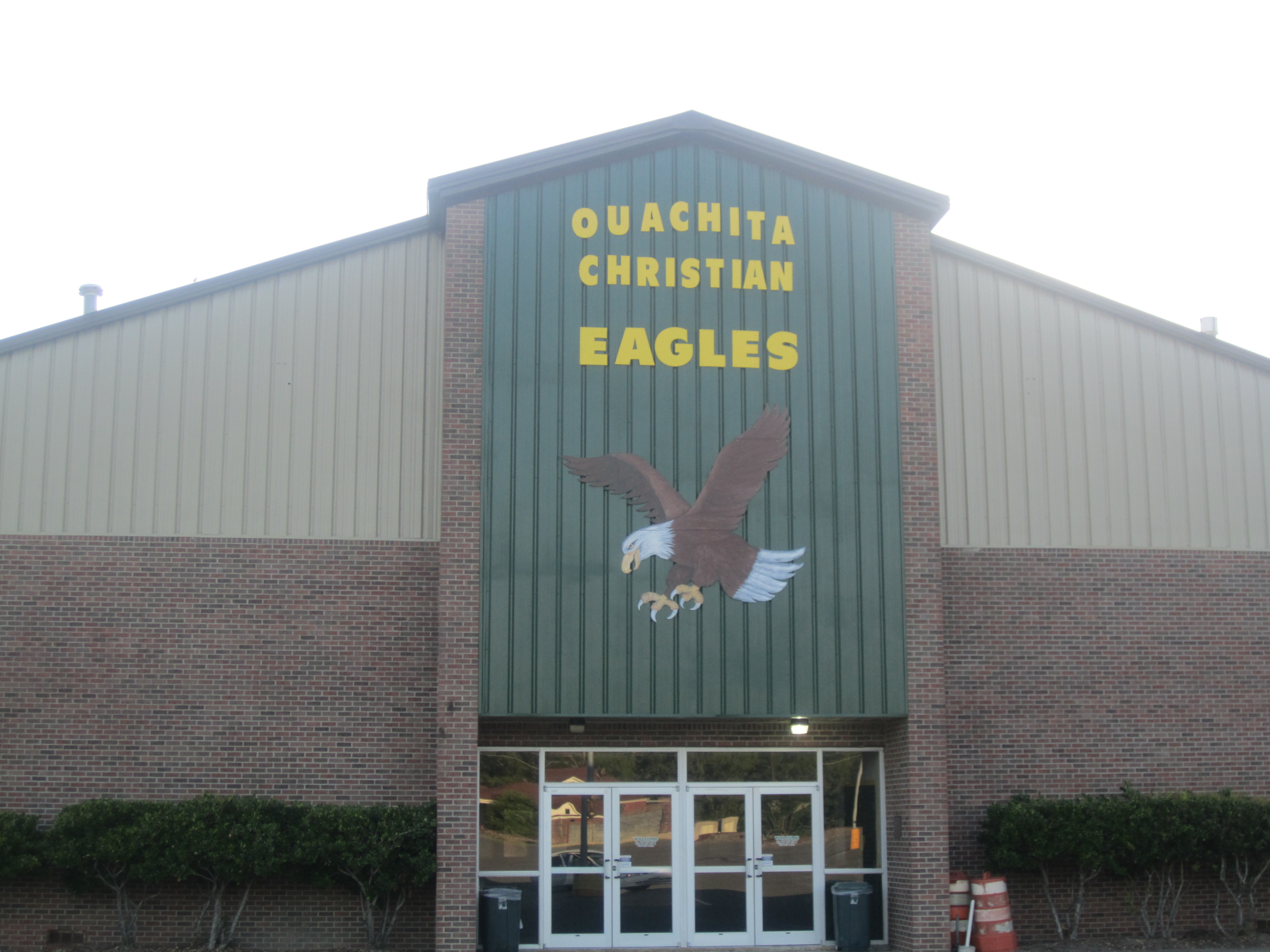
The Ouachita Christian School operates on this campus off U.S. Highway 165 in Monroe, Louisiana.

Many conservative Evangelicals in the United States reserve the term "Christian school" for schools affiliated with conservative Evangelical denominations, often excluding Catholic schools in particular.

These conservative Evangelical schools are privately run, often in conjunction with a church or a denomination. Parents who want their children taught according to the principles of their church, can choose to send their children to such schools, but unless the school is subsidized by their church, or is part of a school choice or education voucher program funded by the government, they must pay tuition. Some American Evangelical schools are large and well-funded, while others are small and rely on volunteers from the community.

Some Evangelical schools, especially those sponsored by fundamentalist groups, do not accept government funding and subsidies because (in their opinion) they would put their school (and potentially their church) operations under more government scrutiny and legislation, which can lead to the government dictating their school's operation (and, possibly, the church's teachings on controversial subjects such as abortion or homosexuality). An example of this would be a requirement to adhere to a state's civil rights law, in exchange for the subsidy, this would conflict with a Christian school that has mandatory religious requirements for admission, or does not allow its students to opt out of attending religious services. Even though a school may accept no government money, it still must adhere to the state education curriculum, student academic performance standards, and state-mandated standardized testing scores (if any). It is also subject to standard inspection by government regulators for in-classroom teaching quality and teacher qualifications, possibly including visiting classes. Not accepting government money avoids government management of an Evangelical school, but does not remove governmental oversight.

Another large association of Evangelical schools is the Association of Christian Schools International (ACSI). ACSI serves 5,300 member schools in approximately 100 countries with an enrollment of nearly 1.2 million students. The American Association of Christian Schools, founded in 1972, brings together many conservative Evangelical schools. Members subscribe to a Statement of Faith based on Biblical literalism, creationism, and a rejection of ecumenism. AACS member schools enroll over 100,000 students. The AACS has an active lobbying program in Washington.

Another association of Evangelical schools is Christian Schools International, with approximately 500 schools and 100,000 students.

One movement among Evangelical schools in the U.S. is the return to the traditional subjects and form of education known as classical education. This growing movement is known as the Classical Christian School movement, represented by the Association of Classical & Christian Schools, with over 230 schools and colleges, and about 34,000 students.

==== Adventist ====
According to the Seventh-day Adventist Church, the largest Protestant school system in the world is the Seventh-day Adventist educational system. The Seventh-day Adventist Church has a total of 6,709 educational institutions operating in over 100 countries around the world with over 1.2 million students worldwide. The North American Division Office of Education oversees 1,049 schools with 65,000 students in the United States, Canada, and Bermuda.

==== Mennonites ====
Conservative Mennonites, Old Order Mennonites, and Amish groups all operate their own private schools and have published their own curriculum since the early 1960s.

==== Other ====
The Eastern Orthodox Church and the Church of Jesus Christ of Latter-day Saints also operate parochial private schools throughout the United States.

=== Canada ===
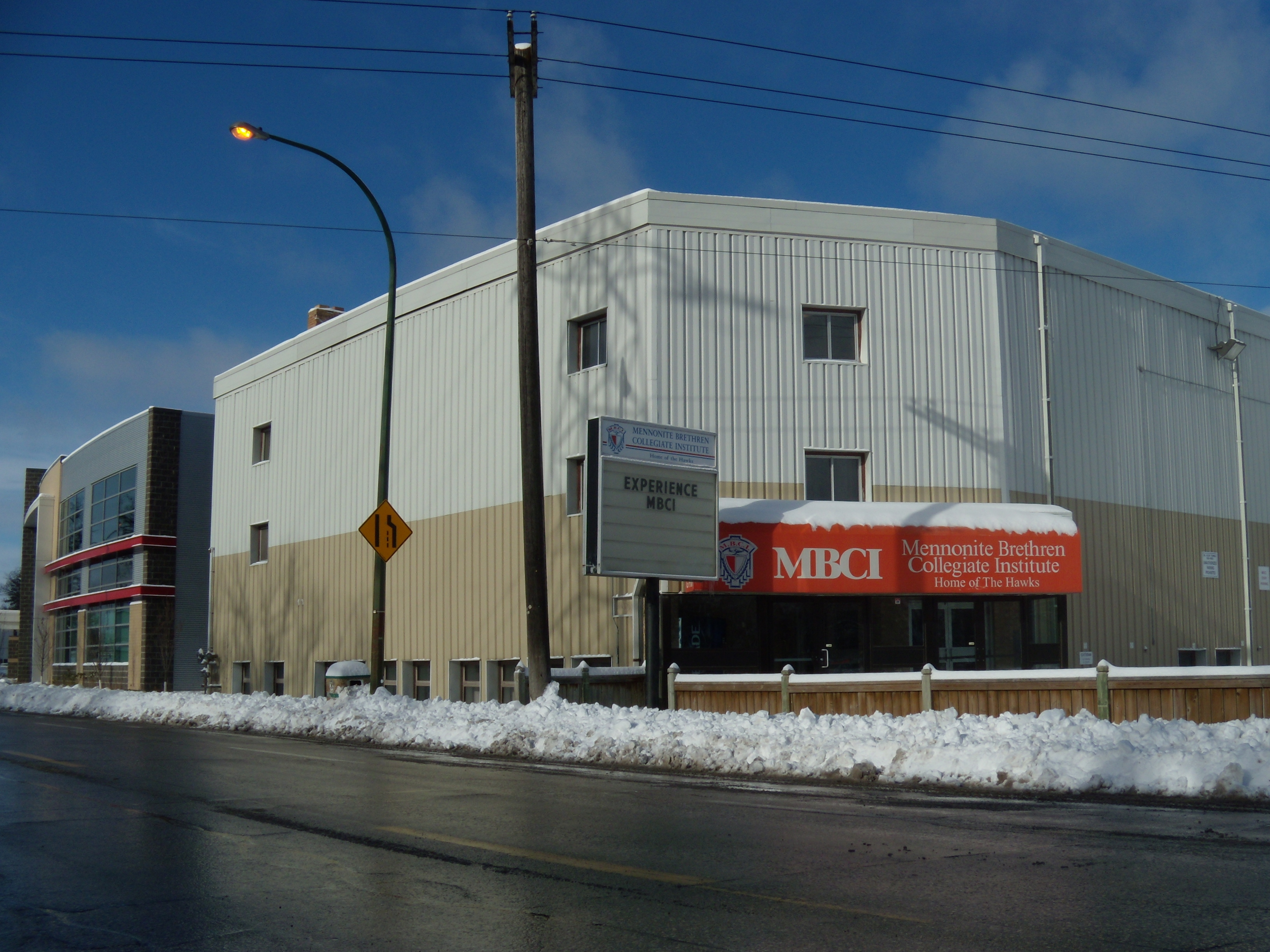
Mennonite Brethren Collegiate Institute in Winnipeg, Manitoba

In Canada, public funding of religious education is permitted and sometimes required. Many Christian schools in Canada are non-denominational, meaning they are not affiliated with a specific branch of Christianity. Other schools are denominational; they are affiliated with a particular branch. For instance, they might be Catholic, Protestant, Orthodox, or follow some other denomination. Among these, Catholic schools receive the most funding from the government; many of them receive funding for both the secular and religious component of their curriculum.

Historically, Christian schools in Canada were run by private Catholic or Protestant organizations. As public education developed, the majority (usually Protestant) faith became represented by the public school, and the minority faith (usually Catholic) became represented by a separate school. Over time, the public schools became increasingly secularized as Canadian society became increasingly pluralistic.

Most provinces originally had separate school boards in each school district for Catholic and non-Catholic students. Many provinces have abolished this, but Ontario, Alberta, Saskatchewan and the Northwest Territories retain the system. Where this occurs, the two schools are usually called the Catholic School Board and the Public School Board.

Many non-Catholic Christians send their children to separate Catholic schools, preferring their values and standards, despite not practicing the Catholic faith. Typically, such students are exempt from specific religious instruction classes.

The American model is also used on some private schools, usually run by Protestant denominations.

Public school boards (as distinct from Catholic boards) in Canada normally have no religious affiliation in modern times but may still accommodate religious instruction for Christians within their community. They may do this by creating an individual special purpose Christian school, or they may offer religious instruction within an otherwise secular school. This practice has become so prevalent in Alberta that many private Christian schools have been absorbed by their local public districts as "alternative Christian programs" within the public system. They are presently permitted to retain their philosophy, curriculum, and staffing while operating as fully funded public schools. In this regard, they have achieved some equality with Catholic schools.

These private schools can be associated with a number of different organizations. Some are affiliated with the Association of Christian Schools International, some with Christian Schools International, and some with other organizations. There are also provincial organizations like the Ontario Alliance of Christian Schools a d the Prairie Association of Christian Schools.

== Europe ==
=== United Kingdom ===
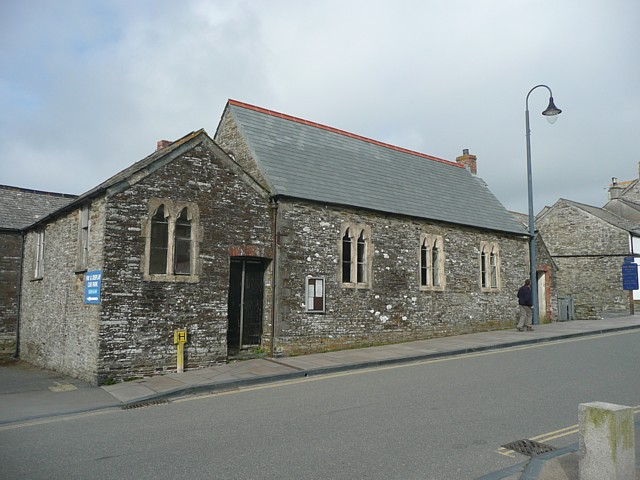
The former church school, Tintagel, Cornwall

In the United Kingdom, church schools are more generally referred to as faith schools. In 2012, 33.75% of all maintained schools and 23.13% of all academies in England were faith schools, a total of 6,830 institutions.

The Church of England was historically a provider of many schools throughout England. Such schools (called 'Church of England schools') were partially absorbed into the state education system (in the Education Act 1944), with the church retaining an influence on the schools in return for its support in funding and staffing. Such schools are required to accept pupils regardless of religious background, though if they are oversubscribed, they can, and often do, give preference to applicants of the relevant faith. As of February 2017, there are 3,731 state schools and 906 academies in England that are church schools. Approximately one quarter of all primary schools in England are Church of England schools and 15 million people alive today went to a Church of England school.

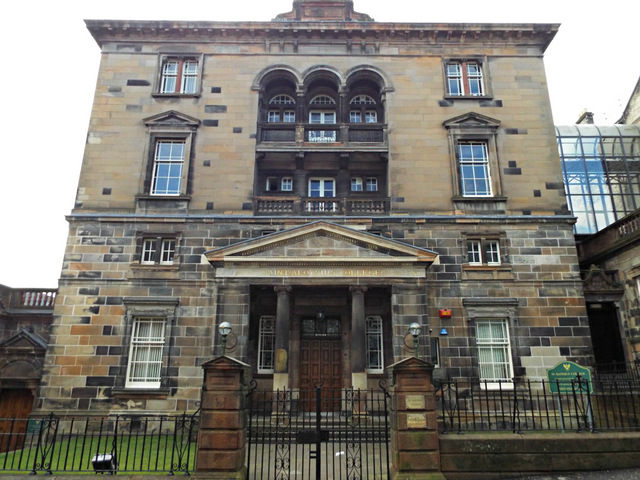
St Aloysius College, Glasgow (RC)

Because of the availability of church-run schools and the tolerance for religious activity in state schools, private Christian schools are a relative rarity, but do exist throughout the country. One of the larger ones, the Liverpool Christian Fellowship School, made national headlines in 2001 when they led a campaign backed by forty other schools, to retain their right to use caning and other corporal punishments, which was outlawed in 1999. They intended to halt what they felt was a decline of discipline within schools. Other Christian schools include Kingsfold Christian School in Lancashire, Carmel Christian School in Bristol, Grangewood Independent School in London, Mannafields Christian School in Edinburgh, Emmanuel Christian School in Leicester, Derby & Walsall, & The River School in Worcester, among others.

=== The Netherlands ===
In the Netherlands the question whether or not public schools should be Christian and in what way was subject of much debate between 1806 and 1917. During the second half of the 19th century this school struggle reached its summit and dominated politics along with voting rights and the district system. In 1917 most of these three matters were resolved by the Pacification of 1917. From then on both confessional (religious) and public schools would get equal funding. Schools grounded in a religious denomination are treated as a type of distinct education (bijzonder onderwijs) and governed by their own institutions separate from that for mainstream schools.

In the second half of 2006 there were 6,318 Christian schools in the Netherlands; 4,955 primary schools, 1,054 high schools and 309 colleges and universities.

=== Russia ===
Russian Orthodoxy is the major form of Christianity practiced in Russia. The Orthodox Church began systemic participation in the elementary education field in Russia in 1884 under the "Statute on Church-parish schools". In the following two decades, many privately initiated, illegal "literacy schools" started by peasants were also regularised by placing them under the control of the Church. Privately founded Orthodox schools not under direct church control played an important role in the spread of Orthodoxy among Russian minorities, prominent examples being the Kazan Central Baptised Tatar School, founded in 1863, or the Simbirsk Central Chuvash School, founded in 1868.

There are also Protestant-associated schools aimed at the children of expatriates, such as the International Academy of St. Petersburg, Russia, founded in 1993.

== Oceania ==
=== Australia ===
Parochial schools (Church schools) were established in Australia by both Roman Catholic and Protestant churches during the 19th century. Many of these schools, many of which with long traditions, continue to form the bulk of the private or independent school sector in Australia.

The modern Protestant Christian school movement began in Australia through the efforts of Dutch migrants who had enjoyed Christian schools for many decades in their home country. Most belonged to one of the Australian reformed churches of Dutch origin (the Christian Reformed Churches of Australia or the Free Reformed Churches of Australia, sometimes incorrectly called the Dutch Reformed Church, which is a name used in the Netherlands, South Africa and Sri Lanka but never in the Australian context). During the 1950s these migrants founded associations of parents who wanted to start Christian schools, and the first schools opened, at first without any government assistance, in the late 1950s and early 1960s.

The Free Reformed Church started the John Calvin School at Armadale, Western Australia which opened its doors on 2 December 1957 with 70 students. It was followed by schools in Albany, Western Australia (1962) and Launceston, Tasmania (1965). The Reformed Churches of Australia (which added 'Christian' to the beginning of their name only in the 1990s) opened their first school at Kingston, Tasmania in 1962. Their first schools were affiliated with a national body known at that time as the National Union of Christian Parent-Controlled Schools, which later became Christian Parent Controlled Schools Ltd. (CPCS), and in 2008 was again renamed to become Christian Education National.

Whereas the Free Reformed schools enrolled only students from that particular denomination, the Reformed Church-initiated schools were operated by associations of parents who individually belonged to a variety of Protestant churches and who worked collectively for their common aim. These schools were established not because of innate dissatisfaction with government schools, but because these parents wanted schools which would actively integrate their Christian faith into the whole school curriculum. The schools were operated by parent bodies apart from supervision of churches.

From the late 1970s, Christians from many other churches became increasingly concerned about standards and social change in government schools and started establishing Christian schools to provide an alternative education option. In this phase, many such schools were commenced not by parent associations but by churches themselves, although several parent groups from outside the Reformed Churches studied and adopted the parent-controlled model and have commenced schools which, while they have no Dutch or Reformed Church connections, have still affiliated themselves nationally with many schools which do.

The leading umbrella organizations include Anglican Schools Australia, Christian Schools Australia, Lutheran Education Australia (LEA), Christian Education National (formerly Christian Parent Controlled Schools Ltd), and the Australian Association of Christian Schools. This last body mainly functions as a political advisory and lobby group for Christian Education National as well as a number of Christian schools who are members independently.

== Africa ==
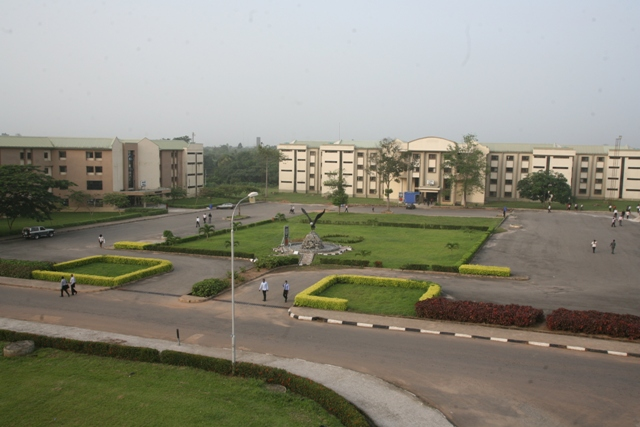
Covenant University in Ota, Ogun State, Nigeria.

In many parts of Africa Christian missionary organisations have founded schools, often in places where no other schooling is available. Such schools generally provide a complete education in a Christian context. In Nigeria, Living Faith Church Worldwide has established several educational institutions, including Covenant University, Landmark University and Faith Academy.

A Pew Center study about religion and education around the world in 2016, found that "there is a large and pervasive gap in educational attainment between Muslims and Christians in sub-Saharan Africa" as Muslim adults in this region are far less educated than their Christian counterparts, with scholars suggesting that this gap is due to the educational facilities that were created by Christian missionaries during the colonial era for fellow believers.

== Asia ==
=== Israel ===
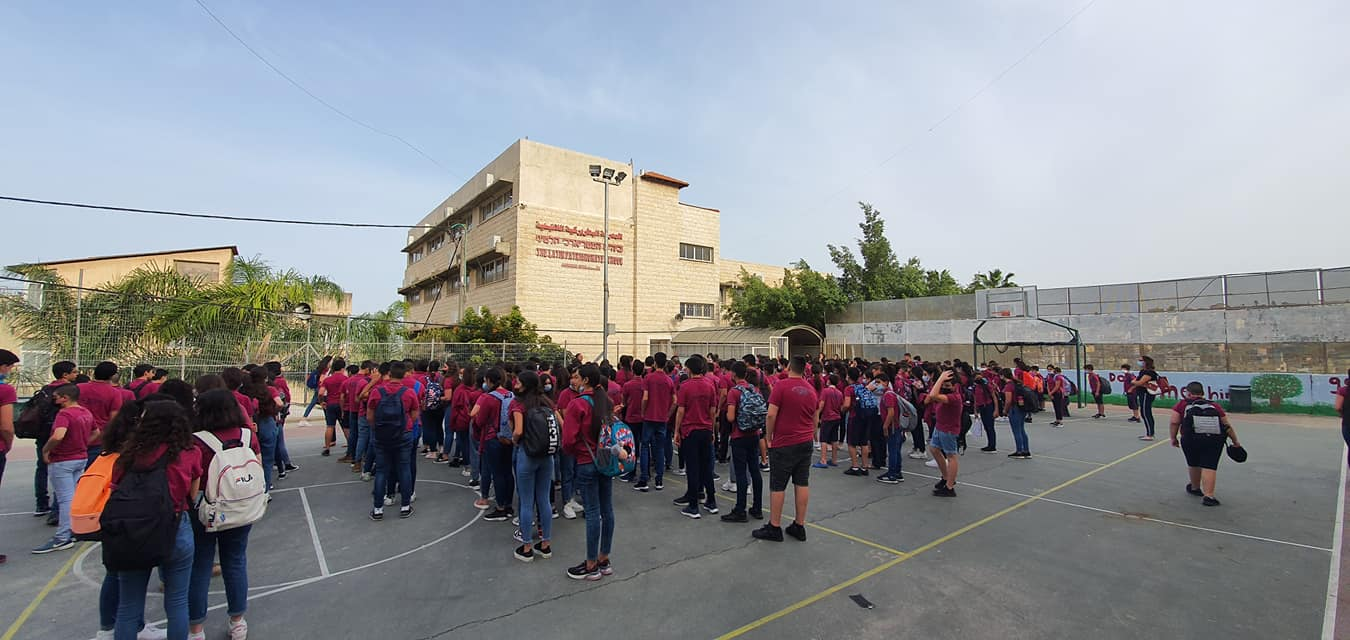
Latin patriarchal school in Reineh.

According to the study "Are Christian Arabs the New Israeli Jews? Reflections on the Educational Level of Arab Christians in Israel" by Hanna David from the University of Tel Aviv, one of the factors why Arab Christians are the most educated segment of Israel's population is the high level of the Christian educational institutions. Christian schools in Israel are among the best schools in the country, and while those schools represent only 4% of the Arab schooling sector, about 34% of Arab university students come from Christian schools, and about 87% of the Israeli Arabs in the high tech sector have been educated in Christian schools.

Many Druze and Muslims attend Christian schools in Israel, because Christian schools are high-performing and among the best schools in the country.

=== Lebanon ===
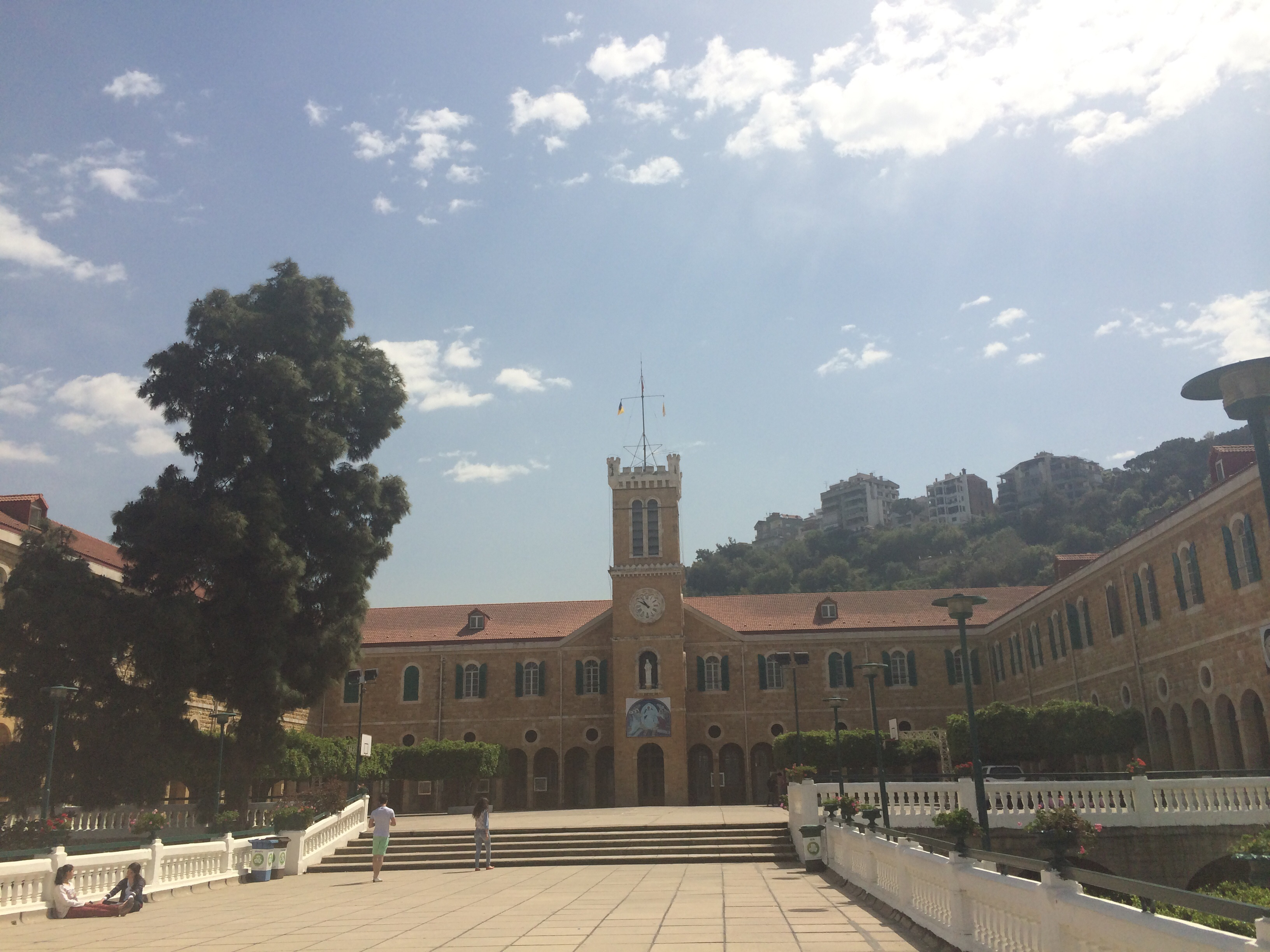
Collège Saint Joseph in Aintoura.

Since the sixteenth century, prominent Druze feudal families have welcomed Protestant missionaries, as well as, Catholic missionaries like Franciscans, Jesuits, Carmelites, and Lazarites to the region, all of whom contributed to the spread of education and literacy. Under Fakhr al-Din II rule, printing presses were introduced and Jesuit priests and Catholic monks and nuns encouraged to open schools throughout Mount Lebanon. In 1791, Pope Pius VI sent a letter to Bashir Jumblatt, expressing gratitude for allowing the Maronites to build more churches in the Chouf area.

During the nineteenth and twentieth centuries, Protestant missionaries established schools and churches in Druze strongholds, with some Druze converting to Protestant Christianity. In 1870 many Christian schools were opened in Lebanon, which were among the main centers of the renaissance (Nahda) and this led to the establishment of schools, universities, theater and printing presses. The remainder of the 19th century saw a relative period of stability, as Druze and Maronite groups focused on economic and cultural development which saw the founding of the American University of Beirut (Syrian Protestant College) and Saint Joseph University and a flowering of literary and political activity associated with the attempts to liberalize the Ottoman Empire.

== Associations ==
- American Association of Christian Schools
- Association of Christian Schools International
- Association of Classical Christian Schools
- Christian Schools International
- National Association of University-Model Schools
- Nazarene International Education Association

== See also ==
- Christian college
- Charter school
- Homeschooling

== Bibliography ==
- Hein, David (August 8, 2013). "Christianity and Honor". The Living Church.
