= Kurt Mendel =

German neurologist

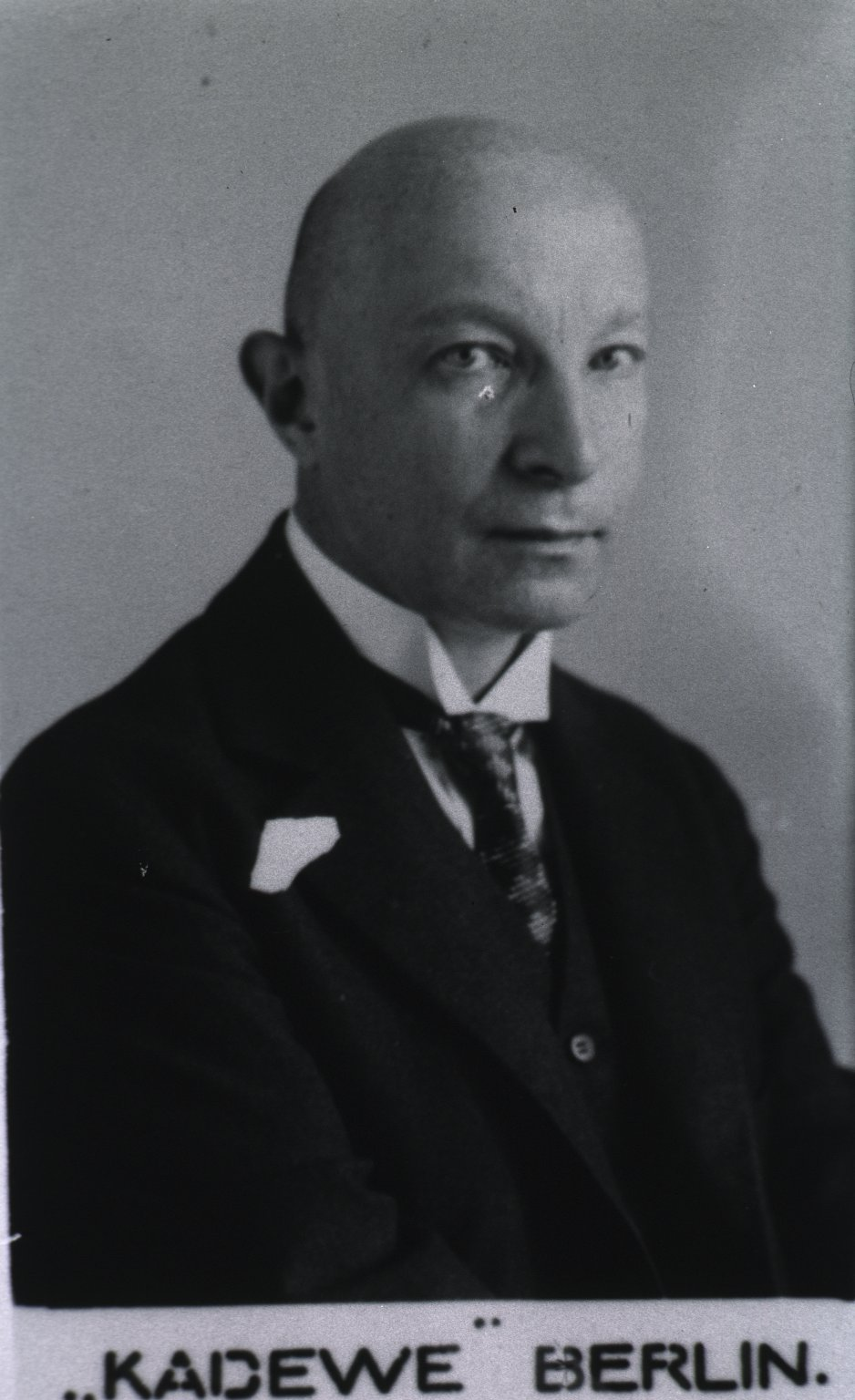
Kurt Mendel 1874–1946)

Kurt Mendel (January 27, 1874 - 1946) was a German neurologist who was a native of Berlin, of Jewish origins.

In 1897 he received his doctorate from Kiel, and in 1899 went to work at the policlinic of Emanuel Mendel (1839-1907) in Berlin. Kurt Mendel was an editor of Neurologisches Zentralblatt.

With Russian neurophysiologist Vladimir Bekhterev (1857-1927), the eponymous Mendel-Bekhterev reflex is named, which is flexion of the toes caused by percussion of the upper surface of the foot, a sign of lesions of the pyramidal tract.

Mendel was a critic of Sigmund Freud (1856-1939). He mentioned that Freud's psychoanalytical teachings offered a valuable perspective, however he believed that they contained excessive exaggeration and fantasy. He was also repulsed by some aspects of Freud's views on sexuality. Mendel was an outspoken opponent of Hermann Oppenheim (1858-1919), regarding the latter's theory of psychic changes perpetrated by organic disturbances within the brain due to psychological trauma.
