= Nanaimo Christian School =

School in British Columbia, Canada

Coordinates: 49.1726°N 123.9989°W

Information
- Established: 1977; 49 years ago
- Website: www.ncsnanaimo.com

Nanaimo Christian School is a combined elementary, middle school and high school in Nanaimo, British Columbia, Canada. It was established in 1977. The current Head of School is Mike Campbell.

== Programs ==
=== Elementary ===
Subjects include "informal" French in primary grades, French (4-5), Opera (3-5). The Theme (traditional disciplines of Language Arts [English], Social Studies, Science, Fine Arts, P. Arts, Bible, Spelling, etc.) chapels, extracurricular sports, service projects and the like make up the typical student timetable.

=== Middle school ===
Subjects in Middle school (6-8) include French (6-8), Health (6-8), Math, and Theme (traditional disciplines of Language Arts [English], Social Studies, Science, Bible). Along with extracurricular sports and other optional classes.

=== High school ===
The High School (9-12) offer a lot of traditional subjects that include: Math, Humanities, (Social studies, history and English) and French. This is complemented by other courses that include Physical Education, and Bible. Students are involved in weekly chapels, morning devotions, and extracurricular sports. Most classes range from 20 to 30 students each.

== Musical ==
Musical theatre (Junior: grades 9-10 and Senior: grades 11-12) is a course at Nanaimo Christian School and is taken very seriously. NCS's senior musical theatre has put on sold-out productions of: Les Misérables (2004), Seven Brides for Seven Brothers (2005), Fiddler on the Roof (2006), Annie (2006), West Side Story (2007), 42nd Street (musical) (2008), Wizard of Oz (2009) and Anne of Green Gables: The Musical in 2010. In 2011 they did a production of The Lion, the Witch, and the Wardrobe, as well as A Christmas Story. The grade 9's and 10's performances included "Memories of Friendship", which they wrote themselves in 2009, and "Merry Christmas Charlie Brown/The Grinch" in 2010. The program grew in the fall of 2006 with the addition of the Junior Musical program. This means that the theatre teachers get to work with their theatre students for four years.

== Credentials ==
Nanaimo Christian School is certified by the Province of British Columbia. It is rated, educationally, as a group one school under the Independent School Act. This ensures that it is operated by an "authority" (board of directors) and established as a society.

The board, elected by participating members of its non-profit society, has authority under the Society Act and Independent School Act. The board takes guidance in educational matters from its membership with external service organizations - the Society of Christian Schools in B.C. (SCSBC), the Federation of Independent Schools Association and Christian Schools International. The administration team (Principal, Vice-Principal, curriculum coordinators and assistants) is involved in the Christian Principals Association of B.C. All the teachers have membership in the Christian Teacher Association of B.C. Finally, all the staff may also be involved in SCSBC committee structure. The staff participates with parents in the school's internal committee structure to shape the curriculum and overall school program.

== Facilities ==
NCS has three main buildings on a 6-acre (24,000 m^{2}) campus and holds a 5-acre field across the road. The gym houses two full volleyball courts with room for basketball. The school has a large playing field. School property borders on city parkland designated to be converted to recreational use. The school hopes to jointly participate in that conversion and has purchased the land.
