= Boris Karvasarsky =

- Born: 3 February 1931; Derazhnia, Khmelnytskyi Oblast, Ukraine
- Died: 24 September 2013 (aged 82)
- Citizenship: Russia
- Known for: Personality-oriented (reconstructive) psychotherapy
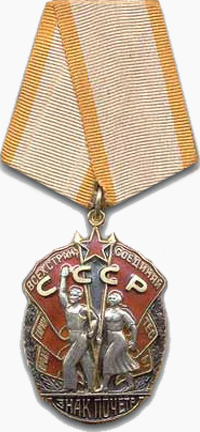
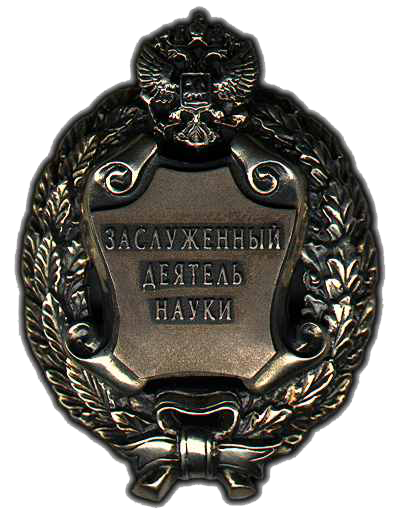
- Awards
- Scientific career
- Fields: Psychiatry, psychotherapy
- Workplaces: St. Petersburg Bekhterev Psychoneurological Research Institute

Boris Dmitrievich Karvasarsky (Russian: Борис Дмитриевич Карвасарский; 3 February 1931 – 24 September 2013) was a Russian psychiatrist, a disciple of V. N. Myasishchev.

== Biography ==
=== Education ===
Karvasarsky was born in Derazhnia, Ukraine, on 3 February 1931. In 1954 he graduated from S.M. Kirov Military Medical Academy. Then he completed postgraduate courses in the Bekhterev Psychoneurological Institute and was awarded the Degree of Candidate of Science in 1961. He attained his M. D. degree at the age of 37 (in 1968).

=== Scientific work ===
Karvasarsky headed the Department of Neuroses and Psychotherapy in the Bekhterev Research Institute from 1961 until his death. During the period of 1982 until 1993 he also held the chair of Child-Adolescent Psychotherapy in Leningrad Institute for Postgraduate Medical Education. In 1986, he became Head of the Republican Center for Scientific and Methodic Coordination in Psychotherapy.

The objectives of the center include annual analysis of the state of psychotherapeutic services in Russia and ongoing education of the specialists rendering psychotherapeutic treatment to the population.

He worked as editorial board member of several journals including The Bekhterev Review of Psychiatry and Medical Psychology and the Bulletin of Psychotherapy. He was president of the Russian Psychotherapeutic Association until his death. He has also been chief psychotherapist of the Ministry of Health and Social Development of the Russian Federation for about 20 years.

Proceeding from V. Myasishchev's ideas and his conception of pathogenetic psychotherapy, Karvasarsky elaborated personality-oriented (reconstructive) psychotherapy. After making a special study of this psychotherapeutic approach, some research workers concluded it to be nothing but "Soviet psychoanalysis." Its proponents, however, challenge such a characterisation. When treating neuroses, associates of the Bekhterev Psychoneurological Institute mainly make use of personality-oriented (reconstructive) psychotherapy. The method has not been extensively used in other regions of today's Russia, but has been shown capable of yielding satisfactory results in patients with different mental disorders related to borderline psychiatry.

== Awards ==
Karvasarsky has been the recipient of numerous awards including the Order of the Badge of Honour and the title of Honoured Scientist of the Russian Federation.

== Publications ==
He has published over 200 scientific works, among them books Psychotherapy (Leningrad, 1985) and Neuroses: Textbook for Doctors (Moscow, 1980, 2nd ed., 1990). Papers in English

- Karvasarski B. D. Psychotherapy. – Soviet neurology a. psychiatry. 1988–1989 / Vol. XXI, N. 4. – New York: M. E. Sharpe, 1989, pp. 6–85.
- Karvasarski B. D. Personality-oriented psychotherapy. American psychiatric association 142nd Annual Meeting May 6–11, 1989, San Francisco, California, p. 280.
