= Deutsche Schule Sankt Petersburg =

Coordinates: 59.9519°N 30.2604°E

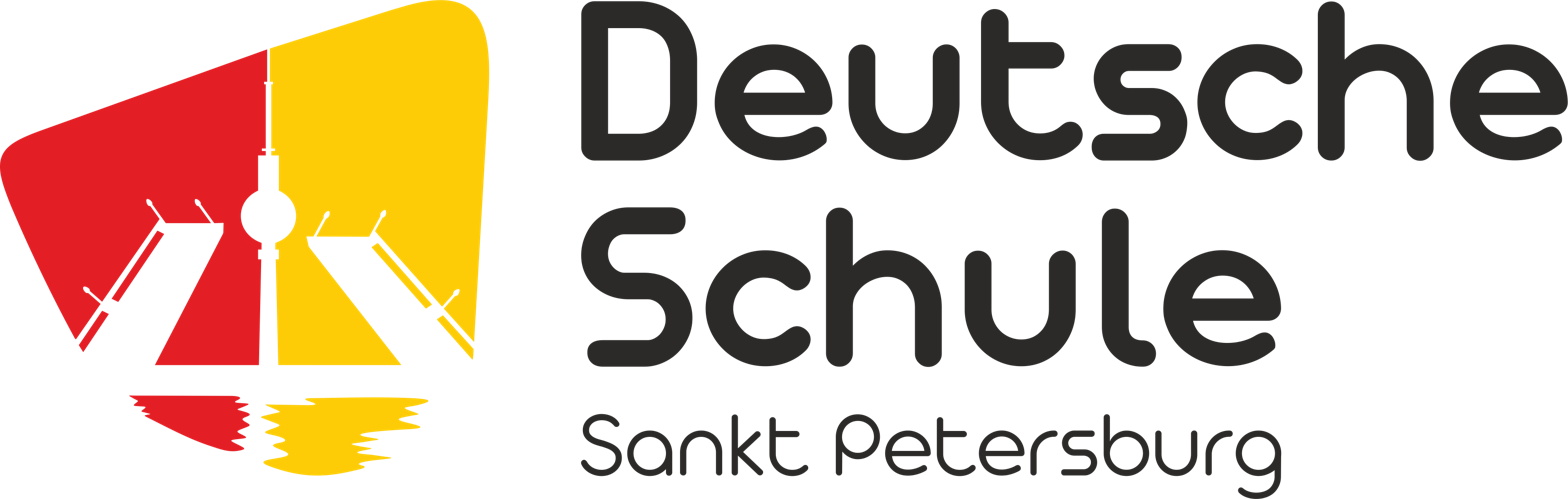
- German School St. Petersburg Logo
- St. Petersburg; Russia

Information
- Type: German international school
- Established: September 2009
- Grades: Vorschule through grade 10

Deutsche Schule Sankt Petersburg (DSP) is a German international school in St. Petersburg, Russia. As of 2010 it served levels Vorschule (preschool) through grade 10, with plans to expand to grade 12 and the Abitur. The German government and the Central Agency for German Schools Abroad supported the school, which was founded in September 2009.

== See also ==
- List of higher education and academic institutions in Saint Petersburg
- History of Germans in Russia, Ukraine and the Soviet Union
