= Bekhterev–Mendel reflex =

- Differential diagnosis: Pyramidal tract lesions

The Bekhterev–Mendel reflex, also known as the Mendel reflex or Mendel–Bekhterev reflex, is a clinical sign found in patients with pyramidal tract lesions. Percussion of the dorsum of the foot causes flexion, or downward movement, of the second to the fifth toes in patients with pyramidal tract lesions, whereas percussion of the dorsum of the foot in normal patients causes extension of the toes.

It is analogous to the Bekhterev–Jacobsohn reflex in the upper limb.

The reflex is named after Vladimir Bekhterev and Kurt Mendel.
