= List of higher education and academic institutions in Saint Petersburg =

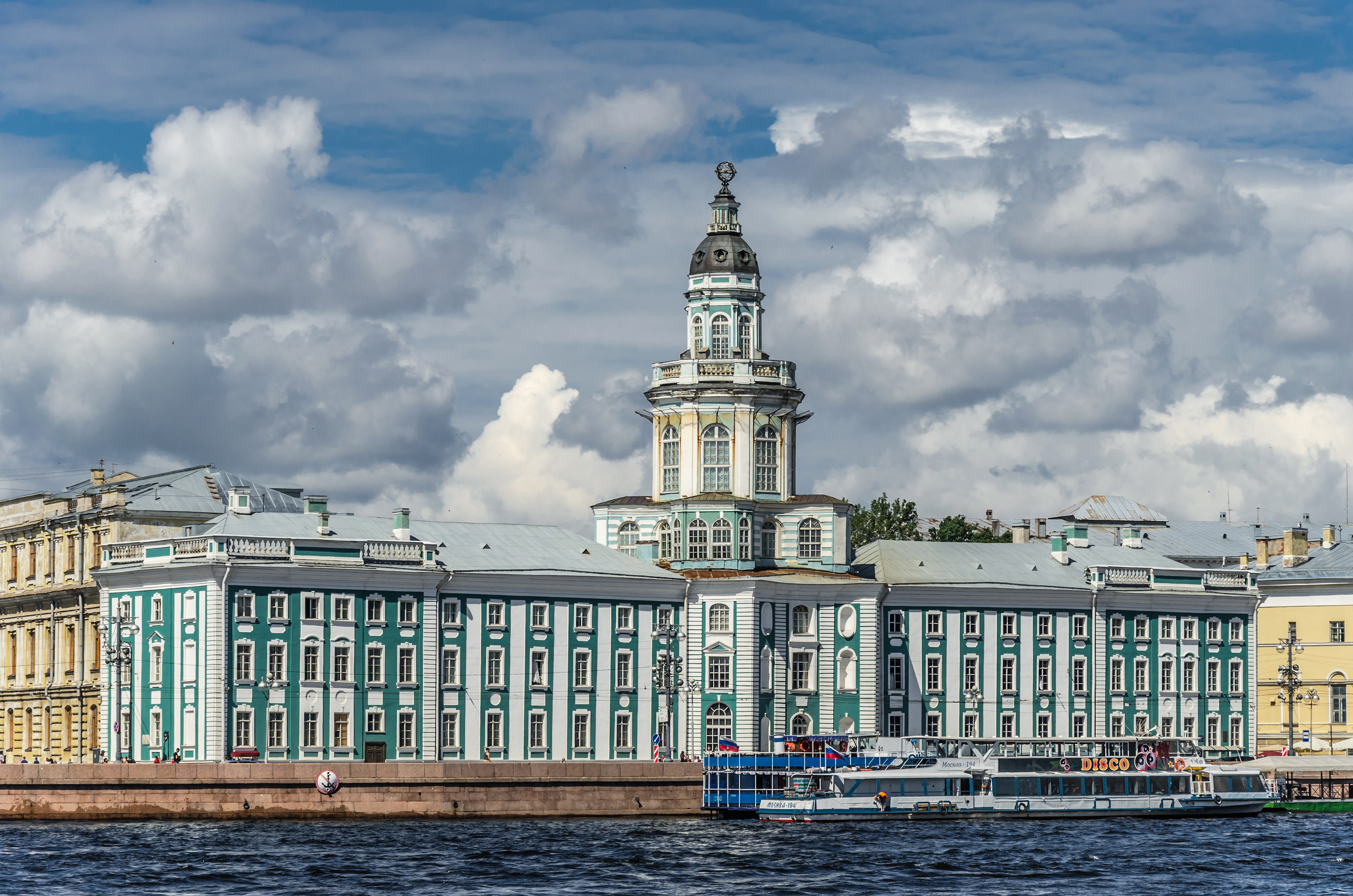
Original headquarters of the Russian Academy of Sciences – the Kunstkamera in Saint Petersburg

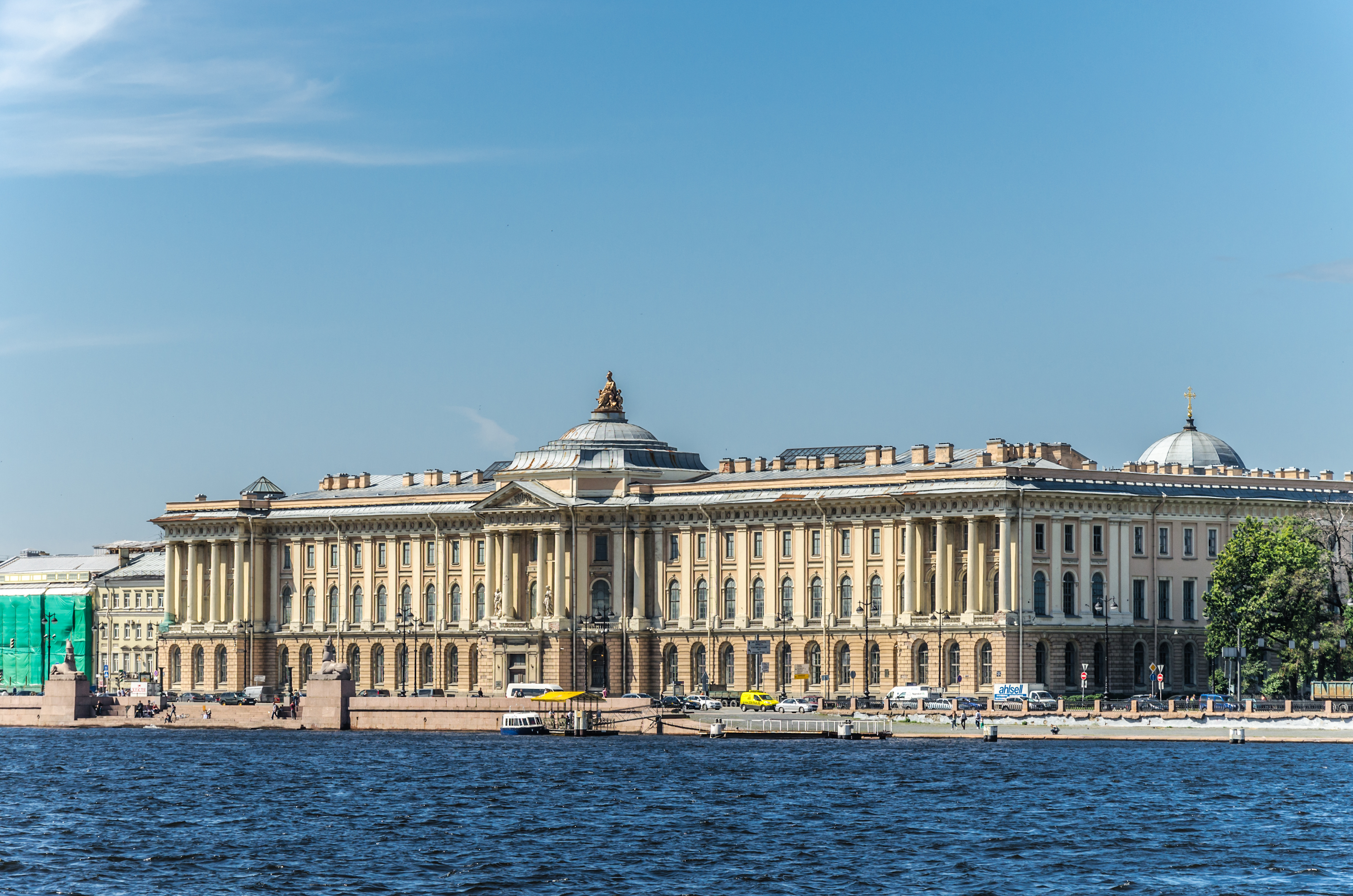
The Imperial Academy of Arts edifice for the academy was built in 1764–89 to a design by Jean-Baptiste Vallin de la Mothe and Alexander F. Kokorinov.

Saint Petersburg has long been a leading center of science and education in Russia and houses the following institutions:

== Universities and tertiary institutions ==
- Saint Petersburg Naval Academy (founded first decade of the 18th century)
- Russian Academy of Sciences (1724)
- Saint Petersburg State University (founded 1724)
- Vaganova Academy of Russian Ballet (1738)
- Imperial Academy of Arts (founded 1757)
- Saint Petersburg Mining Institute (Горный институт) (founded 1773)
- Russian State Pedagogical University (Herzen University) (founded 1797)
- Saint Petersburg Medical-Surgical Academy (founded 1798)
- Saint Petersburg State Transport University (1809)
- Saint Petersburg State University of Water Communications (1809)
- Saint Petersburg Military engineering-technical university (1810)
- Saint Petersburg State Institute of Technology (1828)
- Saint Petersburg State University of Architecture and Civil Engineering (1832)
- Pulkovo Observatory (1839)
- Saint Petersburg Conservatory (1862)
- Alexander Military Law Academy (founded 1867)
- Ivan Pavlov's Medical Academy and research center. (founded 1880s)
- Saint Petersburg Medical and Technical Institute
- Saint Petersburg State Electrotechnical University (1886)
- Saint Petersburg State Medical University (1897)
- Saint Petersburg Polytechnical University (1899)
- State Marine Technical University (Корабелка) (1899)
- Saint Petersburg State Theatre Arts Academy (former Tenishev's College) (1899)
- Saint Petersburg State University of Information Technologies, Mechanics and Optics (1900)
- Saint Petersburg Academy of Pediatrics and Maternity (founded 1900)
- Pushkin House (1905)
- Saint Petersburg State Medical Academy (1907)
- Saint Petersburg State University of Culture and Arts (1918)
- Vavilov Institute of Plant Industry (1921)
- Saint Petersburg State Pediatric Medical Academy (1925)
- Saint Petersburg State University of Economics (1930)
- St. Petersburg State University of Telecommunications (1930)
- Baltic State Technical University ("ВОЕНМЕХ") (1932)
- Saint-Petersburg State University of Aerospace Instrumentation ("ГУАП") (1941)
- Saint Petersburg State University of Civil Aviation (founded 1955)
- St. Petersburg Christian University (1990)
- European University at Saint Petersburg (1994)
- Pushkin Leningrad State University (1992)
- Smolny College (1999)
- Saint Petersburg Academic University (2002)
- St. Petersburg State University of Technology and Design
- St. Petersburg State University of Film and Television
- Saint Petersburg Pharmaceutical Academy
- Saint Petersburg Aerospace University (Mozhaysky University)
- Admiral Makarov Maritime Academy

== Primary and secondary schools ==
International schools serving foreign expatriates:

- Anglo-American School of St. Petersburg
- Deutsche Schule Sankt Petersburg (German school)
- École française André-Malraux (French school)
- International Academy of St. Petersburg, Russia
