= Natalia Bekhtereva =

Russian neuroscientist and psychologist

- Ната́лья Петро́вна Бе́хтерева
- Born: 7 July 1924; Leningrad, USSR
- Died: 22 June 2008 (aged 83); Hamburg, Germany
- Education: First Pavlov State Medical University of St. Peterburg

Natalia Petrovna Bekhtereva (Russian: Ната́лья Петро́вна Бе́хтерева, IPA: [ˈbʲextʲɪrʲɪvə]; July 7, 1924 – June 22, 2008) was a Soviet and Russian neuroscientist and psychologist who developed neurophysiological approaches to psychology, such as measuring the impulse activity of human neurons. She was a participant in the documentaries The Call of the Abyss (Russian: Зов бездны) and Storm of Consciousness (Russian: Штурм сознания), which aroused wide public interest.

== Biography ==
Though the granddaughter of the famous scientist Vladimir Bekhterev, she was brought up with her brother in an orphanage. Despite her impoverished beginnings, she was able to graduate from the First Pavlov State Medical University of St. Petersburg (1941–1947) and the graduate school of the Pavlov Institute of Physiology. Her education came during turbulent times. In the summer of 1941, more than 700 students entered the University but as a result of the Siege of Leningrad only 4 graduates survived, the rest having died from war and famine.

She first worked as a junior research fellow at the Institute of Experimental Medicine, USSR Academy of Medical Sciences (1950–1954) where she obtained her Candidate of Biological Sciences. After working her way up from a senior research fellow to the head of the laboratory and Deputy Director, she worked at the Research Neurosurgical Institute named after Professor Andrey L. Polenov of the USSR Ministry of Health (1954–1962). In 1959 she became a Doctor of Medicine. Since 1962 she was head of the Department of Human Neurophysiology at the Institute of Institute of Experimental Medicine in the USSR Academy of Medical Sciences. From 1970 to 1990 she served as the Deputy Director of Research.

In 1975, she became a professor of the USSR Academy of Medical Sciences (subsequently Russian Academy of Medical Sciences), and in 1981 at the Academy of Sciences of the Soviet Union. In 1990, she was the scientific director of the Center "Brain" of the Academy of Sciences of the Soviet Union and in 1992 she became the head of the scientific group of the neurophysiology of thinking, creativity and consciousness of the Institute for Human Brain of the RAS.

She was Vice President of the International Union of Physiological Sciences (1974–1980) and Vice President of the International Organization for Psychophysiology (1982–1994).

She worked as editor-in-chief of the academic journals Human Physiology (1975–1987) and International Journal of Psychophysiology (1984–1994).

She was Deputy of the Supreme Soviet of the Soviet Union of the 8th convocation (1970–1974) and People's Deputy of the Soviet Union (1989–1991).

=== Rewards and titles ===
- The Order of Lenin (July 6, 1984) – for great merits in the development of medical science, the training of scientific personnel.
- The Order of the Red Banner of Labour (1975).
- The Order of the Badge of Honour (1967).
- The Medal "For Labour Valour" (February 11, 1961) – for great merits in the field of protecting the health of the Soviet people and the development of medical science.
- The Gold medal of the Exhibition of Economic Achievements of the Soviet Union (1967 & 1974).
- Silver medal of the Exhibition of Economic Achievements of the Soviet Union (1976).
- Gold medal named after Vladimir M. Bekhterev – for a series of studies on the neurophysiological foundations of the higher mental functions of the human brain.
- The USSR State Prize 1985 in the field of science and technology (October 31, 1985) – for fundamental research on the physiology of the human brain.
- The Order "For Merit to the Fatherland" III class (July 14, 2004) – for merits in scientific and medical activity and many years of conscientious work.
- The Order "For Merit to the Fatherland" IV class (June 4, 1999) – for his great contribution to the development of domestic science, the training of highly qualified personnel and in connection with the 275th anniversary of the Russian Academy of Sciences.
- The Order of Friendship of Peoples (April 11, 1994) – for great personal contribution to the development of medical science and the training of highly qualified specialists for domestic health care.
- The Wiener Medal in Cybernetics by the American Society for Cybernetics (1972).
- Honorary Member of the Hungarian Society of Electrophysiologists since 1968.
- Honorary Member of the Czechoslovak Neurophysiological and Neurosurgical Societies named after Purkyně since 1989.
- Foreign Member of the Austrian Academy of Sciences since 1974.
- Foreign Member of the Academy of Sciences of Finland since 1990.
- Foreign Member of the American Academy of Medicine and Psychiatry since 1993.
- Full member of the International Academy of Ecology, Human and Nature Safety since 1997.
- Member of the Board of Directors of the International Organization for Psychophysiology since 1998.
- Honorary Doctor of the Saint-Petersburg University of Humanities and Social Sciences (2006).

=== Death ===
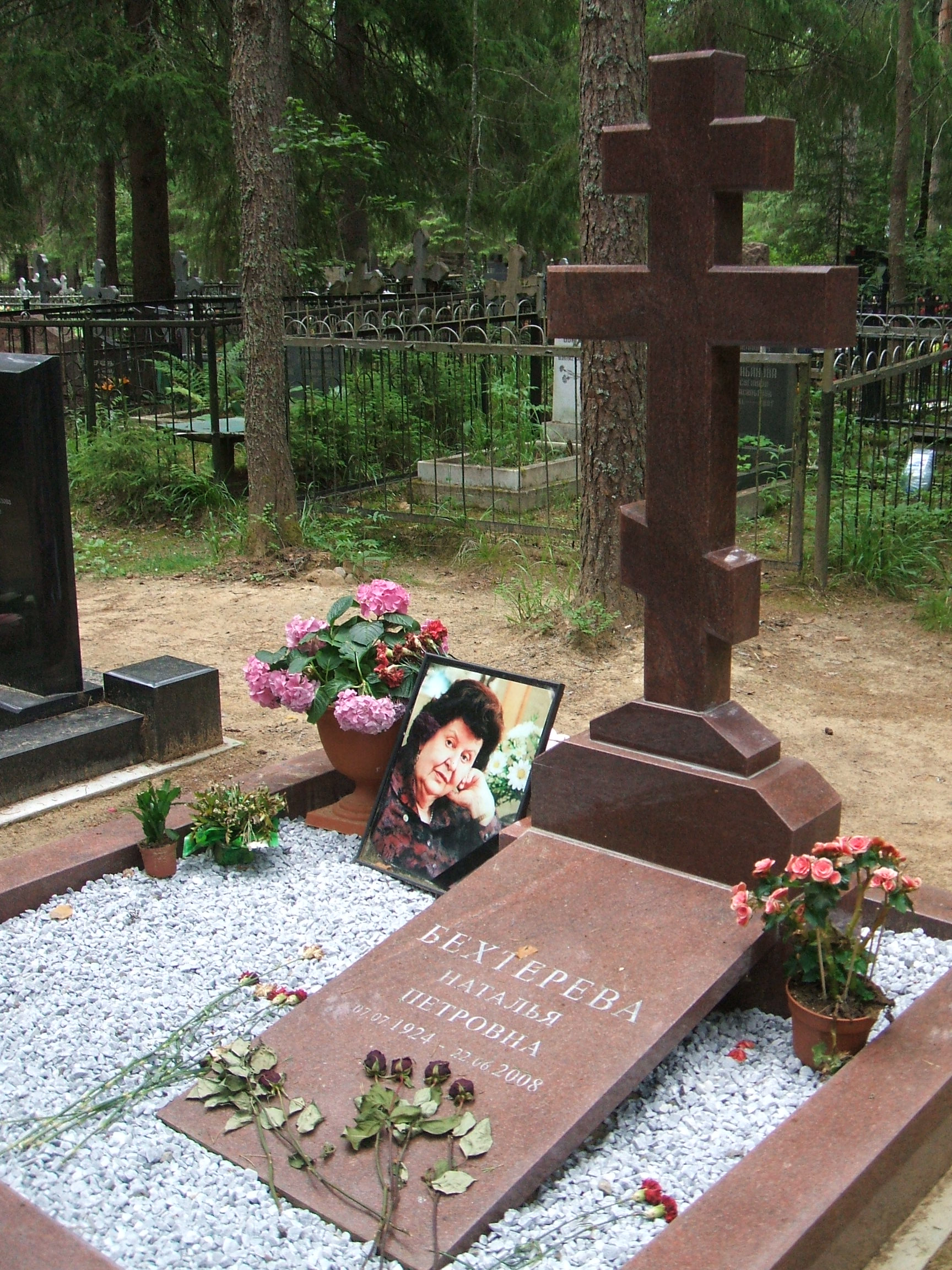
Bekhtereva's grave.

She died in the morning of June 22, 2008 in Hamburg at the St. George's Hospital at 84 after a protracted illness.

== Tribute ==
On July 7, 2020, Google celebrated her 96th birthday with a Google Doodle.

6074 Bechtereva, a minor planet named after Natalia Bekhtereva.

The Bekhtereva Institute for Human Brain of the RAS is named after her.

== Family ==
Her grandfather was Vladimir Bekhterev, the famous psychiatrist, neuropathologist, physiologist, psychologist and founder of reflexology. Her father was Peter Bekhterev, an engineer and inventor and her mother was Zinaïda Bekhtereva, a doctor.

Her first husband was Vsevolod Medvedev, a physiologist and she had a son from her first marriage, Svyatoslav Medvedev, also a physiologist. Her second husband was Ivan Kashtelyan, an economist, with whom she raised a stepson Alexander and a granddaughter Natalia Medvedeva, a psychiatrist.

== Publications ==
Bekhtereva published more than 360 works, some of them in English, including:

- 1962. Biopotentials of Cerebral Hemispheres in Brain Tumors.
- 1978. Neurophysiological Aspects of Human Mental Activity.
- 1981. Psychophysiology Today and Tomorrow. (editor).

=== Documentary films with her participation ===
- Зов бездны (The Call of the Abyss); (in Russian)
- Штурм сознания. Громкое дело (Storm of Consciousness High-profile case). (in Russian)

== See also ==
- Vladimir Bekhterev
