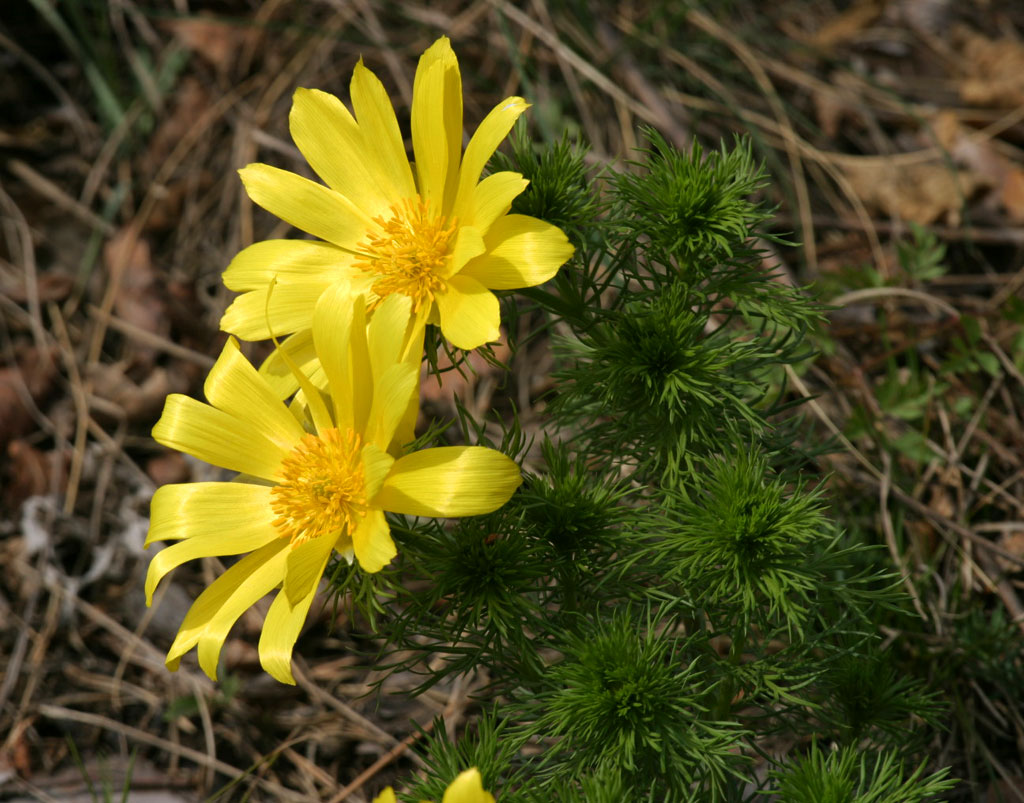

Conservation status
- Least Concern (IUCN 3.1)
- CITES Appendix II

Scientific classification
- Kingdom: Plantae
- Clade: Tracheophytes
- Clade: Angiosperms
- Clade: Eudicots
- Order: Ranunculales
- Family: Ranunculaceae
- Genus: Adonis
- Species: A. vernalis

Binomial name
- Adonis vernalis L.

= Adonis vernalis =

Species of flowering plant in the buttercup family

Adonis vernalis, known variously as yellow pheasant's eye, pheasant's eye, spring pheasant's eye, and false hellebore, is a perennial flowering plant in the buttercup family Ranunculaceae. It is found in dry meadows and steppes in Eurasia. More specifically, this plant grows in a wide range of locations which include open forests, forest clearings, dry meadows, mesic steppe, and mostly calcareous soil. Isolated populations are found from Spain in the west across Central Europe with fine examples in Valais, Switzerland, and southern Europe, reaching southern Sweden in the north and Abruzzo in the south, with its main area of distribution being the Pannonian Basin and the West Siberian Plain. In contrast to most other European Adonis species, the flowers appear in springtime, and are up to 80 mm (3.1 in) in diameter, with up to 20 bright yellow petals. Not only do the flowers begin to grow, but so do the plants aerial organs, from around April to May.

The plant is poisonous, containing cardiostimulant compounds, such as adonidin and aconitic acid. Infusions of the plant are used in the medicine Bekhterev's mixture.

It is often used as an ornamental plant.

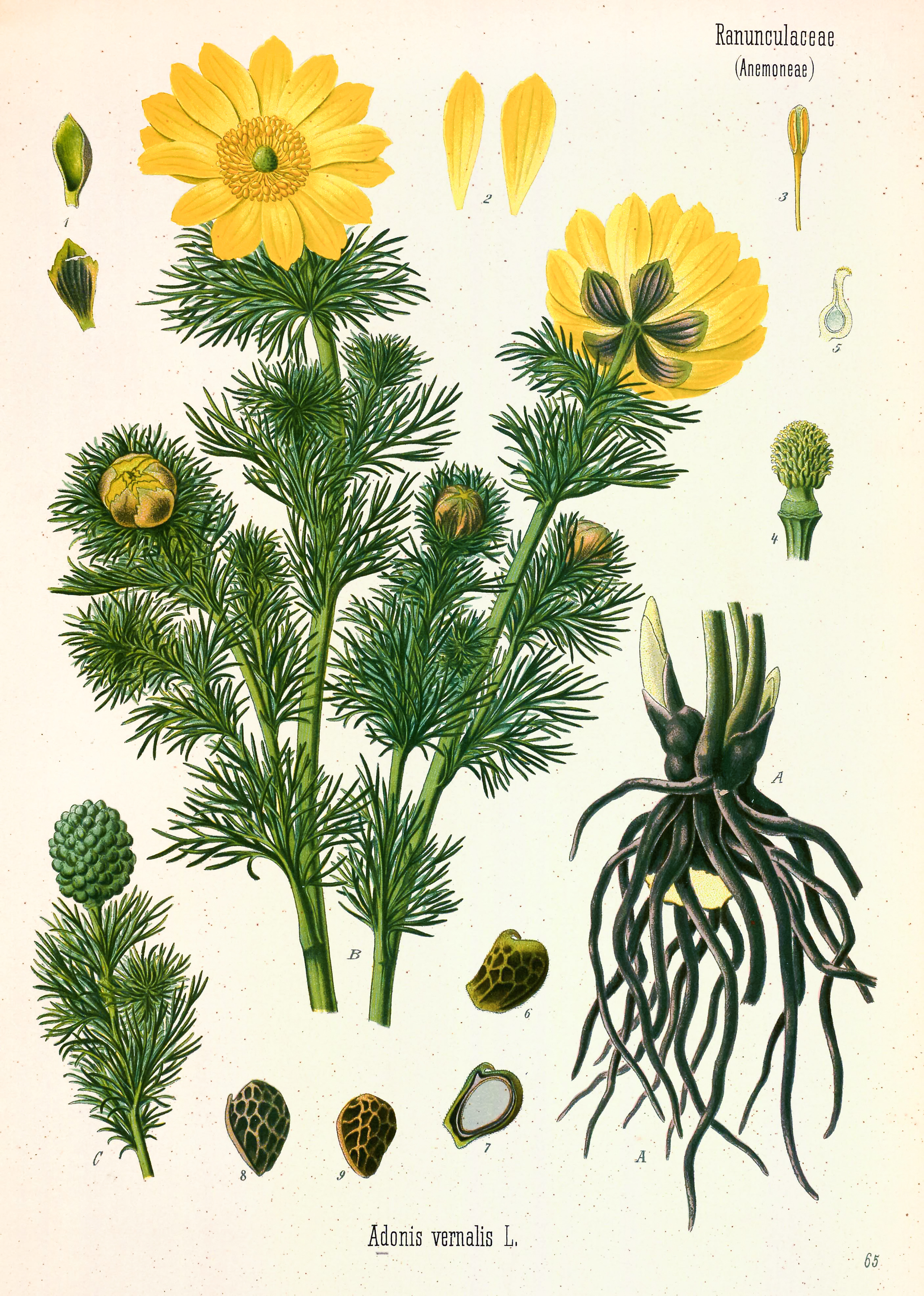
Diagram of Adonis vernalis

== Traditional uses ==
Due to the cardiac-enhancing effects of Adonis species (including Adonis vernalis), this plant has a history of use in European and Chinese folk medicine to treat various health problems. It has been used in the Soviet Union to treat edema or swelling and as an alternative cardiac agent. In 1879, a Russian medical doctor, N. O. Bubnov, first introduced into medicine alcoholic extracts of the plant as a cardiac stimulant. In 1898, a mixture of the plant extracts with sodium bromide or codeine was suggested (by Vladimir Bekhterev) to treat heart diseases, panic disorder, dystonia and mild forms of epilepsy. Aqueous infusions of the aerial parts of the plant have been traditionally used in Siberia against edema, cardiac edema and several other issues that are heart related, kidney diseases, and even malaria. The biological activity of this extract was defined as 50–66 frog units (amount or liquid of substance that causes the arrest of the heart of a frog) and 6.3–8.0 cat units (amount or liquid of substance that causes the arrest of the heart of a cat) and large enough doses can be toxic.

== Phytochemicals ==
There are many phytochemicals that come from the plant Adonis vernalis including cardiac glycosides such as cymarin and digitoxigenin and flavones including orientin, luteolin, and vitexin.

Floral diagram of Adonis vernalis.

== Medicinal uses ==
Adonis vernalis contains cardiac glycosides that improve the cardiac efficiency by increasing its output and reducing heart rate. These glycosides also have a sedative effect and are often prescribed to patients whose hearts are beating irregularly or at an increased rate. Tinctures of Adonis vernalis are also used by homeopathic physicians in patients that are suffering from congestive cardiac failure and its action is very similar to digitalis (another drug that stimulates the heart muscle). Aqueous extracts of Adonis vernalis were found to have cardiac stimulant effects on isolated heart preparations and it also showed that production of excessive and high potassium concentrations protects against heart failure. The plant also contains some flavones with pharmacological activities, including antioxidant, antimicrobial, anti-inflammatory, neuro and cardioprotective, and anti-allergic properties.

== See also ==
- List of poisonous plants
