= Alfons Maria Jakob =

German neurologist (1884–1931)

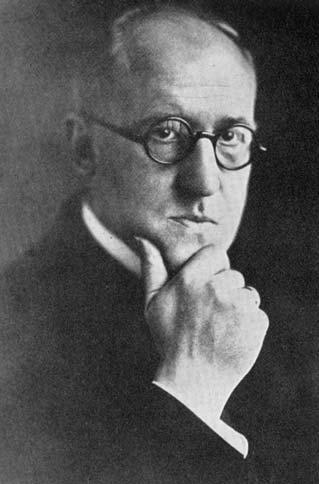
- Born: 2 July 1884; Aschaffenburg, Kingdom of Bavaria, German Empire
- Died: 17 October 1931 (aged 47); Hamburg, Weimar Republic
- Known for: Neuropathology
- Scientific career
- Fields: Neurology

Alfons Maria Jakob (2 July 1884 – 17 October 1931) was a German neurologist who worked in the field of neuropathology.

He was born on 2 July 1884 in Aschaffenburg, Bavaria and educated in medicine at the Ludwig-Maximilians-Universität München, the Friedrich Wilhelm University of Berlin, and the University of Strasbourg, where he received his doctorate in 1908. During the following year, he began clinical work under the psychiatrist Emil Kraepelin and did laboratory work with Franz Nissl and Alois Alzheimer at the Ludwig-Maximilians-Universität München.

In 1911, by way of an invitation from Wilhelm Weygandt, he relocated to Hamburg, where he worked with Theodor Kaes and eventually became head of the laboratory of anatomical pathology at the psychiatric State Hospital Hamburg-Friedrichsberg. Following the death of Kaes in 1913, Jakob succeeded him as prosector. During World War I he served as an army physician in Belgium, and afterwards returned to Hamburg. In 1919, he obtained his habilitation for neurology and in 1924 became a professor of neurology. Under Jakob's guidance the department grew rapidly. He made significant contributions to knowledge on concussion and secondary nerve degeneration and became a doyen of neuropathology.

Jakob was the author of five monographs and nearly 80 scientific papers. His neuropathological research contributed greatly to the delineation of several diseases, including multiple sclerosis and Friedreich's ataxia. He first recognised and described Alper's disease and Creutzfeldt–Jakob disease (named along with Munich neuropathologist Hans Gerhard Creutzfeldt). He gained experience in neurosyphilis, having a 200-bed ward devoted entirely to that disorder. Jakob made a lecture tour of the United States (1924) and South America (1928), of which, he wrote a paper on the neuropathology of yellow fever.

He suffered from chronic osteomyelitis for the last seven years of his life. This eventually caused a retroperitoneal abscess and paralytic ileus from which he died following operation on 17 October 1931.

== Associated eponym ==
- Creutzfeldt–Jakob disease: A very rare and incurable degenerative neurological disease. It is the most common form of transmissible spongiform encephalopathies caused by prions. Eponym introduced by Walther Spielmeyer in 1922.

== Bibliography ==
- Die extrapyramidalen Erkrankungen. In: Monographien aus dem Gesamtgebiete der Neurologie und Psychiatry, Berlin, 1923
- Normale und pathologische Anatomie und Histologie des Grosshirns. Separate printing of Handbuch der Psychiatry. Leipzig, 1927–1928
- Das Kleinhirn. In: Handbuch der mikroskopischen Anatomie, Berlin, 1928
- Die Syphilis des Gehirns und seiner Häute. In: Oswald Bumke (edit.): Handbuch der Geisteskrankheiten, Berlin, 1930.
