= Theodor Kaes =

German neurologist (1852–1913)

Theodor Joseph Martin Kaes
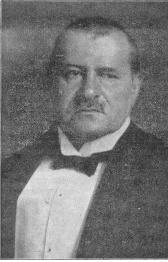
- Born: November 7, 1852; Amberg, Germany
- Died: December 22, 1913 (aged 61)
- Occupation: Neurologist

Theodor Joseph Martin Kaes (7 November 1852 – 22 December 1913) was a German neurologist who was a native of Amberg.

== Career ==
He practiced medicine at the Schön Klinik Hamburg Eilbek (Staatskrankenanstalt Friedrichsberg) in Hamburg, where he was first prosector and head of the brain anatomy laboratory from 1899 until 1913. After his death, he was succeeded at Friedrichsberg by Alfons Maria Jakob (1884–1931).

Theodor Kaes was a pioneer in myeloarchitectonics, and is remembered for his morphological and myeloarchitectural research of the cerebral cortex, including the creation of cortical maps based on its fiber architecture. His name is lent to the eponymous "line of Kaes", which is a thin band of myelinated fibers located between the external granular layer and the external pyramidal layer of the cerebral cortex. This structure is sometimes called the "stria of molecular layer TA", or the "Kaes-Bekhterev layer", named in conjunction with Russian neurophysiologist Vladimir Bekhterev (1857–1927).

His principle written work was Die Großhirnrinde des Menschen in ihren Maßen und in ihrem Fasergehalt – Ein gehirnanatomischer Atlas (The cerebral cortex of humans in their dimensions and their fiber content. An anatomical brain atlas), 1907.
