= Bekhterev Review of Psychiatry and Medical Psychology =

Bekhterev Review of Psychiatry and Medical Psychology Обозрение психиатрии и медицинской психологии им. В.М.Бехтерева
- Discipline: Psychiatry
- Language: Russian
- Edited by: Yury Popov

Publication details
- History: 1896–present
- Publisher: Media Medica on behalf of the Bekhterev Psychoneurological Research Institute in St. Petersburg (Russian Federation)
- Frequency: Quarterly
- Open access: yes

Standard abbreviations
- ISO 4: Bekhterev Rev. Psychiatry Med. Psychol.

Indexing
- ISSN: 0762-7475

Links
- Journal homepage; Current issue; Online access

The Bekhterev Review of Psychiatry and Medical Psychology (Russian: Обозрение психиатрии и медицинской психологии им. В.М.Бехтерева) is a Russian peer-reviewed medical journal containing original research, systematic reviews, etc. relating to the areas of psychiatry, medical psychology and psychotherapy.

== History ==
In 1896 Vladimir Bekhterev, the great Russian neuropathologist, created a new Russian journal under the title Overview of Psychiatry and Medical Psychology (Russian: Обозрение психиатрии и медицинской психологии). It was named after him in 1927. But after he had died, the journal ceased publication. In 1990, the USSR State Committee for Publishing made a resolution to reestablish the journal. Later on, the Higher Attestation Commission of the Ministry of Education and Science of the Russian Federation included the Bekhterev Review of Psychiatry and Medical Psychology in the list of leading journals and publications. Many issues are now available online through the website of Media Medica (consilium-medicum.com), the full-length papers being provided with summaries in both Russian and English.

The current editor-in-chief is Yury Popov, but submitted articles are arranged in three sections with particular editors according to the subject-matter of a material:

- “Medical psychology,” ed. by Ludvig Wasserman;
- “Psychiatry,” ed. by Alexander Kotsubinsky;
- “Psychotherapy and prevention”, ed. by Boris Karvasarsky (ru), chief psychotherapist of the Ministry of Health and Social Development of the Russian Federation

The chairman of the editorial board is Nikolay G. Neznanov, Director of the Bekhterev Research Institute and President of the World Association for Dynamic Psychiatry (WADP). The coordinating editor is Victor Makarov, one of the former Presidents of the European Association for Psychotherapy. The journal publishes articles in the following categories:

- Problem-solving articles
- Research reviews
- Investigations
- Guidelines for the practitioner
- Talking shop
- Psychiatric newspaper

== See also ==
- List of psychiatry journals
