= Christian Schools International =

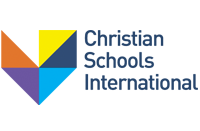
- Type: Non-governmental organization
- Purpose: Educational accreditation
- Location: Grand Rapids, MI
- Website: csionline.org

Christian Schools International (CSI) is a nonprofit education organization and was established in 1920. Christian Schools International provides services to Christian schools in accreditation, curriculum and instruction, employee benefits (insurance and retirement plans), and leadership development. They also have a published Bible curriculum for schools seeking Bible-based textbooks for their classrooms.

Christian Schools International's mission is to advance education and to support schools in their task of teaching students to know God and his world and to glorify him through obedient service.

The organization includes nearly 500 Christian schools in the United States, Canada, and other countries, which employ approximately 10,000 teachers and enroll 100,000 students.
