= Saint Petersburg State Pediatric Medical University =

University in Saint Petersburg, Russia

Coordinates: 59.977447°N 30.340325°E

- Санкт-Петербургский Государственный Педиатрический Медицинский Университет
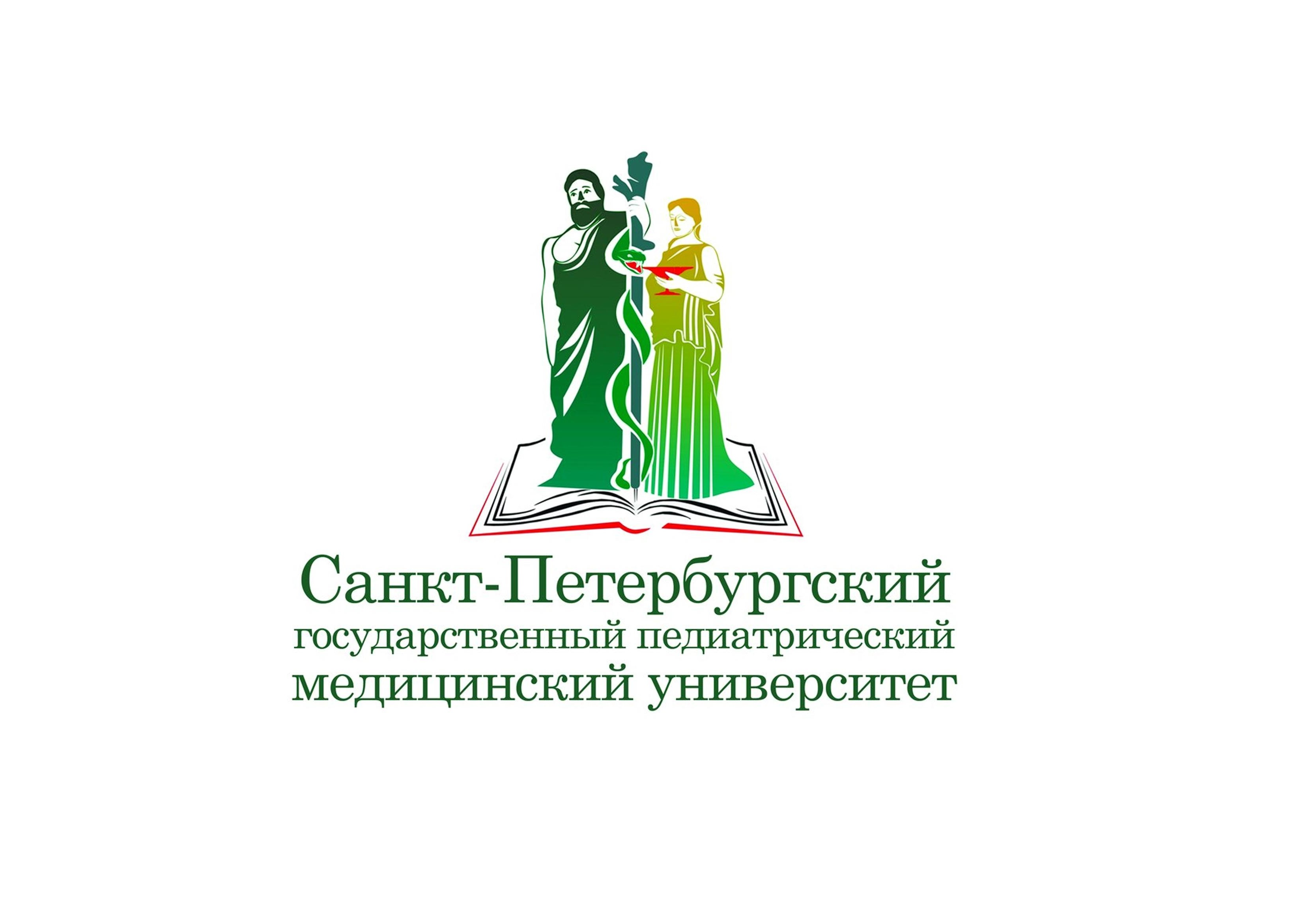
- Former names: Leningrad Pediatric Medical Institute (LPMI), St. Petersburg State Pediatric Medical Institute, St. Petersburg State Pediatric Medical Academy (SPbSPMA)
- Type: Medical university
- Established: 1925
- Rector: Dmirty Olegovich Ivanov
- Students: 5000
- Location: Saint Petersburg, Russia
- Website: www.gpmu.org

Saint Petersburg State Pediatric Medical University (SPbSPMU) is a medical university located in St. Petersburg, Russia. It is the oldest pediatric higher education institution in the world.

SPbSPMU has a state license and accreditation to provide training in English language, medicine according to the state standards.

In June 2005, under the support of Government of Russia, State Duma, Federation Council of Russia, Russian Rector's Union, the prize-winners of Golden Medal: European Quality competition in the nomination of Top 100 of Russian Universities were awarded. Saint Petersburg State Pediatric Medical Academy was honored with a golden medal. Rector of the academy Vladimir Levanovich was named The Best Rector of The Year 2004.

There are four programs in the University, leading to the Doctor of Medicine (MD) with a specialization in Pediatrics, Doctor of Medicine (MD), Doctor of Dental Medicine (DDM), and Master in Clinical Psychology degrees. Postgraduate training, providing the opportunity to get a PhD, is also available.

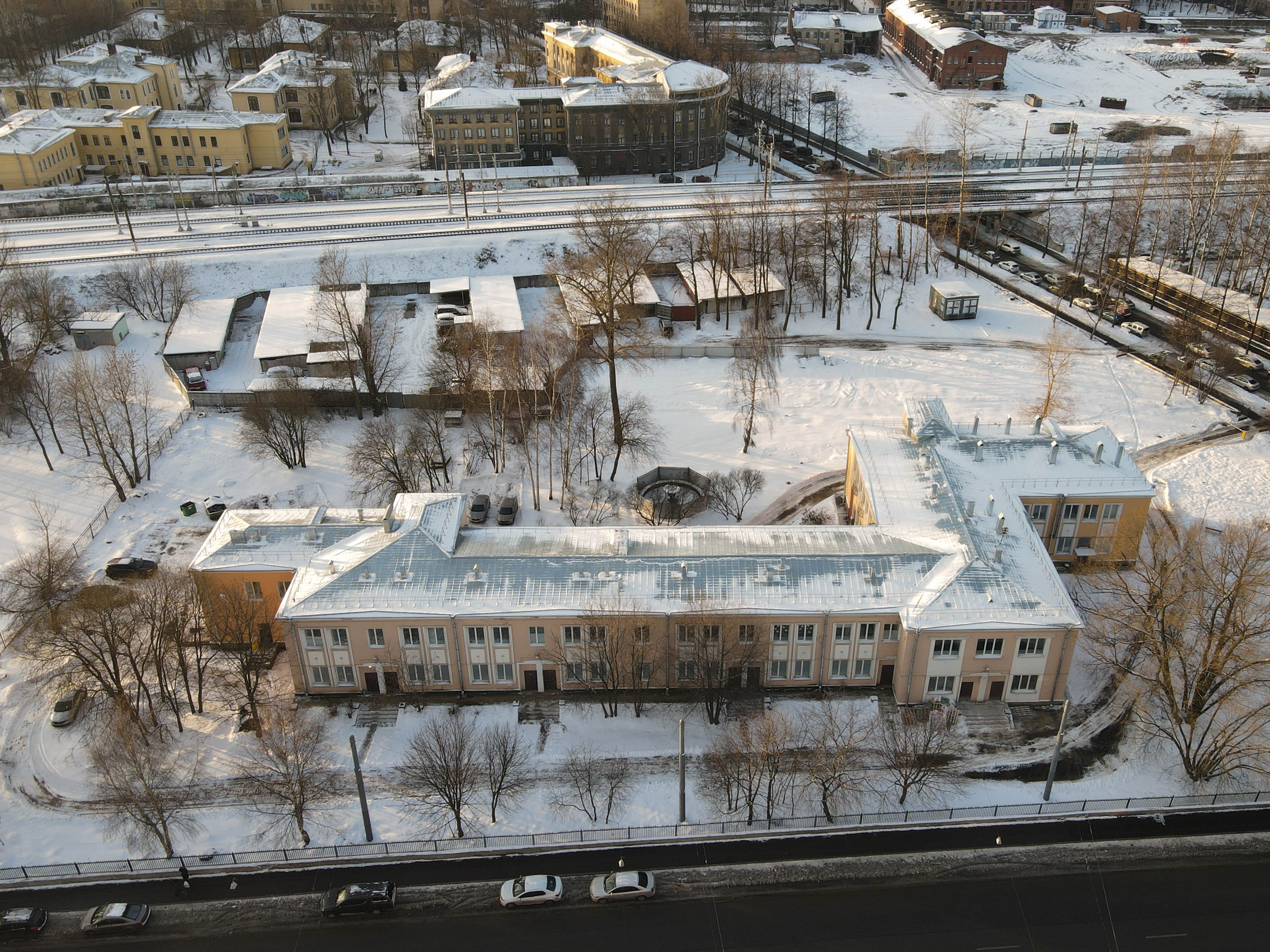

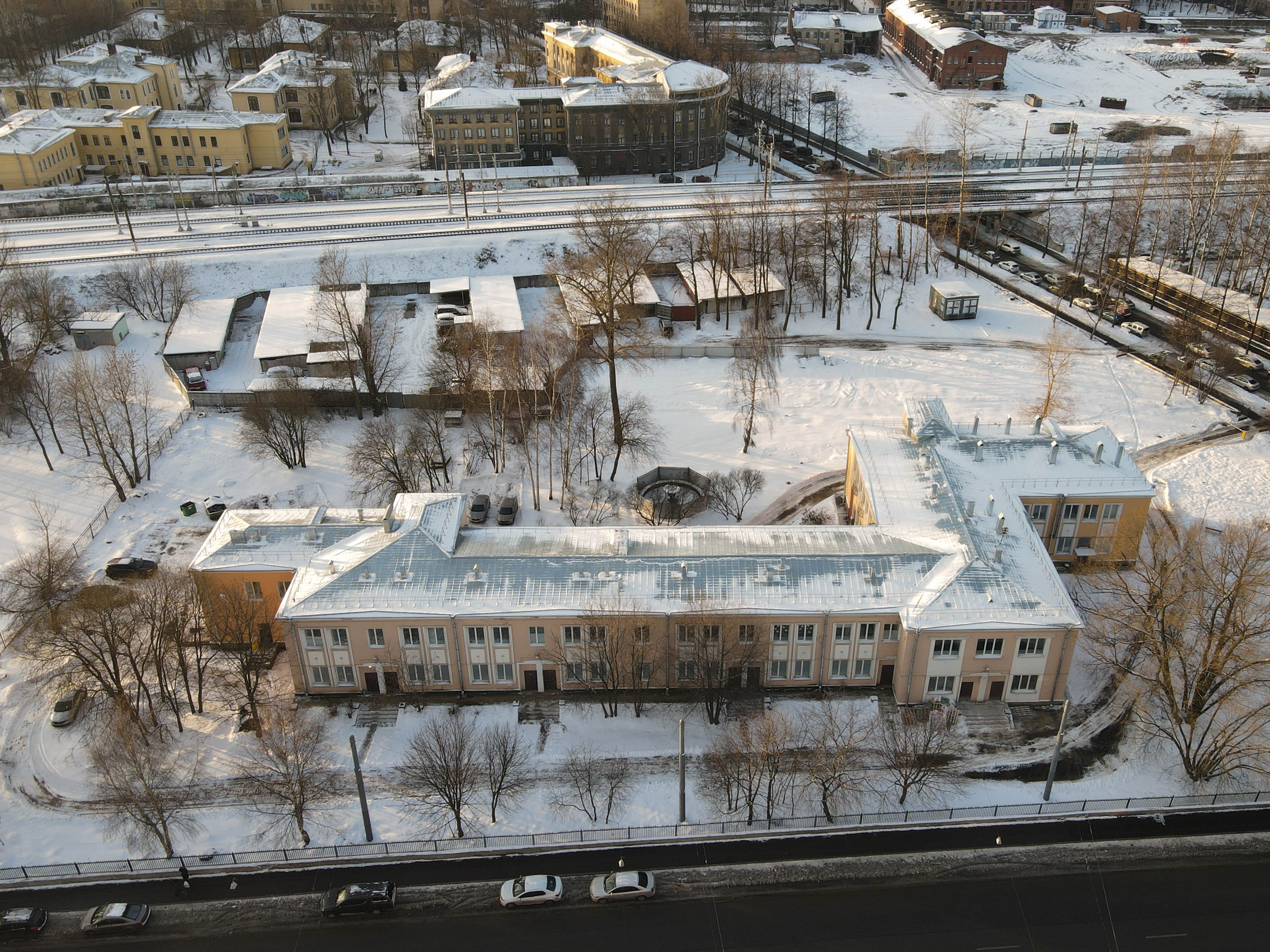

== History ==
St. Petersburg State Pediatric Medical University (SPbSPMU), formerly known as Leningrad Pediatric Medical Institute (LPMI) is the oldest independent pediatric university in the world. It was founded in 1925 as the Institute for Protection of Maternity and Infancy. The main building of University was settled on the territory of City Children's Hospital, which had been founded in 1905. The Children's Hospital was built as a series of separated pavilions to prevent spreading of infectious diseases. There were 650 beds in the hospital which had a staff consisting of 28 physicians, 2 paramedics, 56 sisters of mercy, 232 nurses and a number of other staff.

During the period of Russian Civil War(1918–1920) the hospital was neglected, but the large number of orphaned children after the war led authorities to provide more funding, and on January 7, 1925, the Scientific-Practical Institute of Maternity and Infancy Protection, named after Clara Zetkin, opened. The structure of the institute was remodeled and included 11 clinical departments, a baby house, an infant house, the department to qualify children conditions, 3 clinics with up to 500 beds in each of them, an outpatient clinic, a children consulting center, and milk stations. From the year of 1925 until 1949, the institute was headed by Yulia Aronovna Mendeleeva.

In 1928, the scientific work began in the institute. Later, the institute became the Scientific Research Institute of Maternity and Infancy Protection and kept this status till 1932. The newly created departments of Physiology, Social Hygiene of Woman and Child, Hygiene and Nutrition Science Early Ages, Pathology of Children, Roentgenology, Child Phthisiatry, Acute Child Infections got involved in teaching and research activities.

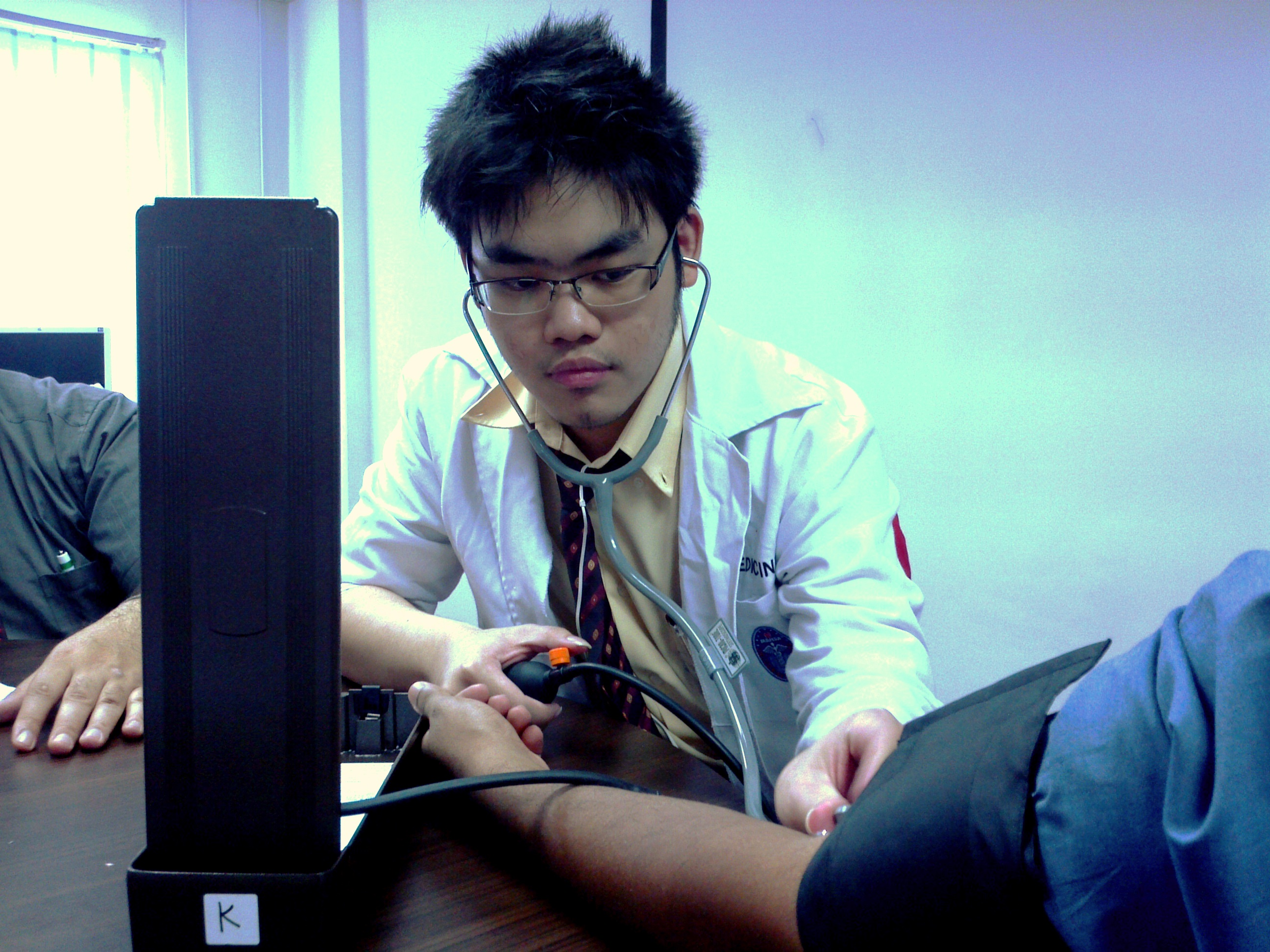

In 1932 the institute was transformed into the higher medical educational institution- "the clinic-med school". The country struggled with getting enough qualified medical specialists, and the child mortality still remained high. The government had to expand a net of clinical and preventive institutions and to establish health care in houses and correctional institutions for orphans. Soon, the whole department of maternity and infancy protection with professors and students of the First Leningrad Medical Institute was transferred to the Pediatric Institute. 82 students were registered for the fall semester of their first year. In 1935 "the clinic-med school" was reorganized into Leningrad Pediatric Medical Institute (LPMI), the first in the world specialized medical school for pediatricians training. There was the first graduate class of 51 child doctors in 1936. Upon the beginning of WWII, the institute trained 530 and improved training of 300 physicians. There were somatic, surgical, infectious, neurological, tuberculosis, venereal, obstetric, gynecological departments in the institute. Special attention was paid to prevention of infectious diseases. The quantity of beds in the hospital approached 1215 in 1940.

Throughout all years of World War II, the institute continued clinical, research, educational and organizational work. The majority of faculty and clinical staff remained in Leningrad, surrounded by German troops. On the German military maps, the pediatric institute had a specific number of 708 and had to be vanished. On the territory of institute, surgical and infectious hospitals were opened to treat soldiers and citizens. The Siege of Leningrad captured more than 400 thousands of children, interrupting their evacuation.

In the 50s, the institute increased quantity of applicants up to 600. According to the order of Ministry of Healthcare, the institute became Saint-Petersburg Pediatric Medical Institute in 1992 and then received a status of academy in 1994. In 2012 received a status of university. Currently, the University has 70 departments. To the year of 2000, more than 25000 physicians graduated from SpbSPMU, including 2000 physicians from foreign countries. The training of foreign students started in 1949.

There are several scientific schools in the University, and they continue to develop:

- Pathology of young children of M.S.Maslov
- Pediatrics of A.F.Tur
- Infectious Diseases of M.G.Danilevich
- Cardiorheumatology of A.B.Volovik
- Phthisiopulmonology of P.S.Medovikov
- Pediatric Surgery of G.A.Bayirov
- Pediatric Nephrology of A.V.Papayan
- Pediatric Gynecology of N.V.Kobozev
- Social Pediatrics of N.G.Veselov

== List of rectors ==
In the postwar years:

1950-1960 Prof. Nina Timofeevna Shutova (проф. Нина Тимофеевна Шутова)
1960-1965 Associate Professor E.P.Semenova (доцент Е. П. Семёнова)
1965-1975 Prof. Gally Abgarovna Kaisar'iants (проф. Галия Абгаровна Кайсарьянц)
1975 -1984 Prof. Galina Alexandrovna Timofeeva (проф. Галина Александровна Тимофеева)
1984-1991 Prof. Vyacheslav Petrovitch Alferov (проф. Вячеслав Петрович Алфёров)
1991-1999 Prof. Mikhail Vasilevitch Nezhentsev (проф. Михаил Васильевич Неженцев)
1999 Prof. Valentina Ivanovna Guzeva (проф. Валентина Ивановна Гузева)
1999–2015 Prof. Vladimir Victorovitch Levanovich (проф. Владимир Викторович Леванович)
since 2015 Prof. Dmitry Olegovich Ivanov (проф. Дмитрий Олегович Иванов)

== Faculties ==
Currently, the University has several faculties:

- The Faculty of Pediatrics
- The Faculty of General Medicine
- The Faculty of Clinical Psychology
- The Faculty of Dentistry
- The Faculty of Post Graduate & Additional Professional Education

== Major teaching affiliates ==
- St. Petersburg Mariinsky Hospital
- Central Medical Sanitary Unit #122
- Children City Hospital #1
- Children City Hospital #5
- Children Hospital of SpbSPMU
- Children District Clinical Hospital
- City Infectious Hospital of Botkin #30

== Teaching affiliates ==
- City Hospitals ##2,9,15,38,46
- Psychiatric Hospital of Skvortcov-Stepanov #3
- Psychiatric Hospital #6
- Children Hospital of St. Maria Magdalena #2
- Children Hospital of Rauhfuss #19
- Children Hospital of St. Olga #4
- Children Hospital #22
- N.N.Petrov Research Institute of Oncology
- Research Institute of Children Infections
- Research Institute of Human Brain
- Children Outpatient Clinics ##10,17,20,41,44,109
- City Oncology Center
- Medico-Genetic Diagnostic Center
- Consultative-Diagnostic Center
- Medical Sanitary Unit #7
- Medical Sanitary Unit #144
- Children Tuberculosis Sanatorium in Pushkin City
- Maternity hospitals ##1,9,15,16,18

== Education ==
Education is conducted in Russian for Russian students and English for foreign students. SPbSPMU is listed in the World Directory of Medical Schools (joint database of FAIMER’s International Medical Education Directory (IMED) and WFME’s Avicenna Directory).

The education is provided by the Faculty of Pediatrics at the Faculty of Medicine for 6 years. Medical students spend the first three years of training studying science, biomedical, liberal, and disease-preventive disciplines. The educational program includes all subjects required by any Russian medical school.

SPbSPMU trains more than 4000 students. University graduates receive comprehensive health education to practice Medicine as general practitioners, medical specialists, including pediatricians, and medical researchers. Approximately 60% of graduates work in various areas of Pediatrics, the remaining 40% work in "adult" medicine or in experimental medical research. The University conducts extensive research work.

== See also ==
- List of universities in Russia
- Education in Russia
- List of higher education and academic institutions in Saint Petersburg
