= Bekhterev–Jacobsohn reflex =

- Differential diagnosis: Pyramidal tract lesions

The Bekhterev–Jacobsohn reflex, or Jacobsohn's finger flexion sign, is a clinical sign found in patients with pyramidal tract lesions of the upper limb. In this condition, stroking the dorsum of the forearm, in the area of the distal radius, with the arm supine causes abduction of the hand and flexion of the fingers.

It is analogous to the Bekhterev–Mendel reflex in the lower limb.

The reflex is named after Vladimir Bekhterev and Louis Jacobsohn-Lask.
