= International Academy of St. Petersburg, Russia =

International Academy of St. Petersburg Russia
- St. Petersburg; Russia

Information
- Type: Private Elementary, Middle, and High School
- Motto: Building Bridges for Cross-Cultural Kids.
- Established: 1993
- Grades: K–12
- Colors: Red and white
- Mascot: Guardians
- Yearbook: IA Yearbook
- Website: www.myiasp.com

The International Academy of St. Petersburg Russia is an international school located in St. Petersburg, Russia. Its curriculum and structure is based on the international standards and is directed towards students who plan to attend a college/university in the U.S., Europe, and Asia. For this reason all of its classes are conducted in English and the school confers an internationally recognized diploma. IA is accredited through the Association of Christian Schools International (ACSI) and Middle States Association.

== History and Campus ==
International Academy began in 1993 as a school for the expatriate community in St. Petersburg, Russia.

== Activities ==
Depending on the interests of staff and parent volunteers, activities vary year to year.

== See also ==
- List of higher education and academic institutions in Saint Petersburg
