= Bekhterev's mixture =

Bekhterev's mixture (Russian: Микстура Бехтерева, MixturaBechtereva) is a medicine with a sedative effect, affecting the central nervous system. The mixture was proposed by Russian neurologist Vladimir Bekhterev as a treatment for mild forms of epilepsy and heart disease in 1898. It was subsequently named after him. One of the oldest and most popular medicines of its type, it is used to treat light forms of heart failure, panic disorder, and dystonia. The medicine is known to be well tolerated, with no contra-indications, except bromine sensitivity (may cause rashes).

The formula contains infusion of Adonis vernalis (6 parts in 180), sodium bromide (6g) and codeine phosphate (0.2g).
