= Bekhterev Psychoneurological Institute =

Russian scientific institution

The St. Petersburg Bekhterev Psychoneurological Research Institute (Russian: Санкт-Петербургский научно-исследовательский психоневрологический институт им. В. М. Бехтерева, НИИ им. В. М. Бехтерева) is a postgraduate education center and the oldest Russian scientific institution aimed at performing studies in the fields of neurology, psychiatry, psychology, and contiguous disciplines. The institute was established by Vladimir Bekhterev in 1907 with official support from Emperor Nicholas II and Russian Prime Minister P. A. Stolypin. Having founded the institute, V. M. Bekhterev became its first director.

The official publication of the institute is the Bekhterev Review of Psychiatry and Medical Psychology (Russian: Обозрение психиатрии и медицинской психологии им. В. М. Бехтерева).

== History ==
The Psychoneurological Institute (as it was originally called) was founded in 1907 by the domestic scientist Vladimir Mikhailovich Bekhterev as a research and higher education institution. Bekhterev became the first head of this type of scientific and educational institution.

The Psychoneurological Institute has a general availability of educational courses for people of different genders and religions, as well as the program announced by V. M. Bekhterev. According to the charter, the goal of the institute was to develop and disseminate knowledge in the fields of psychology and neuroscience, as well as related sciences. Courses in psychology, anatomy, philosophy, history, history of philosophy and psychology, history of culture and art, etc. were taught here.

In 1908, 421 students were admitted to the first course, including 313 females. The opening took place on February 15, 1908. The second reception took place in September of the same year, 1908, when another 479 people were admitted. By 1915, the number of students had reached 7,000.

The first two years, students studied at the Main Faculty, where they received a philosophical education to understand the mutual connections and dependencies between individual scientific disciplines. Afterwards they continued their education at the pedagogical, legal, and medical faculties (since 1911), and since 1915 at the veterinary faculties and chemical-pharmaceutical departments.

This was facilitated by the opening of the verbal history and natural history departments. Of the Russian historians who taught here, in particular Professor N.I. Kareev (1850–1931), who did a lot in organizing the teaching of historical disciplines at the institute, he also attracted a number of specialists here. In the institute's lecture schedule for the 1915–1916 academic year, among the historian teachers of the verbal history department are B. L. Bogaevsky (history of Greece), I. D. Andreev (history of Byzantium and history of the Church), N. P. Ottokar (middle history), P. V. Bezobrazov (history of the South Slavs), I. V. Luchitsky (new history), G. V. Vernadsky (Russian history), M. A. Ostrovskaya (Russian history), and M. D. Priselkov (Russian story). Also among the subjects of the verbal history faculty are general psychopathology (P. Ya. Rosenbakh), history of pedagogical teachings, general pedagogy (V. V. Uspensky), methods of teaching history (M. D. Priselkov), and history of ancient philosophy (D. P. Mirtov). V. A. Butenko taught general history to first-year students of the main faculty (Tenishevsky Hall, Mokhovaya, 33), taught a course of new history to senior students of the Faculty of Literary History and taught seminaries on modern history (Gurevich Gymnasium, Ligovka, 1). In 1915, administrative concerns were added to the teaching load of V. A. Butenko – who acted as dean of the main department.

A dispute arose over the status of the department. According to the commission of the Ministry of Public Education (privy councilors P. A. Nekrasov and A. A. Inostrantsev, trustee of the Petrograd educational district N. K. Kulchitsky), the main department was not a faculty, but a common step to various faculties. The need for this level was explained by the fact that general secondary education in Russia was not consistent with the requirements of higher education. Therefore, courses at the Psychoneurological Institute sought to fill this gap. Representatives of the institute, Academician V. M. Bekhterev and Professor A. S. Ginzberg, opposed the recognition of the basic faculty as a preparatory stage for higher education. “This,” the scientists insisted, “is a faculty with a complete cycle of basic departments of the most important scientific disciplines. The main faculty can be interpreted as the first years of university. The nature of teaching at the main faculty is purely university.” The main idea of the institute was to restore the old idea of universities, which has been lost in the modern structure of universities that train specialized specialists. When creating the main faculty, the organizers of the institute were convinced that “for a physician, a historian, and a natural scientist, a philosophical education is necessary for his future scientific and practical activities, clarifying the mutual connection and dependence between individual scientific disciplines.” Meanwhile, the commission found it expedient to assign the name of the main department to the faculty, “since in terms of purpose and organization it did not correspond to the content of the concept of faculty.” By 1916, the structure of the Psychoneurological Institute included 4 faculties (medical, legal, verbal history and natural history) and 3 departments (main, pedagogical, chemical and pharmaceutical). The most numerous was the medical faculty.

In 1916, after an inspection by the Ministry of Public Education, courses at the Psychoneurological Institute received the status of a “Private Petrograd University” with the rights of higher government educational institutions. V. M. Bekhterev was again elected president of the university. The election of deans and secretaries of departments and faculties also took place: Professor V. A. Butenko (main department), professor Sor V. A. Wagner (pedagogical), Professor A. S. Ginzberg (chemical-pharmaceutical), Academician V. M. Bekhterev (medical faculty), Professor N. I. Kareev (verbal-historical), Professor D. N. Zeiliger (natural history), and Professor P. I. Lyublinsky (legal). The number of students at the Private University included persons of both sexes who had a matriculation certificate from the gymnasiums of the Ministry of Public Education or certificates of completion from other general educational institutions.

In 1918, the university received the status of the Second Petrograd University, and in 1919, during the reorganization, the law and pedagogical faculties were transferred to the First Petrograd University; the medical faculty was transformed into the State Institute of Medical Knowledge; the chemical-pharmaceutical department into the chemical-pharmaceutical institute, and the veterinary faculty at the Veterinary and Zootechnical Institute.

The name of its founder was given to the university in 1925.

During World War II (1941–1945), an evacuation hospital operated on the basis of the Institute, and during the siege of Leningrad, the research activities of the Institute continued.

Currently, the Institute is a large research and clinical institution, employing specialists in the fields of psychiatry, psychotherapy, medical psychology, narcology, neurology and neurosurgery.

== See also ==
- The Bekhterev Review of Psychiatry and Medical Psychology
