= List of neurologists and neurosurgeons =

This is a list of neurologists and neurosurgeons, with their year of birth and death and nationality. This list compiles the names of neurologists and neurosurgeons with a corresponding Wikipedia biographical article, and is not necessarily a reflection of their relative importance in the field. Many neurologists and neurosurgeons are considered to be neuroscientists as well and some neurologists are also in the list of psychiatrists.

Letter	Name	Lifespan	Nationality	Eponyms
A	Deepak Agrawal	1970 -	India	DREZotomy for Neuropathic pain
A	Joseph Abadie	1873 - 1934	France	Abadie's sign of tabes dorsalis
A	Adnan Abdallat	1943 - 2021	Jordan	Abdallat–Davis–Farrage syndrome
A	William John Adie	1886 - 1935	United Kingdom	Adie syndrome
A	Théophile Alajouanine	1890 - 1980	France	
A	Alois Alzheimer	1864 - 1915	Germany	Alzheimer's disease
A	Gabriel Anton	1858 - 1933	Austria	Anton syndrome
A	François-Amilcar Aran	1817 - 1861	France	Aran–Duchenne spinal muscular atrophy
A	Antônio Austregésilo	1876 - 1960	Brazil	
B	Joseph Babinski	1857 - 1932	France	Babinski sign
B	Percival Bailey	1892 - 1973	United States	
B	Brenda Banwell	1967 -	Canada	Multiple sclerosis, Neuromyelitis optica, MOG antibody disease
B	Jean Alexandre Barré	1880 - 1967	France	Guillain–Barré syndrome, Barré–Liéou syndrome, Barré test
B	Henry Charlton Bastian	1837 - 1915	United Kingdom	Bastian-Bruns sign
B	Diana Beck	1900 - 1956	United Kingdom	
B	Peter Emil Becker	1908 - 2000	Germany	Becker's muscular dystrophy
B	Charles Edward Beevor	1854 - 1908	United Kingdom	Beevor's sign, Beevor's axiom
B	Vladimir Bekhterev	1857 - 1927	Russia	Bekhterev–Jacobsohn reflex, Bekhterev–Mendel reflex, Bekhterev's disease, Bekhterev's mixture
B	Charles Bell	1774 - 1842	United Kingdom	Bell's palsy, Bell's phenomenon, Bell–Magendie law
B	Morris Bender	1905 - 1983	United States	
B	Hans Berger	1873 - 1941	Germany	Berger wave (rhythm)
B	Paul Robert Bing	1878 - 1956	Switzerland	Bing's sign
B	Lucio Bini	1908 - 1964	Italy	
B	Otto Ludwig Binswanger	1852 - 1929	Germany	Binswanger's disease
B	Désiré-Magloire Bourneville	1840 - 1909	France	Bourneville-Pringle syndrome
B	Russell Brain, 1st Baron Brain	1895 - 1966	United Kingdom	Brain's reflex
B	Édouard Brissaud	1852 - 1909	France	Brissaud's reflex
B	Paul Broca	1824 - 1880	France	Broca's aphasia, Broca's area
B	Korbinian Brodmann	1868 - 1918	Germany	Brodmann area
B	David R. Brown	1964 -	Australia	
B	Józef Brudziński	1874 - 1917	Poland	Brudziński's sign
B	Ludwig Bruns	1858 - 1916	Germany	Bruns apraxia, Bastian-Bruns sign, Bruns nystagmus
B	Serafima Bryusova	1894 - 1958	Soviet Union	
B	Paul Bucy	1904 - 1992	United States	Klüver–Bucy syndrome
B	Robert A. Burton		United States	
C	Donald Calne	1936 -	Canada	
C	Ben Carson	1951 -	United States	
C	Ugo Cerletti	1877 - 1963	Italy	
C	Charles Gilbert Chaddock	1861 - 1936	United States	Chaddock reflex
C	Jean-Martin Charcot	1825 - 1893	France	Charcot–Marie–Tooth disease, Charcot–Wilbrand syndrome, Charcot–Bouchard aneurysm, Charcot's triad
C	John Cheyne	1777 - 1836	British	Cheyne–Stokes respiration
C	Jeffrey A. Cohen	1954 -	United States	
C	Jules Cotard	1840 - 1889	France	Cotard delusion
C	Domenico Cotugno	1736 - 1822	Italy	
C	Hans Gerhard Creutzfeldt	1885 - 1964	Canada	Creutzfeldt–Jakob disease
C	James Crichton-Browne	1840 - 1938	United Kingdom	Crichton-Browne sign
C	MacDonald Critchley	1900 - 1997	United Kingdom	
C	Bernard Croisile		France	
C	Jeffrey Cummings	1962 -	United States	
C	Harvey Cushing	1869 - 1939	United States	Cushing reflex, Cushing's disease, Cushing's syndrome
D	Antonio Damasio	1944 -	Portugal	
D	Hanna Damasio	1942 -	Portugal	
D	Charles Loomis Dana	1852 – 1935	United States	
D	Walter Dandy	1886 - 1946	United States	Dandy–Walker syndrome
D	Daoud Mustafa Khalid	1917 - 2008	Sudan	Daoud Research Group
D	Dirk De Ridder	1966 -	Belgium	
D	Augusta Déjerine-Klumpke	1859 - 1927	United States	Dejerine-Klumpke paralysis
D	Joseph Jules Dejerine	1849 - 1917	France	Dejerine-Roussy syndrome, Dejerine-Sottas disease, Landouzy-Dejerine syndrome
D	Mahlon DeLong	1938 - 2024	United States	
D	Margaret Dix	1902 - 1991	United Kingdom	Dix–Hallpike test
D	Guillaume Duchenne	1806 - 1875	France	Duchenne muscular dystrophy, Duchenne-Aran spinal muscular atrophy, Erb-Duchenne palsy, Duchenne smile
E	Constantin von Economo	1876 - 1931	Austria	von Economo neurons
E	Wilhelm Heinrich Erb	1840 - 1921	Germany	Erb's palsy
F	David Ferrier	1843 - 1924	United Kingdom	
F	C. Miller Fisher	1913 - 2012	Canada	Miller Fisher test, Miller Fisher Syndrome
F	Edward Flatau	1868 - 1932	Poland	
F	Otfrid Foerster	1873 - 1941	Germany	
F	Charles Foix	1882 - 1927	France	Foix–Alajouanine syndrome
F	Walter Jackson Freeman II	1895 - 1972	United States	
F	Sigmund Freud	1856 - 1939	Austria	Freudian slip
F	Łucja Frey	1889 - 1942	Poland	Frey's syndrome
F	Nikolaus Friedreich	1825 - 1882	Germany	Friedreich's ataxia, Friedreich's sign
F	Adolf Albrecht Friedländer	1870 - 1949	Austria	
F	Jules Froment	1878 - 1946	France	Froment's sign
G	Paulo Garcia	1959 - 2010	Brazil	
G	Henri Gastaut	1915 - 1995	France	Lennox-Gastaut syndrome
G	Norman Geschwind	1926 - 1984	United States	Geschwind syndrome, Geschwind–Galaburda hypothesis
G	Joseph Godwin Greenfield	1884 - 1958	United Kingdom	Greenfield's disease
G	Rickman Godlee	1849 - 1925	United Kingdom	
G	Justo Gonzalo	1910 - 1986	Spain	
G	Alfred Gordon	1874 - 1953	France - United States	Gordon's sign
G	William Richard Gowers	1845 - 1915	United Kingdom	Gowers' sign
G	Georges Guillain	1876 - 1961	France	Guillain–Barré syndrome, Triangle of Guillain-Mollaret
G	Sanjay Gupta	1969 -	United States	
H	Salomón Hakim	1922 - 2011	Colombia	
H	William Alexander Hammond	1828 - 1900	United States	
H	Anita Harding	1952 - 1995	Ireland-United Kingdom	
H	Henry Head	1861 - 1940	United Kingdom	
H	Salomon Eberhard Henschen	1847 - 1930	Sweden	
H	Juha Hernesniemi	1947 - 2023	Finland	
H	Johann Hoffmann	1857 - 1919	Germany	Hoffmann's reflex, Hoffmann's sign, Werdnig–Hoffmann disease
H	Gordon Morgan Holmes	1876 - 1965	Ireland	Holmes rebound phenomenon, Holmes tremor
H	Victor Horsley	1857 - 1916	United Kingdom	Horsley–Clarke apparatus
H	Robert Roland Hughes	1911 - 1991	United Kingdom	
H	James Ramsay Hunt	1872 - 1937	United States	Ramsay Hunt syndrome
H	Janina Hurynowicz	1894 - 1967	Poland	
H	Abbashar Hussein	1959 -	Sudan	
I	Ivan Izquierdo	1937 - 2021	Brazil	
J	John Hughlings Jackson	1834 - 1911	United Kingdom	Jacksonian seizure
J	Louis Jacobsohn-Lask	1863 - 1941	Germany	Bekhterev–Jacobsohn reflex
J	Alfons Maria Jakob	1884 - 1931	Germany	Creutzfeldt–Jakob disease
J	Herbert Jasper	1906 - 1999	Canada	
J	Ernő Jendrassik	1858 - 1921	Hungary	Jendrassik maneuver
J	Friedrich Jolly	1844 - 1904	Germany	Jolly's test
J	Karolina Jus	1914 – 2002	Polish-Canadian	
K	Sean Kenniff	1969 -	United States	
K	Robert Foster Kennedy	1884 - 1952	Ireland and United States	Foster Kennedy syndrome
K	Woldemar Kernig	1840 - 1917	Russia	Kernig's sign
K	Karl Kleist	1879 - 1961	Germany	
K	Gitte Moos Knudsen	1959 -	Denmark	
K	Sergei Sergeievich Korsakoff	1854 - 1900	Russia	Wernicke–Korsakoff syndrome, Korsakoff's syndrome
K	Georg N. Koskinas	1885 - 1975	Greece	
K	John Krakauer	1967 -	United States	
L	Charles Lasègue	1816 - 1883	France	Lasègue's sign
L	Rita Levi-Montalcini	1909 - 2012	Italy	Nobel Prize in Physiology or Medicine
L	Gabrielle Charlotte Lévy	1886 - 1934	France	Roussy–Lévy syndrome
L	Jean Lhermitte	1877 - 1959	France	Lhermitte's sign, Lhermitte–Duclos disease
L	Hugo Liepmann	1863 - 1925	Germany	
L	Zachary London	1976 -	United States	Neuromuscular disease
M	B. K. Misra	1953 -	India	
M	William Macewen	1848 - 1924	United Kingdom	Macewen's sign
M	Samia Maimani	1955 - 1997	Saudi Arabia	
M	Pierre Marie	1853 - 1940	France	Charcot–Marie–Tooth disease
M	Gheorghe Marinescu	1863 - 1938	Romania	Marinesco–Sjögren syndrome
M	C. David Marsden	1938 - 1998	United Kingdom	
M	Ladislas J. Meduna	1896 - 1964	Hungary	
M	Friedrich Meggendorfer	1880 - 1953	Germany	
M	Kurt Mendel	1874 - 1946	Germany	Bekhterev–Mendel reflex
M	H. Houston Merritt	1902 - 1979	United States	
M	Giovanni Mingazzini	1859 - 1929	Italy	Mingazzini test
M	Pierre Mollaret	1898 - 1987	France	Triangle of Guillain-Mollaret, Mollaret's meningitis
M	Constantin von Monakow	1853 - 1930	Switzerland	
M	Egas Moniz	1874 - 1955	Portugal	Moniz sign
M	Karin Muraszko	1957 -	United States	
M	Abraham Myerson	1881 - 1948	United States	Myerson's sign
N	Paolo Nichelli		Italy	
N	Max Nonne	1861 - 1959	Germany	
N	Ralph Northam	1959 -	United States	
O	Herbert Olivecrona	1891 - 1980	Sweden	
O	Hermann Oppenheim	1858 - 1919	Germany	Oppenheim's sign
P	James Papez	1883 - 1958	United States	Papez circuit
P	Carlos Pardo-Villamizar		Colombia	
P	Ambroise Paré	1510 - 1590	France	
P	James Parkinson	1755 - 1824	United Kingdom	Parkinson's disease
P	Wilder Penfield	1891 - 1976	United States	
P	Charles Poser	1923 - 2010	United States	
P	Ludvig Puusepp	1875 - 1942	Estonia	
Q	Hans Heinrich Georg Queckenstedt	1876 - 1918	Germany	Queckenstedt's maneuver
R	Marcus Raichle	1937-	United States	
R	Vilayanur S. Ramachandran	1951-	India	
R	Ricardo Ramina	1951 -	Brazil	
R	Robert Wheeler Rand	1928 - 2013	United States	
R	Wade Regehr		Canada	
R	Franco Regli	1931 - 2017	Switzerland	
R	Ali Rezai	1965	United States	
R	Helena Riggs	1899 - 1968	United States	
R	Moritz Heinrich Romberg	1795 - 1873	Germany	Romberg's test
R	Grigory Rossolimo	1860 - 1928	Russia	Rossolimo's sign
S	Oliver Sacks	1933 - 2015	United Kingdom	
S	Manfred Sakel	1900 - 1957	Poland	
S	Majid Samii	1937 -	Iran - Germany	
S	Robert Sapolsky	1957 -	United States	
S	Hermann Schloffer	1868 - 1937	Austria	
S	William Beecher Scoville	1906 - 1984	United States	
S	Jean-Athanase Sicard	1872 - 1929	France	Collet-Sicard syndrome
S	Pankaj Sharma		United Kingdom	
S	Pratibha Singhi	1951 -	India	Pediatrics
S	Robert F. Spetzler	1944-	United States, Germany	Spetzler-Martin grading of Cerebral arteriovenous malformation
S	Roy Glenwood Spurling	1894 - 1968	United States	Spurling's test
S	Adolph Strümpell	1853 - 1925	Baltic German	Strümpell-Lorrain disease, Strümpell's sign
T	Charlie Teo	1957-	Australia	
T	Tom Bentley Throckmorton	1885 - 1961	United States	Throckmorton's reflex
T	Jules Tinel	1879 - 1952	France	Tinel's sign
T	Robert Bentley Todd	1809 - 1860	Ireland	Todd's paresis
T	Howard Henry Tooth	1856 - 1925	United Kingdom	Charcot–Marie–Tooth disease
V	Oskar Vogt	1870 - 1959	Germany	
V	N. K. Venkataramana		India	
W	Juhn Atsushi Wada	1924 - 2023	Japan - Canada	Wada test
W	Arthur Earl Walker	1907 - 1995	United States	Dandy–Walker syndrome
W	Adolf Wallenberg	1862 - 1949	Germany	Wallenberg syndrome
W	Julius Wagner-Jauregg	1857 - 1940	Austria	
W	Robert Wartenberg	1887 - 1956	United States	Wartenberg wheel
W	Karl Friedrich Otto Westphal	1833 - 1890	Germany	Edinger–Westphal nucleus
W	Robert Whytt	1714 - 1766	United Kingdom	
W	Thomas Willis	1621 - 1675	United Kingdom	Circle of Willis
W	Samuel Alexander Kinnier Wilson	1878 - 1937	United Kingdom	Wilson's disease
W	Tissa Wijeratne		Sri Lanka and Australia	Post Covid-19 Neurological Syndrome, Serial Systemic Immune Inflammatory Indices
Y	Gazi Yaşargil	1925 - 2025	Turkey	

== See also ==
- History of neurology and neurosurgery
- Neurology
- List of neuroscientists
- List of women neuroscientists
- Neurosurgery
- Head injury
- Brain damage
- Neurosurgeons in India

== Bibliography ==
- Webb Haymaker and Francis Schiller: The Founders of Neurology: One Hundred and Forty-Six Biographical Sketches. Springfield, Ill., Charles Thomas, 1970.
- Kurt Kolle (edit.): Grosse Nervenärzte, 1-3 Vol., Stuttgart, Georg Thieme, 1963-1970.
