= Brissaud =

Brissaud is a French surname. Notable people with the surname include:

- Édouard Brissaud (1852–1909), French physician and pathologist
  - Brissaud's reflex, a medical sign
- Geoffrey Brissaud (born 1998), French ice dancer
- Laurent Brissaud (born 1965), French slalom canoeist
- Manuel Brissaud, French slalom canoeist
- Pierre Brissaud (1885–1964), French artist
