= Maimani =

Maimani, Al Maimani, or Al-Maimani (Arabic: الْمَيْمَنِيّ) is a surname. Notable people with the surname include:

- Badar Al-Maimani (born 1984), Omani football manager and former footballer
- Samia Maimani, Saudi professor
- Yasmeen Al Maimani, Saudi airline pilot
