= Movement Disorders (journal) =

- Discipline: Neurology
- Language: English
- Edited by: A. Jon Stoessl

Publication details
- History: 1986–present
- Publisher: Wiley-Liss (United States)
- Frequency: 16/year
- Impact factor: 9.698 (2021)

Standard abbreviations
- ISO 4: Mov. Disord.

Indexing
- CODEN: MOVDEA
- ISSN: 0885-3185 (print); 1531-8257 (web)
- OCLC no.: 12616375

Links
- Journal homepage; Online access; Online archive

Movement Disorders is a peer-reviewed medical journal, first published in 1986. The journal focuses on original research relating to neurological movement disorders. The editor-in-chief is A. Jon Stoessl (University of British Columbia).

== Abstracting and indexing ==
The journal is abstracted and indexed in: Current Advances in Neuroscience, Current Awareness in Biological Sciences, Current Contents/Clinical Medicine, Current Contents/Life Sciences, EMBASE/Excerpta Medica, Index Medicus/MEDLINE/PubMed, Journal Citation Reports/Science Edition, Science Citation Index, and Scopus.

According to the Journal Citation Reports, the journal has a 2021 impact factor of 9.698, ranking it 16th out of 212 journals in the category "Clinical Neurology".
