= Calne (surname) =

Calne is a Celtic surname. Notable people with the surname include:

- Donald Calne (born 1936), Canadian neurologist
- Roy Calne (1930–2024), British surgeon and pioneer in organ transplantation

== See also ==
- Everard of Calne (died c. 1146), medieval Bishop of Norwich.
