= Kennedy's syndrome =

Kennedy's syndrome may mean:

- Foster Kennedy syndrome
- Kennedy's disease, a U.S. name for spinal and bulbar muscular atrophy
