= Carl Wheeler =

Carl Wheeler may refer to:

- Carl Wheeler, a member of Tony! Toni! Toné!
- Jordan Carl Wheeler Davis (born 1988), American singer
- Carl Wheeler Rand, father of Robert Wheeler Rand
