= Abbashar Hussein =

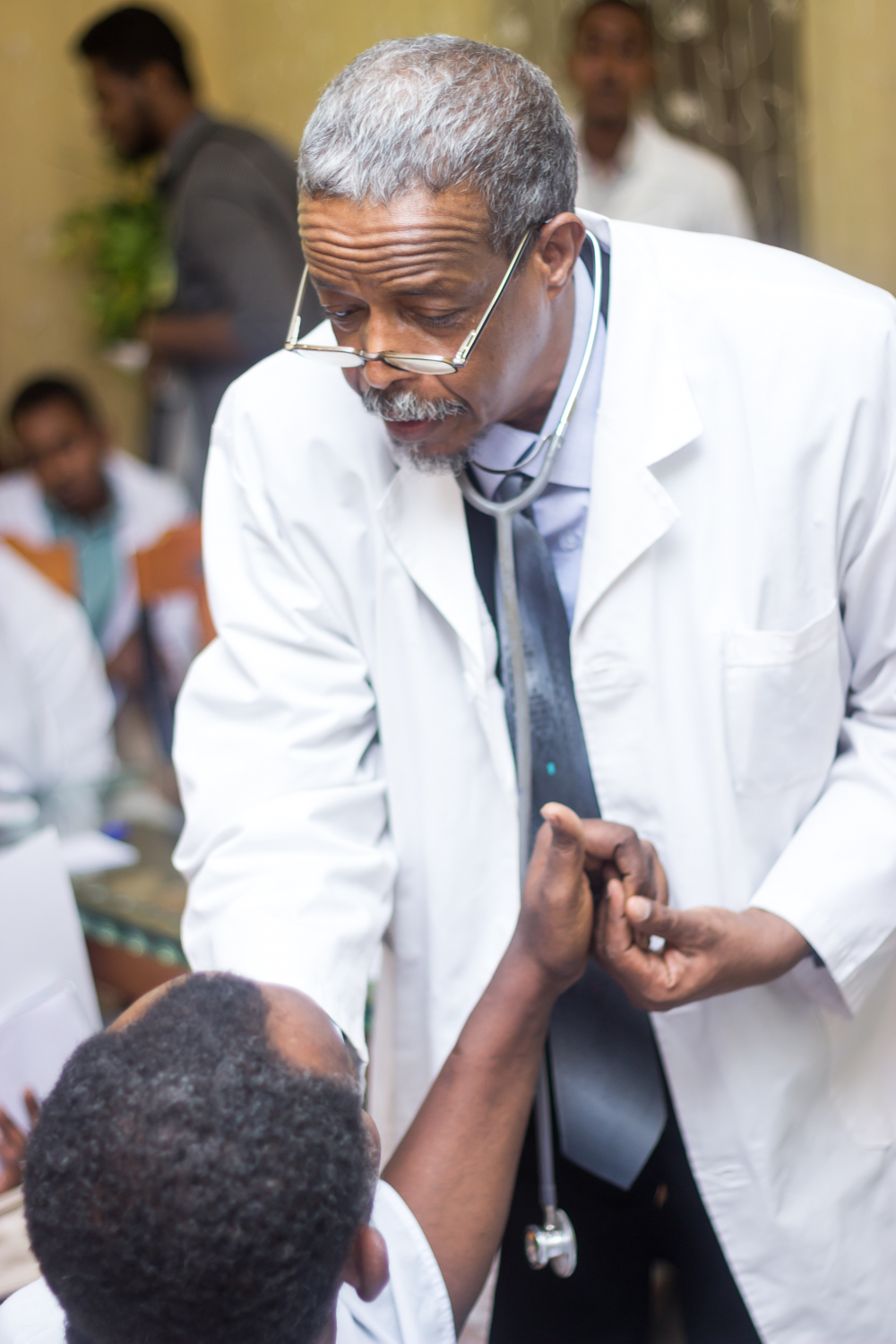
- Born: 10 April 1959 (age 67)
- Occupation: Neurologist

Abbashar Hussein (Arabic: أبشر حسين; born 10 April 1959) is a Sudanese neurologist, scholar, and professor at University of Khartoum. He is known for founding Daoud Research Group, a non-profit organization that provides free health care for neurology patients in Sudan.

== Career ==
Abbashar is a professor of Neurology at University of Khartoum. He graduated from university of khartoum faculty of Medicine in 1984

== Charity work ==
In 1995, Abbashar founded Daoud Research Group (DRG) (named after his professor Daoud Mustafa Khalid), a non-profit organization that provide care for patients in need for neurological evaluation and treatment. As part of DRG, he runs Daoud Charity Clinic, in Banat, where he treats patients for free every Friday. It attract patients from all over Sudan. He also uses his profits from his private clinic to support patients in need with free medication and covers their transportation costs. Daoud Charity Clinic is also attended by number of doctors and medical students; and usually continues and till Fajr Prayer. He also established Daoud Mobile Charity Clinic, in which he and number of volunteers; including doctors and medical students travel to provide free specialized neurology consultation and evaluation for patients in rural areas around Sudan.
