= Sigbert Josef Maria Ganser =

German psychiatrist

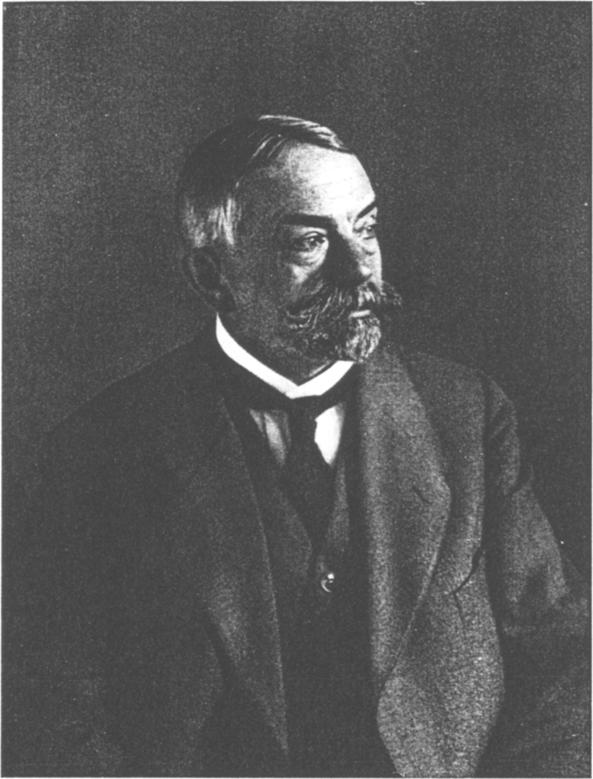
- Born: Sigbert Josef Maria Ganser; 24 January 1853
- Died: 4 January 1931 (aged 77)

Sigbert Josef Maria Ganser (24 January 1853, Rhaunen, Rhine Province – 4 January 1931, Dresden, Saxony) was a German psychiatrist born in Rhaunen.

He earned his medical doctorate in 1876 from the Ludwig-Maximilians-Universität München. Afterwards he worked briefly at a psychiatric clinic in Würzburg, and later as an assistant to neuroanatomist Bernhard von Gudden (1824-1886) in Munich. In 1886, he became head of the psychiatric department at Dresden General Hospital. Among his students was neurologist Hans Queckenstedt (1876-1918).

Sigbert Ganser is remembered for a hysterical disorder that he first described in 1898. He identified the disorder in three prisoners while working at a prison in Halle. The features included approximate or nonsensical answers to simple questions, perceptual abnormalities, and clouding of consciousness. Ganser believed that these symptoms were an associative reaction caused by an unconscious attempt by the patient to escape from an intolerable mental situation. The disorder was to become known as Ganser syndrome.

== Written works ==
- Über einen eigenartigen hysterischen Dämmerzustand Archiv für Psychiatrie und Nervenkrankheiten, Berlin, 1898, 30: 633–640. English translation by C.E. Schorer: "A peculiar hysterical state". British Journal of Criminology, 1965, 5: 120–126. Diagnostic and statistical manual of mental disorder. 3rd edition, Washington, American Psychiatric Association, D. C., 1987, pp. 77.
