= Tobey–Ayer Test =

Medical test

- Purpose: determine lateral sinus thrombosis

The Tobey–Ayer test is used for lateral sinus thrombosis by monitoring cerebrospinal fluid pressure during a lumbar puncture. No increase of cerebrospinal fluid pressure during compression of the internal jugular vein on the affected side, and an exaggerated response on the patent side, is suggestive of lateral sinus thrombosis.

== History ==
Tobey–Ayer test was the first specific test for lateral sinus thrombosis. It was created by Tobey, G. L. and Ayer, J. B. in 1925 when they first introduced modifications to the Queckenstedt's maneuver test used at the time to diagnose obstruction to spinal cerebrospinal fluid flow.
