= Jon Stoessl =

Alexander Jon Stoessl is a Canadian neurologist and Parkinson's disease researcher. He is the director of the Pacific Parkinson's Research Centre and Parkinson's Foundation Centre of Excellence at the University of British Columbia (UBC). He is also the head of the division of neurology at this university. He is past President of the World Parkinson Coalition.

== Early life and education ==
Stoessl was born in London, England. In 1960, when Stoessl was a child, he and his family moved from England to London, Ontario, after his father was offered a job in Canada. He received his medical degree from the University of Western Ontario in 1979, after which he completed an internship at McGill University and a residency in neurology at the University of Western Ontario, where he studied alongside Alastair Buchan.

== Career ==
In 1984, Stoessl joined the faculty of the University of British Columbia, where he worked on the positron emission tomography program with Donald Calne for two years. He then worked at the Neuroscience Research Centre in the UK for two years in the late 1980s. In 1996, he joined the faculty of UBC again, where he has remained ever since.

== Scientific work ==
In 2001, Stoessl published a paper in Science which found that the placebo effect in Parkinson's disease might be due to patients' anticipation of benefit, and that substantial dopamine is released in the brains of Parkinson's patients in response to placebo administration. Subsequent research by Stoessl has found that dopamine is released in the brain of Parkinson's patients when they are given a placebo, but only if they are told the probability of it being a real drug is 75 percent. He has said that "In Parkinson's, as in many other conditions, there is an important placebo response and that can be measured with clinical outcomes."

== Awards and honors ==
Stoessl holds a Canada Research Chair. He was awarded the fourth annual Donald Calne Lectureship in 2006 by Parkinson Society Canada and was named a Member of the Order of Canada in 2007.
