= Daoud Research Group =

Daoud Research Group مجموعة داؤود البحثية
- مجموعة داؤود البحثية
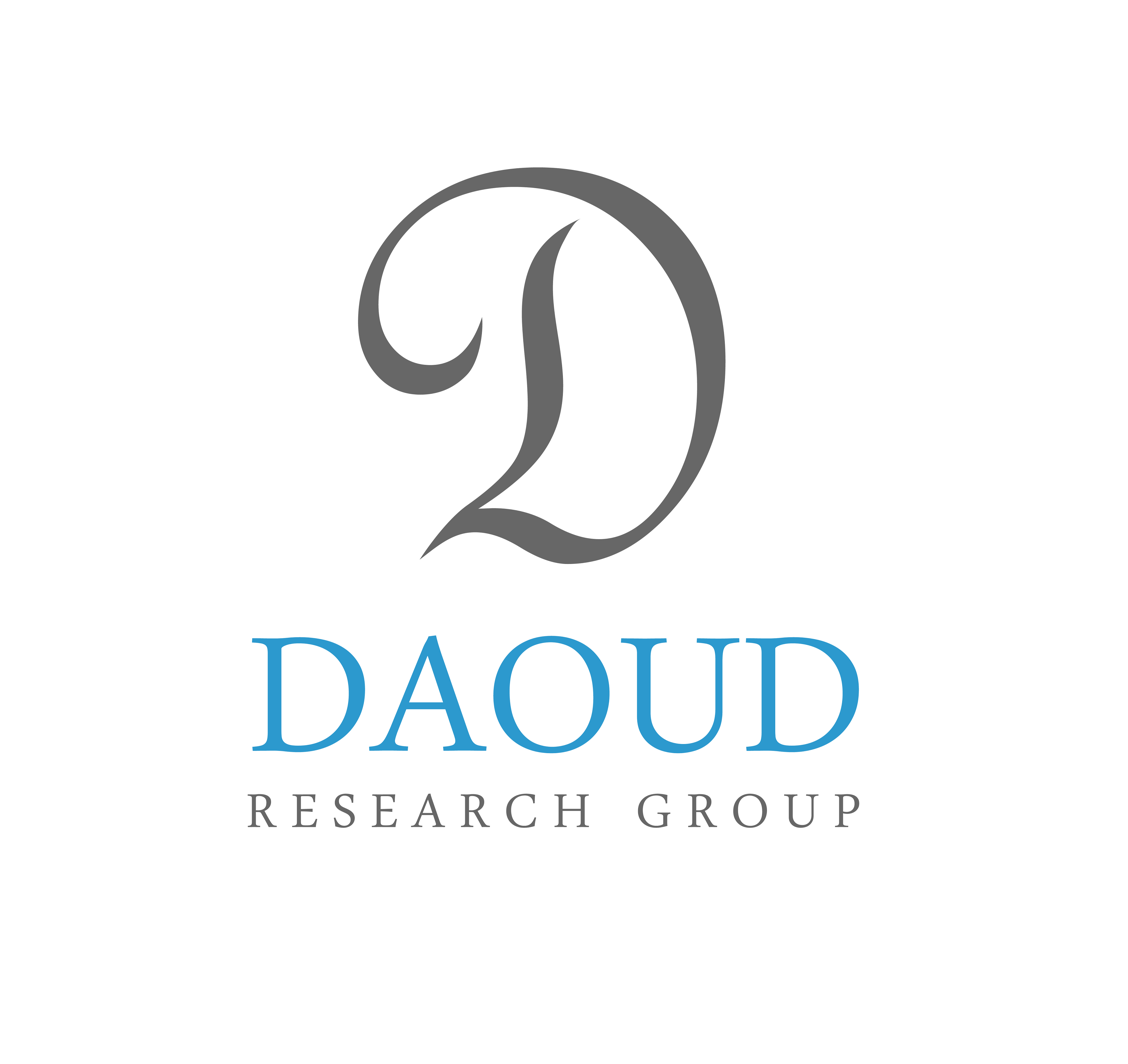
- Named after: Daoud Mustafa Khalid
- Formation: 1995; 31 years ago
- Founder: Abbashar Hussein
- Founded at: Sudan
- Type: Nonprofit
- Website: http://daoudresearch.com

Daoud Research Group (DRG) (Arabic: مجموعة داؤود البحثية) is a Sudan–based nonprofit organization with a mission to provide neurology care for patients in need, and to give more chances for health professionals in the field of neurological researches. DRG was founded by Professor Abbashar Hussein in 1995

== History ==
In 1995, Daoud Research Group (DRG) was founded by Professor Abbashar Hussein. He named it after his professor Daoud Mustafa Khalid.

== Daoud Charity Clinics ==
Daoud Charity Clinic (DCC) is held in Banat every Friday and usually continues and till Fajr prayer. Abbashar, with the help of other volunteers, medical students and doctors, evaluate patients in need of neurological care and evaluation for free. Medications and cost of transport are also provided for free for patients in need. DCC attracts patients from all over Sudan.

Daoud Mobile Charity Clinic (DMCC), Abbashar and number of volunteers; including doctors and medical students travel to provide free specialized neurology consultation and evaluation for patients in rural areas around Sudan.
