= Zachary London =

Neurology professor

- Born: 1976 (age 49–50)
- Education: Brown University; University of Wisconsin–Madison
- Known for: Neurology education, game development
- Awards: 2023 AAN A. B. Baker Award for Lifetime Achievement in Neurology Education, 2020 AANEM Innovation Achievement Award
- Scientific career
- Fields: Neurology, neuromuscular disease, education
- Workplaces: University of Michigan Medical School

Zachary London is an American scientist. He is the James W. Albers Collegiate Professor of Neurology at the University of Michigan and program director of the neurology residency at the University of Michigan. He specializes in neuromuscular disease and electromyography. He has been celebrated for his innovative approach to interactive educational tools, and received the American Academy of Neurology A. B. Baker Award for Lifetime Achievement in Neurology Education in 2023.

== Early life and education ==
London grew up in Wisconsin. He attended Brown University for undergraduate studies and went to medical school at the University of Wisconsin–Madison.

After a preliminary medicine internship at St. Joseph Mercy Hospital in Ann Arbor, London completed his neurology residency at the University of Michigan, where he remained for a fellowship in clinical neurophysiology and electromyography.

== Career ==
In 2006, London joined the faculty at the University of Michigan as a neuromuscular specialist. He has published on the use of electromyography and nerve conduction studies as diagnostic tools and on pain during these studies.

He later became director of the residency program. He has published extensively on educational techniques in neurology medical education, and on the residency and fellowship process.

He is a fellow of the American Academy of Neurology and has been involved with the Graduate Education subcommittee. He is active in the American Association of Neuromuscular and Electrodiagnostic Medicine and is a mentor on the Young Leadership Council.

=== Game development and education ===
London has focused his academic scholarship on the development of interactive educational tools. In 2007, London created a web-based tool to teach electromyography called EMG Whiz. He later developed two free mobile apps, Nerve Whiz and Neuro Localizer to teach the basics of neurological localization.

In 2015, with his colleague James Burke, London developed an educational board game called The Lesion: Charcot's Tournament. This was funded by the Jerry Isler Neuromuscular Fund.

Additional games have included:

- The Plexus
- Cranial Vault with Cory Dobson
- Foramina! with Mikaela Stiver
- Endowed Chairs: Neurology and Endowed Chairs: Pediatrics with Alison Christy
- Neurdle with Alison Christy
- Rooticle
- Dictation Errors with Jordan Newman
- Battle Thunder Worm with Malcolm London and Micah Wolkenberg

London also works to teach neurologists to develop games for neurology education and to use games for neurology education.

=== Hard Taco Project ===
London started recording one song every month in 1993, under the name "Hard Taco Project." He creates a song for every board game he makes. Songs are available at his website, and have been on Spotify starting in 2023.

London also makes videos using puppets for parody songs, with his students and wife Lauren Schwartz London, often to educate about topics in neurology or illustrate underlying issues in the culture of medicine.

== Awards and honors ==
- 2008 Status Pedagogicus Award
- 2015 Teaching Innovation Prize, University of Michigan
- 2020 American Association of Neuromuscular and Electrodiagnostic Medicine Innovation Award
- 2023 American Academy of Neurology A. B. Baker Award for Lifetime Achievement in Neurologic Education

== Select publications ==
- Di Luca, DG; Lazar, SM; Gupta, P; Lukban, MCS; Crowson, C; Albert, DVF; Moeller, JJ; Fernandez, A; Southerland, AM; London, Z (Dec 2023). "How to Peer Review a Neurology Education Manuscript". Neurology: Education. 2 (4) e200099. doi:10.1212/NE9.0000000000200099. PMC 11419298.
- Davalos, L; Watanabe, M; Gallagher, GW; Grewal, A; Fudym, Y; Reynolds, EL; Callaghan, BC; Banarjee, M; London, ZN (2023). "Diagnostic characteristics of nerve conduction study parameters for vasculitic neuropathy". Muscle Nerve. 67 (1): 45–51. doi:10.1002/mus.27753. PMC 10100037. PMID 36367146.
- Becker, B; London, ZN (2022). "Assessment of clinical skills in electrodiagnostic medicine". Muscle Nerve. 66 (6): 647–649. doi:10.1002/mus.27733. hdl:2027.42/175211. PMID 36213950..
- London, ZN; Gable, KL; Govindarajan, R; Guidon, AC; Gwathmey, KG; Hehir, MK; Imperioli, M; Laughlin, RS; Price, RS; Sakamuri, S; Sokol, J; Baer, M (2022). "The neuromuscular fellowship portal and match". Muscle Nerve. 65 (6): 640–645. doi:10.1002/mus.27525. PMC 9314681. PMID 35213933.doi:10.1016/j.pediatrneurol.2016.10.017
- London, ZN; Mahajan, A; Cahill, C; Khan, J; Schuyler, EA; Price, RS (2022). "The Neurology Fellowship Application Conundrum: Finding Common Ground". Neurology. 98 (22): 929–937. doi:10.1212/WNL.0000000000200717. PMID 35444052..doi:10.1371/journal.pone.0133002
- Davalos, L; Nowacek, DG; London, ZN (2022). "Distal symmetric polyneuropathy phenotype in patients with sensory neuronopathy at the time of electrodiagnosis". Muscle Nerve. 65 (4): 456–459. doi:10.1002/mus.27488. hdl:2027.42/172026. PMID 34994975..
- Siegler, JE; Boreskie, PE; Strowd, R; Rook, R; Goss, A; Al-Mufti, F; Rossow, B; Miller, A; Chamberlain, A; London, Z; Hurley, J; Geocadin, R; Richie, M; Isaacson, R; Rybinnik, I; Chan, TM (2021). "Neurology podcast utilization during the COVID-19 pandemic". Neurol Sci. 42 (11): 4437–4445. doi:10.1007/s10072-021-05549-9. PMC 8357627. PMID 34383158.
- Schaefer, SM; London, Z; Ferrara, JM; McCoyd, MA; Cronin, C; Pharr, EP; Price, R; Rigby, HB; Vota, S; Cincotta, M; Slade, MD; Moeller, JJ (2021). "Multi-Residency Implementation of an Online Movement Disorders Curriculum Based on Real Patient Videos". Tremor Other Hyperkinet Mov (N Y). 11: 38. doi:10.5334/tohm.654. PMC 8462470. PMID 34621598.
- Lavette, LE; Miller, A; Rook, B; London, Z; Cook, C; Merkler, AE; Santini, V; Ruff, IM; Kraakevik, J; Smith, D; Anderson, WE; Johnson, SL; Yan, PZ; Sweeney, J; Chamberlain, A; Rogers-Baggett, B; Isaacson, R; Strowd, RE (2021). "Education Research: NeuroBytes: A New Rapid, High-Yield e-Learning Platform for Continuing Professional Development in Neurology". Neurology. 97 (8): 393–400. doi:10.1212/WNL.0000000000012133. PMID 33931531..
- Mahajan, A; Davalos, L; Schneider, L; Bailey, M; Khan, J; London, Z (2021). "The impact of student debt on neurological practice". J Neurol Sci. 427 117536. doi:10.1016/j.jns.2021.117536. PMID 34139451..
- Mahajan, A; London, Z; Southerland, AM; Khan, J; Schuyler, EA (2021). "Immigrant Neurologists in the United States: The Path of Most Resistance". Neurology. 96 (8): 378–385. doi:10.1212/WNL.0000000000011196. PMID 33199436..
- Becker, CJ; McDermott, M; London, ZN (2021). "Declining use of neurological eponyms in cases where a non-eponymous alternative exists". Clin Neurol Neurosurg. 200 106367. doi:10.1016/j.clineuro.2020.106367. PMID 33271406..
- London, ZN (2020). "A Structured Approach to the Diagnosis of Peripheral Nervous System Disorders". Continuum (Minneap Minn). 26 (5): 1130–1160. doi:10.1212/CON.0000000000000922. PMID 33002996..
- Dupuis, JE; Li, J; Callaghan, BC; Reynolds, EL; London, ZN (2019). "Bilateral nerve conduction studies in the evaluation of distal symmetric polyneuropathy". Muscle Nerve. 60 (3): 305–307. doi:10.1002/mus.26616. hdl:2027.42/151276. PMID 31228276..
- London, ZN; Nowacek, DG (2019). "Does cerebrospinal fluid analysis have a meaningful role in the diagnosis of chronic inflammatory demyelinating polyradiculoneuropathy?". Muscle Nerve. 60 (2): 111–113. doi:10.1002/mus.26513. hdl:2027.42/150522. PMID 31090075..
- London, ZN; Greenwood, R (2019). "Neurology workforce deficits: Is allopathic medical student recruitment the answer?". Neurology. 92 (17): 786–787. doi:10.1212/WNL.0000000000007356. PMID 30926685..
- London, ZN; Khan, J; Cahill, C; Schuyler, E; Wold, J; Southerland, AM (2018). "2017 Program Director Survey: Feedback from your adult neurology residency leadership". Neurology. 91 (15): e1448–e1454. doi:10.1212/WNL.0000000000006315. PMID 30194246..
- McDermott, M; Gelb, DJ; Wilson, K; Pawloski, M; Burke, JF; Shelgikar, AV; London, ZN (2018). "Sex Differences in Academic Rank and Publication Rate at Top-Ranked US Neurology Programs". JAMA Neurol. 75 (8): 956–961. doi:10.1001/jamaneurol.2018.0275. PMC 6142929. PMID 29610899.
- Wong, VSS; Strowd, RE 3rd; Aragón-García, R; Moon, YP; Ford, B; Haut, SR; Kass, JS; London, ZN; Mays, M; Milligan, TA; Price, RS; Reynolds, PS; Selwa, LM; Spencer, DC; Elkind, MSV (2017). "Mentored peer review of standardized manuscripts as a teaching tool for residents: a pilot randomized controlled multi-center study". Res Integr Peer Rev. 2 6. doi:10.1186/s41073-017-0032-0. PMC 5803578. PMID 29451555.
- London, ZN; Gallagher, GW; Ebright, MJ (2017). "A Self-Study Curriculum in Electromyography and Nerve Conduction Studies for Residents and Fellows". MedEdPORTAL. 13 10581. doi:10.15766/mep_2374-8265.10581. PMC 6338186. PMID 30800783.
- London, ZN (2017). "Safety and pain in electrodiagnostic studies". Muscle Nerve. 55 (2): 149–159. doi:10.1002/mus.25421. hdl:2027.42/136014. PMID 27680535..
- London, ZN; Khan, J (2015). "Is it time already to revise the Neurology Milestones?". Neurology. 84 (22): 2206–7. doi:10.1212/WNL.0000000000001650. PMID 25934849..
- Verson, J; Haig, AJ; Sandella, D; Yamakawa, KS; London, Z; Tomkins-Lane, C (2015). "Patient perception of pain versus observed pain behavior during a standardized electrodiagnostic test". Muscle Nerve. 51 (2): 185–91. doi:10.1002/mus.24308. PMC 4254897. PMID 24895249.
- London, ZN; Burke, JF; Hazan, R; Hastings, MM; Callaghan, BC (2014). "Electromyography-related pain: muscle selection is the key modifiable study characteristic". Muscle Nerve. 49 (4): 570–4. doi:10.1002/mus.23974. hdl:2027.42/106736. PMID 23893537..
- London, ZN; Hazan, R; Burke, JF; Callaghan, BC (2014). "Altering electromyography studies: importance of the electromyographer's perception of patient pain". Arch Phys Med Rehabil. 95 (1): 39–42. doi:10.1016/j.apmr.2013.08.003. PMID 23973444..
- London, Z; Albers, JW (2007). "Toxic neuropathies associated with pharmaceutic and industrial agents". Neurol Clin. 25 (1): 257–76. doi:10.1016/j.ncl.2006.10.001. PMID 17324727..
