= Bernard Croisile =

Bernard Croisile is a neurologist and neuropsychologist who has been the chair of the neuropsychology department at the Neurological Hospital of Lyon, France, since 1992. Croisile has written several hundred peer-reviewed articles for scientific publications, papers, and book chapters on aging and cognition. He received his M.D. and certification in neurology from Lyon Hospitals and his neurosciences specialty degree and Ph.D. in neuropsychology from University Claude Bernard in Lyon, France.

In 1998, Croisile was the recipient of the Alzheimer's Disease Parke-Davis Award.
