= Brenda Banwell =

Pediatric neurologist and academic

- Born: 1967 (age 58–59); Winnipeg, Canada
- Education: University of Western Ontario
- Known for: International expert in pediatric demyelinating diseases including multiple sclerosis, neuromyelitis optica and MOG antibody disease
- Awards: 2007 Women Against Multiple Sclerosis - Woman of the Year Award, 2015 American Academy of Neurology Sydney Carter Lifetime Achievement Award in Child Neurology, 2016 The Lady Barbara Colyton Prize for Autoimmune Research, Perelman School of Medicine, University of Pennsylvania
- Scientific career
- Fields: Neurology, pediatrics, neuroimmunology, neuromuscular disease
- Workplaces: University of Toronto; University of Pennsylvania Medical School; Children's Hospital of Philadelphia

Brenda Banwell is Chief of the Division of Neurology and Co-Director of the Neuroscience Center, and Professor of Neurology at Children's Hospital of Philadelphia and holder of the Grace R. Loeb Endowed Chair in Neurosciences. She also holds the title of Professor of Pediatrics and Neurology at the Perelman School of Medicine at the University of Pennsylvania.

Banwell is the co-director of the Pediatric Multiple Sclerosis and Neuroinflammatory Disorders Clinic at the Children's Hospital of Philadelphia. She has published extensively on pediatric demyelinating diseases including multiple sclerosis, neuromyelitis optica and MOG antibody disease. Banwell is the co-director of the Canadian Pediatric Demyelinating Disease Network, the chair of the International Pediatric Multiple Sclerosis Study Group, and the chair of the International Medical and Scientific Board of the MS International Federation. Banwell also sits on the International Advisory Committee on Clinical Trials of New Drugs in Multiple Sclerosis.

Banwell is a fellow of the American Academy of Neurology, and serves as vice chair of the Academic Neurology Committee. She has been active in the European Committee for Treatment and Research in Multiple Sclerosis (ECTRIMS), delivering the 2022 ECTRIMS lecture.

== Early life and education ==
Banwell was born in Winnipeg, Canada. She did her undergraduate training at the University of Western Ontario, where she remained for her MD and her residency in pediatrics. She completed her pediatric neurology residency at the University of Toronto Hospital for Sick Children, where she was chief resident. She then went to Mayo Clinic for a two year fellowship in neuromuscular disease.

== Career and Research ==
Banwell returned to the University of Toronto Hospital for Sick Children as an assistant professor in 1999. She became a full professor at the University of Toronto in 2012. In July 2012, she took a position as full professor in neurology and pediatrics at and chief of neurology at the Children's Hospital of Philadelphia.

=== Research in Multiple Sclerosis ===
Banwell initially took her position at the University of Toronto intending to focus on neuromuscular disease in children. When she inherited five patients with multiple sclerosis from a retiring physician, she reports that her focus shifted to pediatric demyelinating disease.

To better study a rare disease, Banwell created the Canadian Pediatric Demyelinating Disease Network in 2004, a multi-site network including all pediatric health-care facilities in Canada. This has allowed Banwell and co-investigators to better understand diagnosis, treatment, and comorbidities of pediatric demyelinating disease.

Diagnosis: Banwell has been instrumented in evaluating the use of the McDonald criteria - standardized criteria to diagnose multiple sclerosis through determination of dissemination of central nervous system demyelination in space and time - in pediatric multiple sclerosis. She has been the primary pediatric neurologist involved in international work to develop updates of the McDonald criteria for adults and children in 2010 and in 2017.

Treatment: While many medications have become available for the treatment of multiple sclerosis over the last three decades, testing in children has been challenging due to the rarity of pediatric multiple sclerosis and ethical considerations with the use of placebo. To facilitate and improve clinical trial design, Banwell created and currently chairs the International Pediatric Multiple Sclerosis Study Group. This allowed for the success of the PARADIGMS clinical trial, studying the safety and efficacy of fingolimod in a comparison with interferon beta-1a, and led to approval of fingolimod by the Food and Drug Administration for pediatric multiple sclerosis, the first approval of a medication for this indication.

Comorbidities: Banwell's work has shown that while children may recover physically from flares of multiple sclerosis, neuropsychological deficits may be apparent on testing, particularly in those who present at a younger age. This knowledge has changed how families are counseled and supported through the diagnosis of multiple sclerosis.

=== Acute Disseminated Encephalomyelitis, Neuromyelitis Optica and MOG Antibody Disease ===
Because demyelinating diseases in the pediatric population can be difficult to distinguish from each other, Banwell has worked to define and provide clinical guidelines for physicians working to delineate the diseases.

In 2015, Banwell was on the International Panel for NMO Diagnosis (IPND) to develop international consensus diagnostic criteria for what became termed neuromyelitis optica spectrum disorder (NMO-SD). She has also worked to determine the best treatment options for pediatric NMO-SD.

MOG antibody disease (MOGAD) was first described in the early 2000s as a subset of cases of neuromyelitis optica with antibodies to myelin oligocyte glycoprotein (MOG). Banwell and colleagues worked to characterize pediatric MOGAD to determine methods of diagnosis, treatment options, and prognosis.

== Awards and honors ==
- 1989-1991 Alpha Omega Alpha Honor Society
- 1997 American Academy of Neurology Resident Scholarship Award
- 1997 The President's Prize of the Canadian Congress of Neurological Sciences
- 2000 The Department of Neurology Research Award, Mayo Clinic
- 2002 Faculty Award for Clinical Excellence, The Hospital for Sick Children (Toronto)
- 2002 The William A. Hawke Award, Clinical Excellence in Teaching, The Hospital for Sick Children (Toronto)
- 2004 The William A. Hawke Award-Clinical Excellence in Teaching, The Hospital for Sick Children (Toronto)
- 2006 The William A. Hawke Award-Clinical Excellence in Teaching, The Hospital for Sick Children (Toronto)
- 2006 AAN Leadership Development Program (Selected), American Academy of Neurology
- 2007 Women Against Multiple Sclerosis - Woman of the Year Award
- 2008 Robert Salter Humanitarian Award Nominee-The Hospital for Sick Children (Toronto)
- 2012 The CANMEDS Award for Clinical Excellence, Division of Neurology, The Hospital for Sick Children (Toronto)
- 2012 The William A. Hawke Award-Clinical Excellence in Teaching, The Hospital for Sick Children (Toronto)
- 2015 The American Academy of Neurology Sydney Carter Lifetime Achievement Award in Child Neurology
- 2016 The Lady Barbara Colyton Prize for Autoimmune Research, Perelman School of Medicine, University of Pennsylvania
