= Queckenstedt's maneuver =

Clinical test, formerly used for diagnosing spinal stenosis

- Purpose: spinal stenosis

Queckenstedt's maneuver is a clinical test, formerly used for diagnosing spinal stenosis. The test is performed by placing the patient in the lateral decubitus position, thereafter the clinician performs a lumbar puncture. The opening pressure is measured. Then, the clinician's assistant compresses both jugular veins (if increased intracranial pressure is not suspected then one may exert pressure on both external jugular veins but usually pressure is first exerted on the abdomen, this pressure causes an engorgement of spinal veins and in turn rapidly increases cerebrospinal fluid pressure), which leads to a rise in the intracranial pressure. Given normal anatomy, the intracranial pressure will be reflected as a rapidly rising pressure measured from the lumbar needle, within 10–12 seconds. If there is a stenosis in the spine, there will be a damped, delayed response in the lumbar pressure, thus a positive Queckenstedt's maneuver. Nowadays this test has been made mostly superfluous by superior imaging modalities like MRI and CT.

The test is named after Hans Heinrich Georg Queckenstedt who described it in 1916.

== See also ==
- Tobey–Ayer test
