= Friedrich Meggendorfer =

German psychiatrist and neurologist (1880–1953)

- Born: 7 June 1880; Bad Aibling
- Died: 12 February 1953 (aged 72); Erlangen
- Known for: First describer of familial Creutzfeldt–Jakob disease
- Scientific career
- Fields: Psychiatry and Neurology
- Workplaces: Friedrichsberg Psychiatric Hospital, University of Erlangen

Friedrich Meggendorfer (June 7, 1880 – February 12, 1953) was a German psychiatrist and neurologist.

== Life ==
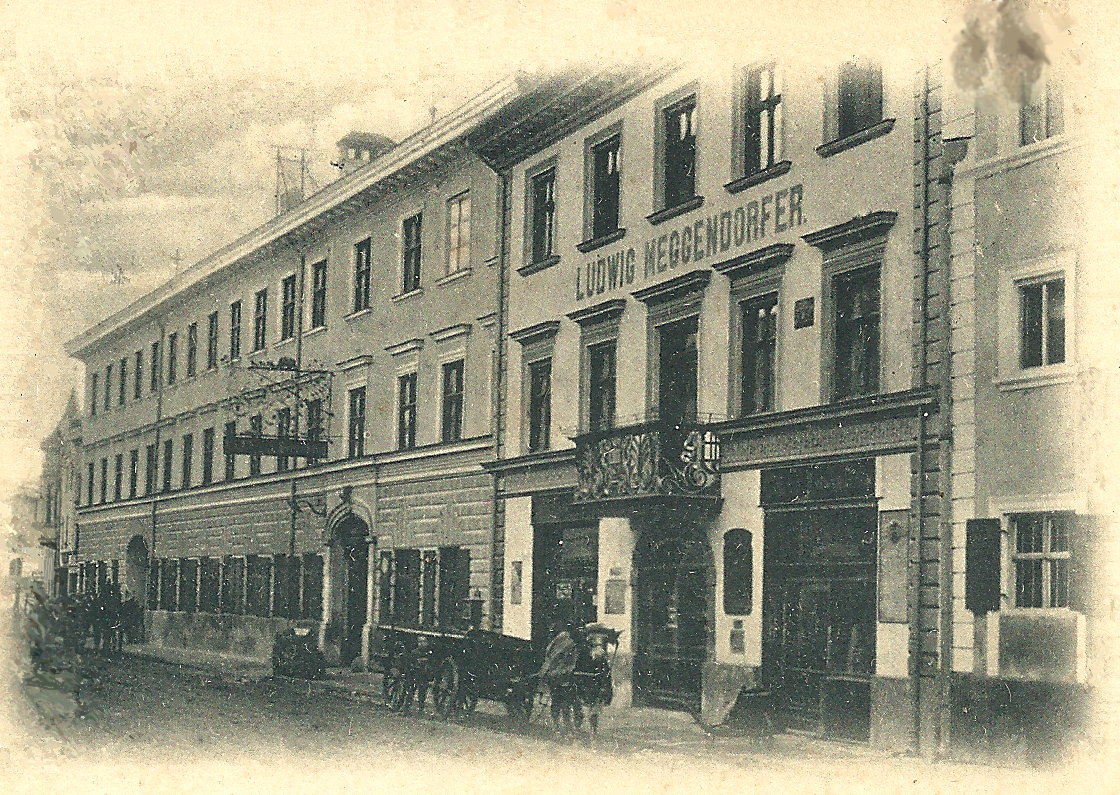
Friedrich Meggendorfer's parents' house in Bad Aibling (right)

Born in Bad Aibling, Bavaria, he was intended to take over the local colonial goods store of his ancestors. He enjoyed an excellent international education aimed at preparing him for this role. However, his life's goal has always been to become a physician, and finally, he had persuaded his father to agree and to sponsor medical studies. During World War I he was stationed in Turkey as a medical assistant of the German imperial navy. There he learnt much about the Turkish culture and was able to translate ancient Arabic medical works into German and the bible to Turkish, an effort that was lost later, when he narrowly escaped a sinking submarine.

== Scientific Work ==
Meggendorfer was an assistant to Emil Kraepelin (1856–1926) in Munich and Max Nonne (1861-1959) in Hamburg, and later worked at the Friedrichsberg Psychiatric Hospital in Hamburg. From 1934 to 1945 he was a professor and director of the psychiatric department at Erlangen.

His scientific activities were very versatile, ranging from moral insanity and dementia to epilepsy, progressive paralysis and Huntington's disease. Additionally, he was a recognized expert in forensic psychiatry.

Meggendorfer was a pioneer in electroconvulsive therapy and introduced this treatment method in Germany in 1939.

Secondary psychosis was an additional focus of his scientific work. As early as 1916 he described neurologic and psychiatric sequelae of pituitary neoplasms.

In 1930 he provided an early description of familial Creutzfeldt–Jakob disease in the "Backer family" of northern Germany. The case had already been reported in 1924 by Kirschbaum, but it was Meggendorfer who showed that the subject described by Kirschbaum was a member of a large kindred.

== Selected publications ==
- Gerichtliche Psychiatrie (Judicial Psychiatry), Carl Heymanns Verlag, Berlin 1931. DNB ID 58068489X
- "Elektrokrampfbehandlung der Psychosen". Deutsche Medizinische Wochenschrift. 66: 1155–1157. 1940. doi:10.1055/s-0028-1122348.
- Allgemeine und spezielle Therapie der Geistes- und Nervenkrankheiten (General and Special Treatment of Mental and Neurological Health), Wissenschaftliche Verlagsgesellschaft, Stuttgart 1950, DNB ID 453283039
