= Ricardo Ramina =

Brazilian surgeon

- Born: 21 August 1951 (age 75); Curitiba, Brazil
- Education: Pontifícia Universidade Católica do Paraná
- Awards: -Ordem Estadual do Pinheiro (Grau: Comendador)(2016) -Physician of the year (Médico Destaque do Ano, Academia Paranaense de Medicina) (2016) -SNOLA AWARD 2018 (2018)(2018)
- Scientific career
- Fields: Neurosurgery

Ricardo Ramina (born 21 August 1951) is a Brazilian neurosurgeon and university professor recognized for his contributions to complex skull base surgery, neuro-oncology, and cerebrovascular neurosurgery. His clinical and scientific work includes the treatment of vestibular schwannomas (acoustic neuromas)s, petroclival meningiomas, glomus jugulare tumors, cerebral aneurysms, and other complex neurological conditions. He has also contributed to the introduction and adoption of advanced neurosurgical techniques in South America.

== Biography ==
Ricardo Ramina was born in Curitiba, Brazil, and studied medicine at the Pontifícia Universidade Católica do Paraná. He subsequently completed his neurosurgical training under Professor Majid Samii in Hannover, Germany, where he later became a senior attending physician.

After returning to Brazil in 1986, he established his neurosurgical practice in Curitiba and later co-founded the Neurological Institute of Curitiba (INC), a specialized hospital dedicated to neurological and neurosurgical treatment, research, and medical education. According to figures released by the hospital, INC has the highest neurosurgical case volume of any Brazilian institution in the private health insurance sector (saúde suplementar). Its neurosurgical department performs around 1,000 elective procedures per year.

INC subsequently became an international training center of the World Federation of Neurosurgical Societies (WFNS). According to reports published in 2026, its neuro-oncology center was the only international neuro-oncology center outside of Europe certified by the German Cancer Society (Deutsche Krebsgesellschaft, DKG).

== Clinical and scientific contributions ==
Ramina's work has focused on the microsurgical treatment of complex brain and skull base lesions, as well as cerebrovascular diseases. His research on vestibular schwannomas spans several decades, addressing surgical approaches, facial nerve preservation, and hearing outcomes. His publications include research drawing on a surgical series of more than 700 patients treated between 1993 and 2022.

He has authored and edited several neurosurgical textbooks, including Samii's Essentials in Neurosurgery (2008; second edition 2014), Tumors of the Jugular Foramen (2017) and Tratado de Neurologia Clínica e Cirúrgica (2022). His scientific publications cover several areas of complex neurosurgery, particularly petroclival meningiomas, jugular foramen tumors, Vestibular schwannomas and cerebrovascular surgery.

His scientific contributions include research on advanced intraoperative technologies, particularly intraoperative magnetic resonance imaging (MRI), neurophysiological monitoring, and fluorescence-guided brain tumor surgery using 5-aminolevulinic acid (5-ALA). In 2026, he co-authored a retrospective study of 265 meningiomas evaluating fluorescence patterns as a potential adjunct to established methods for assessing tumor resection.

His clinical and academic activities have contributed to the adoption of advanced microsurgical and image-guided techniques and to the training of neurosurgeons in Brazil and internationally.

== Professional leadership and recognition ==
Ramina has held and continues to hold several leadership positions in Brazilian and international neurosurgical organizations. He currently serves as editor-in-chief of the Jornal Brasileiro de Neurocirurgia and as coordinator of neurosurgical residency education within the Brazilian Society of Neurosurgery (SBN). He is a former president of the Brazilian Academy of Neurosurgery and was also the founding secretary-general of the Brazilian Skull Base Society.

He serves as chairman and director of the WFNS Foundation Training Program at INC and has been involved in the activities of the Madjid Samii Society of International Neurosurgeons (MASSIN), including serving as president of its second international congress.

Ramina continues to serve as head of neurosurgery at INC and as a collaborating postgraduate professor at the Pontifícia Universidade Católica do Paraná. His academic and professional appointments have included postgraduate teaching positions, membership in the Deliberative Council of the Brazilian Society of neurosurgery, and involvement in the German and Chilean neurosurgical societies.

His professional recognition includes the Commander class Order (Order of the Pine Tree) from the State of Paraná, the SNOLA Award from the Society for Neuro-Oncology Latin America (2018), the title of Distinguished Citizen of Parana (2023), and the Order of the Municipal Light of Curitiba.
