= Daoud Mustafa Khalid =

Sudanese physician and neurologist

Professor Daoud Mustafa Khalid
- داؤود مصطفى خالد
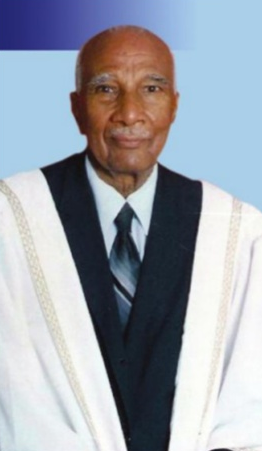
- Born: August 10, 1917; Tuti Island, Sudan
- Died: June 3, 2008 (aged 90)
- Education: Kitchener School of Medicine
- Occupation: Neurologist

Daoud Mustafa Khalid (Arabic: داؤود مصطفى خالد, 10 August 1917 – 3 June 2008) was a prominent Sudanese physician and neurologist. He was known as the "founding father of medicine in Sudan''.

== Life and career ==
=== Early life and education ===
Daoud Mustafa Khalid was born in Tuti Island, on 10 August 1917. His formal schooling started with Khalwa, in which he spent only two weeks, and Kuttab Tuti or Tuti elementary school in 1924 for one year before he moved to Kuttab Abu Zabad when his father moved to that town. He then moved to Um Rawwaba before they came back again to Tuti.

He had his intermediate schooling in Khartoum in the period 1928-31, and secondary school in Gordon Memorial College (the only secondary school in Sudan at that time) in the period 1932-1935. He joined Khartoum Kitchener School of Medicine in 1936, in which he spent 5 years. His outstanding educational career included Anatomy and Physiology prizes in 1937 and prizes in Medicine, Surgery, and Pathology on graduation with DKSM in 1940.

=== Career ===
Daoud joined Sudan Medical Services (currently Ministry of Health) as house officer in Khartoum and Omdurman hospitals in 1941-2. His internship lasted two years, eight months in Gynecology with Dr Hovel, eight months in medicine with Mr Humphreys, and eight months in surgery with Mr. Mayane. He worked as General Practitioner in Medani (1943–44) and once more in 1949 with Mr. Morris and Dr Coles. He worked as Senior Medical Officer in Merawi for eight months in 1944, Omdurman (1945–46), Sorceppo in Western Equatoria (1946–48), and Wau in Bahr El Ghazal in 1948.

In 1950, he was given a scholarship to specialize in medicine in the UK in Hammersmith Hospital and Institute for Higher Medical Studies in London, and in London Hospital, north London hospitals, and Queen Square Institute for Nervous Disorders. He acquired his MRCP in London in 1952.

On return to Sudan in 1952, he was appointed specialist in internal medicine in Atbara Hospital, and in 1953 he was transferred back to Khartoum to work as specialist in Omdurman Civil Hospital and part-time lecturer in Faculty of Medicine, University of Khartoum up to 1958, when he was appointed full-time Senior Lecturer. In 1960, he went back to Hammersmith Hospital and Institute of Postgraduate Medical Studies in London for further training for one year. In 1963, Daoud replaced HV Morgan as first Sudanese Head, Department of Medicine in the Faculty of Medicine, University of Khartoum. He maintained that post up to 1974. That department was part of the only medical school in the country, in the only university, and located in Khartoum Teaching Hospital, the main teaching hospital.

In 1965, Daoud was promoted to the status of medicine, Faculty of Medicine, University of Khartoum. In 1974-1975 he was Dean, FOM. He continued working as an internal medicine consultant and in Department of Medicine, University of Khartoum from 1976 up to 2006 on the request of UK. In 1967, with Hussin Suliman Abusalih, Khalid cofounded the Sudanese Society of Neurosciences (SSNS).

=== Death ===
Daoud died on 3 June 2008 at his home.

== Awards ==
- Prizes of anatomy, physiology pathology, medicine, and surgery at Kitchener School of Medicine (1936 - 1941).
- Honorary Doctorate in Sciences by University of Khartoum (1988).
- El Gomhoria medal (1978).
- Order of the Two Niles (1989).
- El Injaz Star medal (1990).
- “Martyr Elzubeir Mohamed Salih Prize” for distinguished and excellent scientific achievements (2001).
- Medal of Sciences and Arts, First Class Arabic Republic of Egypt (1983).
- Honorary Doctorate in Sciences by University of al-Jazirah (1998).

== Eponymous ==
- Daoud Mustafa Hall (Faculty of Medicine, University of Khartoum).
- Daoud Research Group (founded by Abbashar Hussein).
- Daoud Mustafa Hall (Tuti Island's Family Health Medical Center).
- Daoud Mustafa Khalid Ward (Omdurman Teaching Hospital).
