= Hans Heinrich Georg Queckenstedt =

German neurologist (1876–1918)

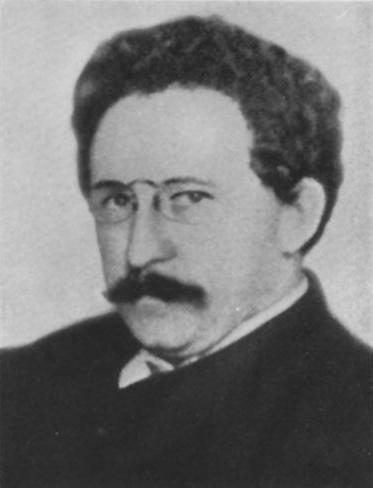
Hans Queckenstedt

Hans Heinrich Georg Queckenstedt (1876 in Leipzig-Reudnitz – 8 November 1918 in Bertrix) was a German neurologist remembered for describing Queckenstedt's phenomenon. He graduated from the University of Leipzig in 1900, having studied under Emil Kraepelin. He worked under Sigbert Josef Maria Ganser, and gained his doctorate in 1904. He worked in Rostock, and was habilitated as Privatdozent in 1913. He studied cerebrospinal fluid dynamics, noting the fluctuation of pressure with respiration. This led to experiments with the Valsalva manoeuvre and jugular vein pressure from which his eponymous test was published. He took part in the First World War as a medical officer and died shortly before the armistice due to an accident.
