= Robert Foster Kennedy =

American medical researcher

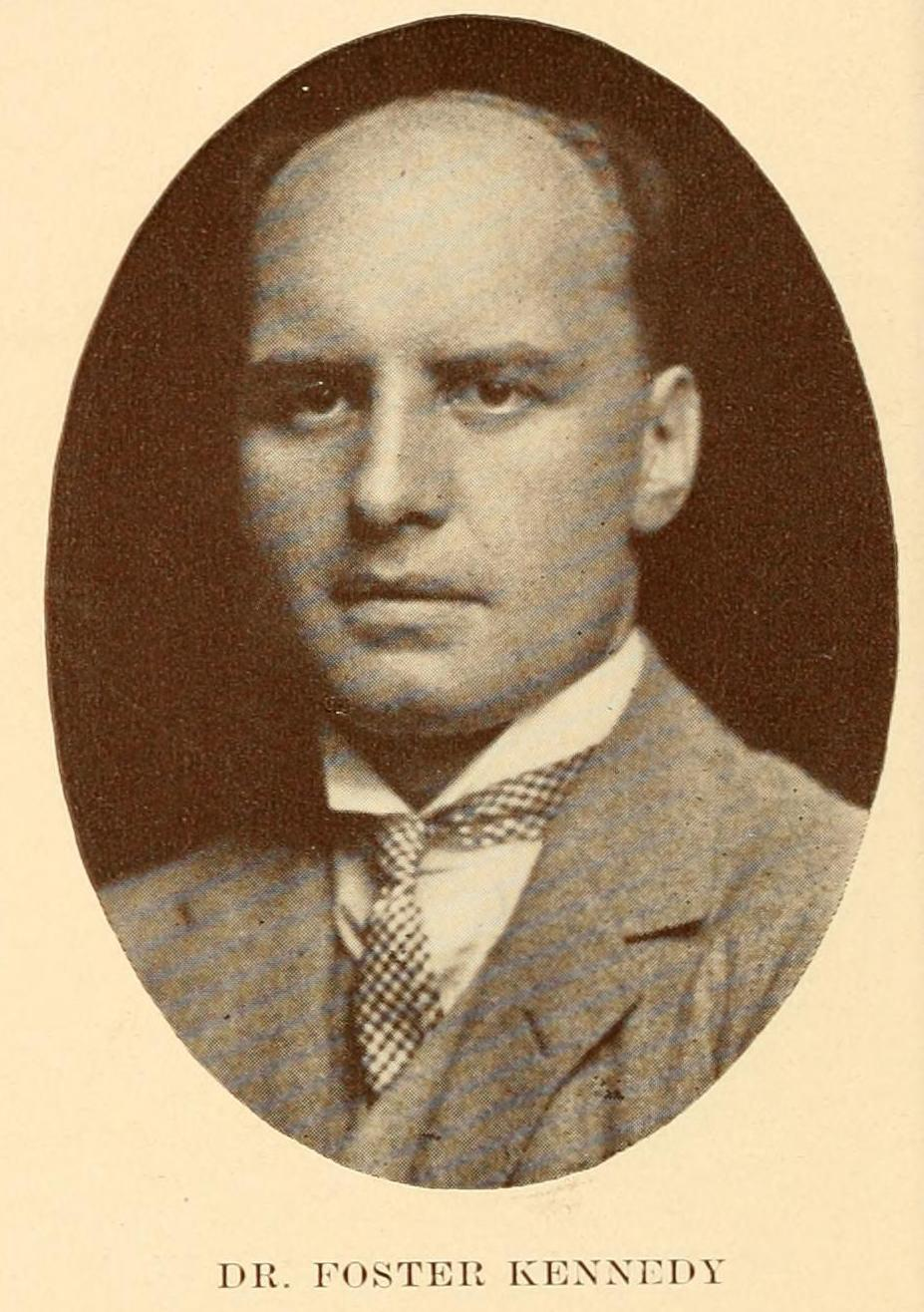
Robert Foster Kennedy

Dr Robert Foster Kennedy MD FRSE (7 February 1884 – 1952) was an Irish-born neurologist largely working in America. He gives his name to Foster-Kennedy syndrome, the Kaplan-Kennedy test and Kennedy's Syndrome. He was one of the first medical doctors to use electroconvulsive treatment for mental conditions and one of the first to recognise and define shell shock in the First World War.

== Life ==
He was born in Belfast on 7 February 1884. He was the youngest child of William Archer Kennedy and his wife Hester ("Hessie") Dill. Hester was the daughter of Robert Foster Dill, Professor of Midwifery at Queen's College, Belfast and also Belfast City Coroner. Robert's father took the whole family to Poland for business purposes. During this time Hester died. William stayed in Poland and sent the children to live at Fisherwick Place in Belfast with Prof Dill, their grandfather. When he in turn died in 1893 the family moved to Bangor.

His early education was as a boarder at the Royal School Dungannon.

Foster Kennedy studied medicine at Belfast University and took his final exams at the Royal University of Ireland/Dublin. After graduating in 1906 he worked at the National Hospital, Queen's Square (London) where he was influenced by brilliant neuroscientists such as Sir William Gowers, John Hughlings Jackson, Sir Victor Horsley and Sir Henry Head.

Failing to find suitable work in Ireland he left for the United States in 1910, having successfully found a post at the recently established New York Neurological Institute. The outbreak of World War I brought him back to Europe where he founded a French Military Hospital at Ris-Orangis, and subsequently formally served in the Royal Army Medical Corps. In 1915 he visited Chateau d'Annel, another front line hospital run by Julia Catlin Park Taufflieb. He returned to New York in 1915 but rejoined the front line with the Harvard Surgical Unit near Boulogne when America joined the war. Working close to the front line he had several narrow escapes, and was made a Chevalier de la Légion d'honneur by France.

After the war he worked in the Bellevue Hospital in New York City, where one of his colleagues was Samuel Kinnier Wilson. Foster Kennedy became professor of neurology at Cornell University and in 1940 was elected president of the "American Neurological Association".

He died at Bellevue Hospital in New York City on 7 January 1952 from problems relating to blood circulation.

== Eugenics ==
Kennedy supported widespread eugenic sterilization, castration and euthanasia of what he termed "mental defectives". He was awarded with honorary degree of University of Heidelberg at 550 anniversary in 1936.

At the 1941 annual meeting of the American Psychiatric Association, he called for the extermination of incurably severely retarded children over the age of five. His goal was to relieve "the utterly unfit" and "nature's mistakes" of the "agony of living" and to save their parents and the state the cost of caring for them. He concluded, "So the place for euthanasia, I believe, is for the completely hopeless defective; nature's mistake; something we hustle out of sight, which should not have been seen at all" (p. 15).

"Foster Kennedy, while professor of neurology at Cornell University in New York, argued that all children with proven mental retardation ("feeblemindedness") over the age of five should be put to death."

== Family ==
Kennedy married twice. He divorced his first wife Isabel in 1938. In 1940 he married Katherine Caragol y San Abria.
