= Carlos Pardo-Villamizar =

Carlos A. Pardo-Villamizar, also known simply as Carlos Pardo, is a professor of neurology and pathology at Johns Hopkins University School of Medicine, as well as the director of the Johns Hopkins Transverse Myelitis Center. His area of expertise is immunopathology and the neuroimmune system. He is currently leading a project that investigates the role of neuroglial dysfunction in HIV infection and drug abuse, and has also published research concluding that the brains of autistic individuals exhibit neuroglial activation, loss of neurons in the Purkinje layer and neuroinflammation "in the same regions [of the brain] that appear to have excess white matter".

== Education ==
Dr. Pardo is a native of Colombia, and completed his training at Universidad Industrial de Santander in Bucaramanga in 1984. He went on to complete two residencies: one at the Instituto Neurologico de Colombia in 1989 in clinical neurology, and another at Johns Hopkins in neurology, which he completed in 1999.

== Autism research ==
Pardo's 2005 study, published in the Annals of Neurology, has been cited by many promoters of alternative autism therapies, such as Dan Rossignol, to justify treating children "with a blood product typically reserved for people with severe immune system disorders like the one known as bubble boy disease". Pardo himself has stated, "We were concerned that the study would raise a lot of controversy and be misused. We were right." In addition, Pardo's team wrote an online primer accompanying the study's publication in which they stated that "THERE IS NO indication for using anti-inflammatory medications in patients with autism." He also noted, at the time of the study's publication, that "it is not yet clear whether the inflammation is a consequence of disease or a cause of it, or both", and that it was also not yet clear "whether it [immune activation] is destructive or beneficial, or both, to the developing brain".

== Selected publications ==
- Keswani, S. C.; Pardo, C. A.; Cherry, C. L.; Hoke, A.; McArthur, J. C. (2002). "HIV-associated sensory neuropathies". AIDS. 16 (16): 2105–2117. doi:10.1097/00002030-200211080-00002. PMID 12409731. S2CID 35317454.
- Krishnan, C.; Kaplin, A. I.; Pardo, C. A.; Kerr, D. A.; Keswani, S. C. (2006). "Demyelinating disorders: Update on transverse myelitis". Current Neurology and Neuroscience Reports. 6 (3): 236–243. doi:10.1007/s11910-006-0011-1. PMID 16635433. S2CID 23166235.
- Pardo, C. A.; Eberhart, C. G. (2007). "The Neurobiology of Autism". Brain Pathology. 17 (4): 434–447. doi:10.1111/j.1750-3639.2007.00102.x. PMC 8095519. PMID 17919129.
