= Max Nonne =

German neurologist (1861–1959)

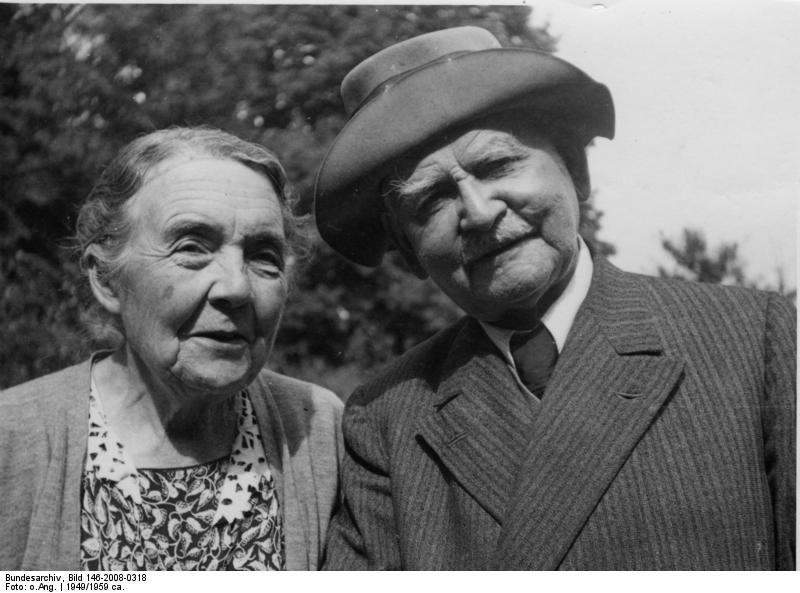
Henny and Max Nonne (1949 photo).

Max Nonne (13 January 1861, Hamburg – 12 August 1959, Hamburg) was a German neurologist.

== Biography ==
Max Nonne received his early education at the Gelehrtenschule des Johanneums in Hamburg, and later studied medicine at the universities of Heidelberg, Freiburg, and Berlin, obtaining his doctorate in 1884. After graduation, he served as an assistant in the Heidelberg medical clinic under Wilhelm Heinrich Erb (1840-1921) and in the surgical clinic in Kiel under Johannes Friedrich August von Esmarch (1823-1908), then in 1889 returned to Hamburg as a neurologist. During the same year, he became head physician in the department of internal medicine at the Red Cross Hospital. In 1896 he was appointed director of neurology at Eppendorf Hospital, Hamburg.

Nonne became a titular professor of neurology in 1913, and in 1919 began teaching classes in neurology at the newly founded University of Hamburg, where in 1925 he became professor ordinarius. Here he worked with Alfons Maria Jakob (1884-1931).

Nonne was one of the four physicians asked to investigate Vladimir Ilich Lenin during the Russian leaders' final disease.

== See also ==
- Friedrich Meggendorfer

== Associated eponyms ==
- Nonne-Apelt reaction: Sensitive method for demonstrating fibrin-globulin in liquor cerebrospinalis.
- Nonne-Milroy-Meige disease: Chronic familial lymphoedema of the limbs.

== Selected writings ==
- Syphilis und Nervensystem. Berlin, 1902; fifth edition – 1924. (Translated into English and Spanish).
- Diagnose und Therapie der syphilogenen Erkrankungen des Zentralnervensystems. Halle, 1913. 47 pages.
