= Pratibha Singhi =

Indian pediatric neurologist

- Born: 1951 (age 74–75); Ajmer, India
- Education: Jawaharlal Nehru Medical College; All India Institute of Medical Sciences
- Known for: Development of pediatric neurology and neurodevelopmental care in India; President of the International Child Neurology Association
- Awards: 2023 Smt. Gayatri Jaipuria Award for Women's Excellence in Medicine and Healthcare, 2022 Frank Ford Award, 2013 Dr S Janaki Memorial Oration, 1973 President of India medal
- Scientific career
- Fields: Neurology, pediatrics, development
- Workplaces: Post Graduate Institute of Medical Education and Research (PGIMER); Medanta; The Great Ormond Street Hospital, London, UK

Pratibha Singhi is an Indian pediatric neurologist. As the first pediatric neurologist in the country, she built the fields of pediatric neurology and neurodevelopment there. She is head of pediatric neurology at Amrita Hospital, Faridabad. Formerly she was director of pediatric neurology and neurodevelopment at Medanta, and chief of pediatric neurology and neurodevelopment in the department of pediatrics, Post Graduate Institute of Medical Education and Research (PGIMER), Chandigarh.

In 2020 she was elected the President of the International Child Neurology Association, with a 4-year term 2022-2026.

== Early life and education ==
Singhi was born in Ajmer, India. She graduated from the Jawaharlal Nehru Medical College in 1973, winning many awards, including the President of India Medal.

== Career and research ==
Singhi studied Pediatrics in California and worked in Jamaica before returning to India. She later trained in Pediatric Neurology at The Johns Hopkins Hospital and Kennedy Krieger Institute Baltimore, In 1983, Singhi joined the Post Graduate Institute of Medical Education and Research (PGIMER) in Chandigarh and began developing a pediatric neurology program. In 1985 she co-founded PRAYAAS, the Rehabilation Center for Handicapped Children, with her mentor, Dr. B.N.S. Walia. PRAYAAS has evolved into a multidisciplinary center serving children with cerebral palsy, autistic spectrum disorder and other neurodevelopmental disorders.

Without options to learn about pediatric neurology in India, Singhi traveled to Johns Hopkins Medical School and the Kennedy Krieger Institute, to the Royal Hospital for Children and Young People, and to the Royal Victoria Infirmary for additional work and training.

In India she built the fields of pediatric neurology and neurodevelopment as the first pediatric neurologist in the country. She served as the president of the Association of Child Neurology India and Vice President of the India Academy of Cerebral Palsy.

Singhi has an h-index of 36, having published more than 500 papers in peer-reviewed journals. Her primary areas of research have been neurological infectious disease, epilepsy, and neurodevelopmental disabilities. For four consecutive years beginning in 2020, she has been ranked among the top 2% of scientists in the world in an analysis by John Ioannidis at Stanford University.

== Honors ==
- 2013: Dr. S. Janaki Memorial Oration by the National Academy of Medical Sciences for recognition of outstanding contributions in the field of neurological disorders
- 2015: Research Paper of the Year, British Medical Journal South Asia
- 2021: Dr. K. C. Chaudhuri & Dr. Amala Chaudhuri Lifetime Achievement Award from the Indian Journal of Pediatrics
- 2022 Frank Ford Lifetime Achievement Award Recipient, International Child Neurology Association
- 2023: Sitaram Jaipuria Foundation Award for Excellence in Medicine

== Select publications ==
- Jauhari, P; Singhi, P; Sankhyan, N; Malhi, P; Vyas, S; Khandelwal, N (2018). "A Comparison of Spastic Diplegia in Term and Preterm-Born Children". J Child Neurol. 33: 333–339. doi:10.1177/0883073817754175. PMID 29464974..
- Dalwai, S; Unni, J; Kalra, V; Singhi, P; Shrivastava, L; Nair, MK (2017). "Consensus Statement of the Indian Academy of Pediatrics on Evaluation and Management of Attention Deficit Hyperactivity Disorder". Indian Pediatr. 54: 481–488. doi:10.1007/s13312-017-1052-z. PMID 28368271..
- Saini, AG; Padmanabha, H; Attri, S; Singhi, P (2017). "Malar rash in classical homocystinuria". BMJ Case Rep. 2017: bcr–2017–220296. doi:10.1136/bcr-2017-220296. PMC 5747660. PMID 28473367.
- Dhawan, SR; Gupta, A; Singhi, P; Sankhyan, N; Malhi, P; Khandelwal, N (2016). "Predictors of Neurological Outcome of Tuberculous Meningitis in Childhood: A Prospective Cohort Study From a Developing Country". J Child Neurol. 31: 1622–1627. doi:10.1177/0883073816668112. PMID 27655469..
- Saini, AG; Sankhyan, N; Vyas, S; Laugel, V; Calmels, N; Singhi, P (2016). "Teaching NeuroImages: The syndrome of cutaneous photosensitivity, growth failure, and basal ganglia calcification". Neurology. 87: e56-7. doi:10.1212/WNL.0000000000002949. PMID 27502967.
