= Édouard Brissaud =

French physician (1852–1909)

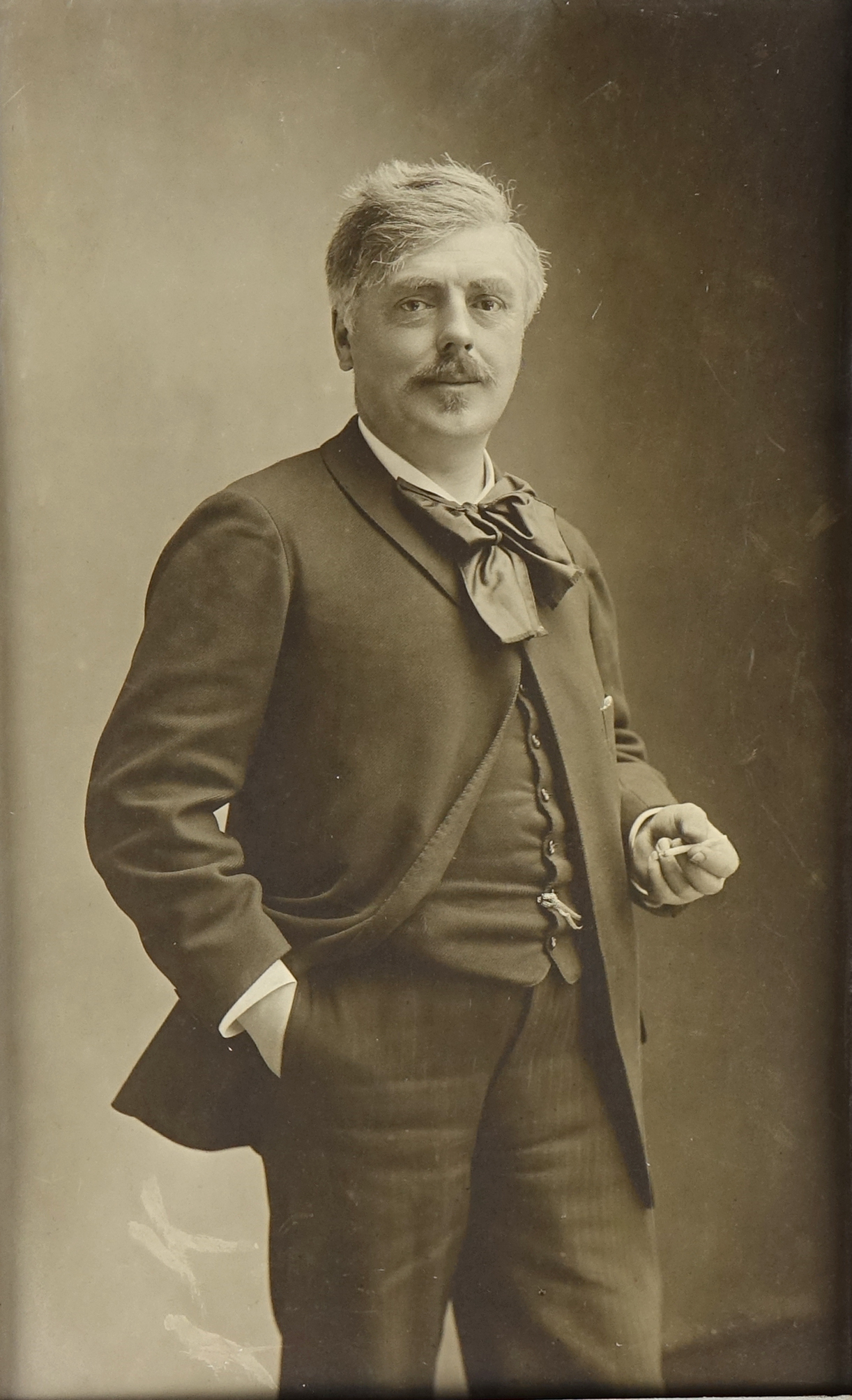
- Édouard Brissaud by Nadar
- Born: 15 April 1852; Besançon
- Died: 20 December 1909 (aged 57)
- Occupations: physician pathologist
- Employer: Pitié-Salpêtrière Hospital

Édouard Brissaud (15 April 1852, Besançon – 20 December 1909) was a French physician and pathologist. He was taught by Jean Martin Charcot at Pitié-Salpêtrière Hospital. He had interests in a number of medical disciplines including motion disturbances, anatomy, neurology and psychiatry. He died of a brain tumour, aged 57.

He has been awarded a large number of eponyms many of which are now rarely used and some were not the dominant eponym in use.

- Bourneville-Brissaud disease – tuberous sclerosis. He studied one of the earliest diagnosed cases with Désiré-Magloire Bourneville in 1881.
- Brissaud's scoliosis – a form of scoliosis giving "a list of the lumbar part of the spine away from the affected side in sciatica" (Dorland's Medical Dictionary). Described in 1895.
- Brissaud's disease – Tourette syndrome. He gave a detailed description in 1896.
- Brissaud's infantilism – infantile myxedema (hypothyroidism). Described in 1907.
- Brissaud's reflex – a contraction of the tensor fasciae latae (a thigh muscle) on tickling the sole of the foot.
- Brissaud-Sicard syndrome – is "hemiparesis and contralateral hemifacial spasm resulting from a pontine lesion" (Stedman's Medical Dictionary). Described in 1908. Named in conjunction with neurologist Jean-Athanase Sicard.

== Papers ==
- Bourneville D, Brissaud É (1881). "Encéphalite ou sclérose tubéreuse des circonvolutions cérébrales". Archives de neurologie. 1: 390–412.
- Brissaud É (1895). Leçons sur les maladies nerveuses. Paris: Masson. pp. 469–501.
- Brissaud É (1896). "La chorée variable des dégenerés". Revue neurologique, Paris. 4: 417–431.
- Brissaud É (1907). "L'infantilisme vrai". Nouvelle iconographie de la Salpêtrière, Paris. 20: 1–17.
- Brissaud É, Sicard JA (1908). "L'hémispasme facial altern". Presse Médicale. 16: 1234–236.

== See also ==
- A Clinical Lesson at the Salpêtrière – 1887 group tableau portrait by André Brouillet
- History of Tourette syndrome
- Timeline of tuberous sclerosis
