= Bant (Omdurman) =

Bant بانت
- District

Arabic transcription(s)
  - Common: بانت
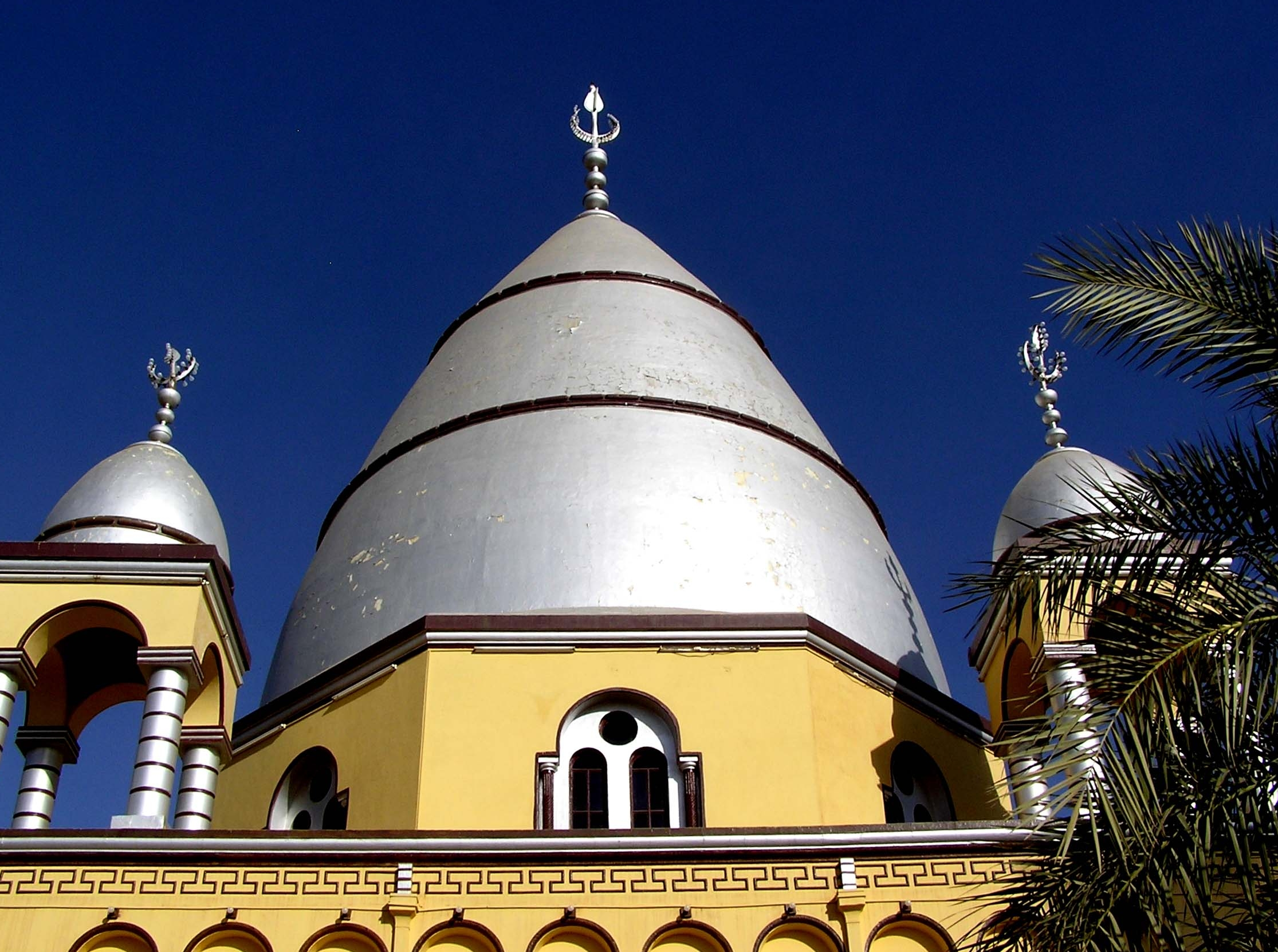

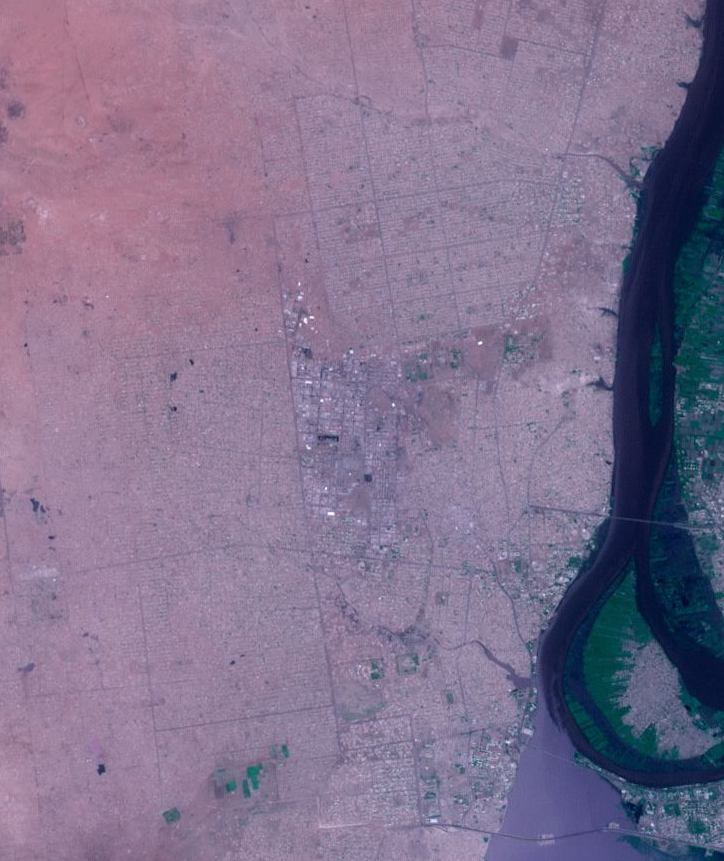
- Map of Bant (inset: map of Omdurman)

- Location of Bant in Sudan
- Coordinates: 15°39′N 32°29′E
- Country: Sudan
- Governorate: Khartoum
- Time zone: UTC+3 (East Africa Time)
  - Summer (DST): UTC+3

Bant (Arabic: بانت / transliterated: Ba‛ant) is an affluent district in Omdurman city, Khartoum State, Sudan. south-western part of the ancient city of Omdurman.

== Geography ==
Borders of Bant, from the east by Almorada Street, a two-way street extends from north to south, and Alarbeen Street which extends from north to south divided the district into Bant East and Bant West. It is bordered on the south by Alawda street adjacent to the military area, and form the north Abukdok and officers district . Its borders ended at Almutamer Secondary School for boys Corner.

== History ==
Although the district is one of the Urban of the new residential districts, but it was founded in the late 1940s and early 1950s of the past century after the central government distributed plots of land to the population of Almorda district, as compensation for what they had lost as a result of residential land in Architectural planning processes in the Postal area and Almorda Street.

== Etymology ==
There was a lot of stories about the name which was given after:

- The story which was closer to the truth that Bant has been created in a beautiful way and houses which in it were built aesthetically, streets well organized, and the first started construction there is Adlan Beah, who built his house during the autumn rainy season and echoed by those who followed him in the construction in the area is a «Alrejal Bant».
- There was another story, which says that the name of the Bant is fully was (Alrejal Bant), and so named because when housing land distributed in the region on which Bant today, was barren nothing ther? non-wild plants and people were saying, "Do not build there only a brave man. "In reference to the courage and fearlessness of construction in an empty region non-inhabited. Thus called on the place name of Alrejal Bant.
- There is a story that says the area was a space to come flocks of hawks and eagles from the dimension, was said to «Sogoor Bant» There is now an area neighborhood in Bant known district of eagles (Sogoor) at the west side of Almorada sports club.

== Climate ==
Bant features a hot desert climate, with only the months of July and August seeing significant precipitation. Bant averages a little over 155 millimetres (6.1 in) of precipitation per year. Based on annual mean temperatures, Omdurman is one of the hottest major cities in the world. Temperatures may exceed 53 °C (127 °F) in mid-summer.

Its average annual high temperature is 37.1 °C (99 °F), with six months of the year seeing an average monthly high temperature of at least 38 °C (100 °F). Furthermore, none of its monthly average high temperatures falls below 30 °C (86 °F). This is something not seen in other major cities with hot desert climates. Temperatures cool off considerably during the night, with Omdurman's lowest average low temperature of the year just above 15 °C (59 °F).

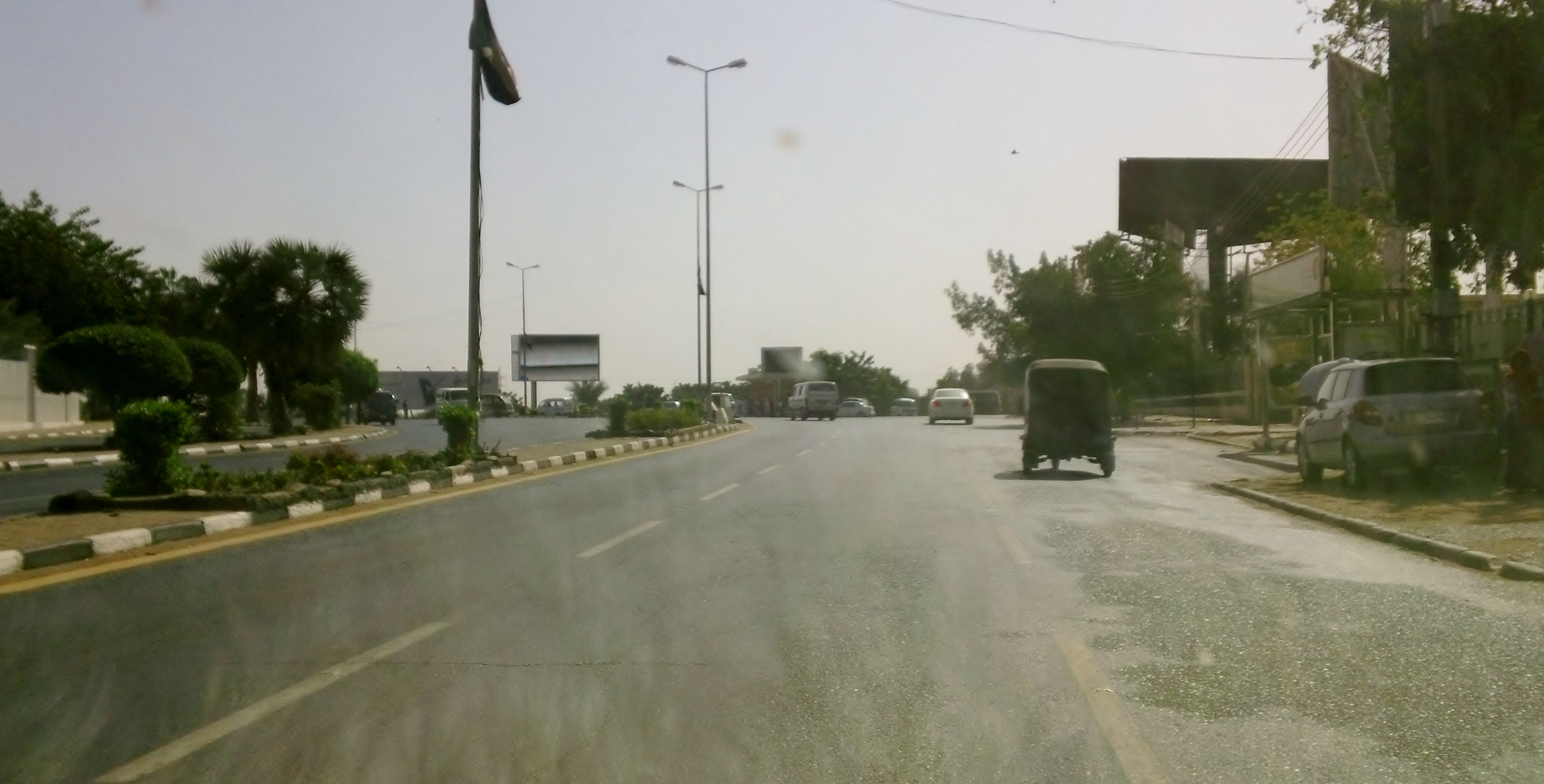
Almorda Street

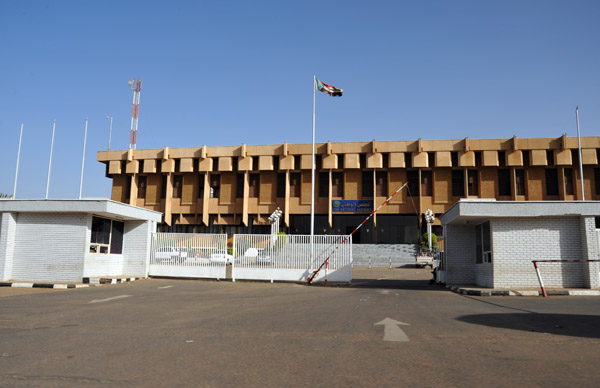
The National Assembly of the Republic of Sudan

== Famous places and buildings ==
- Building Palace of Youth and Children Bant East which was established during the rule of former President Jaafar Nimeiri.
- Masjid Al-Nilin

== Sport ==
- Al-Mourada football club. Their home stadium is Al-Mourada Stadium located in the Mourada district.

== Education ==
There are several educational institutions in Omdurman. Some of the notable schools include:

- Elementary Schools and High Schools:
- Al-Mo’tamr higher secondary school in Bant East (Sharq).
- Mosa Aldaw Hajoj higher secondary school in Bant west.
- Aldaw Hajoj intermediate school Bant East.
- AlRashad basis School for boys Bant East.
- Bant East basis Girls School.
- Abuanjh basis Girls School Bant west.
- Ahmed Nasser medium School for Girls Bant west.
