= Samia Maimani =

Saudi Arabian physician and academic (1955 – 1997)

Samia Abdel Rahim Maimani
- سامية عبد الرحيم ميمني
- Born: 1955; Saudi Arabia
- Died: 20 October 1997 (aged 41–42); United States
- Cause of death: Assassination
- Citizenship: Saudi
- Education: King Faisal University College of Medicine; Charles R. Drew University of Medicine and Science
- Known for: Maimani aneurysm clip applier and remover for use with neuroendoscopes and steriotactic systems
- Scientific career
- Fields: neurosurgery

Samia Abdel Rahim Maimani (1955 – 20 October 1997) was a Saudi university professor, inventor, physician and neurosurgeon. She was an alumna of King Faisal University College of Medicine and Charles R. Drew University of Medicine and Science. She was the first Saudi woman to specialize in neurosurgery. She obtained patents in several medical fields.

Maimani was born in Saudi Arabia. Her father, Abd al-Rahim Maimani, had an accident that broke his skull, killing him on the spot.

Maimani's inventions include:

- The nervous relaxation system, which are units of computer simulators, through which you can control nerves, especially paralyzed brain nerves, to move and heal them.
- The gong device that can control neurons at a specific time.
- A device called Mars that detects cancer in the early stages of infection.

Her inventions received patents.

== Murder ==
According to California State Police reports, Maimani was found suffocated in her apartment on 20 October 1997. Her body was found inside a broken refrigerator on the street. As indicated in the case file, the guard of the building in which Maimani lived was arrested based on crime scene fingerprints. The guard was sentenced to life imprisonment, although he denied his connection to the crime even after the verdict was issued. Maimani's furniture, money, jewelry, and medical research and patents had disappeared from her apartment.
