= Brissaud's reflex =

Clinical sign

Brissaud's reflex is a clinical sign in which stroking the sole of the foot elicits contraction of tensor fasciae latae. This can occur when there is no movement of the toes, and is part of the extensor plantar response (Babinski's sign).

The sign is named after Édouard Brissaud.
