= Foster Kennedy syndrome =

- Other names: Gowers–Paton–Kennedy syndrome, Kennedy's phenomenon, Kennedy's syndrome
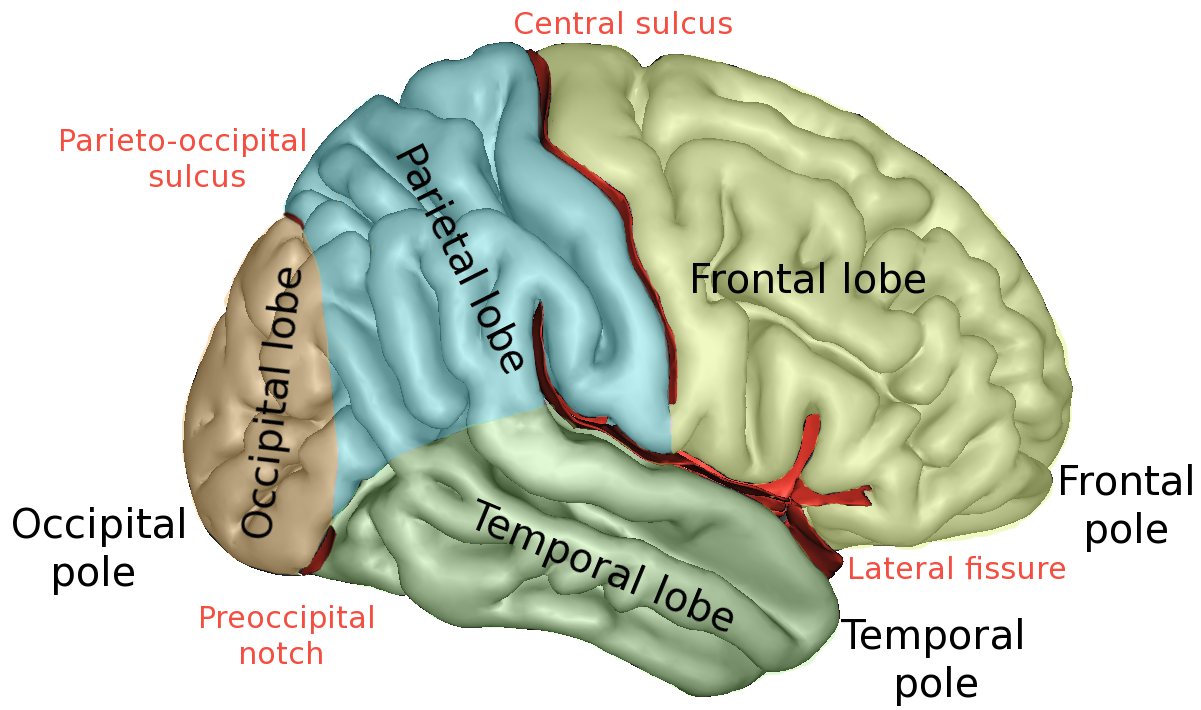
- Frontal lobe (on the right)
- Specialty: Neurology

Foster Kennedy syndrome is a constellation of findings associated with tumors of the frontal lobe.

Although Foster Kennedy syndrome is sometimes called "Kennedy syndrome", it should not be confused with Kennedy disease, or spinal and bulbar muscular atrophy, which is named after William R. Kennedy.

Pseudo-Foster Kennedy syndrome is defined as one-sided optic atrophy with papilledema in the other eye but with the absence of a mass.

== Presentation ==
The syndrome is defined as the following changes:

- Optic atrophy in the ipsilateral eye
- Disc edema in the contralateral eye
- Central scotoma (loss of vision in the middle of the visual fields) in the ipsilateral eye

The presence of anosmia (loss of smell) ipsilateral to the eye demonstrating optic atrophy was historically associated with this syndrome, but is now understood to not strictly be associated with all cases.

This syndrome is due to optic nerve compression, olfactory nerve compression, and increased intracranial pressure (ICP) secondary to a mass (such as meningioma or plasmacytoma, usually an olfactory groove meningioma). There are other symptoms present in some cases such as nausea and vomiting, memory loss and emotional lability (i.e., frontal lobe signs).

== Diagnosis ==
Brain tumor can be visualized very well on CT scan, but MRI gives better detail and is the preferred study. Clinical localization of brain tumors may be possible by virtue of specific neurologic deficits or symptom patterns. Tumor at the base of the frontal lobe produces inappropriate behavior, optic nerve atrophy on the side of the tumor, and papilledema of the contralateral eye; anosmia on the side of the tumor may be found in certain cases of progressive disease.

== Treatment ==
The treatment, and therefore prognosis, varies depending upon the underlying tumour. While awaiting surgical removal, treat any increased intracranial pressure with high-dose steroids (i.e., dexamethasone).

== History ==
The syndrome was first extensively noted by Robert Foster Kennedy in 1911, an Irish neurologist, who spent most of his career working in the United States. However, the first mention of the syndrome came from a William Gowers in 1893. Schultz–Zehden described the symptoms again in 1905. A later description was written by Wilhelm Uhthoff in 1915.
