= Robert Wheeler Rand =

American neurosurgeon (1923–2013)

Robert Wheeler Rand (January 28, 1923 – December 14, 2013), was an American neurosurgeon, inventor, and Professor of Neurosurgery in the Department of Neurosurgery at the University of California Los Angeles (UCLA) from 1953 to 1989.

== Early life and education ==
Robert W. Rand, the only son of Carl Wheeler Rand, M.D. and Katherine Humphrey Rand, was born in Los Angeles, California on January 28, 1923. His father, Dr. Carl W. Rand, a respected neurosurgeon, was trained under Harvey Cushing, known to be the "father of modern neurosurgery."

Robert W. Rand followed in his father's footsteps and became a nationally and internationally known neurosurgeon and Professor of Neurosurgery at UCLA. He received undergraduate training at Harvard College (1940–42) and the UCLA Naval Training Program (1942–44), graduated from the University of Southern California School of Medicine (M.D., 1947) and completed his internship, assistant residency, and residency in neurological surgery at the University of Michigan in Ann Arbor. He also earned an M.S. in Surgery (1951) and a Ph.D. in Anatomy (1952) from the University of Michigan.

== Professional career ==
Over the course of his career, Rand authored approximately 250 scientific papers and chapters, presented almost four hundred scientific lectures around the world, and wrote and edited several books, including: Intraspinal Tumors in Childhood (1960), Microsurgical Neuroanatomy Atlas (1967), Cryosurgery (1968), and three editions of Microneurosurgery (1969, 1978, 1985). He also holds a number of patents.

He created and performed numerous previously undescribed surgeries on the brain including a new approach to the removal of acoustic tumors that spared vital nerves for facial muscle function which had been routinely sacrificed in older techniques. Rand personally performed over 2,000 surgeries for the treatment of Parkinson's Disease in which he used cryosurgery and selectively froze portions of the thalamus. Tremors were either relieved substantially or completely eliminated in many cases. Rand also utilized cryosurgery to treat thousands of patients with tumors of the pituitary gland via a procedure termed Stereotactic Cryohypopyhysectomy.

In 1957, he and his colleague Theodore Kurze were the first to introduce the surgical microscope into neurosurgical procedures. In the years that followed, the use of the microscope became ubiquitous in neurosurgery, giving rise to a new subspecialty within the field: microneurosurgery.

In 1975, in conjunction with the scientists at the Stanford Linear Accelerator Center (SLAC) in Palo Alto, California, Rand developed a Superconducting Magnet which would hold a liquid silicone-iron compound in position deep within the brain while it solidified, thus obliterating blood vessel malformations which could not be accessed by traditional surgical methods. This technique, called Stereotactic Ferrothrombosis of Aneurysms with a Super-conduction Magnet, was groundbreaking for its time.

Through his close relationship with its inventor, Lars Leksell, Rand brought the first Gamma Knife into the United States and gifted it to UCLA School of Medicine in 1979. The Gamma Knife offers highly selective radiation to pinpoint targets in the brain thus avoiding surrounding tissue damage. Gamma Knife treatments are now commonplace throughout the United States. Dr. Rand also subsequently conceived and designed the Cobalt Scalpel to use the same principles of highly focused radiation for treatment of cancers outside the brain, such as prostate cancer, sparing surrounding normal tissues from injury.

In the early 1980s, at the Jet Propulsion Laboratory in Pasadena, California, Rand was assisted by physicists in creating the instrumentation for another novel procedure he called Thermomagnetic Surgery. In this treatment, cancerous organs such as the uterus or kidney would be selectively heated and destroyed without damaging the surrounding tissues. The premise of this approach was that it would prevent the spread of cancerous cells into the body or blood stream when the malignant organs were removed surgically because the cancers were already dead prior to their removal.

In 1987, Rand and his son Richard P. Rand published the first reports of Cryolumpectomy for Carcinoma of the Breast in the journal Surgery, Gynecology and Obstetrics. Years later, this has become a standard procedure in treating patients with breast cancer.

His creativity and professional accomplishments led Rand to be awarded a Professional Achievement Award from UCLA in 1975 and a Lifetime Achievement Award from the International College of Surgeons in 1995.

== Legacy ==
In 1949, Rand married Helen Louise Pierce. They had two sons, Carl Wheeler II and Richard Pierce.

After his death in 2013, Rand's family donated a collection of his manuscripts, publications, and research materials to the UCLA Biomedical Library where they remain available to those who continue to advance research in the field of neuroscience.
