= Donald Calne =

Canadian neurologist

- Born: May 4, 1936 (age 90); London, England
- Education: University of Oxford
- Awards: Killam Research Prize, Starr Award, Officer of the Order of Canada, fellow of the Royal Society of Canada, Hon degree UBC
- Scientific career
- Fields: Neurology
- Workplaces: Retired Professor Emeritus

Donald Brian Calne, OC FRSC (born May 4, 1936) is a Canadian neurologist who is a leading Parkinson's disease researcher.

== Biography ==
Born in London, England, he received his Bachelor of Arts, Bachelor of Science and Doctor of Medicine degrees from the University of Oxford. He worked in England and at the National Institute of Health in Bethesda, Maryland until 1980. From 1981 to 2001, he was the Director of the Neurodegenerative Disorders Centre at the University of British Columbia and a professor of neurology. He is a member of the National Parkinson Foundation's Scientific Advisory Board.

In 1998, he was made an Officer of the Order of Canada. In 2001, he was made a Fellow of the Royal Society of Canada. In 2002, he received an Honorary Doctor of Science degree from the University of British Columbia. He was a member of the Steering Committee of the 1st World Parkinson Congress (WPC) in 2006.

He was the first researcher to use L dopa in the UK and the first to show how to use synthetic dopamine to treat Parkinson's disease. He has shown that latent damage occurs in the brain even before the symptoms of Parkinson's disease appears.

In 1999, he published the book, Within Reason: Rationality and Human Behavior.

He married Susan M. Wigfield, who has been a nurse and co-ordinator at the UBC hospital’s movement disorders clinic. They worked with people with Parkinson's disease together for 25 years.

== See also ==
- List of neuroscientists
- List of neurologists

== Sources ==
- Profile
- Elizabeth Lumley (2004). Canadian Who's Who. University of Toronto Press. p. 199. ISBN 978-0-8020-8892-5.
