= Strümpell =

Strümpell may refer to:

- Adolf Strümpell (1853–1925), German neurologist who was born at Neu-Autz Estate, Courland Governorate
- Ludwig Strümpell (1812–1899), German philosopher and pedagogue

== See also ==
- Strümpell's sign, clinical sign in which the patient's attempt to flex the knee against resistance elicits an extensor plantar reflex
