= Zawory Mountains =

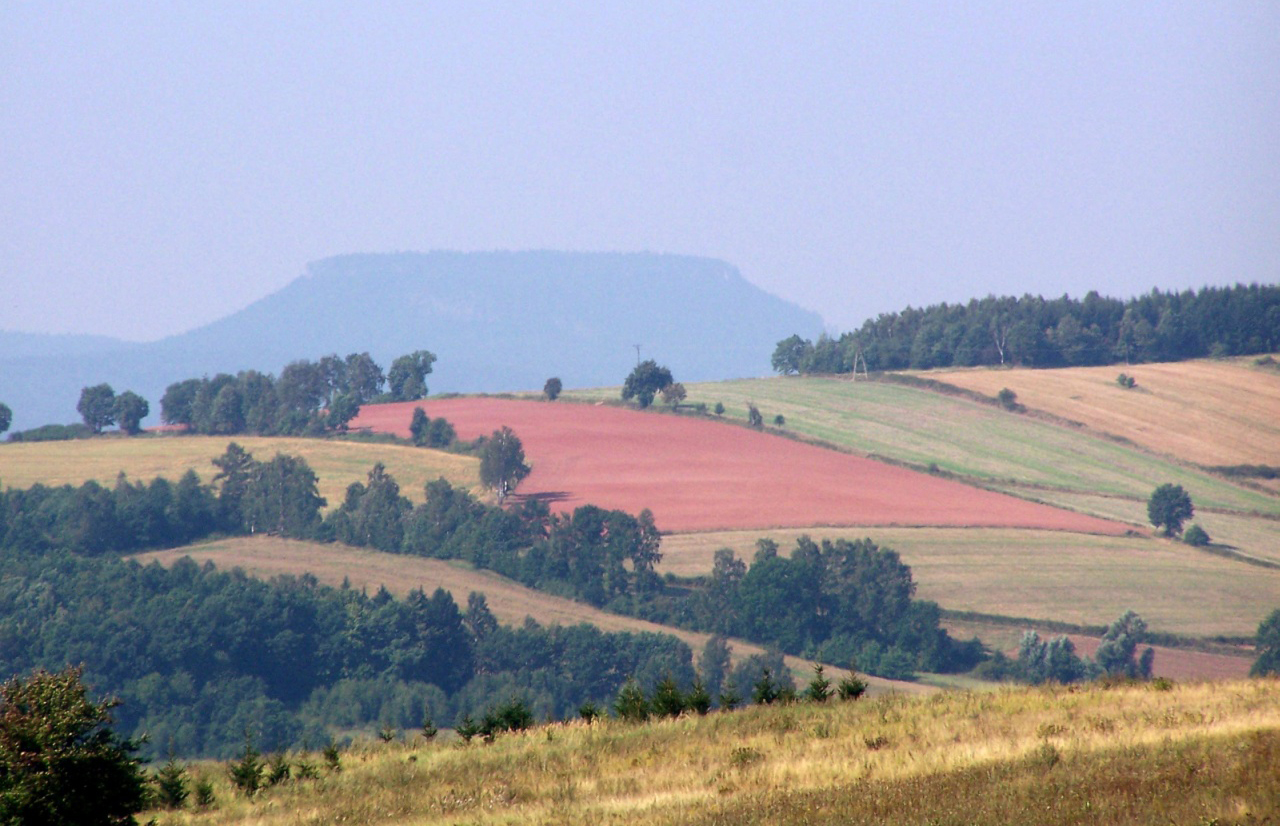

Highest point
- Peak: Róg
- Elevation: 715 m (2,346 ft)

Geography
- Countries: Poland; Czech Republic
- Voivodeship/ Region: Lower Silesian/ Hradec Králové
- Parent range: Stołowe Mountains/ Broumov Highlands

The Zawory Mountains (Czech: pohoří Závora) are a wide and flat mesa in Poland and the Czech Republic. It has an elevation of 550–715 metres. The Polish part of the ridge is considered a subdivision of the Stołowe Mountains. The Czech part of the ridge is considered a part of the Police Highlands (a microregion within the Broumov Highlands). Through the Zawory Mountains lies a continental divide of the North Sea and Baltic Sea.

== Etymology ==
The name is derived from the Polish word zawora and the Czech word závora, which mean 'closing'.

== Location ==
The Zawory Mountain range is located in the Southern part of the Polish border with the Czech Republic.

== Specification ==
The Zawory Mountain range are forest-covered mountains which are characterised with a flat surface and steep mountain sides, with isolated hills which lay in the valley of the river Zadrna in the Krzeszowska Structural Basin which close up from the North and in the North-Western part of the Stołowe Mountains. The ridges of the mountains have sandstone surfaces. The mountain mesa surfaces are located on the Czech–Polish border. The Czech part the mountain range is called Závora. The border lies in between the ridges of the mesa, on the Polish side of the border are steep ridges and several branches which lead off to flat land, on the Czech side of the mountain range there are lower and more smoother falls into the valleys, which are cut through by valleys of streams, where in the centre the Adršpach-Teplice Rocks have been formed.

On the Polish side the mountain range has a shape of a twirl which stretches from the outskirts of Golińsk to the North-Eastern part of the Czech settlement of Police nad Metují in the South. The mountain range surrounds the Adršpach-Teplice Rocks from three sides. On the highest peaks of Róg, Drogosz, Chochoł, and Mielna, there are no formations of craig and tail, which normally are found in high amounts and different shapes of the steep ridges, especially in the Gorzeszowskie Rocks which are located under Gorzeszów and in the area surrounding Różana and Łączna. Due to the large amount of smooth land and ridges the territory of the mountain range is used as fields for crops where villages are located. Forests are located in the harder to reach areas, where there are steep ridges and in the parts of the mesa where there is very steep terrain.

The highest peak of the mountain range is Róg having the height of 715 metres.

The highest peaks of the mountain range:

On the Polish side of the mountain range with border mountain peaks:

- Róg at 715 metres
- Stożek at 613 metres, on its ridges you can find the Nature Reserve Of Głazy Krasnoludków, and Lisiec at 600 metres
- Drogosz at 681 metres
- Chochoł at 668 metres
- Mielna at 651 metres
- Dziób at 692 metres
- Rogal at 630 metres
- Mieroszowskie Ściany with a ridge of 638 to 664 metres
- Buk at 638 metres

On the Czech side of the mountain range:

- Předni Rač at 710 metres
- Kroupný at 706 metres
- Skalky at 668 metres
- Rohový vrch at 698 metres
- Strážný at 696 metres
- Kamenný vrch at 636 metres
- Buková hora at 638 metres
- Mračny vrch at 587 metres
- Na kostele at 690 metres
