= Adolf Straehler =

Silesian forest scientist and plant collector

- Born: June 2, 1830; Szczawno-Zdrój (Salzbrunn), Lower Silesia, Poland
- Died: February 12, 1897 (aged 67); Jawor (Jauer), Lower Silesia, Poland
- Scientific career
- Fields: Botany, Forestry

Adolf Straehler (also Strähler) (10. December 1829 – 12 February 1897) was a Silesian forester and botanist.

== Life ==
Straehler was born in Szczawno-Zdrój (Salzbrunn), Lower Silesian, Poland. He first attended his local village school, before attending the secondary school in Kamienna Góra (Landeshut), where he was taught by Conrector Höger who cultivated Straehler's life-long interest of flora. He completed a forestry apprenticeship in Unisław Śląski (Langwaltersdorf) and then undertook military service in the Garde-Jäger-Bataillon.

After completing his service, Straehler was employed as a forestry assistant at Pszczyna (Pless) and Glinik Nowy (Neuhain). In 1858 he was transferred to Sokołowsko (Görbersdorf) and promoted to the district's forester.

In 1880, he became the chief forester at Leśniczówka Smolary (Theerkeute), and it is in Leśniczówka Smolary that he started to publish his studies of the local flora. He retired in 1890 and moved to Jawor (Jauer) to be closer to family. He died after a period of poor health in 1897.

== Published major works ==
- Adolf Straehler (1891) "Flora von Theerkeute im Kreise Czarnikau der Provinz Posen." Deutsche botanische Monatsschrift 9:9-13.
- Adolf Straehler (1896) "Floristische Skizze der Oberförsterei Theerkeute." Zeitschrift der Botanischen Abteilung 3:71-74.
- Adolf Straehler (1897) "Einiges über das Sammeln, Präparieren und Aufbewahren der Herbarpflanzene." Zeitschrift der Botanischen Abteilung 3:91-93.

== Taxonomic contributions and standard author abbreviation ==
The standard author abbreviation Strähler is used to indicate this person as the author when citing a botanical name. He named the following willow hybrids:

- Salix × hirtii Strähler.
- Salix × marchiaca Strähler.

== Botanical collections ==
Straehler's plant collections are held in various European herbaria, including the Wroclaw University herbarium, the herbarium of the Bucharest Botanical Garden, the University of Copenhagen herbarium, the Royal Botanic Garden Edinburgh, Naturalis Leiden, the Komarov Botanical Institute, and the National Museum Wales. In Australasia, specimens are held by the National Herbarium of Victoria, Royal Botanic Gardens Victoria.
