= Roman Szełemej =

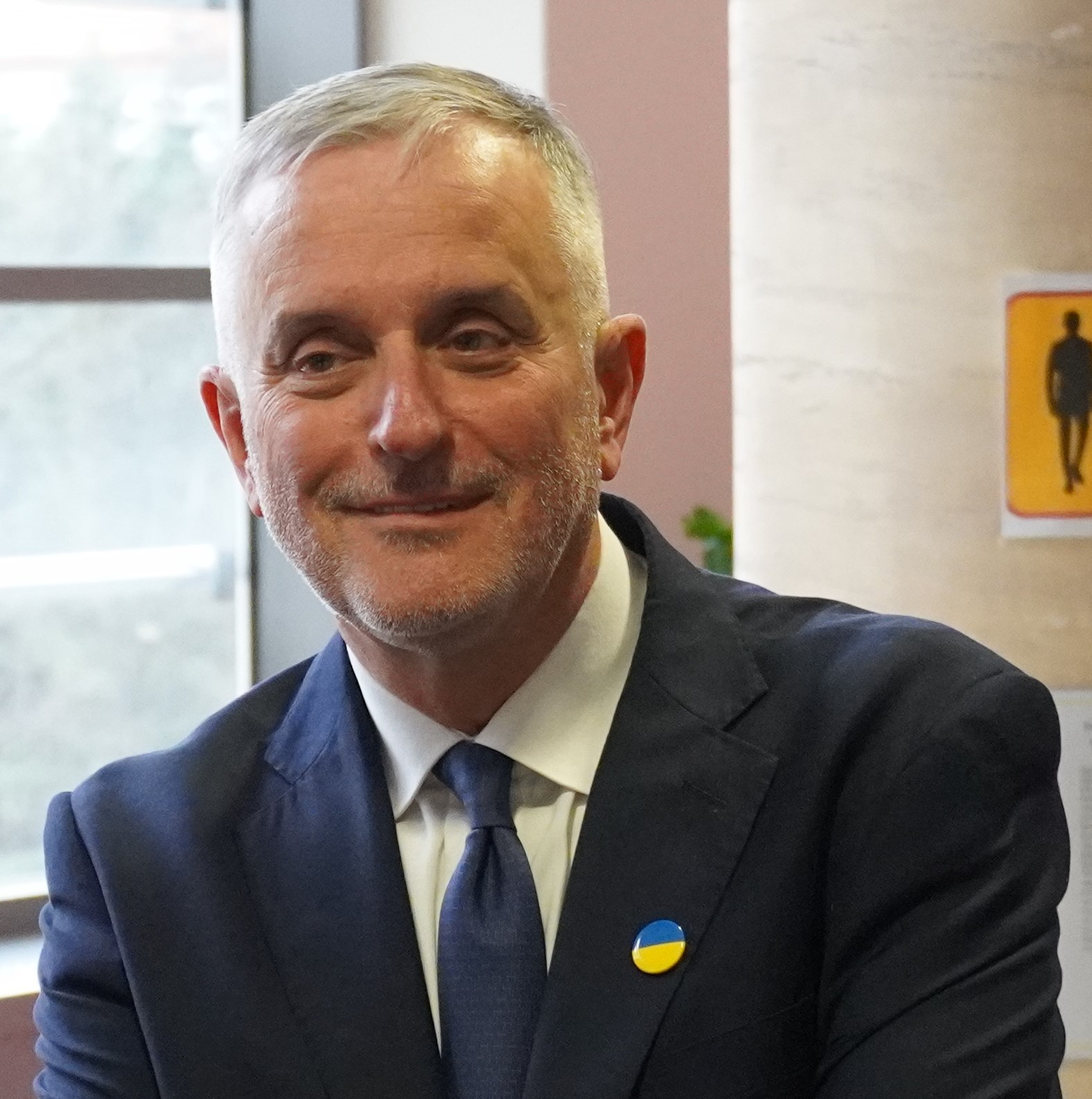

Mayor of Wałbrzych
- Incumbent
- Assumed office 26 May 2011
- Preceded by: Piotr Kruczkowski

Personal details
- Born: February 27, 1960 (age 66) Wałbrzych
- Party: Civic Platform
- Education: Wrocław Medical University
- Occupation: Physician, cardiologist, local government official
- Known for: Mayor of Wałbrzych

Roman Szełemej (born February 27, 1960, in Wałbrzych) is a Polish physician, cardiologist, and local government official, serving as the President of Wałbrzych since 2011.

== Early life and education ==
Szełemej graduated from the II High School named after Hugo Kołłątaj in Wałbrzych in 1979. He continued his education at the Faculty of Medicine of the Wrocław Medical University. After obtaining his diploma in 1985, he began his medical internship at the then Mining Hospital in Wałbrzych. A year later, he became a junior assistant in the internal medicine department. In 1996, he obtained a doctoral degree based on his dissertation titled Application of programmed physical exercises in the rehabilitation of patients with advanced circulatory insufficiency. He completed specializations in internal medicine and cardiology.

== Career ==
In 1999, Szełemej became the deputy head of the Internal Cardiology Department at the Specialist Hospital named after Dr. Alfred Sokołowski in Wałbrzych. In 2000, he assumed the position of head of the department and two years later became the director of the hospital. In 2003, he was appointed by the marshal of the Lower Silesian Voivodeship as the commissioner for the consolidation of Wałbrzych hospitals. In 2005, he became the deputy director for medical treatment at the Specialist Hospital named after Dr. Alfred Sokołowski in Wałbrzych, where he also served as the head of the cardiology department. In 2008, he was again appointed as deputy director and became the commissioner of the Voivodeship Board for health policy.

On May 26, 2011, Prime Minister Donald Tusk appointed him as the President of Wałbrzych following the resignation of Piotr Kruczkowski. Szełemej also ran in the early mayoral elections held on August 7, 2011. He ran as an independent candidate with the support of the Civic Platform (to which he later joined). He won in the first round, receiving the support of approximately 60% of voters. He was sworn in on August 11, 2011.

In 2014, he successfully ran for re-election as a Civic Platform candidate, receiving 84% of the vote in the first round. He was also elected in the first round with 84% support in 2018.

In September 2021, he was dismissed from the Wałbrzych hospital where he remained employed part-time as a physician and head of department), citing "flagrant violation of basic work duties". Szełemej described this decision as politically motivated. In July 2022, a labor court decision reinstated him to his previously held position at the hospital. Subsequently, an agreement was reached between the parties.

In 2024, he was re-elected as the President of Wałbrzych, receiving 70% of the vote in the first round.

== Honours ==
Szełemej has been honoured with the title "Meritorious for the City of Wałbrzych" (2008), as well as industry awards ("Healthcare Market Manager", "Manager of the Year 2010 in Healthcare"), and the title "Local Government Official of the Year 2019" awarded by the magazine "Wspólnota". He has been awarded the Gold (2015) and Silver (2005) Cross of Merit.

He has been recognized by Newsweek Polska as one of the 15 best mayors in Poland.
