= Tom Bentley Throckmorton =

American neurologist

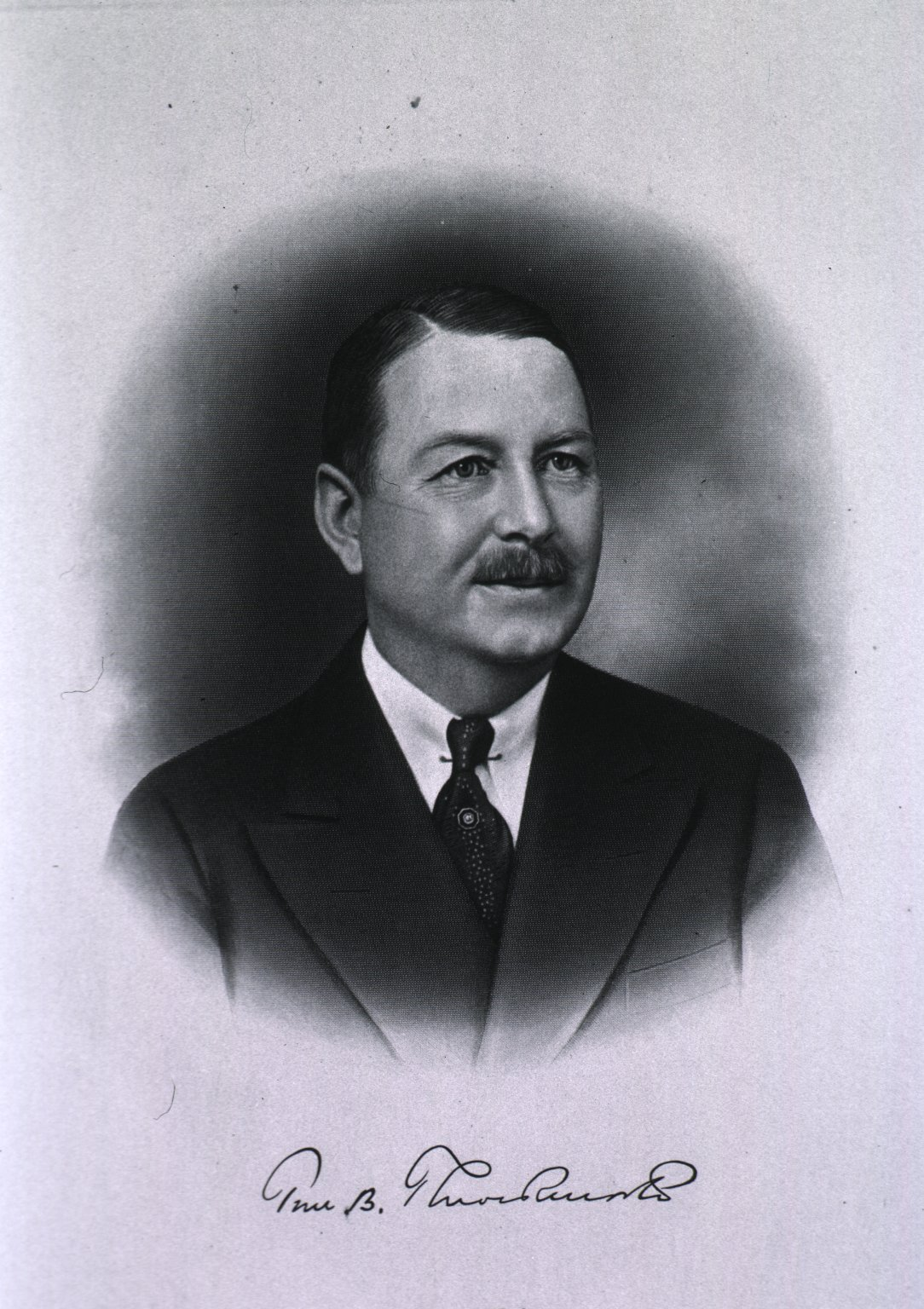
An engraving of Throckmorton from 1936

Tom Bentley Throckmorton (January 20, 1885, Derby, Iowa – 1961) was an American neurologist remembered for describing Throckmorton's reflex. He is also the namesake of the Throckmorton sign used in radiology.

== Biography ==
He studied at the Jefferson Medical College, graduating M.D. in 1909 with a gold medal for the best neurological examination. He worked at the Maplewood Sanatorium, the Philadelphia Orthopedic Hospital, the Infirmary for Nervous Diseases in Philadelphia and the Cheroku State Hospital for the Insane before settling as a lecturer in neurology in Des Moines, Iowa. He was Governor of the Iowa Chapter of the American College of Physicians from 1927 to 1936.

His sister, Jeannette Throckmorton, was also a doctor.
