= Nowe Siodło =

- Village
- Location within Poland
- Coordinates: 50°40′N 16°11′E
- Country: Poland
- Voivodeship: Lower Silesian
- County: Wałbrzych
- Gmina: Mieroszów

Nowe Siodło [ˈnɔvɛ ˈɕɔdwɔ] is a village in the administrative district of Gmina Mieroszów, within Wałbrzych County, Lower Silesian Voivodeship, in south-western Poland, near the border with the Czech Republic.
