= Jeannette Throckmorton =

American physician

Dr. Jeannette Throckmorton
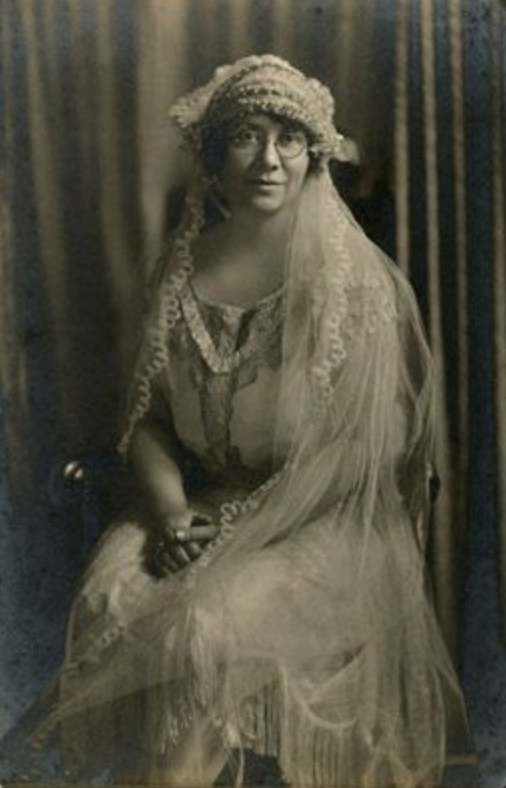
- Throckmorton in 1928
- Born: Jeannette Franc Throckmorton; January 26, 1883; Derby, Iowa, U.S.
- Died: July 22, 1963 (aged 80); Chariton, Iowa, U.S.
- Education: Keokuk Medical College
- Occupation: Physician
- Spouse: Charles N. Dean (m. 1928; died 1928)
- Relatives: Tom Bentley Throckmorton (brother)
- Medical career
- Profession: General practitioner; lecturer; medical librarian
- Field: Public health
- Institutions: Iowa State Medical Library; United States Public Health Service
- Sub-specialties: Internal medicine

Jeannette Throckmorton (1883–1963; after marriage, Dean-Throckmorton) was an American physician, public health lecturer, medical librarian, and quilter. She was widely known over Iowa for her health work and as a physician. In addition to serving as the Iowa State Medical librarian for nearly 34 years, Throckmorton was president of the State Society of Iowa Medical Women, vice-president of the Royal Institute of Public Health (London), and a Fellow of the American Congress of Internal Medicine. In her past-time, Throckmorton created more than sixty quilts.

== Early life and education ==
Jeannette Franc Throckmorton was born in Derby, Iowa on January 26, 1883. Her parents were Dr. Thomas M. Throckmorton of Chariton, Iowa, and Mary Throckmorton. Third in a family of seven children, her brother, Tom Bentley Throckmorton, was also a doctor. Her grandparents were Theo Bentley Russell and Dorothy Russell Sorensen. Lady Lillian Throckmorton was a relative.

As a child, Throckmorton enjoyed sewing, and made doll dresses with buttons and buttonholes.

She earned a Ph. B. degree from Simpson College (1904), which also awarded her an Epsilon Sigma key in 1925 for scholastic honors gained in former years. She graduated from the Keokuk Medical College in 1907. She received her A. M. degree from Iowa Wesleyan University (1904 or 1909), and from the University of Nebraska (1910–11).

Additional graduate work was undertaken at Columbia University and the University of Chicago.

== Career ==
Throckmorton a general practitioner in the early 1900s, who practiced medicine with her father in an office in Chariton after her graduation from medical school (1907–19). When she took the Iowa state examination that year, she scored the highest average ever attained. During her medical practice in Chariton, Throckmorton took an active part in infant welfare, serving for ten years as judge in the Better Babies conference at the Iowa State Fair.

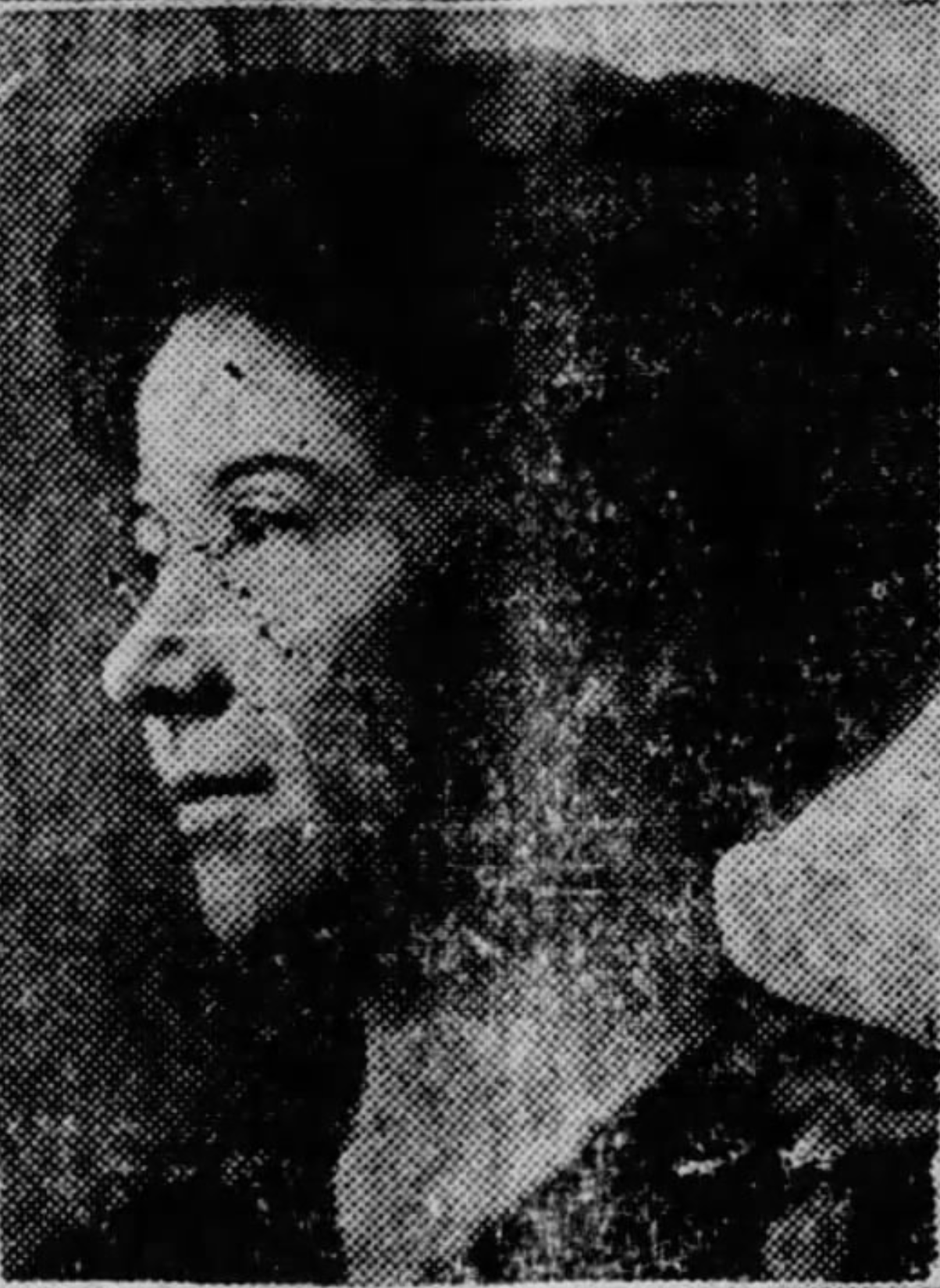
1919

In 1919, Throckmorton entered the United States Public Health Service cooperating with the Iowa State Board of Health, and for six years, lectured throughout Iowa and other states.

In June 1919, she delivered a series of lectures on "Social Hygiene" under the auspices of the YWCA in Winston-Salem, North Carolina, and gave a lecture to the women of that city on subjects dealing with a higher standard of social morality at the board of trade room.

She represented the State of Iowa in October of that year at the International Conference of Women Physicians in session at the national headquarters of the Young Women's Christian Association in New York City. She was the lecturer in charge of women's work of the Iowa State Board of Health and in going to the conference received credentials signed by Governor William L. Harding. Throckmorton left New York in response to a telegram from Surgeon General Rupert Blue of the U.S. Public Health Service, requesting her to go to North Dakota to address the State Federation of Women's Clubs in session in Grand Forks. Later that year, she addressed the American Public Health Association in New Orleans, and the Southern Medical Association in its conference at Asheville, North Carolina. At the Southern Medical Association meeting, Throckmorton addressed the clothing worn by women as being not only indecent, but unhealthy as well. she ridiculed high heels on shoes, not only because of the fact they ruin the feet, but also contribute to many other bodily ills.

"American women must give up the heel that causes faulty posture and disgraceful walk and carriage, to say nothing of the damage it does to healthy and normal physical development" (Jeannette Throckmorton, 1918)

Throckmorton conducted a "keeping fit" campaign among the young women and girls of Sioux City, Iowa in April 1920. Taking the position that women crave advice, posture, dress, bathing, rouge, high heels and suitable clothes for school were among the subjects discussed by the doctor before high school groups. Motherhood and fatherhood and social relationships were also subjects included in her schedule of lectures. She received an appointment to deliver her lecture on "Fashions and Public Health" before the Brussels congress of the Royal Institute of Public Health under the patronage of King George, Queen Mary, the Prince of Wales and Albert, King of the Belgians in Brussels, on May 20, 1920. That year, she served as vice-president of the Royal Institute.

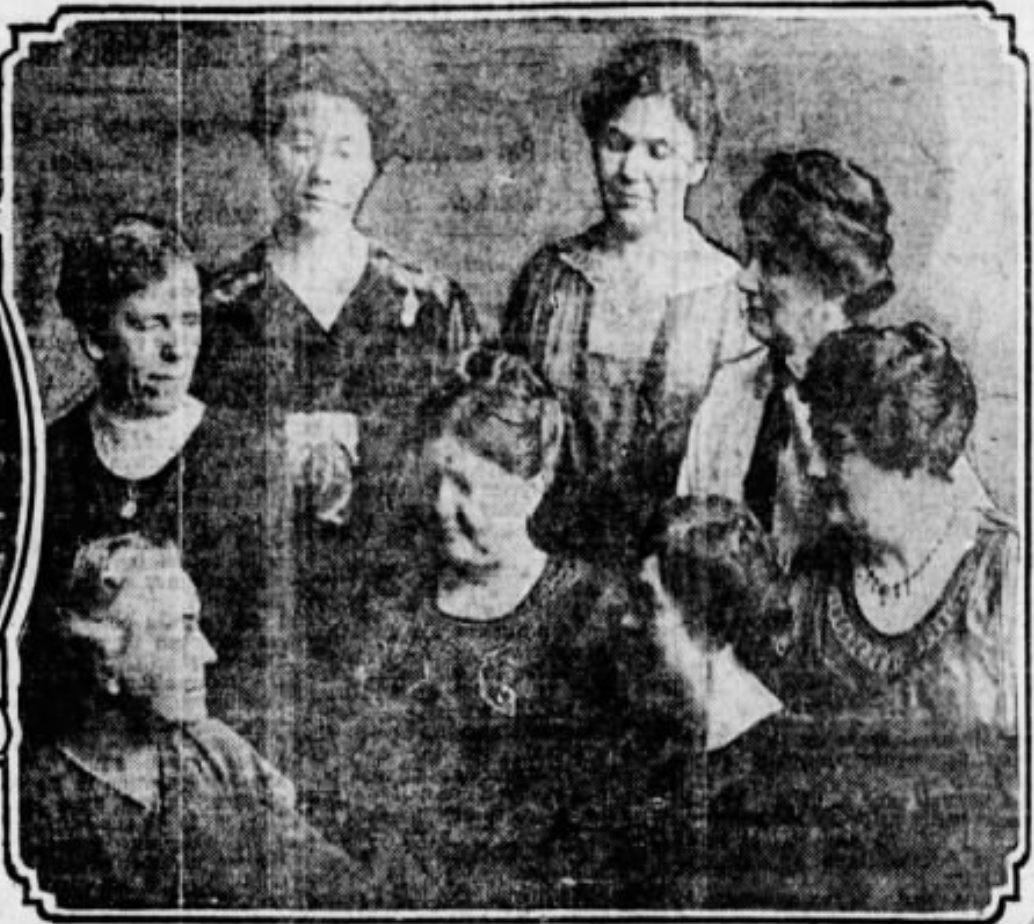
Dr. Kate Stevens Harpel, Throckmorton, Dr. Velura Powell, Miss Esse Hathaway (upper row, l-r); Dr. Josephine Rust, Dr. Lenna Meanes, Dr. Nelle Noble, Dr. Mae Habenicht (lower row, l-r) (1919)

A fellowship in the American College of Physicians was conferred upon Throckmorton in 1921 while in attendance at the American Congress of Internal Medicine at Baltimore, Maryland.

In 1924, in Davenport, Iowa and vicinity, she gave a series of lectures on the pictures "Where Life Begins" and "The End of the Road".

From 1929, she served as the Iowa State Medical librarian for nearly 34 years.

For the Iowa Federation of Women's Clubs, she served for many years as chair of social education. In the Iowa State Medical Society, she served continuously as chair of the committee on health and public instruction; she was a life member of the society. She was president of the State Society of Iowa Medical Women in 1918.

== Personal life ==
On March 1, 1928, she married Dr. Charles N. Dean of Sumner, Illinois. They met while attending medical college. He died ten days later from an attack of dyspnoea.

While in Chicago attending postgraduate studies in medicine, Throckmorton enrolled in an art appreciation course. She began quilting in 1907, and subsequently created more than sixty quilts. She enjoyed including trapunto work in her quilting. All of her quilts contained a stitched in signature of "Dr. Jeannette". A bookshelf contained texts and catalogs on the subject of quilting. She won trophies, awards, and blue ribbons for her skillful needlework, a tradition carried out by women in her family. In 1958, she submitted two quilts that she had designed and created to the Chicago Art Institute as an unrestricted gift.

Throckmorton was a member of the Daughters of the American Revolution, P.E.O. Sisterhood, Order of the Eastern Star, and White Shrine of Jerusalem.

In 1953, she was struck by a car while crossing a street.

== Death and legacy ==
Jeannette Dean Throckmorton died of cancer in Chariton, on July 22, 1963.

In 1979, M.J. Schroeder published "Manuscript collections: The Jeannette Dean-Throckmorton papers" in volume 44, issue 7, of the Annals of Iowa.
