= Mieroszów =

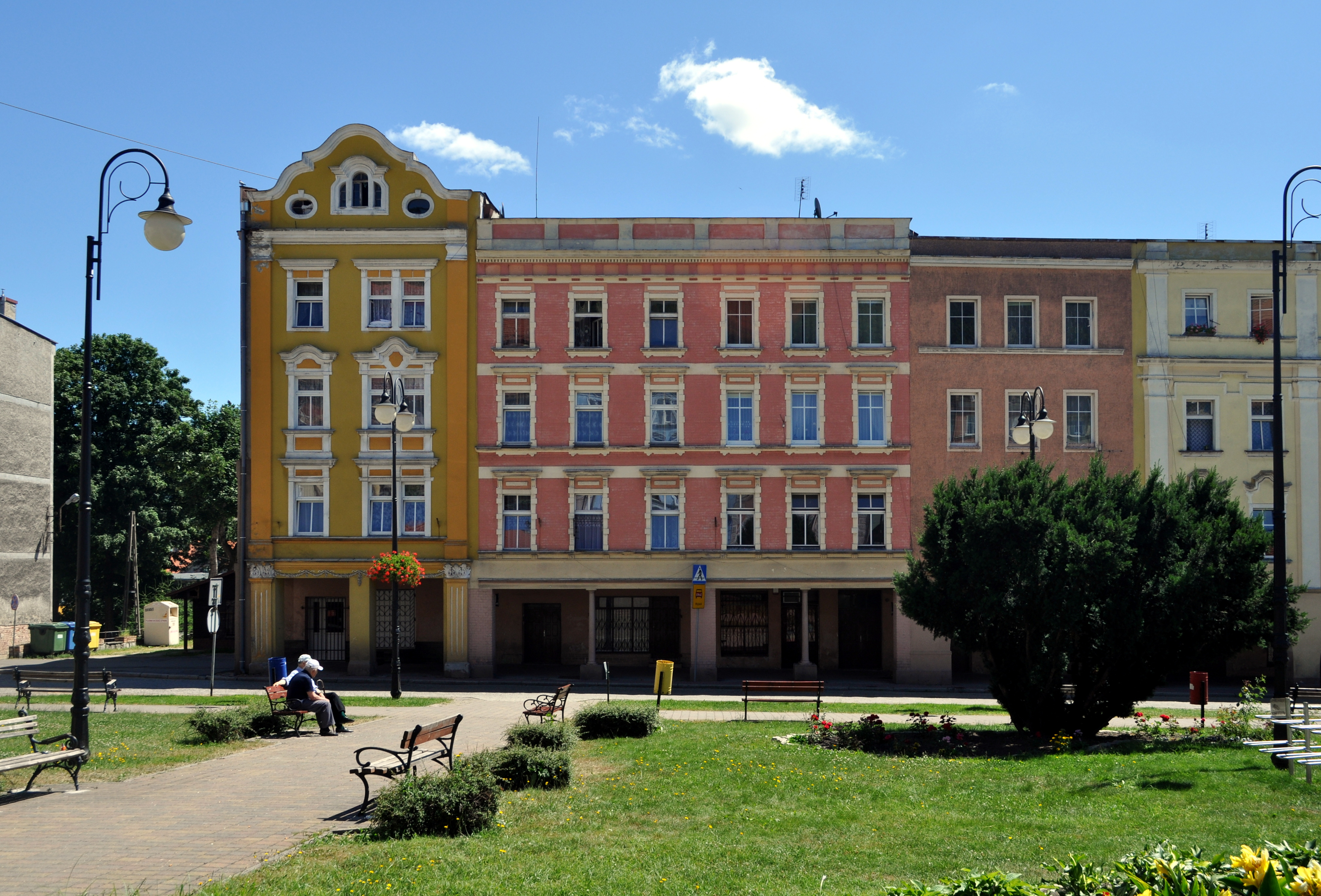
- Main square in Mieroszów

- Flag Coat of arms

- Location within Poland
- Coordinates: 50°40′1″N 16°11′23″E
- Country: Poland
- Voivodeship: Lower Silesian
- County: Wałbrzych
- Gmina: Mieroszów
- Town rights: 14th century

Area
  - Total: 10.31 km^{2} (3.98 sq mi)

Population (2019-06-30)
  - Total: 4,070
  - Density: 395/km^{2} (1,020/sq mi)
- Time zone: UTC+1 (CET)
  - Summer (DST): UTC+2 (CEST)
- Postal code: 58-350
- Vehicle registration: DBA
- Website: https://mieroszow.pl

Mieroszów [mjɛˈrɔʂuf] (formerly: Fyrląd; German: Friedland in Niederschlesien) is a town in Wałbrzych County, Lower Silesian Voivodeship, in south-western Poland, near the border with the Czech Republic. It is the seat of the administrative district (gmina) called Gmina Mieroszów.

As of 2019, the town has a population of 4,070.

== History ==
Town rights were granted in 1303.

During World War II, Nazi Germany operated several forced labour camps in the town, initially mostly for Poles (entire families with children), and later also for Soviet and Italian prisoners of war. In September 1944, a subcamp of the Gross-Rosen concentration camp was established, in which initially some 300 Polish Jews were held, and later also Slovak and Hungarian Jews. Hard labour, starvation and lice resulted in the deaths of many prisoners. The camp was liberated on 9 May 1945 at the end of the war. No one from the SS camp staff was tried after the war.

== Demographics ==
Historical population
Year	Pop.	±%
1900	4,771	—
1925	4,613	−3.3%
1939	4,386	−4.9%
1950	5,571	+27.0%
1960	5,830	+4.6%

== Sport ==
Mieroszów is known for the Jatki mountain (also called the New Saddle) which has a well profiled hang-glider and paraglider launching slope for south winds. This is an easy training slope with a hang-glider ramp, but experienced pilots have done some long unpowered flights from the site.

== Twin towns – sister cities ==
See twin towns of Gmina Mieroszów.

== Notable people ==
- Fedor Krause (1857–1937), German neurosurgeon
