= Fedor Krause =

German neurosurgeon (1857–1937)

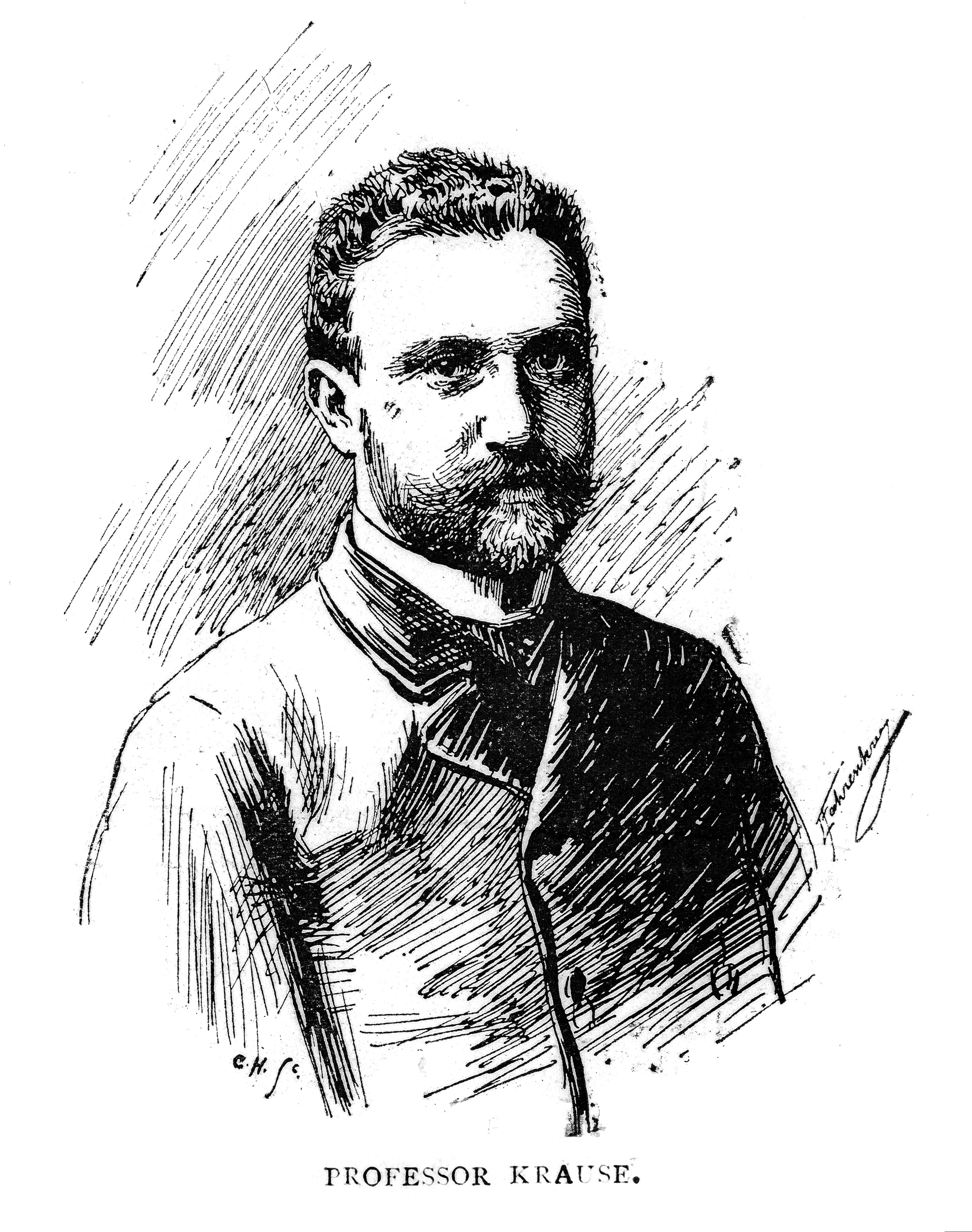
Fedor Krause (1857–1937)

Fedor Krause (10 March 1857 – in Friedland in Niederschlesien; 20 September 1937 in Bad Gastein) was a German neurosurgeon who was native of Friedland (Lower Silesia).

== Biography ==
He originally studied music at the Conservatoire in Berlin, and later switched to medicine, earning his doctorate at Humboldt University in Berlin. In 1883 he became a medical assistant to Richard von Volkmann (1830-1889) at the surgical university clinic at Halle. Afterwards, he was a pathologist at the Senckenberg Institute in Frankfurt am Main (1890–92), a surgeon at the city hospital at Hamburg-Altona (1892-1900), and later head of the surgical department at Augusta Hospital in Berlin. In 1901 he became an associate professor at the University of Berlin. While in Berlin, he worked closely with neurologist Hermann Oppenheim (1858-1919) and he lived on island Schwanenwerder.

During World War I he served as a surgical consultant, and following the war embarked on scientific journeys to Latin America, where he introduced neurosurgical practices into several countries. In 1931 Krause retired from medicine, devoting his last years to artistic and musical pursuits in Rome.

== Contributions in surgery ==
Krause was a pioneer in the field of neurosurgery, and with Otfrid Foerster (1873-1941) was responsible for introducing surgical operations for treatment of epilepsy into Germany. During his career he performed over 400 operations on epileptic patients. He is also remembered for his work in plastic and reconstructive surgery, and was an early practitioner of intraoperative electrostimulation of the cerebral cortex.

He developed a number of operative techniques involving tumors of the brain and spinal cord. The eponymous Hartley-Krause operation is named after Krause and surgeon Frank Hartley (1857-1913). This procedure involves an excision of the Gasserian ganglion and its roots to relieve trigeminal neuralgia.

Today the German Neurosurgical Society awards the "Fedor Krause Medal" for outstanding work in the field of neurosurgery.

== Written works ==
- Über die Verwendung großer ungestielter Hautlappen zu plastischen Zwecken, (Concerning the use of large sessile skin flaps for plastic surgery), 1896.
- Chirurgie des Gehirns und Rückenmarks (Surgery of the brain and spinal cord), two volumes 1907 (later translated into English and French).
- Chirurgische Operationslehre des Kopfes (Surgical lessons involving the head), 2 volumes, Berlin 1912 and 1914.
- Die allgemeine Chirurgie der Gehirnkrankheiten (General surgery of brain diseases), with K. Heymann, 2 volumes, Berlin 1914.
- Die Tuberkulose der Knochen und Gelenke (Tuberculosis of the bones and joints), 1891 (later translated into English).
- Lehrbuch der chirurgischen Operationen (Textbook of surgery), Berlin 1912–1914 (later translated into Russian, English and Spanish).
