= Cornell's sign =

- Differential diagnosis: Pyramidal tract lesions

Cornell's sign is a clinical sign in which scratching along the inner side of the extensor hallucis longus tendon elicits an extensor plantar reflex. It is found in patients with pyramidal tract lesions, and is one of a number of Babinski-like responses.
