= Rybnica Leśna =

- Village
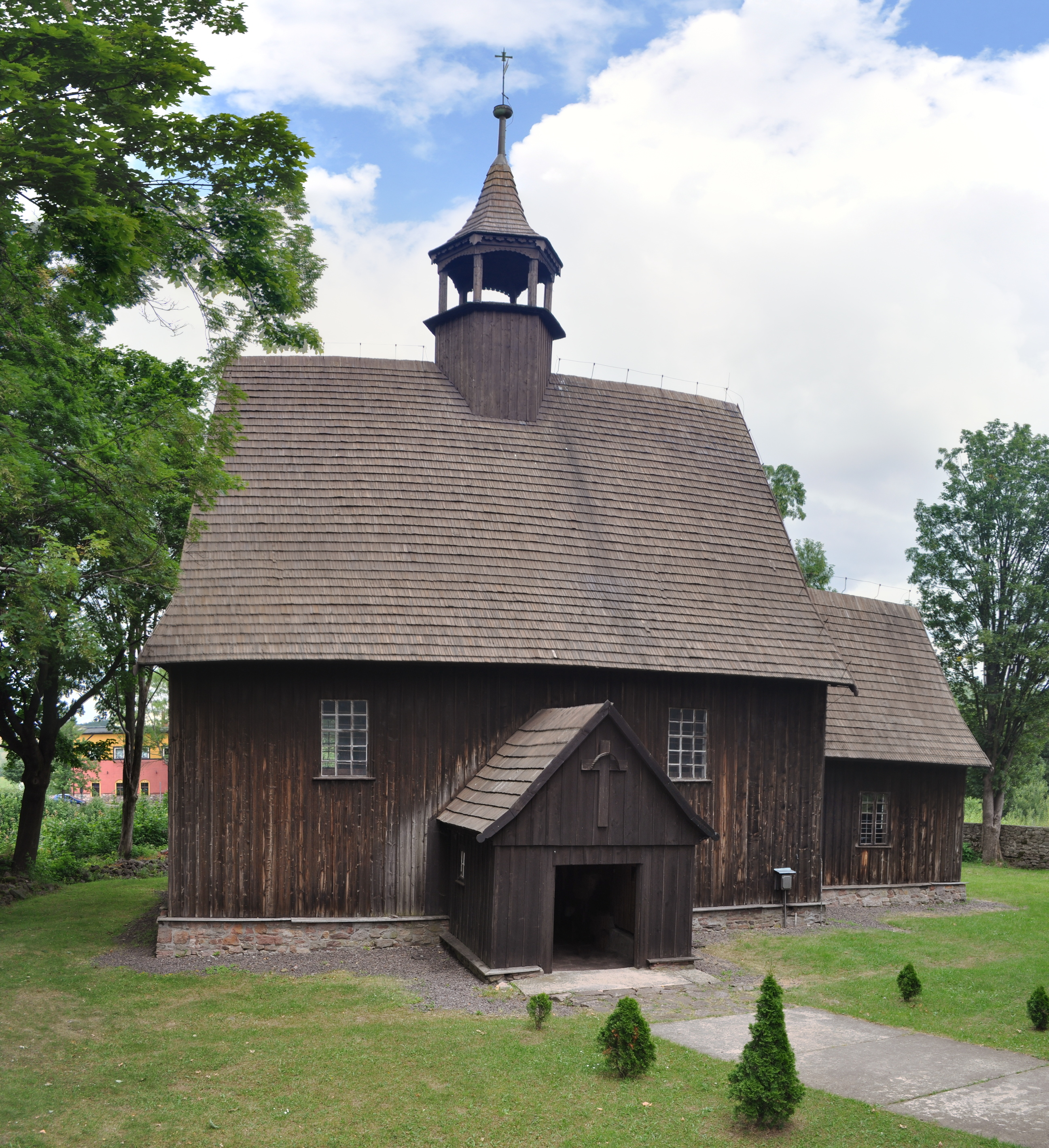
- Church in Rybnica Leśna

- Location within Poland
- Coordinates: 50°42′N 16°17′E
- Country: Poland
- Voivodeship: Lower Silesian
- County: Wałbrzych
- Gmina: Mieroszów
- Population: 210

Rybnica Leśna [rɨbˈnit͡sa ˈlɛɕna] is a village in the administrative district of Gmina Mieroszów, within Wałbrzych County, Lower Silesian Voivodeship, in south-western Poland.
