= Oppenheim's sign =

- Differential diagnosis: Pyramidal tract damage

Oppenheim's sign is dorsiflexion of the great toe elicited by irritation downward of the medial side of the tibia. It is one of a number of Babinski-like responses.The sign's presence indicates damage to the pyramidal tract.

It is named after Hermann Oppenheim.
