= Moniz sign =

- Differential diagnosis: Pyramidal tract lesions

Moniz sign is a clinical sign in which forceful passive plantar flexion of the ankle elicits an extensor plantar reflex. It is found in patients with pyramidal tract lesions, and is one of a number of Babinski-like responses. It is named after Portuguese neurologist António Egas Moniz.
