= Strümpell's sign =

- Differential diagnosis: Pyramidal tract lesions

Strümpell's sign is a clinical sign in which the patient's attempt to flex the knee against resistance elicits an extensor plantar reflex. It is found in patients with pyramidal tract lesions, and is one of a number of Babinski-like responses.

The sign is named after Adolf Strümpell.
