= Stransky's sign =

- Differential diagnosis: Pyramidal tract lesions

Stransky's sign is a clinical sign in which vigorous abduction followed by the sudden release of the little toe causes an extensor plantar reflex. It is found in patients with pyramidal tract lesions, and is one of a number of Babinski-like responses.

The sign is named after the Viennese neurologist Erwin Stransky (1877–1962).
