= Plantar reflex =

Reflex of the human foot

Plantar reflex Babinski response/Babinski sign (pathological)
- The reflex occurs upon stroking of the sole of the foot with a blunt object such as a pen. If the reflex occurs in adults as illustrated at bottom it may be due to nerve damage or disease.
- ICD-9-CM: 796.1
- MedlinePlus: 003294

The plantar reflex is a superficial reflex elicited when the sole of the foot is stimulated with a blunt instrument. The reflex can take one of two forms. In healthy adults, the plantar reflex causes a downward response of the hallux (flexion).

An upward response (extension or dorsiflexion) of the hallux is known as the Babinski response or Babinski sign, named after the neurologist Joseph Babinski. The presence of the Babinski sign can identify disease of the spinal cord and brain in adults and also exists as a primitive reflex in infants.

While first described in the medical literature by Babinski in 1896, the reflex has been identified in art at least as early as Botticelli's Virgin and Child with an Angel, painted in the mid-15th century.

== Methods ==
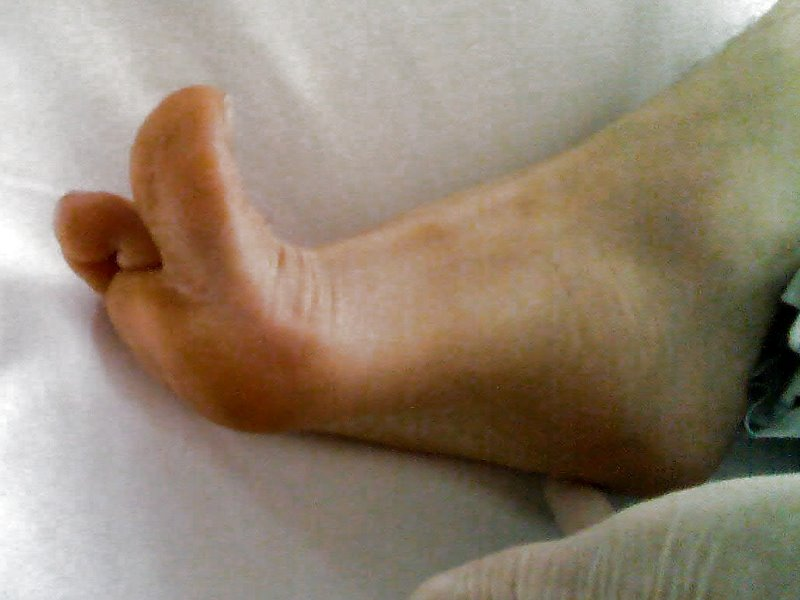
Pathological Babinski's sign in adult

The lateral side of the sole of the foot is rubbed with a blunt instrument or device, so as not to cause pain, discomfort, or injury to the skin; the instrument is run from the heel along a curve to the toes (metatarsal pads). Many reflex hammers taper at the end of the handle to a point which was used for testing the plantar response in the past; due to the tightening of infection control regulation this is no longer recommended. Either a single use device or the thumbnail should be used.

There are three responses possible:

- Flexor: the toes curve down and inwards, and the foot inverts; this is the response seen in healthy adults.
- Indifferent: there is no response. This is called the neutral response, and has no clinical significance, as it does not rule out pathology.
- Extensor: the hallux dorsiflexes, and the other toes fan out. If elicited in an adult, it indicates damage to the central nervous system, but it is a normal reflex in infants (see below). It is also known as the Babinski Sign.

As the lesion responsible for the sign expands, so does the area from which the afferent Babinski response may be elicited. The Babinski response is also normal while asleep and after a long period of walking.

== Interpretation ==
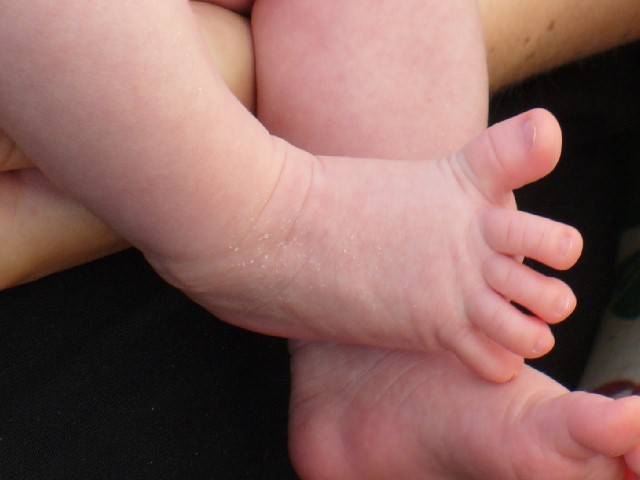
Babinski's sign in a healthy newborn

The Babinski sign can indicate upper motor neuron lesion constituting damage to the corticospinal tract. Occasionally, a pathological plantar reflex is the first and only indication of a serious disease process and a clearly abnormal plantar reflex often prompts detailed neurological investigations, including CT scanning of the brain or MRI of the spine, as well as lumbar puncture for the study of cerebrospinal fluid.

The phrase "negative Babinski sign" is sometimes used for the normal flexor plantar response.

=== In infants ===
Infants will usually show an extensor response. In one study of 256 healthy infants, the response to testing was extensor in 73.8%, flexor in 8.9%, and equivocal in 17.3% This extensor response occurs because the corticospinal pathways that run from the brain down the spinal cord are not fully myelinated at this age, so the reflex is not inhibited by the cerebral cortex. The extensor response usually disappears – giving way to the flexor response – by 12 months of age. Its persistence beyond age 2–3 indicates a problem in the brain or spinal cord.

=== Pathways ===
- Afferent: Nociception detected in the S1 dermatome and travels up the tibial nerve to the sciatic nerve to roots of L5,S1 and synapse in the anterior horn to elicit the motor response.
- Efferent: Motor response back through the L5,S1 roots to the sciatic nerve to its bifurcation. Toe flexors are innervated by the tibial nerve. Toe extensors (extensor hallucis longus, extensor digitorum longus) are innervated by the deep peroneal nerve. Loss of normal adult descending pyramidal control of the reflex arc to suppress extensor withdrawal results in the upgoing toes in the plantar reflex known as Babinski's sign.

== Relationship to Hoffmann's reflex ==
The Hoffmann's reflex is sometimes described as the upper limb equivalent of the Babinski sign because both indicate upper motor neuron dysfunction. Mechanistically, they differ significantly; the finger flexor reflex is a simple monosynaptic spinal reflex involving the flexor digitorum profundus that is normally fully inhibited by upper motor neurons. The pathway producing the plantar response is more complicated and is not monosynaptic.

== Babinski-like responses ==
The plantar reflex can be elicited in a number of ways, which were described in the late 19th and early 20th century. These have their own eponyms.

- Bing sign – multiple pinpricks on the dorsum of the foot
- Cornell sign – scratching along the inner side of the extensor hallucis longus tendon
- Chaddock sign – stroking the lateral malleolus
- Doug's sign – electrically stimulating peripheral nerves during a nerve conduction study
- Gonda sign – flexing and suddenly releasing the 4th toe
- Gordon sign – squeezing the calf muscle
- Moniz sign – forceful passive plantar flexion of the ankle
- Oppenheim sign – applying pressure to the medial side of the tibia
- Schaeffer sign – squeezing the Achilles tendon
- Silva sign – pinching the rectus femoris muscle
- Stransky sign – vigorously abducting and suddenly releasing the little toe
- Strümpell sign – patient attempts to flex the knee against resistance
- Throckmorton reflex – percussion over the metatarsophalangeal joint of the big toe

=== Abnormal reflexes seen as flexion of toes ===
- Bekhterev-Mendel reflex – flexion of the 2nd to 5th toes on percussion of the dorsum of the foot
- Rossolimo sign – exaggerated flexion of the toes induced by rapid percussion on the tips of the toes
