= Gonda's sign =

- Differential diagnosis: Pyramidal tract lesions

Gonda's sign is a clinical sign in which flexing and then suddenly releasing the fourth toe elicits an extensor plantar reflex. It is found in patients with pyramidal tract lesions, and is one of a number of Babinski-like responses. It is named after the Ukrainian neuropsychiatrist Viktor Gonda (1889–1959), who discovered it sometime in the mid-1930s while he was practicing in the United States. Gonda was one of the strong proponents of electrotherapy to cure psychiatric illnesses.
