= Gmina Mieroszów =

Gmina Mieroszów Mieroszów Commune
- Gmina
- Flag Coat of arms
- Interactive map of Gmina Mieroszów
- Coordinates (Mieroszów): 50°40′01″N 16°11′23″E
- Country: Poland
- Voivodeship: Lower Silesian
- County: Wałbrzych
- Seat: Mieroszów
- Sołectwos: Golińsk, Kowalowa, Łączna, Nowe Siodło, Różana, Rybnica Leśna, Sokołowsko, Unisław Śląski

Area
  - Total: 76.17 km^{2} (29.41 sq mi)

Population (2019-06-30)
  - Total: 6,808
  - Density: 89.38/km^{2} (231.5/sq mi)
  - Urban: 4,070
  - Rural: 2,738
- Website: https://mieroszow.pl

Gmina Mieroszów is an urban-rural gmina (administrative district) in Wałbrzych County, Lower Silesian Voivodeship, in south-western Poland. Its seat is the town of Mieroszów, which lies approximately 15 kilometres (9 mi) south-west of Wałbrzych, and 79 kilometres (49 mi) south-west of the regional capital Wrocław.

The gmina covers an area of 76.17 square kilometres (29.4 sq mi), and as of 2019 its total population is 6,808.

== Neighbouring gminas ==
Gmina Mieroszów is bordered by the towns of Boguszów-Gorce, Jedlina-Zdrój and Wałbrzych, and the gminas of Czarny Bór, Głuszyca, Kamienna Góra and Lubawka.

== Villages ==
Apart from the town of Mieroszów, the gmina contains the villages of Golińsk, Kowalowa, Łączna, Nowe Siodło, Różana, Rybnica Leśna, Sokołowsko and Unisław Śląski.

== Twin towns – sister cities ==
Gmina Mieroszów is twinned with:

- Debrzno, Poland
- Friedland, Brandenburg, Germany
- Friedland, Lower Saxony, Germany
- Friedland, Mecklenburg-Vorpommern, Germany
- Frýdlant, Czech Republic
- Frýdlant nad Ostravicí, Czech Republic
- Korfantów, Poland
- Mirosławiec, Poland
- Pravdinsk, Russia
