= Emil Mattiesen =

German composer, philosopher, parapsychologist (1875–1939)

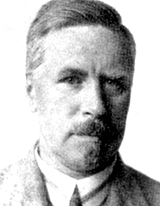
- Born: 23 January [O.S. 11] 1875; Dorpat, Kreis Dorpat, Governorate of Estonia, Russian Empire (present-day Tartu, Tartu County, Estonia)
- Died: 25 September 1939 (aged 64); Rostock, Mecklenburg-Schwerin, Nazi Germany
- Education: Imperial University of Dorpat; University of Leipzig; University of Cambridge; University of London
- Occupations: Musician; Composer; Philosopher; Academic
- Organization: University of Rostock

Emil Karl Gustav Alfred Mattiesen (23 January 1875 – 25 September 1939) was a Baltic-German musician, music pedagogue, composer and philosopher. He composed lieder, song cycles, ballads, chamber music and organ music, but is better known for standard works in German on parapsychology. He was a professor of church music at the University of Rostock from 1929.

== Life ==
Mattiesen was born in Dorpat. The son of Emil Karl Johann Mattiesen (1835–1888), an editor-in-chief and town councillor, and Emilie (née Strümpell; 1846–1917), daughter of the philosopher and pedagogue Ludwig Strümpell, he attended a private school, the Kollmann'sche Privat-Lehranstalt, in his hometown. He received musical instruction at age 16. He completed school with the Abitur in 1892 at the gymnasium in Mitau. He studied philosophy, natural sciences and music, first in Dorpat, then from 1893 at the University of Leipzig. He had to interrupt his studies due to illness in the fall of 1894, and continued in 1895, first again in Dorpat, and from October 1895 again in Leipzig, where he received a PhD in 1896, writing about the philosophical critique in the work of John Locke and George Berkeley.

Mattiesen travelled in Asia and America from 1898 to 1903, learning several Asian languages and the basics of Hinduism and other religions. From 1904 to 1908, he studied at the University of Cambridge and in London. He wrote his first major book, completed in 1914 but not published until 1925: Der jenseitige Mensch. Eine Einführung in die Metapsychologie der mystischen Erfahrung (Man of the Next World. An Introduction to the Metapsychology of the Mystical Experience). When he returned to Germany in 1908, he lived in Berlin, where he married and focused on music. He lived in Fürstenfeldbruck, Bavaria, for several years. He founded an association for the publication of his works in Munich in 1921.

In 1925, he moved to the village of Gehlsdorf, now part of Rostock. He was a lecturer on church music at the Theological Faculty of the University of Rostock from 1929. He was a composer of Lieder, especially ballads, and of chamber and organ music. His compositions were published by Henri Hinrichsen, on a recommendation by Hugo Wolf, including 17 Liederhefte (song collections). He composed lieder for the contralto Lula Mysz-Gmeiner, and accompanied her in performances. These lieder included "Selige Sehnsucht" (Blissful longing), "Die kleine Passion" (The little passion) and "Philomele". A review in the journal Die Musik from February 1914 reports a recital in which she premiered five songs and mentions the composer's talent for humorous topics, such as "Jedem das seine" after a poem by Eduard Mörike.

He also researched and published in the field of parapsychology. His two main books in the field, Der jenseitige Mensch (published in 1925) and Das persönliche Überleben des Todes: eine Darstellung der Erfahrungsbeweise (The Personal Survival of Death: An Account of the Empirical Evidence) in three volumes (1936–1939), became standard works in German. In his magnum opus Das persönliche Überleben des Todes, he advocated the survival hypothesis, listing several phenomena which seem to prove empirically that the soul lives on after death. The Nazis objected to the topic, which caused his work to be neglected at first.

Mattiesen died in Rostock of leukemia shortly after the beginning of World War II.

== Works ==
=== Compositions ===
- 1910 Balladen vom Tode
- 1910 Ballade von der Liebe
- 1920 Sieben Gesänge nach Gedichten von Ricarda Huch
- 1922 Stille Lieder
- 1930 Der Pilger. Ein Liederzyklus
- Glockengießer zu Breslau
- Pidder Lüng
- Lenore after Gottfried August Bürger

=== Philosophy ===
- 1897 Ueber philosophische Kritik bei Locke und Berkeley (Dissertation)
- 1926 Die Kunstkasse in Neukloster. Eine Geschichte und ein Aufruf in Mecklenburgische Monatshefte

=== Parapsychology ===
- 1925 Der jenseitige Mensch. Eine Einführung in die Metapsychologie der mystischen Erfahrung. reprinted unchanged in 1987 by Walter de Gruyter-Verlag Berlin and New York
- 1936–39 Das persönliche Ueberleben des Todes. Eine Darstellung der Erfahrungsbeweise (3 vols.). Reprinted in 1961 with a preface by Gebhard Frei, reprinted in 1987 with a preface by Bauer, both Walter de Gruyter-Verlag Berlin – New York
