= Kowalowa, Lower Silesian Voivodeship =

Kowalowa
- Village
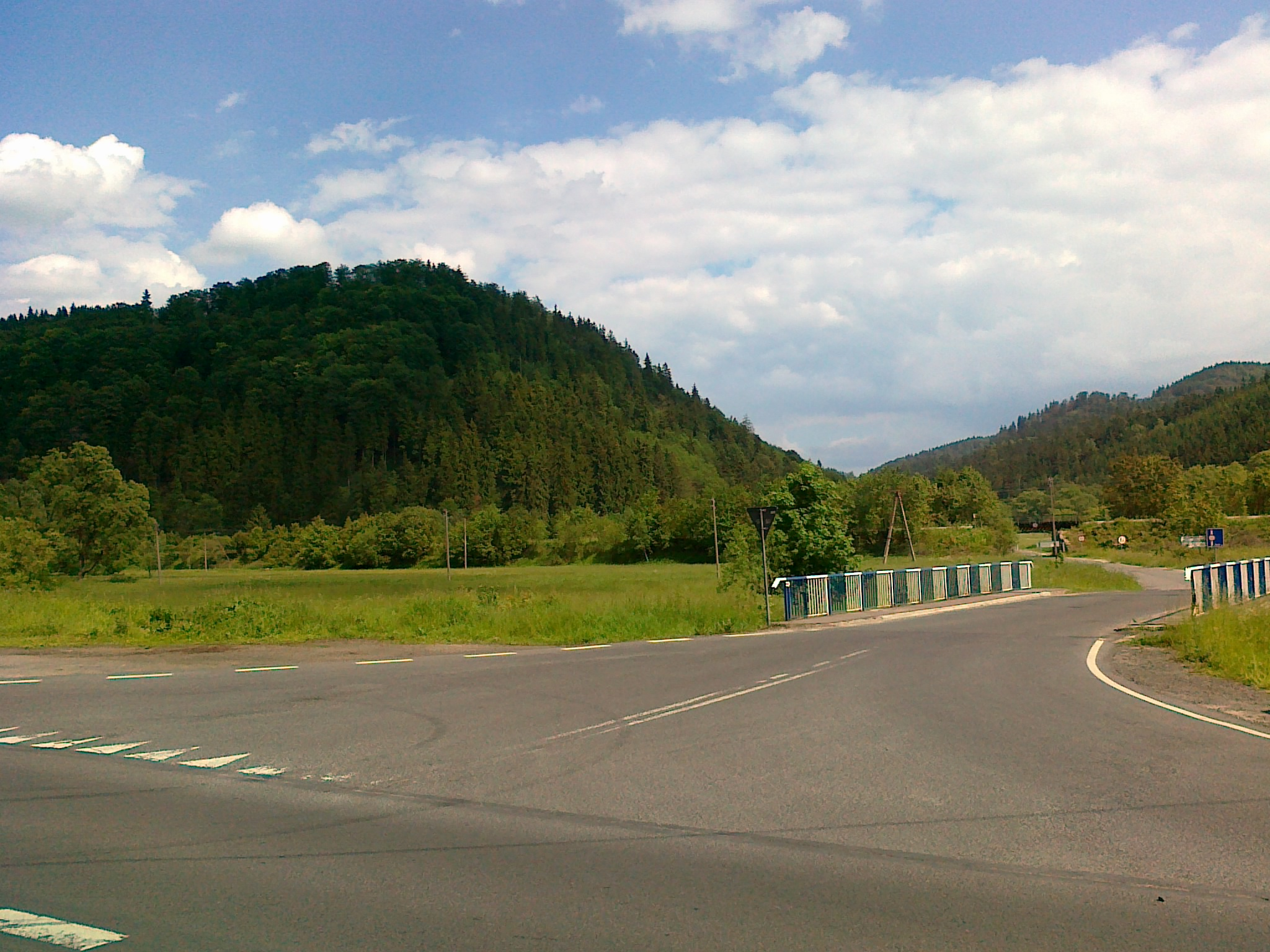

- Location within Poland
- Coordinates: 50°40′N 16°13′E
- Country: Poland
- Voivodeship: Lower Silesian
- County: Wałbrzych
- Gmina: Mieroszów

Kowalowa [kɔvaˈlɔva] is a village in the administrative district of Gmina Mieroszów, within Wałbrzych County, Lower Silesian Voivodeship, in south-western Poland.
