= Schaeffer's sign =

- Differential diagnosis: Pyramidal tract lesion

Schaeffer's sign is a clinical sign in which squeezing the Achilles tendon elicits an extensor plantar reflex. It is found in patients with pyramidal tract lesions, and is one of a number of Babinski-like responses.

The sign takes its name from the German neurologist Max Schaeffer (1852–1923).
