= Hermann Oppenheim =

German neurologist (1858–1919)

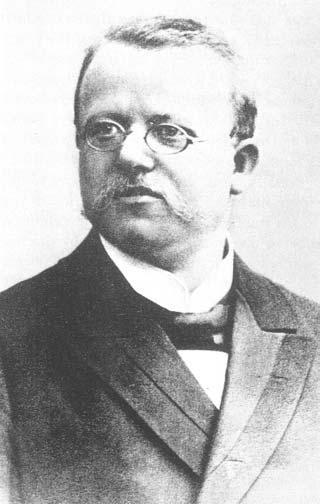
- Born: 1 January 1858; Warburg, Province of Westphalia, Kingdom of Prussia
- Died: 5 May 1919 (aged 61); Berlin, Province of Brandenburg
- Known for: Oppenheim's sign
- Scientific career
- Fields: Neurology
- Academic advisors: Karl Westphal

Hermann Oppenheim (1 January 1858 – 5 May 1919) was one of the leading neurologists in Germany.

== Life and work ==
Oppenheim was the son of Juda Oppenheim (1824–1891), the long-time rabbi of the Warburg synagogue community, and his wife, Cäcilie, née Steeg (1822–1898).

He studied medicine at the Universities of Berlin, Göttingen and Bonn. He started his career at the Charité-Hospital in Berlin as an assistant to Karl Westphal (1833–1890). In 1891 Oppenheim opened a successful private hospital in Berlin.

In 1894, Oppenheim was the author of a textbook on nervous diseases titled Lehrbuch der Nervenkrankheiten für Ärzte und Studierende, a book that soon became a standard in his profession. It was published in several editions and languages, and is considered one of the best textbooks on neurology ever written. He also published significant works on tabes dorsalis, alcoholism, anterior poliomyelitis, syphilis, multiple sclerosis and traumatic neurosis. In the field of physiology, he published articles on metabolism of urea with the aid of Nathan Zuntz (1847–1920).

In 1889 he published a treatise on traumatic neuroses that was harshly criticized by eminent physicians that included Jean-Martin Charcot (1825–1893) and Max Nonne (1861–1959); the reason being due to Oppenheim's assertion that psychological trauma caused organic changes that perpetuated psychic neuroses.

His expertise involving brain disease led directly to the first successful removal of a brain tumor, an operation that was performed by a physician named R. Köhler. With surgeon Fedor Krause (1857–1937), he reported the first successful removal of a pineal tumor.

He coined the term "dystonia musculorum deformans" for a type of childhood torsion disease he described, a disorder that was later to become known as "Ziehen-Oppenheim syndrome" (named along with German psychiatrist Theodor Ziehen 1862–1950). Also, another name for amyotonia congenita is "Oppenheim's disease".

His son Hans Oppenheim became an opera conductor and emigrated to Britain following the Nazi takeover.

== Selected writings ==
- Die traumatischen Neurosen nach den in der Nervenklinik der Charité in den letzten 5 Jahren gesammelten Beobachtungen. 1889; second edition, 1892; 3rd edition, 1918.
- Weitere Mitteilungen über die traumatischen Neurosen. 1891.
- Lehrbuch der Nervenkrankheiten für Ärzte und Studierende. two volumes, 1894; fifth edition, 1908; seventh edition, 1923. English translation as "Textbook of Nervous Disease". 1911, also translated into Russian, Spanish and Italian.
- De Geschwülste des Gehirns. 1896. also in Hermann Nothnagel's Handbuch der speciellen Pathologie und Therapie. 1896.
- Die syphilitischen Erkrankungen des Gehirns. in Hermann Nothnagel's Handbuch der speciellen Pathologie und Therapie. 1896.
- Die Encephalitis und der Hirnabszess. in Hermann Nothnagel's Handbuch der speciellen Pathologie und Therapie, 1897
- Psychotherapeutische Briefe. 1906; third edition, 1910.
- Operative Erfolge bei Geschwülsten der Sehhügel- under Vierhügel gegend. Berliner klinische Wochenschrift, 1913, 50: 2316–2322. (Successful removal of pineal tumour).
- Beiträge zur Kenntnis der Kriegsverletzungen des peripherischen Nervensystems. 1917.
- Die ersten Zeichen der Nervosität im Kindesalter. 1917.
- Stand und Lehre von kriegs- und Unfallneurosen. 1918. Obituary by Richard Cassirer (1868-1925), in Berliner klinische Wochenschrift, 1919, 52: 669–671.
