= Throckmorton's reflex =

- Differential diagnosis: pyramidal tract lesions

Throckmorton's reflex is a clinical sign in which pressure over the dorsal side of the metatarsophalangeal joint of the big toe elicits a plantar reflex. It is found in patients with pyramidal tract lesions, and is one of a number of Babinski-like responses.

The sign is named after Tom Bentley Throckmorton.
