= Ludwig Strümpell =

German philosopher (1812–1899)

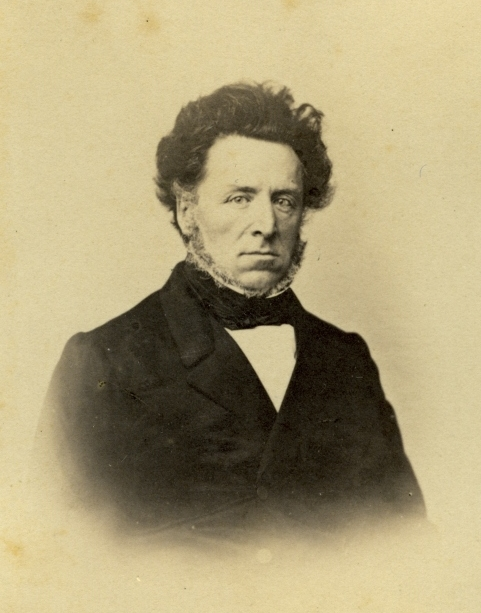
Ludwig Strümpell (ca. 1860)

Ludwig Strümpell, after his ennoblement in 1870 von Strümpell (28 June 1812 – 18 May 1899), was a German philosopher and pedagogue.

== Biography ==
Strümpell was born in Schöppenstedt in Lower Saxony, the son of a dyer. He studied philosophy at the University of Königsberg, where he was influenced by Johann Friedrich Herbart, and continued his studies at the University of Leipzig. In 1845, he became an associate professor of philosophy at the Imperial University of Dorpat (full professor, 1849), and after 1871 served as a professor at the University of Leipzig. He died in Leipzig in 1899 but was buried in his home town Schöppenstedt, which made him an honorary citizen (so far its only one).

He married Sophie, the sister of August Johann Gottfried Bielenstein (1826–1907), the distinguished Baltic German researcher of the Latvian language and culture, and had two children, Adolf and Emilie, the mother of the composer and paranormal researcher Emil Mattiesen

== Works ==
He became known as a prominent representative of Herbart's philosophy and published Erläuterungen zu Herbarts Philosophie (Explanations of Herbart's philosophy, 1834), Die Hauptpunkte der Herbartschen Metaphysik kritisch beleuchtet (The main points of Herbart's metaphysics critically illustrated, 1840), Gedanken über Religion und religiöse Probleme (Thoughts on religion and religious problems, 1888), Abhandlungen zur Geschichte der Metaphysik, Psychologie und Religionsphilosophie (Treatise on the history of metaphysics, psychology and the philosophy of religion, 1896), and Vermischte Abhandlungen aus der theoretischen und praktischen Philosophie (Miscellaneous treatise on topics from theoretical and practical philosophy, 1897).
