= Derby, Iowa =

- City
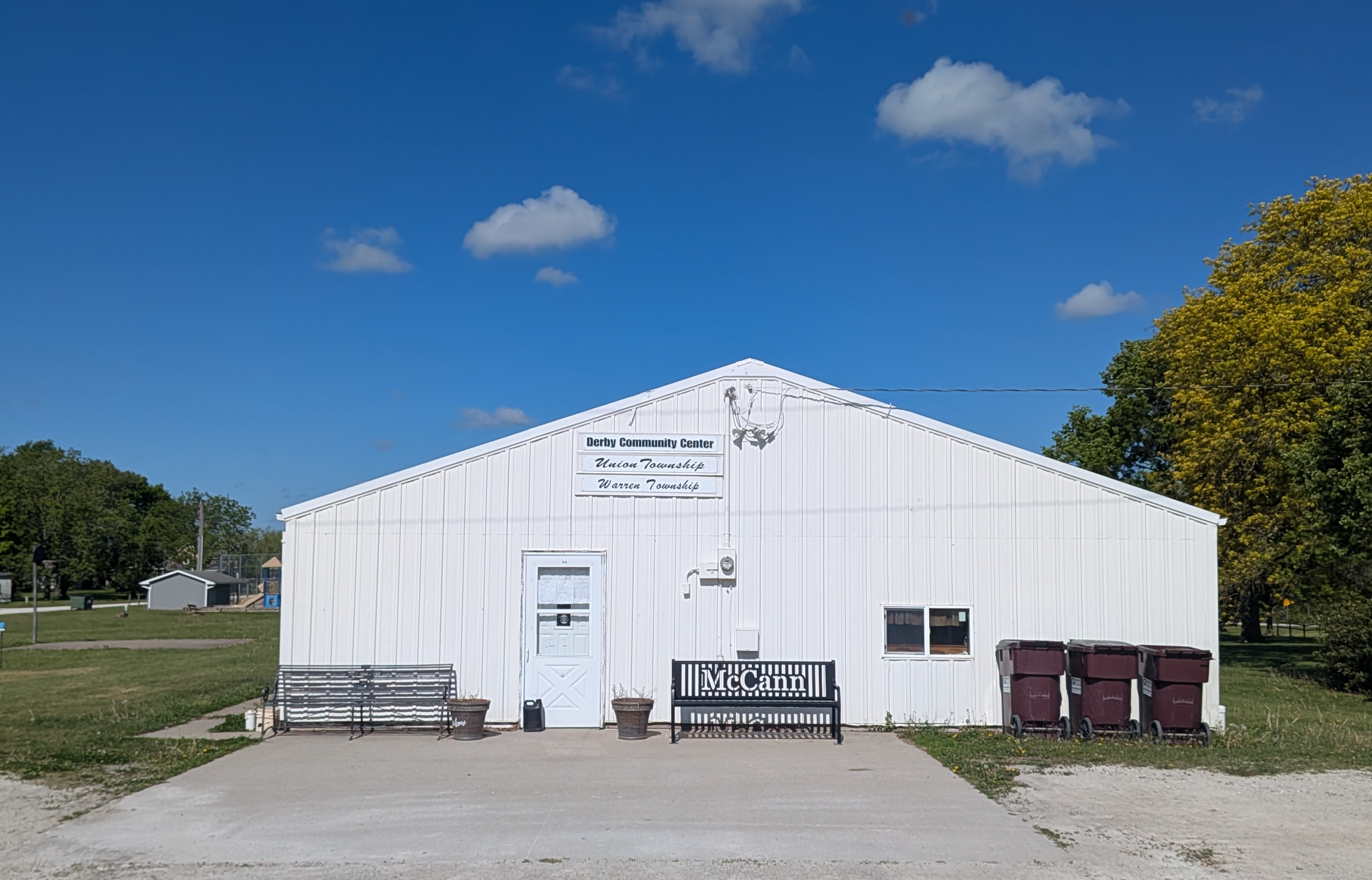
- Derby Community Center

- Location of Derby, Iowa
- Coordinates: 40°55′49″N 93°27′23″W
- Country: USA
- State: Iowa
- County: Lucas

Area
  - Total: 0.25 sq mi (0.66 km^{2})
  - Land: 0.25 sq mi (0.66 km^{2})
  - Water: 0 sq mi (0.00 km^{2})
- Elevation: 1,089 ft (332 m)

Population (2020)
  - Total: 90
  - Density: 352.5/sq mi (136.12/km^{2})
- Time zone: UTC-6 (Central (CST))
  - Summer (DST): UTC-5 (CDT)
- ZIP code: 50068
- Area code: 641
- FIPS code: 19-20125
- GNIS feature ID: 2394520

Derby is a city in Lucas County, Iowa, United States. The population was 90 at the time of the 2020 census.

== History ==
Derby was platted in 1872.

== Geography ==
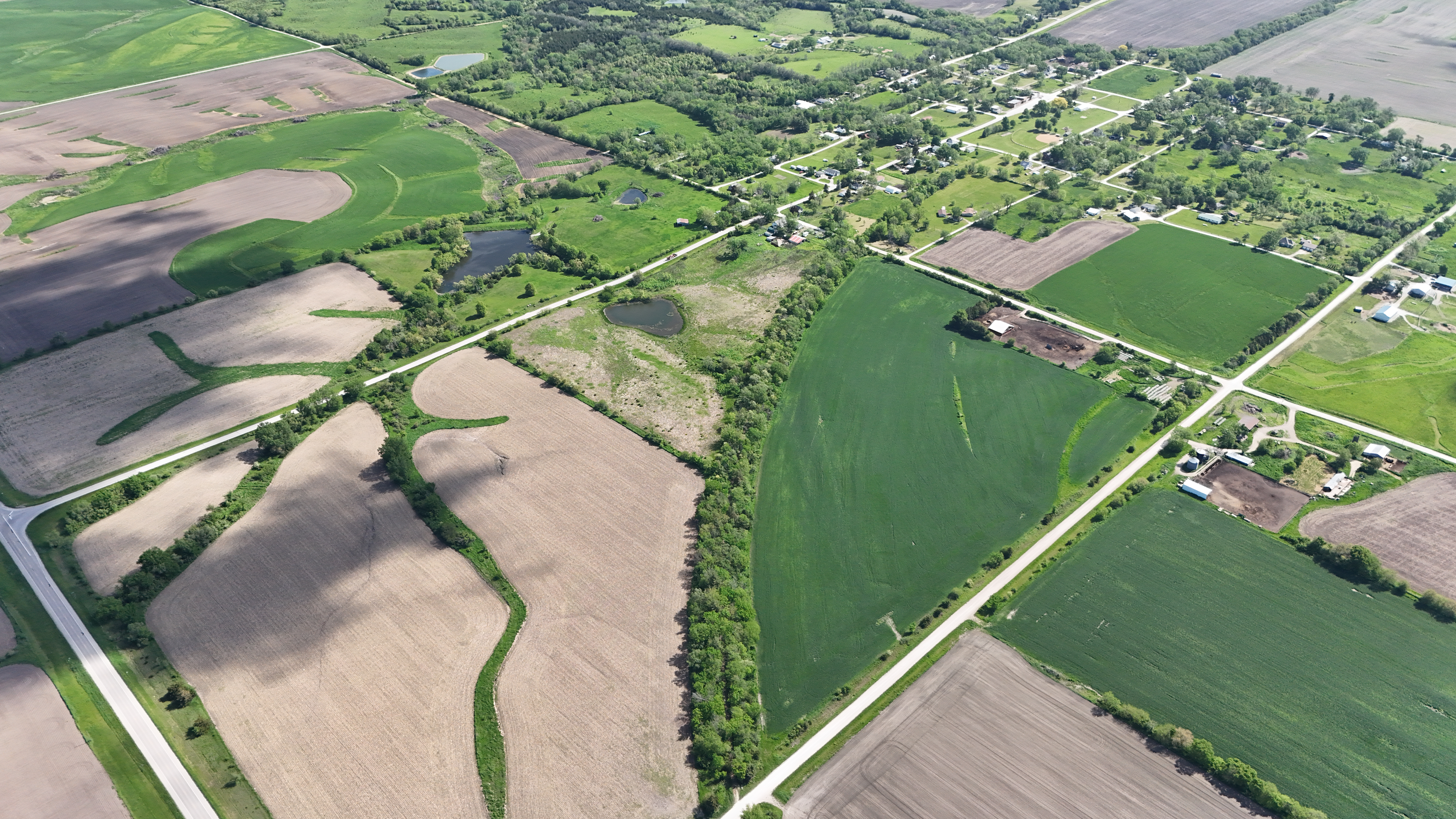
The tree-lined Cinder Path bike trail entering Derby from the west.

According to the United States Census Bureau, the city has a total area of 0.26 square miles (0.67 km^{2}), all land.

== Demographics ==
Historical populations
Year	Pop.	±%
1880	174	—
1910	326	+87.4%
1920	334	+2.5%
1930	280	−16.2%
1940	269	−3.9%
1950	194	−27.9%
1960	151	−22.2%
1970	161	+6.6%
1980	171	+6.2%
1990	135	−21.1%
2000	131	−3.0%
2010	115	−12.2%
2020	90	−21.7%
Source:"U.S. Census website". United States Census Bureau. and Iowa Data Center; Source: U.S. Decennial Census

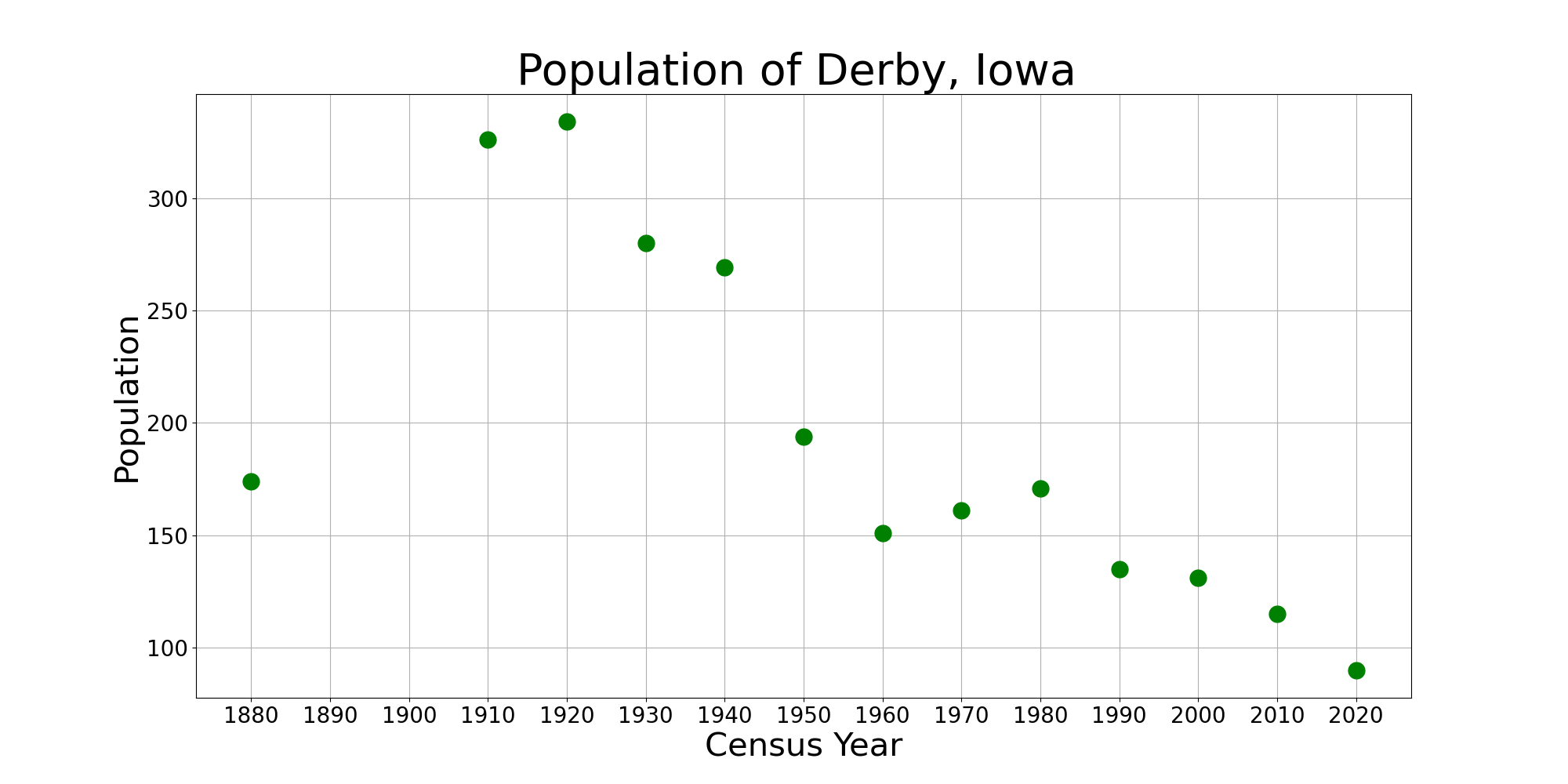
The population of Derby, Iowa from US census data

=== 2020 census ===
As of the census of 2020, there were 90 people, 37 households, and 29 families residing in the city. The population density was 352.5 inhabitants per square mile (136.1/km^{2}). There were 43 housing units at an average density of 168.4 per square mile (65.0/km^{2}). The racial makeup of the city was 98.9% White, 0.0% Black or African American, 0.0% Native American, 0.0% Asian, 0.0% Pacific Islander, 1.1% from other races and 0.0% from two or more races. Hispanic or Latino persons of any race comprised 4.4% of the population.

Of the 37 households, 37.8% of which had children under the age of 18 living with them, 54.1% were married couples living together, 0.0% were cohabitating couples, 16.2% had a female householder with no spouse or partner present and 29.7% had a male householder with no spouse or partner present. 21.6% of all households were non-families. 21.6% of all households were made up of individuals, 10.8% had someone living alone who was 65 years old or older.

The median age in the city was 41.0 years. 30.0% of the residents were under the age of 20; 3.3% were between the ages of 20 and 24; 23.3% were from 25 and 44; 21.1% were from 45 and 64; and 22.2% were 65 years of age or older. The gender makeup of the city was 46.7% male and 53.3% female.

=== 2010 census ===
As of the census of 2010, there were 115 people, 47 households, and 31 families living in the city. The population density was 442.3 inhabitants per square mile (170.8/km^{2}). There were 55 housing units at an average density of 211.5 per square mile (81.7/km^{2}). The racial makeup of the city was 99.1% White and 0.9% from two or more races.

There were 47 households, of which 31.9% had children under the age of 18 living with them, 53.2% were married couples living together, 8.5% had a female householder with no husband present, 4.3% had a male householder with no wife present, and 34.0% were non-families. 25.5% of all households were made up of individuals, and 10.7% had someone living alone who was 65 years of age or older. The average household size was 2.45 and the average family size was 2.97.

The median age in the city was 41.5 years. 24.3% of residents were under the age of 18; 3.6% were between the ages of 18 and 24; 25.2% were from 25 to 44; 31.3% were from 45 to 64; and 15.7% were 65 years of age or older. The gender makeup of the city was 51.3% male and 48.7% female.

=== 2000 census ===
As of the census of 2000, there were 131 people, 53 households, and 34 families living in the city. The population density was 497.6 inhabitants per square mile (192.1/km^{2}). There were 63 housing units at an average density of 239.3 per square mile (92.4/km^{2}). The racial makeup of the city was 100.00% White.

There were 53 households, out of which 20.8% had children under the age of 18 living with them, 45.3% were married couples living together, 13.2% had a female householder with no husband present, and 35.8% were non-families. 34.0% of all households were made up of individuals, and 18.9% had someone living alone who was 65 years of age or older. The average household size was 2.47 and the average family size was 3.21.

In the city, the population was spread out, with 26.0% under the age of 18, 6.1% from 18 to 24, 26.0% from 25 to 44, 22.1% from 45 to 64, and 19.8% who were 65 years of age or older. The median age was 39 years. For every 100 females, there were 111.3 males. For every 100 females aged 18 and over, there were 110.9 males.

The median income for a household in the city was $26,667, and the median income for a family was $31,250. Males had a median income of $23,333 versus $14,500 for females. The per capita income for the city was $10,605. There were 6.1% of families and 4.5% of the population living below the poverty line, including no under eighteens and 9.5% of those over 64.

== Education ==
Mormon Trail Community School District operates schools serving the community.

== Notable person ==
- Lester J. Dickinson, U.S. Representative and U.S. Senator was born in Derby.
- Jeannette Throckmorton (1883–1963), American physician, quilter; born in Derby.
