= Sokołowsko =

- Village
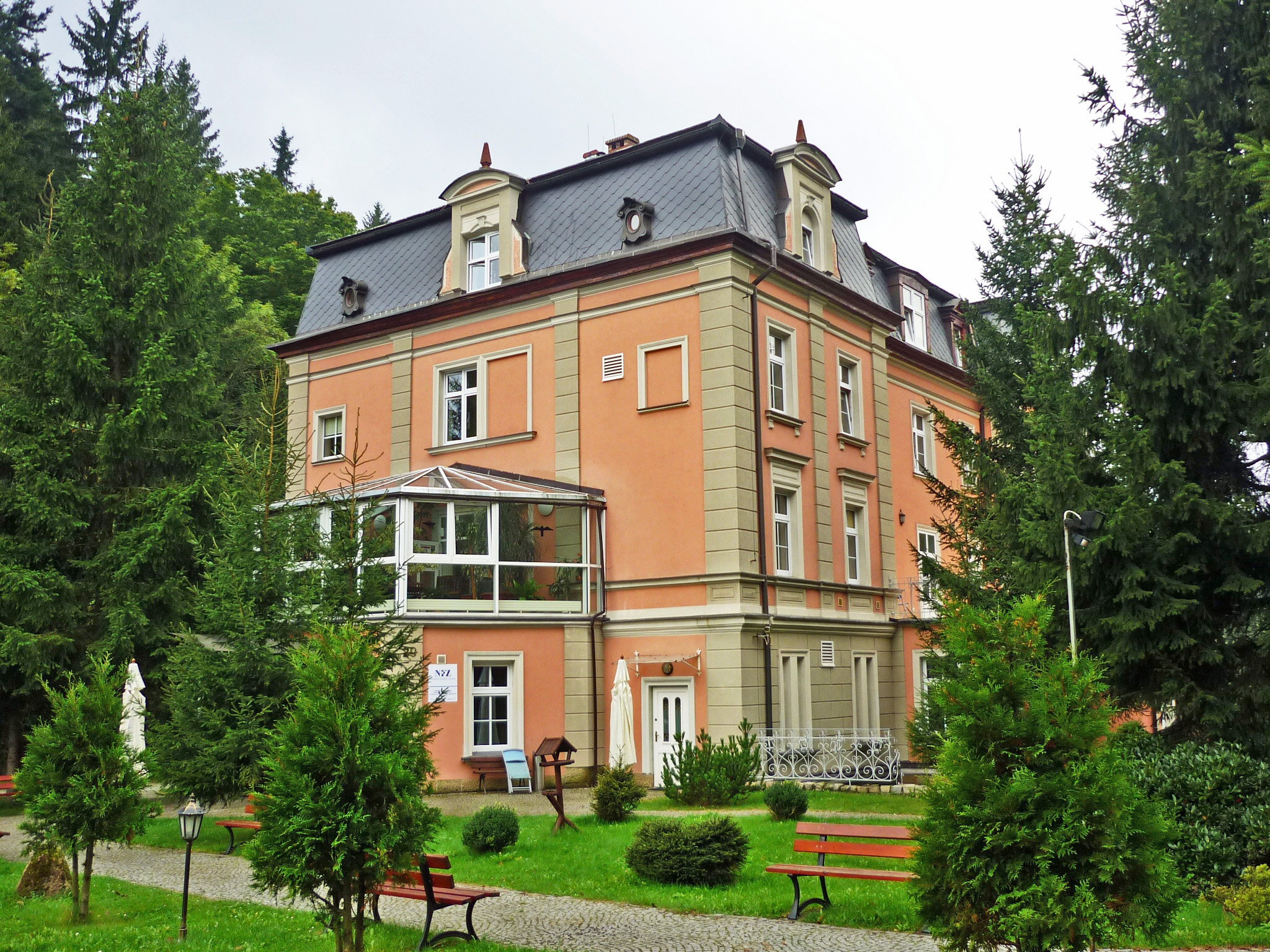
- Sanatorium Chrobry in Sokołowsko

- Location within Poland
- Coordinates: 50°41′11″N 16°14′7″E
- Country: Poland
- Voivodeship: Lower Silesian
- County: Wałbrzych
- Gmina: Mieroszów
- First mentioned: 1357
- Highest elevation: 590 m (1,940 ft)
- Lowest elevation: 540 m (1,770 ft)

Population
  - Total: 880
- Time zone: UTC+1 (CET)
  - Summer (DST): UTC+2 (CEST)
- Postal code: 58-351
- Vehicle registration: DBA
- Website: http://www.sokolowsko.pl/

Sokołowsko [sɔkɔˈwɔfskɔ] is a village and traditional climatic health resort in Gmina Mieroszów, within Wałbrzych County, Lower Silesian Voivodeship, in south-western Poland.

== Geography ==
Sokołowsko is the largest village within the Stone Mountains of the Central Sudetes. It is situated in a deep forest-covered hollow traversed by the Sokołowiec and Dziczy streams, at an altitude of 540 metres (1,772 ft) above sea level. The border with the town of Meziměstí in the Czech Republic is about 3 km (2 mi) in the south.

Sokołowsko is surrounded by several forested mountains, predominantly made up from porphyry rocks: Stożek Mały (750 m (2,460 ft)) in the north-west and Masyw Bukowca (898 m (2,946 ft)) in the north-east, as well as Garbatka (797 m (2,615 ft)) in the south-west, Włostowa (903 m (2,963 ft)) in the south and south-east and Radosno (776 m (2,546 ft)) in the east. The range offers numerous trails for hiking and cross-country skiing in winter.

== History ==
It is difficult to indicate the exact foundation date of the village. The area had originally been part of the County of Kłodzko, acquired by Bohemia under Duke Soběslav I in 1137. His successors of the Přemyslid dynasty became hereditary Bohemian kings by order of Emperor Frederick II in 1212 and promoted the German Ostsiedlung. Sokołowsko was probably founded about 1250 by monks of the Benedictine Order at Police, a filial monastery of Břevnov Abbey in Prague.

The first record of Girbrechtsdorff is documented in a 1357 deed itemising the villages within the burgraviate of Radosno castle (German: Freudenburg), that fell to the Piast Duke Bolko II the Small of Świdnica shortly afterwards, whose duchy in turn was finally incorporated as a Silesian fief of the Bohemian crown in 1392. During the 15th century Görbersdorf had several possessors and suffered from the Hussite Wars. Together with the southern part of the former Duchy of Świdnica the village passed to the Imperial counts of Hoberg (Hochberg) at Książ, the later Princes of Pless. With the Bohemian Kingdom the area fell to the Habsburg monarchy in 1526 and was seized by Prussia under King Frederick II in the First Silesian War of 1742. From 1815 Görbersdorf was part of the Prussian Province of Silesia.

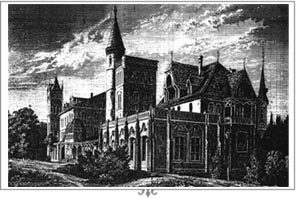
Brehmer's sanatorium, late 1870s

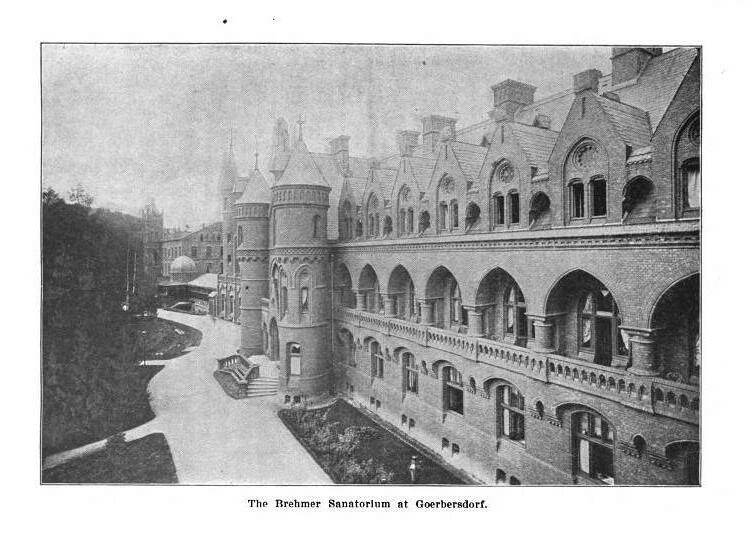
Brehmer sanatorium, photo before 1904

Görbersdorf didn't differentiate from neighbouring villages until it was visited in 1849 by Countess Maria von Colomb, a niece of Prussian General Gebhard Leberecht von Blücher. The countess, delighted by the scenery, persuaded her brother-in-law Hermann Brehmer to establish a health resort for consumptive patients. In 1854 she and Brehmer opened the world's first sanatorium for the treatment of tuberculosis at Görbersdorf. The care included the Priessnitz method of hydrotherapy and also a precursory method of climatic-dietetic treatment was applied. The treatment of consumption practised by Alexander Spengler at Davos, perpetuated by Thomas Mann's novel The Magic Mountain, was modelled after Görbersdorf, which at times was called the "Silesian Davos," although perhaps Davos should be called the "Swiss Görbersdorf." The resort was relatively expensive, but well organised, and before 1888 it had both a post office and phone lines. At the same time the quantity of 730 curates well exceeded the number of inhabitants. Several further sanatoriums were established in the following years and until World War I, Görbersdorf had become popular with guests from all over Europe, who had numerous mansions and even a Russian Orthodox chapel erected. At the beginning of the 20th century Scandinavian guests introduced snow skiing and a ski jumping hill was opened in 1930.

=== Post World War II ===
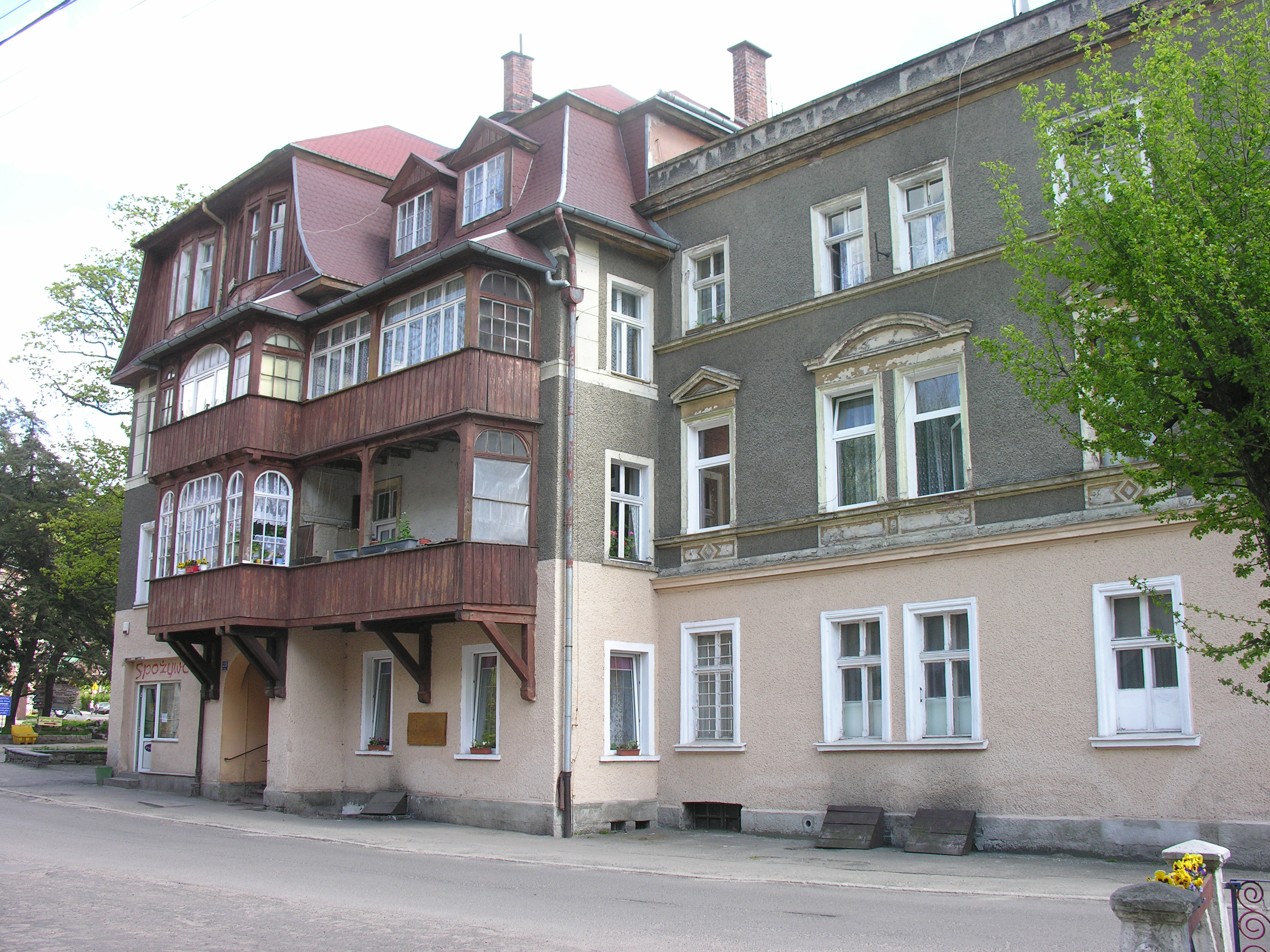
Former home of filmmaker Krzysztof Kieślowski

In 1945 Görbersdorf, now belonging to Poland, was named Sokołowsko in honour of the Polish internist Alfred Sokołowski who had been a close co-worker of Hermann Brehmer. The now-called Grunwald sanatorium has continued to operate as a public anti-consumptive resort, while large parts of the facilities decayed. On the initiative of medical director Stanisław Domin the treatment profile was broadened to all kind of lung diseases, later also dementia. The filmmaker Krzysztof Kieślowski, whose father suffered from tuberculosis, spent several years of his youth at Sokołowsko.

In the 1970s the settlement was being transformed into Provincial Centre of Winter Sports, but due to lack of resources the project was not completed. Sokołowsko didn't regain its village status until the beginning of the 21st century. In the recent years, some of the mansions were renovated. The Russian Orthodox Archangel Michael chapel has been rebuilt by the Catholic Renovabis organisation.

== In popular culture ==
Nobel Prize-winning Polish novelist Olga Tokarczuk's 2022 novel The Empusium: A Health Resort Horror Story (Polish: Empuzjon. Horror przyrodoleczniczy) is set in a fictionalized version of the Sokołowsko sanatorium in 1913.
