= Unisław Śląski =

- Village
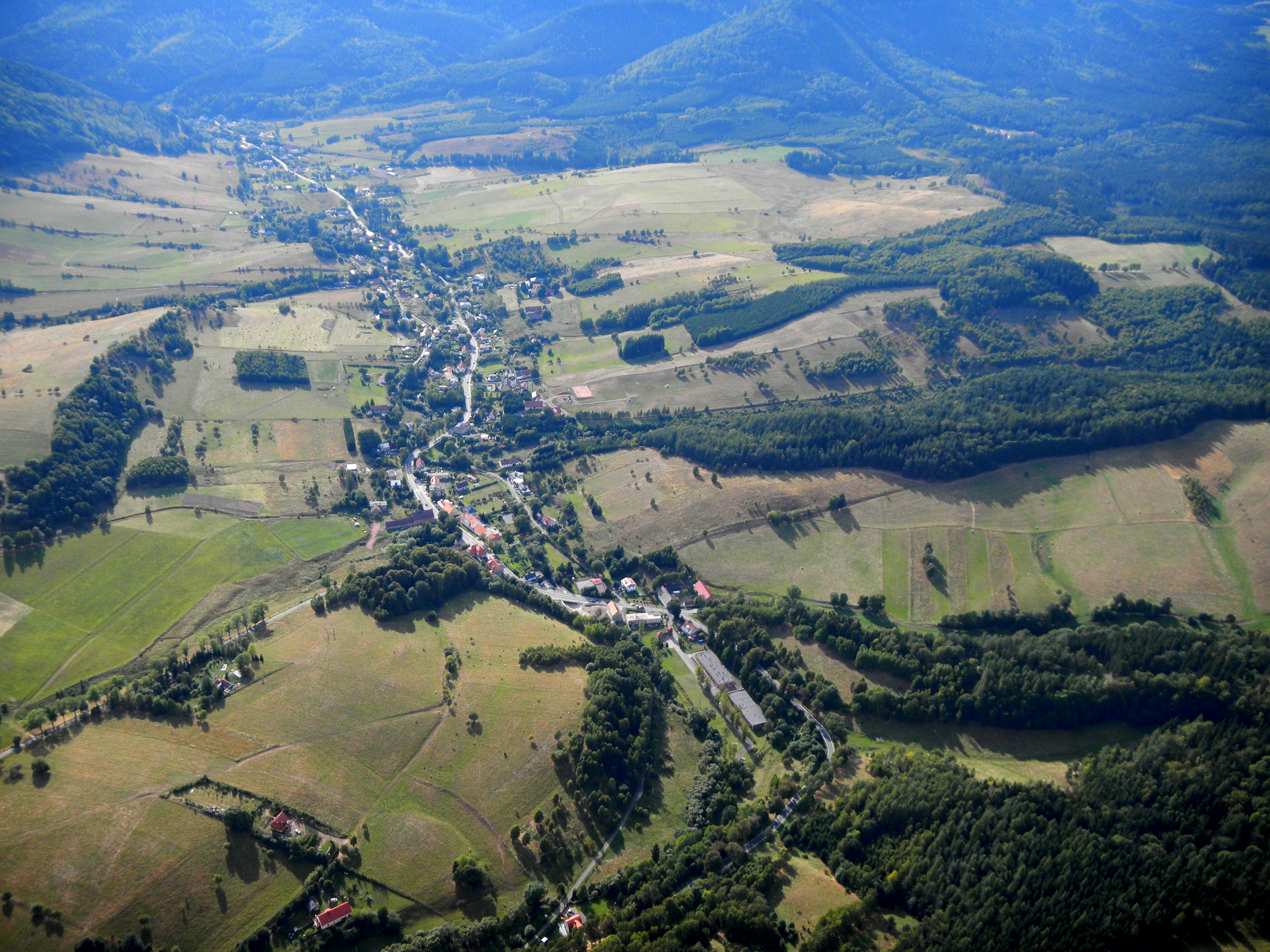
- Aerial view of Unisław Śląski

- Location within Poland
- Coordinates: 50°43′N 16°14′E
- Country: Poland
- Voivodeship: Lower Silesian
- County: Wałbrzych
- Gmina: Mieroszów
- Time zone: UTC+1 (CET)
  - Summer (DST): UTC+2 (CEST)
- Postal code: 58-352
- Vehicle registration: DBA

Unisław Śląski (Polish pronunciation: [uˈɲiswaf ˈɕlɔ̃skʲi]) is a village in the administrative district of Gmina Mieroszów, within Wałbrzych County, Lower Silesian Voivodeship, in south-western Poland. It is situated on the Ścinawka River.

== Sights ==
Main historic sights include the Gothic Catholic Church of the Assumption, ruins of an 18th-century Lutheran church, and a 19th-century railway tunnel.

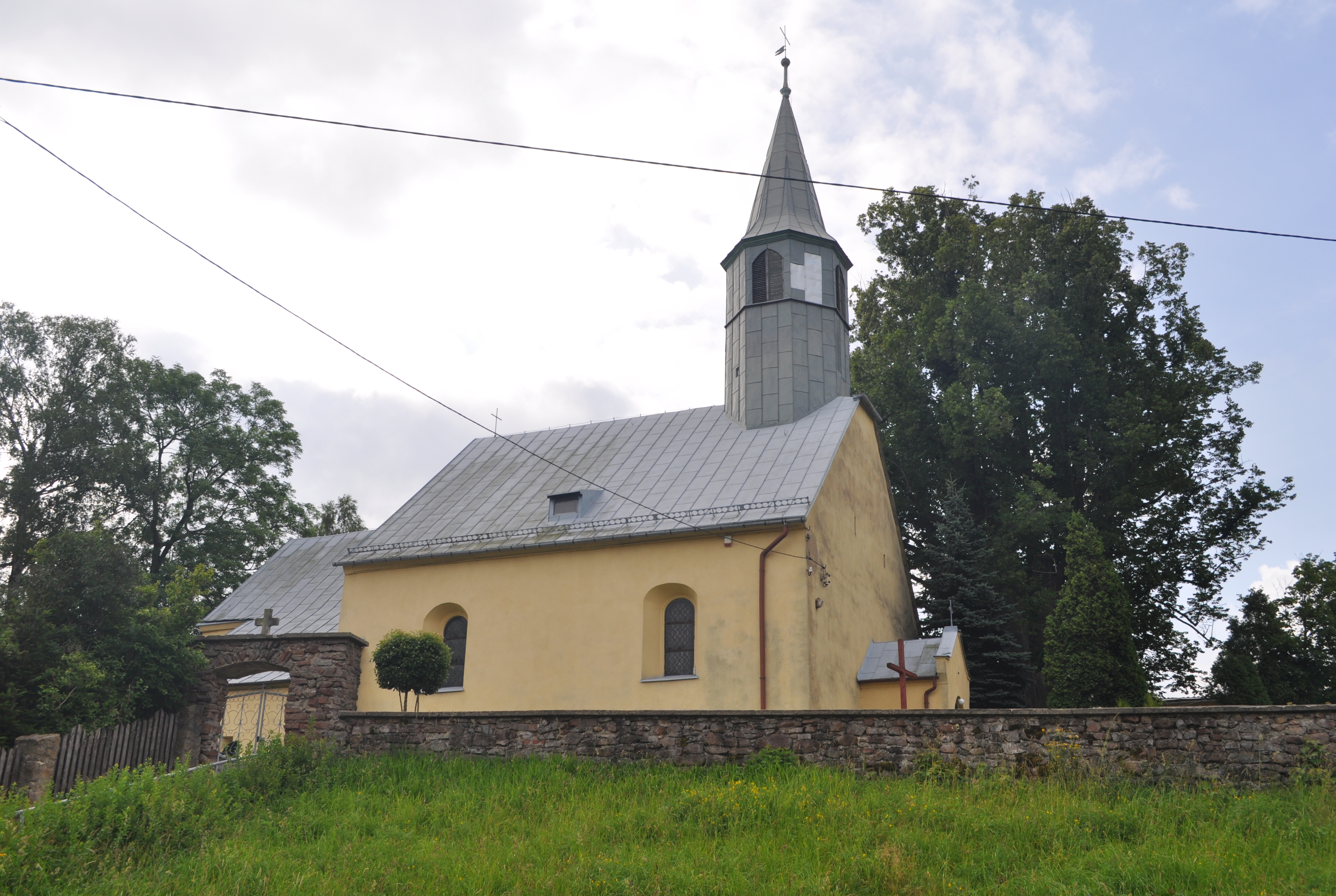
Catholic Church of the Assumption

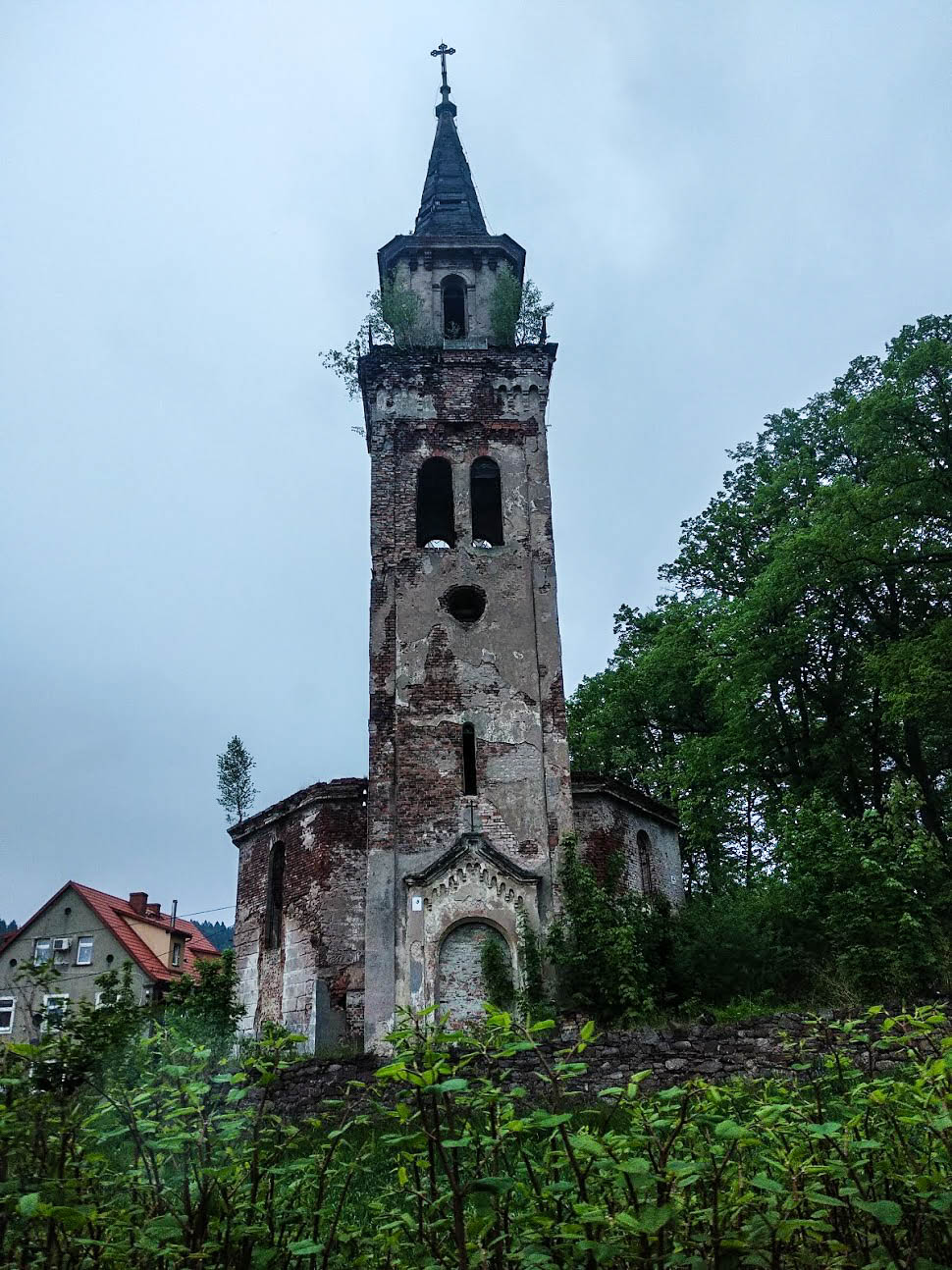
Lutheran church ruins

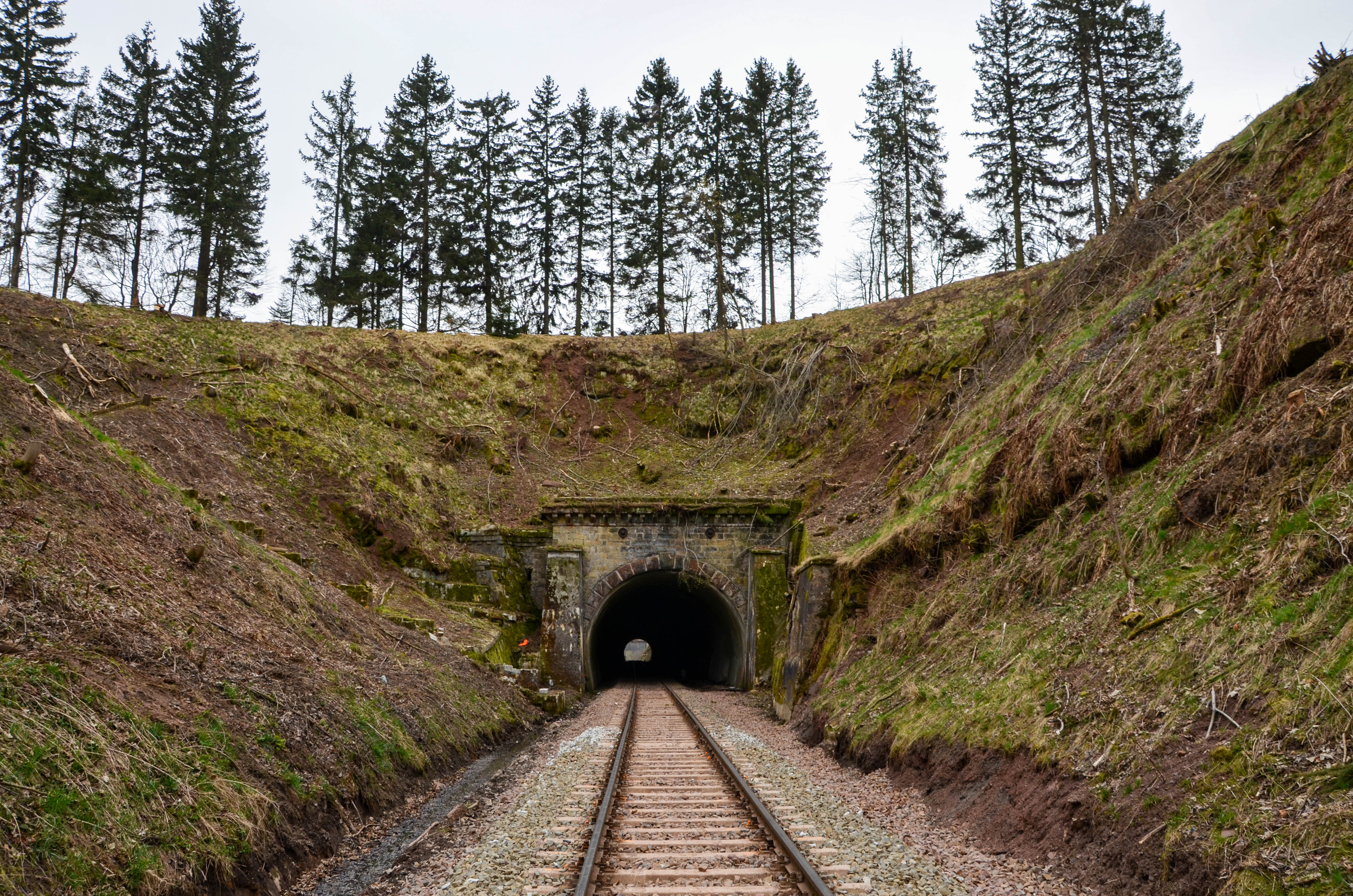
Railway tunnel

== Transport ==
There is a railway stop in the village.

== Cannabalism ==
In Langwaltersdorf, today's Unisław Śląski, a macabre crime described all over the world took place. The shocking story took place in the summer of 1895, when the crime was committed by a German woman.
