= Alfred Sokołowski =

Polish pulmonologist

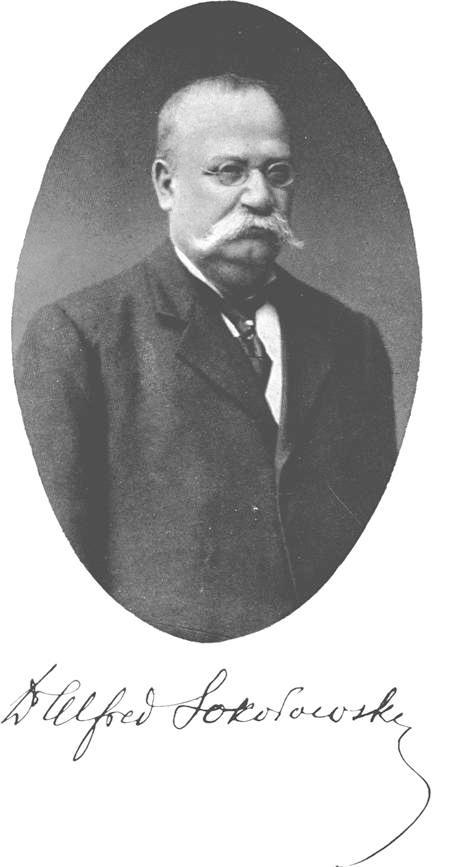
Alfred Sokołowski

Alfred Marcin Sokołowski (11 November 1849 in Włodawa - 8 March 1924 in Warsaw) was a Polish pulmonologist and professor of the University of Warsaw. He specialised in the field of Phthisiatry (study of tuberculosis) and he was one of the pioneers of modern treatment to diseases of the respiratory system.

In 1908 founded the Towarzystwo Przeciwgruźlicze. He contributed to the spread of medical knowledge about the disease, and he opened a treatment clinic in Zakopane. From 1880 until his death he worked in the editorial "Gazeta Lekarska" (Doctor's Newspaper) and his expert knowledge of tuberculosis produced many high quality journals on the subject. In 1914, Stanford University awarded him the title of Doctor honoris causa for his contributions to the field of phthisiatry.

He died in 1924, but after World War II, the village of Sokołowsko was named after him.

== Bibliography ==
- Alfred Sokolowski. Beiträge zur Klinik der Tuberkulose 37, 3, 1917 doi:10.1007/BF01869536
