= Łączna, Wałbrzych County =

Łączna
- Village
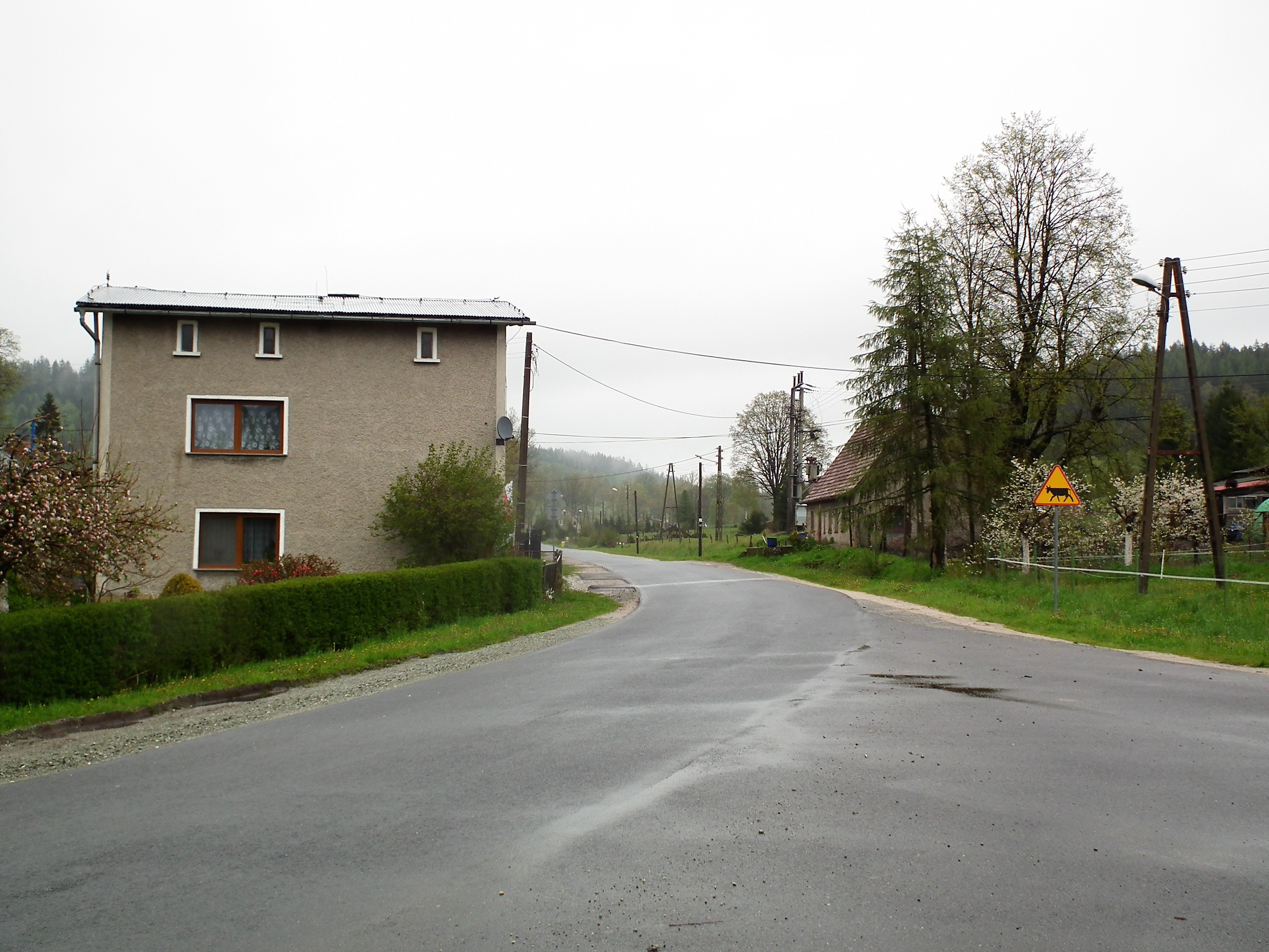

- Location within Poland
- Coordinates: 50°40′16″N 16°08′27″E
- Country: Poland
- Voivodeship: Lower Silesian
- County: Wałbrzych
- Gmina: Mieroszów
- Elevation: 570 m (1,870 ft)
- Population: 140

Łączna [ˈwɔnt͡ʂna] is a village in the administrative district of Gmina Mieroszów, within Wałbrzych County, Lower Silesian Voivodeship, in south-western Poland, near the border with the Czech Republic.
