= Różana, Wałbrzych County =

Różana
- Village
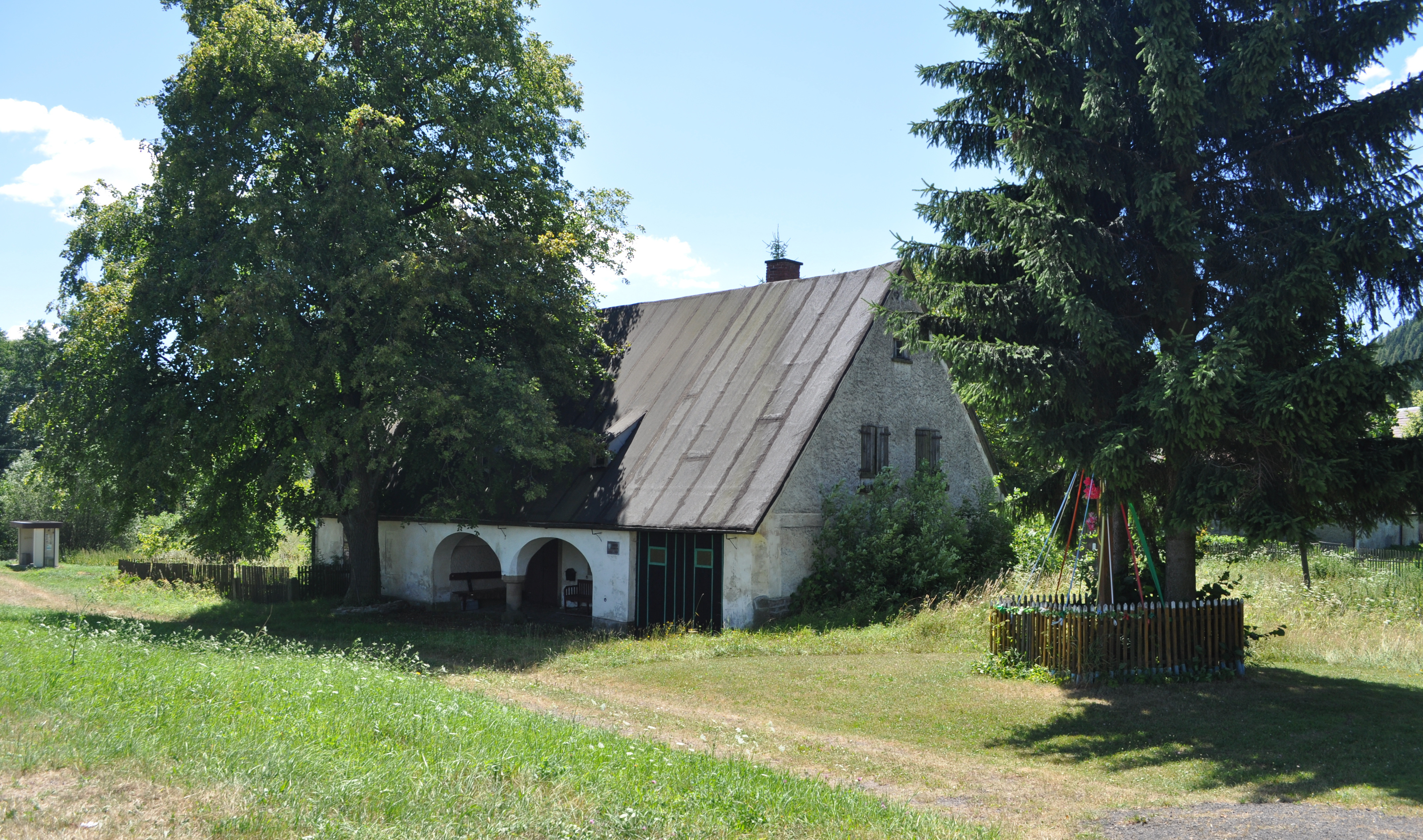

- Location within Poland
- Coordinates: 50°41′N 16°10′E
- Country: Poland
- Voivodeship: Lower Silesian
- County: Wałbrzych
- Gmina: Mieroszów

Różana [ruˈʐana] is a village in the administrative district of Gmina Mieroszów, within Wałbrzych County, Lower Silesian Voivodeship, in south-western Poland.
