= Golińsk =

- Village
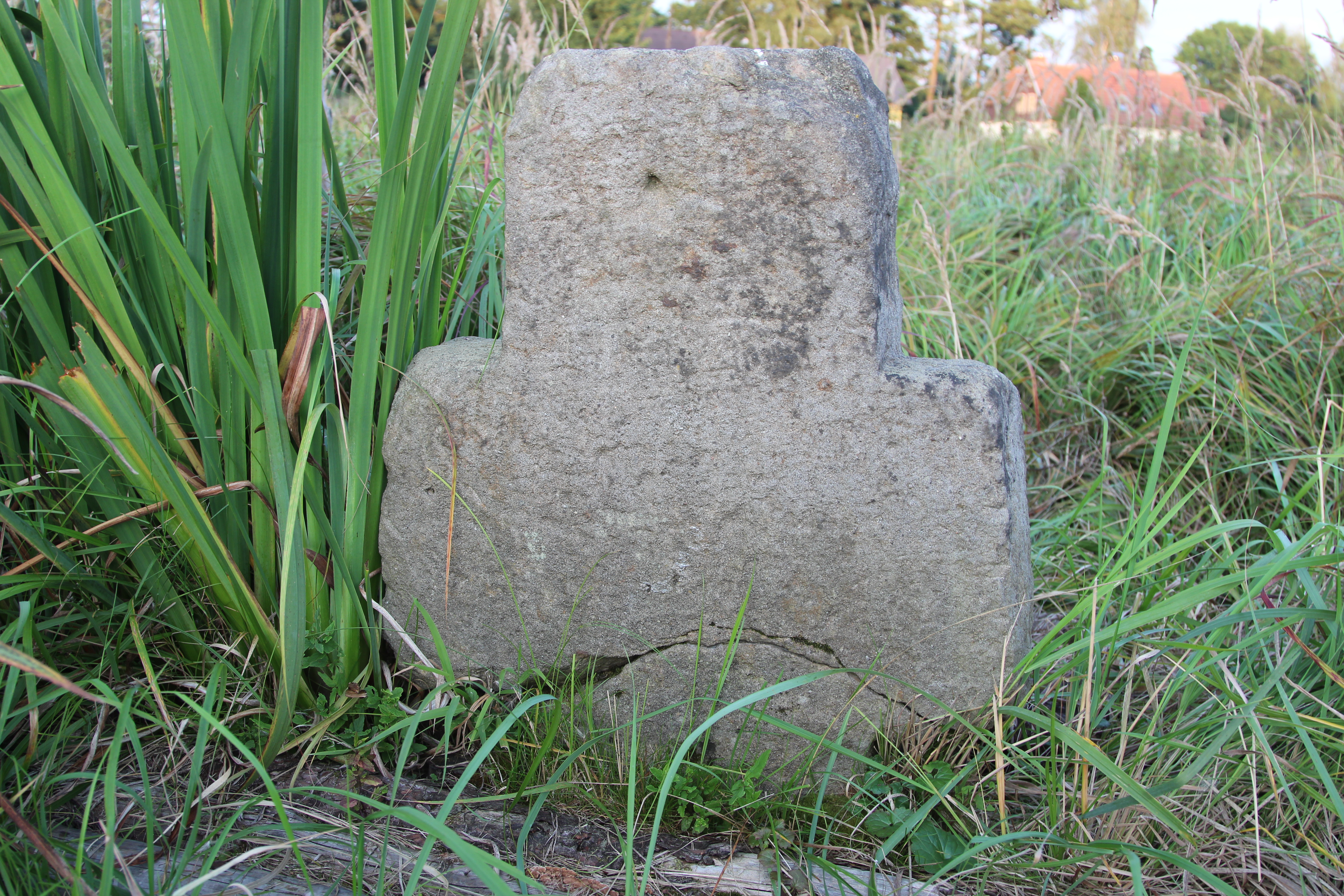
- Medieval stone cross in Golińsk

- Location within Poland
- Coordinates: 50°38′36″N 16°12′38″E
- Country: Poland
- Voivodeship: Lower Silesian
- County: Wałbrzych
- Gmina: Mieroszów
- Time zone: UTC+1 (CET)
  - Summer (DST): UTC+2 (CEST)
- Postal code: 58-350
- Vehicle registration: DBA

Golińsk [ˈɡɔliɲsk] is a village in the administrative district of Gmina Mieroszów, within Wałbrzych County, Lower Silesian Voivodeship, in south-western Poland, near the border with the Czech Republic.

It was the birthplace of Günther Viezenz, German Oberleutnant who singlehandedly destroyed 21 enemy tanks during the Second World War, receiving the tank destruction badge four times in gold and once in silver along with other decorations.
