= Adolf Strümpell =

Baltic German neurologist

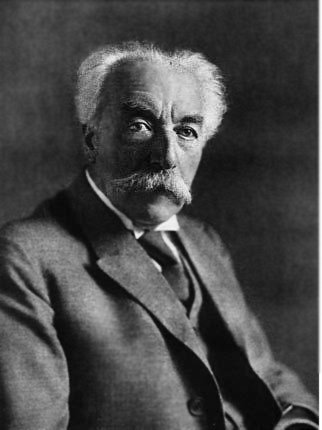
- Adolf Strümpell (1853–1925)
- Born: 29 June 1853; Neu-Autz Estate, Courland Governorate (now Latvia)
- Died: 10 January 1925 (aged 71); Leipzig, Saxony
- Known for: Ankylosing spondylitis Strümpell–Lorrain disease
- Scientific career
- Fields: Neurology

Ernst Adolf Gustav Gottfried Strümpell, from 1893 von Strümpell (29 June 1853 – 10 January 1925), was a Baltic German neurologist.

== Life ==
Strümpell was born in Neu-Autz, Courland (the present Jaunauce, Latvia), the son of the philosopher Ludwig Strümpell (1812–1899).

After study in Dorpat and Leipzig, in 1875 he received his medical doctorate from the University of Leipzig, where he had as instructors Carl Wunderlich (1815–1877), Karl Thiersch (1822–1895) and Carl Ludwig (1816–1895). In 1883 he was an associate professor at Leipzig, and from 1886 to 1903 was a full professor at the University of Erlangen, succeeding Wilhelm Olivier Leube (1842–1922) as director of the medical clinic. Afterwards he was a professor at the Universities of Breslau (from 1903), Vienna (from 1909) and Leipzig (from 1910), where in 1915 he was appointed rector.

Along with French neurologist Pierre Marie, he is credited with identifying and diagnosing an arthritic spinal deformity that was to become known as the Marie–Strümpell disease (ankylosing spondylitis). Together with French physician Maurice Lorrain, the eponymous Strümpell–Lorrain disease is named, which is an hereditary spastic paraplegia.

In 1884 Strümpell published a textbook on internal medicine that was based on his experiences. This publication, Lehrbuch der speziellen Pathologie und Therapie der inneren Krankheiten, was then considered to be the definitive textbook in Germany in regards to internal medicine. It comprised a subvolume on neurological diseases, which became a guiding manual for the training in neurology for decades. It was published in more than thirty editions and was translated into numerous languages (into English in 1887).

Strümpell's wide-ranging research involved tabes dorsalis, spinal cord diseases, infantile paralysis, acromegalia, and progressive muscular atrophy. Most of his medical articles were published in the journal Deutsche Zeitschrift für Nervenheilkunde, of which he was co-publisher along with Wilhelm Heinrich Erb (1840–1921), Friedrich Schultze (1848–1934) and Ludwig Lichtheim (1845–1928).
