= Drug Quality and Security Act =

- Long title: To amend the Federal Food, Drug, and Cosmetic Act with respect to human drug compounding and drug supply chain security, and for other purposes.
- Announced in: the 113th United States Congress
- Sponsored by: Rep. Fred Upton (R, MI-6)
- Number of co-sponsors: 10

Citations
- Public law: Pub. L. 113–54 (text) (PDF)

Codification
- Acts affected: Federal Food, Drug, and Cosmetic Act, Public Health Service Act, Comprehensive Drug Abuse Prevention and Control Act of 1970, Atomic Energy Act of 1954, and others.
- U.S.C. sections affected: 21 U.S.C. § 353, 5 U.S.C. § 553, 21 U.S.C. § 353a, 18 U.S.C. § 1365, 21 U.S.C. § 331, and others.
- Agencies affected: United States Congress, Government Accountability Office, Nuclear Regulatory Commission, Department of Health and Human Services, Food and Drug Administration
- Authorizations of appropriations: an unlimited amount in fiscal 2014 to be spent at any time

Legislative history
- Introduced in the House as H.R. 3204 by Fred Upton (R–MI) on September 27, 2013; Committee consideration by United States House Committee on Energy and Commerce; Passed the House on September 28, 2013 (voice vote); Passed the Senate on November 18, 2013 (voice vote); Signed into law by President Barack Obama on November 27, 2013

The Drug Quality and Security Act (H.R. 3204) is a law that amended the Federal Food, Drug, and Cosmetic Act to grant the Food and Drug Administration more authority to regulate and monitor the manufacturing of compounded drugs. The bill was written in response to the New England Compounding Center meningitis outbreak that took place in 2012, which killed 64 people. The bill was signed by President Obama on November 27, 2013.

Title I of the DQSA comprises the Compounding Quality Act (CQA), which amends regulations concerning compounding drugs. Title II, the Drug Supply Chain Security Act (DSCSA), established requirements to facilitate the tracing of prescription drug products through the pharmaceutical supply distribution chain. These requirements included a ten-year timeline culminating in the building of "an electronic, interoperable system to identify and trace certain prescription drugs as they are distributed in the United States."

== Background ==
The bill was introduced by Rep. Upton in response to the New England Compounding Center meningitis outbreak that took place in 2012. 64 people were killed and 750 were infected by fungal meningitis. Rep. Upton's district had 3 deaths and there were 19 total in Michigan.

Compounding is the creation of a particular pharmaceutical product to fit the unique need of a patient. To do this, compounding pharmacists combine or process appropriate ingredients using various tools. This may be done for medically necessary reasons, such as to change the form of the medication from a solid tablet to a liquid, to avoid a non-essential ingredient that the patient is allergic to, or to obtain the exact dose(s) needed or deemed best of particular active pharmaceutical ingredient(s). It may also be done for more optional reasons, such as adding flavors to a medication or otherwise altering taste or texture.

== Parts ==
Title I of the law amended the Federal Food, Drug, and Cosmetic Act to grant the Food and Drug Administration more authority to regulate and monitor the manufacturing of compounded drugs. The act also prohibited reselling drugs that are labeled "not for resale." Title II of the DQSA was passed with the intent to "make it easier to trace drugs throughout the U.S. supply chain" in part by outlining the steps "to build an electronic, interoperable system to identify and trace certain prescription drugs as they are distributed in the United States" by 2023.

The below summary is based largely on the summary provided by the Congressional Research Service, a public domain source.

=== Title I: Compounding Quality Act (CQA) ===
Title I of the Drug Quality and Security Act, the Compounding Quality Act, amends the Federal Food, Drug, and Cosmetic Act (FFDCA) with respect to the regulation of compounding drugs. The act exempts compounded drugs from new drug requirements, labeling requirements, and track-and-trace requirements of the DCSCA if the drug is compounded by or under the direct supervision of a licensed pharmacist in a pharmacy or in a registered outsourcing facility and meets applicable requirements. The act also created a new category of regulated entity: human drug compounding outsourcing facilities.

A typical community pharmacy (503A), or specialty pharmacy (503A) may compound only under specific conditions as noted in section 503A of the FD&C Act. A significant portion of the provision that allows this states the compounded product is subject to a prescription requirements for an individual. This is the subject of an official guidance document with the FDA.

Compounding may occur either extemporaneously upon the presentation of a valid prescription or order, or by anticipatory compounding, which would be compounding before the existence of a prescription order. Compounding may be completed only pursuant to a valid patient order and may not be completed for 'office use' or prescriber general use. In the case of office use, a prescriber may utilize compounded products from a 503B outsourcing facility registered with the FDA according to the act. Alternatively a physician may administer or order compounded products from a 503A pharmacy for certain reasons including acute care and inpatient status patients, but subject to the valid order clauses.

In the case of extemporaneous compounding, a pharmacy may compound on the presentation of a valid patient order according to provisions in the FD&C Act.

For anticipatory compounding a pharmacy may compound: “limited quantities before the receipt of a valid prescription order for such individual patient” if: 1. The compounding is based on a history of the licensed pharmacist or licensed physician receiving valid prescription orders for the compounding of the human drug product; and 2. The orders have been generated solely within an established relationship between the licensed pharmacist or licensed physician and either such patient for whom the prescription order will be provided or the physician or other licensed practitioner who will write such prescription order.

Under section 503B of the FD&C Act, a human drug compounder can elect to register with the Food and Drug Administration (FDA) as an outsourcing facility. An outsourcing facility is defined as “a facility at one geographic location or address that (i) is engaged in the compounding of sterile drugs; (ii) has elected to register as an outsourcing facility; (iii) and complies with all of the requirements of this section.” (Section 503B(d)(4) of the FD&C Act.)

CQA authorizes FDA to assess and collect fees from entities that register with FDA as outsourcing facilities. FDA spends fee revenues to hire, support, and maintain personnel for the oversight of these outsourcing facilities. Outsourcing facilities are subject to current good manufacturing practice (CGMP) requirements under section 501(a)(2)(B) of the FD&C Act and will be inspected by FDA on a risk-based schedule (see sections 503B(a) and 503B(b)(4)). Drug products compounded by or under the direct supervision of a licensed pharmacist at an outsourcing facility may be able to qualify for exemptions from the following three sections of the FD&C Act: (1) section 505 (concerning FDA approval of drugs); (2) section 502(f)(1) (concerning the labeling of drug products with adequate directions for use); and section 582 (concerning the drug supply chain security requirements). An outsourcing facility is not required to be a licensed pharmacy and may or may not obtain patient-specific prescriptions.

To qualify for the exemptions, certain conditions must be met. For example, outsourcing facilities must report the drugs that they compound, as well as certain adverse events, to FDA. They must not compound drugs that are essentially copies of one or more approved drugs, and the compounded drugs must not be sold or transferred by an entity other than the outsourcing facility that compounded them. CQA lists the conditions under which drugs compounded by outsourcing facilities can qualify for the exemptions in section 503B and is available on FDA's website.

Under CQA, outsourcing facility fees shall be used to supplement and not supplant any other federal funds available to carry out the activities relating to outsourcing facility oversight (section 744K(d) and section 744K(e)). Therefore, the fees are used to augment appropriations that FDA uses for oversight of outsourcing facilities. CQA requires FDA to submit an annual report to Congress no later than 120 days after each fiscal year (section 744K(h) of the FD&C Act). As required by statute, this report presents: 1) a description of fees assessed; 2) a description of fees collected; 3) a summary description of entities paying the fees; 4) a description of the hiring and placement of new staff; 5) a description of the use of fee resources to support inspecting outsourcing facilities; and 6) the number of inspections and reinspections of facilities performed each year.

The act also revised compounding pharmacy requirements to repeal prohibitions on advertising and promotion of compounded drugs by compounding pharmacies and repealed the requirement that prescriptions filled by a compounding pharmacy be unsolicited.

The act requires the Comptroller General (GAO) to report on pharmacy compounding and the adequacy of state and federal efforts to assure the safety of compounded drugs.

=== Title II: Drug Supply Chain Security Act (DSCSA) ===
Title II of the act, the Drug Supply Chain Security Act (DSCSA), established requirements to facilitate the tracing of prescription drug products through the pharmaceutical supply distribution chain.

Under DSCSA, the Secretary is required to establish standards for the exchange of transaction documentation, including transaction information, transaction history, and transaction statements. The Secretary must also establish processes to: (1) provide waivers of requirements, including for undue economic hardship or emergency medical reasons; (2) provide exceptions to requirements relating to product identifiers if a product is packaged without sufficient space to bear the information; and (3) determine other products or transactions that should be exempt from the requirements of the act.

==== Requirements ====
The act established requirements for drug manufacturers, wholesalers, dispensers, and repackagers:

- Manufacturers, wholesalers, dispensers, and repackagers are required to ensure that all prior transaction information is provided at each transfer of ownership.
- In the event of a recall or for the purpose of investigating a suspect product or an illegitimate product, manufacturers, wholesale distributors, dispensers, and repackagers are required to provide within a reasonable time the applicable transaction documentation upon request by the Secretary or other appropriate federal or state official.
- Manufacturers and repackagers are required to affix or imprint a product identifier on each package and homogeneous case intended to be introduced in a transaction into commerce except for products that are required to have a standardized numerical identifier.
- Manufacturers, wholesale distributors, dispensers, and repackagers are all required to ensure that each of their trading partners are authorized.
- Manufacturers, wholesale distributors, dispensers, and repackagers are required to implement systems to: (1) investigate suspect products; and (2) handle illegitimate products, including through quarantine, disposal, and appropriate notice to the Secretary and, as necessary, trading partners.
- Manufacturers, wholesale distributors, and repackagers are required to verify returned products before further distribution.

Summary of Requirements and Affected Parties
Requirement	Manufacturer	Repackager	Wholesaler	Dispenser
Provide prior transaction information at each transfer of ownership	Yes	Yes	Yes	Yes
Provide transaction documentation the event of a recall or for the purpose of investigating a suspect product or an illegitimate product	Yes	Yes	Yes	Yes
Ensure that all of one's trading partners are authorized	Yes	Yes	Yes	Yes
Affix or imprint a product identifier on each package and homogeneous case	Yes	Yes	No	No
Implement systems to investigate suspect products and handle illegitimate products	Yes	Yes	Yes	Yes
Verify returned products before further distribution	Yes	Yes	Yes	No

The act contains a provision that allows a dispenser to enter into a written agreement with a third party, including an authorized wholesale distributor, that requires the third party to maintain confidentially any information and statements required to be maintained. The Secretary is required to provide for alternative methods of compliance with such additional drug distribution security requirements.

The act preempts state and local requirements related to tracing drugs through the distribution system, and licensure of wholesale distributors and third party logistics providers.

==== 2023 timeline ====
Section 203 of the act prescribes additional requirements related to the tracing of products at the package level (enhanced drug distribution security) to enter into effect by November 27, 2023.

Under this section, the Secretary is required to: (1) establish one or more pilot projects and hold public meetings to enhance the safety and security of the pharmaceutical distribution supply chain, (2) issue a final guidance document that outlines and makes recommendations with respect to the system attributes necessary to enable secure tracing at the package level, and (3) identify and make recommendations with respect to the standards necessary for adoption in order to support the secure interoperable electronic data exchange among the pharmaceutical distribution supply chain that comply with a form and format developed by a widely recognized international standards development organization. The act also requires the Secretary to establish standards for the licensing of wholesale distributors and third party logistics providers.

In November 2019, the regulatory milestone requiring wholesalers to verify the authenticity of product returns was delayed by the FDA for one year.

==== FDA pilot project program ====
In 2016, public meetings were held to discuss proposed design objectives of pilot projects. In 2019, the FDA announced a DSCSA Pilot Project Program and selected 20 participants. These included standards organizations and industry associations, manufacturers, wholesale distributors, logistics providers, and dispensers. At least six of the pilots involved the use of blockchain technologies. In 2020, 16 of the pilots released their findings to the public.

== Procedural history ==
The Drug Quality and Security Act was introduced in the United States House of Representatives on September 27, 2013, by Rep. Fred Upton (R, MI-6). It was referred to the United States House Committee on Energy and Commerce. The House voted on September 28, 2013, to pass the bill in a voice vote.

The Drug Quality and Security Act was received in the Senate on September 30, 2013. The Senate began working on the bill on November 12, 2013. They voted 97–1 to begin working on the bill; Senator Vitter was the only "no" vote. The Senate passed the bill without amendments on November 18, 2013.

The bill was presented to President Obama on November 21, 2013, and signed into law on November 27.

== Debate and discussion ==
The Hill reported that the bill had "broad bipartisan support" in both the House and the Senate.

=== Vitter filibuster ===
Senator David Vitter (R-LA) filibustered the bill, using that tactic to try to get the Senate to vote on the Show Your Exemption Act. That bill would require Senators and Representatives to "disclose which of their staff they have exempted from enrolling in insurance through the ObamaCare health exchange." Majority Leader Harry Reid criticized this move, insisting that the Drug Quality and Security Act was more important to finish. Reid also vowed not to "let one senator dictate what goes on here in the Senate."

== See also ==
- List of bills in the 113th United States Congress
- Drugs in the United States
- New England Compounding Center meningitis outbreak
- Drug distribution
