= New England Compounding Center meningitis outbreak =

Ongoing fungal meningitis outbreak in the US

Coordinates: 42.27320°N 71.42708°W

New England Compounding Center (NECC) meningitis outbreak
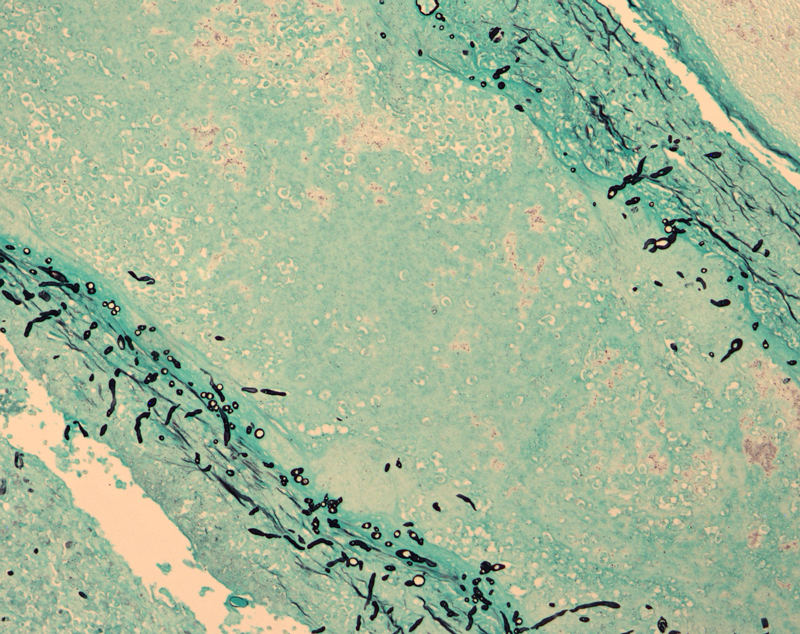
- Fungal cells (black lines) in infected brain tissue (cyan)
- Date: September 21, 2012 (on-going)
- Location: United States (23 States)
- Cause: Fungal contamination of steroid medication
- Deaths: 64 to 100+
- Injuries: 689
- Litigation: 400+ lawsuits filed against NECC

A New England Compounding Center meningitis outbreak that began in September 2012 sickened 798 individuals and resulted in the deaths of 64 people. In September 2012, the Centers for Disease Control and Prevention, in collaboration with state and local health departments and the Food and Drug Administration (FDA), began investigating a multistate outbreak of fungal meningitis and other infections among patients who had received contaminated steroid injections from the New England Compounding Center (NECC) in Framingham, Massachusetts. The NECC was classified as a compounding pharmacy. The traditional role of compounding pharmacies is to make drugs prescribed by doctors for specific patients with needs that can't be met by commercially available drugs.

In October 2012, an investigation of the NECC revealed the company had been in violation of its state license because it had been functioning as a drug manufacturer, producing drugs for broad use rather than filling individual prescriptions. In December 2012, federal prosecutors charged 14 former NECC employees, including president Barry Cadden and pharmacist Glenn Chin, with a host of criminal offenses. It alleged that from 2006 to 2012, NECC knowingly sent out drugs that were mislabeled and unsanitary or contaminated.

In a congressional hearing the FDA Commissioner was asked why regulators at the FDA and the Massachusetts Board of Pharmacy did not take action against the pharmacy years earlier. The legislators were told that the agency was obligated to defer to Massachusetts authorities, who had more direct oversight over pharmacies. The FDA Commissioner also stated, "In light of growing evidence of threats to the public health, the administration urges Congress to strengthen standards for non-traditional compounding." The Drug Quality and Security Act (H.R. 3204, 113th Congress), a bill to grant the FDA more authority to regulate and monitor the manufacturing of compounding drugs, became law on November 27, 2013.

The incident resulted in numerous lawsuits against NECC. In May 2015, a $200 million settlement plan was approved that set aside funds for victims of the outbreak and their families.

== Outbreak ==
In September 2012, an outbreak of fungal meningitis was reported in the United States. The U.S. Centers for Disease Control and Prevention traced the outbreak to fungal contamination in three lots of a medication called methylprednisolone used for epidural steroid injections. The medication was packaged and marketed by the New England Compounding Center (NECC), a compounding pharmacy in Framingham, Massachusetts. Doses from these three lots had been distributed to 75 medical facilities in 23 states, and doses had been administered to about 14,000 patients after May 21 and before September 24, 2012. Patients began reporting symptoms in late August, but, because of the unusual nature of the infection, clinicians did not begin to realize the cases had a common cause until late September. Infections other than meningitis were also associated with this outbreak, which spanned 19 states. As of March 10, 2013, 48 people had died and 720 were being treated for persistent fungal infections. In November 2012, some patients recovering from meningitis were reported to be experiencing secondary infections at the injection site. Although no cases of infection were reported to be associated with any other lots of medication, all lots of all medications distributed by NECC were recalled in separate actions by NECC and regulators. Subsequent analysis identified some contamination in other lots.

On October 9, 2012, members of the United States Congress asked federal health officials for briefings on the outbreak as a first step toward possible legislative action to strengthen federal drug safety regulations. On November 14, 2012, members of a congressional committee investigating the outbreak accused the Food and Drug Administration (FDA) of failing to prevent the crisis by moving too slowly against the Massachusetts pharmacy. FDA commissioner Margret Hamburg testified that the agency's efforts to address problems at the compounding center had been hamstrung by Congressional interference, conflicting court rulings regarding FDA jurisdiction, and tenacious litigation by the compounding center itself. At the same hearing, the co-owner of NECC chose to plead the Fifth, refusing to answer all questions. By mid-December, over 400 lawsuits had been filed against NECC.

In October 2012, Massachusetts shut down two more compounding pharmacies over sterility concerns after they conducted a surprise inspection. In December, unexpected inspections of three more Massachusetts pharmacies found problems as well.

On December 21, 2012, the New England Compounding Center filed for Chapter 11 bankruptcy protection in the Massachusetts district bankruptcy court.

On September 4, 2014, pharmacist Glenn Adam Chin was arrested at Boston's Logan International Airport before boarding a plane headed to Hong Kong, and was charged with one count of mail fraud. Chin was responsible for supervising the clean rooms at the NECC and was involved in compounding the contaminated methylprednisolone. The FDA affidavit stated that Chin had used improper sterilization and testing techniques, unsafe practices, falsified cleaning logs, and ordered pharmacy technicians to fraudulently mislabel vials. Chin was the first to be charged in the ongoing inquiry.

On December 17, 2014, 14 former NECC executives and technicians, including co-founder and president Barry Cadden, were indicted on a host of federal charges related to the outbreak. Most seriously, Cadden and Chin were charged with helping orchestrate a massive racketeering conspiracy that led directly to 25 of the deaths.

== Source of infectious agents ==
The Centers for Disease Control and Prevention (CDC) traced the outbreak to contaminated methylprednisolone (MPA) used for epidural steroid injections. The Food and Drug Administration (FDA) examined foreign materials from unopened vials under microscope and found fungal matter. The fungus was found in the cerebrospinal fluid of several patients, which confirmed fungus caused the meningitis. The medication was packaged and marketed by the New England Compounding Center (NECC) of Framingham, Massachusetts.

According to the CDC, between May 21 and September 24, 2012, patients in 23 U.S. states received injections from three implicated lots of a steroid, preservative-free methylprednisolone acetate, for back pain, and some of these patients developed symptoms consistent with fungal meningitis. This form of meningitis can be caused by epidurally administered medications, but is not contagious by person-to-person contact. On October 9, authorities estimated as many as 14,000 patients may have been exposed to the contaminated drug.

The NECC said that immediately after it was notified about the infections it initiated a voluntary recall on September 26. Next, on October 4, the Massachusetts Department of Public Health issued a recall of all NECC medications, advising hospitals and clinics to remove and segregate all lots from their stock inventory. NECC also announced on that day they were suspending all of their operations and voluntarily surrendered their licenses to the Massachusetts Department of Health and Human Services, while continuing to cooperate with the ongoing investigations by the CDC and the FDA.

On October 15, the FDA issued a warning that two more drugs may have been contaminated. Both came from NECC. One was a steroid called triamcinolone acetonide and another was a product used during heart surgery. If injected, the second steroid may cause fungal meningitis, while the heart drug may cause a different fungal infection.

== Infectious agents ==
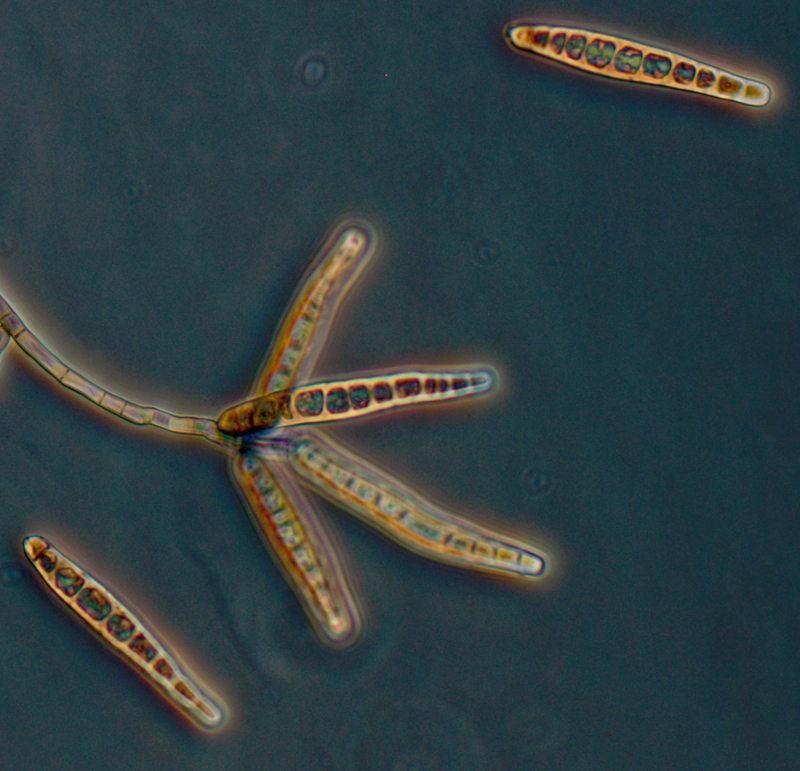
Exserohilum rostratum

As of November 15, the CDC reported that 85 patients had laboratory-confirmed fungal infections. A black mold called Exserohilum rostratum was found in 84 of the cases and Aspergillus fumigatus was found in one case. Other fungi were found in eight cases, but were not known to be significant. According to specialists in fungal diseases, cases of meningitis caused by Aspergillus are rare, but cases caused by black mold are even more so, making the discovery of the outbreak and the recommended treatment almost entirely untrodden medical ground.

Aspergillus is a common mold genus that humans and animals are continually breathing, but that rarely causes problems. However, in patients with suppressed immune systems, or if introduced directly into the spinal column, the fungus can be deadly. Despite the availability of antifungal agents, aspergillosis in the central nervous system carries a poor prognosis. Though this case sparked the nationwide investigation, as of November 4, the CDC said A. fumigatus had been identified in only one patient. Almost all cases in the outbreak involved a different fungus, Exserohilum rostratum, another common mold that rarely causes problems.

== Clinical features ==
On October 12, 2012, the CDC reported that as of that date, the median age of the patients was 68 years (range: 23–91 years); 48 (69%) were female. At presentation, 57 (81%) had headache, 24 (34%) had fever, 21 (30%) had nausea, and seven (10%) had photophobia (intolerance to bright light). Atypical neurologic symptoms were observed in a minority of patients, subtle gait disturbances were seen in three (4%), and a history of falls was described in eight (11%). Meningeal signs, including nuchal rigidity (the inability to flex the neck forward), Kernig's sign, or Brudzinski's sign, were uncommon, occurring in 10 (14%) patients. Stroke, either as a presenting sign, or as a complication of infection, occurred in 12 (17%).

According to the CDC report, for 61 people with symptom onset date available, the earliest date was August 18. For the 48 patients with both injection date and symptom onset date available for analysis, the median time from last steroid injection to onset of symptoms was 15 days (range: 1–42). A total of 25 of the 48 patients received a single steroid injection; the median time from injection to onset of symptoms for those patients was 16 days (range: 4–42). People who received injections were most vulnerable to stroke and infection within the first 42 days of injection, but three months may be needed for symptoms to appear.

Fungal infections associated with nonepidural injections were also reported. They were related to injections in a peripheral joint space, such as a knee, shoulder, or ankle. People injected in peripheral joints were at risk for joint infections but were not believed to be at risk for meningitis.

On November 4, some people who were treated for meningitis and released returned to the hospital with abscesses, a localized infection of the tissues at the injection site, that could lead to meningitis. The deputy chief of the mycotic diseases branch of the CDC said, "We don't have a good handle on how many people are coming back. We are just learning about this and trying to assess how best to manage these patients. They're very complicated." As of December 7, spinal abscesses had been reported in 23 patients who received injections in Tennessee, and 37 patients in Michigan.

The CDC reported that doctors were also reporting that some people that had been injected with the contaminated drugs had arachnoiditis, a nerve inflammation that can cause intense pain, bladder problems, and numbness.

In 2017, five years after the outbreak, NPR reported that "hundreds of people around the country are still suffering from complications linked to injections of tainted medicine". NPR interviewed patients who had recovered but still experience debilitating aftereffects such as pain, extreme fatigue, mental confusion and inability to concentrate. One woman who had been very active before her illness remains bedridden and on oxygen.

== Treatment ==
Few clinicians were accustomed to dealing with fungal meningitis due to its rarity. The CDC convened an expert advisory panel to develop recommended treatment guidelines. Many affected patients were elderly and had other existing health problems further making the choice of treatment difficult. On October 23, 2012, the CDC issued an "Official Health Advisory Issuance of Guidance on Management of Asymptomatic Patients Who Received Epidural or Paraspinal Injections with Contaminated Steroid Products". The CDC recommended that health care providers monitor patients who received contaminated injections, but advised against prophylactic treatment with antifungal drugs for patients who did not show signs of infection. They indicated that the greatest risk of developing an infection was within the first six weeks after injection. People diagnosed with meningitis could expect to take antifungal drugs for a minimum of three months, and possibly as long as a year.

== Cases ==
Tennessee was the first state to have a reported case on September 21, 2012. The CDC reported that as of January 14, 2013, 678 people in 19 states had contracted a fungal disease, of whom 44 died. As of March 10, 2013, 48 people had died and 720 were being treated for persistent fungal infections. These cases were associated with three lots of methylprednisolone acetate, portions of which were shipped by NECC to 73 health care facilities in 23 states. The product was also sent to four states where no cases had been reported, and no complaints or cases were found in Massachusetts, the only state where NECC had a license. The final figures, which were disclosed in May 2015 when the litigation came to a close, were over 800 sickened with 64 deaths. A later report stated that 798 people had been affected and "over 100 people" had died.

== Prescribing of steroids for back and joint pain ==
The frequency of steroid injections to treat back pain in Medicare patients increased 121% from 1997 to 2006. Some doctors believe the efficacy of steroid injections for back and joint pain has not been demonstrated by scientific evidence, and challenge their use in these cases at all. According to The New England Journal of Medicine, "... it's important to note that many patients received these sterile injections for back and joint pain, a procedure that lacks high-quality evidence of efficacy. These problems cannot be laid entirely at the feet of compounders when clinicians persist in clinical practices despite weak evidence of efficacy." Doctors in professional societies are not in agreement about treatment guidelines. Although steroid injection for back pain clearly works in some cases, health researchers are "nearly unanimous" that it is "vastly overused".

A 2009 Cochrane review of injection therapy for subacute and chronic low back pain indicated no strong evidence exists for or against the use of any type of injection therapy. A four-year study released in 2013 suggested epidural steroid injections may actually lead to worse outcomes whether or not the patient later underwent surgery, and no evidence showed receiving steroid injections helped patients to avoid surgery. Also, in patients who had previously been treated with epidural steroids, evidence indicated surgery was more complicated than in patients who had not.

== Compounding pharmacies ==
The NECC was classified as a compounding pharmacy. Such pharmacies are authorized to combine, mix, or alter ingredients to create specific formulations of drugs to meet the specific needs of individual patients, and only in response to individual prescriptions. Since 1938, the FDA had sole authority to regulate drug manufacturing which is subject to strict FDA regulations, but in 1998 Congress exempted compounding pharmacies from FDA oversight despite strong objections of then-FDA Commissioner David A. Kessler, making oversight the shared responsibility of state and federal agencies. Compounding pharmacies must register with the FDA, but are not registered as drug manufacturers, and the agency does not approve their prescriptions before marketing, nor automatically receive adverse events reports. State law generally controls record keeping, certifications, and licensing for compounding pharmacies. In 2003, an official from the Food and Drug Administration told the Senate Health, Education, Labor and Pensions Committee that in 2001 the agency had done a "limited" survey of drugs from 12 compounding pharmacies, including hormones, antibiotics, steroids, and drugs to treat glaucoma, asthma, and erectile dysfunction, and 10 of the 29 drugs failed one or more quality tests. However, grassroots mobilization of compounding pharmacists and actions of congressional lobbyists prevented an attempt to establish an FDA oversight committee on pharmacy compounding.

Responding to the NECC meningitis outbreak, health officials and lawmakers said that compounding pharmacies can "fall into a regulatory black hole". Sen. Richard Blumenthal (D-CT), who was on the committee that oversees the FDA, said that compounding pharmacies have "relative immunity from standards of safety and effectiveness". The state, not the FDA, had oversight over NECC, though shipping out of state and manufacturing large batches of pharmaceuticals would have made them a manufacturer, and under FDA control. The compounding pharmacy industry had created safety standards, and in 2004, United States Pharmacopeia, an industry-backed nonprofit, established guidelines, but the industry was required to follow the guidelines in only 17 states. Few compounding pharmacies followed standards for manufacturers because of the cost. Legislation in 1997 would have given the FDA authority to regulate all compounding pharmacies, but that legislation was partially overturned by a 2002 Supreme Court decision.

An editorial in The New England Journal of Medicine suggested that while NECC appeared to be in clear violation of existing FDA policy the 2002 Supreme Court decision may have weakened federal-state cooperation. The NEJM noted:

- First, traditional compounding was limited to a pharmacist or a physician serving a specific patient. Section 503A also permitted compounding of drugs "in limited quantities before the receipt of a valid prescription order . . . based on a history of . . . receiving valid prescription orders." According to the preliminary report from the Commonwealth of Massachusetts, NECC far exceeded these limits in preparing and shipping vials of methylprednisolone acetate. Once disconnected from individual patients, compounding increasingly resembles drug manufacturing.
- Second, compounding is not needed if a drug is commercially available from an FDA-regulated facility. Section 503A prohibited compounding "regularly or in inordinate amounts" any drugs that were "essentially copies of a commercially available drug product". FDA-approved methylprednisolone acetate is sold by Pfizer and two generics companies, but since NECC's version did not contain preservatives, it could sidestep this regulatory process—with tragic results.
- Third, Congress recognized that states could effectively regulate traditional compounding pharmacies, but national-scale businesses required federal coordination. Section 503A provided a test for distinguishing between the two: it limited interstate shipments to no more than 5% of the compounder's business, unless the home state had entered into a "memorandum of understanding" with the FDA, bolstering state and federal cooperation. NECC shipped substantial quantities of drugs to many states. If Section 503A had not been struck down, both the FDA and Massachusetts would have been more directly involved in regulating NECC for more than a decade.

=== Problems at other compounding pharmacies ===
The FDA reported several previous incidents related to tainted drugs packaged at compounding pharmacies. Fungal contamination in relation to sterile drug recalls represents the second-most common form of microbiological contamination. In August 2011, the FDA reported that repackaged injections of Avastin (bevacizumab) caused serious eye infections in the Miami, Florida, area. A pharmacy had repackaged the Avastin from single-use vials into multiple single-use syringes, distributing them to multiple eye clinics, and infecting at least 12 patients. Some patients lost the remaining vision in the eye being treated.

From November 2011 to April 2012, 33 eye-surgery patients in seven states suffered a rare fungal eye infection tied to injectable drug products made by a compounding pharmacy in Ocala, Florida. Most of those patients suffered partial to severe vision loss.

In October 2012, Massachusetts shut down another compounding pharmacy over sterility concerns after they conducted a surprise inspection. Inspectors went to the Waltham, Massachusetts, location of the Rhode Island–based Infusion Resource company and found, "significant issues with the environment in which drugs were being mixed". The manager of the company was a former employee at Ameridose, which is owned by the same people who ran NECC.

On November 13, manufacturing problems were reported to be found at Ameridose, a Massachusetts company that makes injectable drugs. Ameridose and NECC were founded by brothers-in-law Barry Cadden and Greg Conigliaro. According to an FDA spokesperson, an inspection revealed the firm "fails to test finished product for potency, failed to investigate complaints for ineffective products, failed to investigate violations of their own environmental sampling plan and fails to adequately maintain equipment and facilities used to manufacture sterile drug products". The FDA report also revealed the company had received 33 complaints claiming "lack of effect" and "ineffectiveness" about its drugs. The same problem was found at the plant in 2008, and the FDA spokesperson said the FDA was checking to find what, if any, action was taken in 2008. According to the report, when doctors contacted the firm to say problems with its drugs had been found, the complaints were not classified as adverse events. That included "incidents when women given Ameridose's oxytocin, a drug used to bring on labor, reported fetal distress, severe post birth bleeding and shortness of breath. A blood thinner, heparin, had a complaint that the patient had a life-threatening adverse event [and when] the firm's pain medication fentanyl, given to cancer patients and as an anesthetic, was used, two patients were reported to have gone into respiratory distress."

The New York Times interviewed eight former employees of NECC and Ameridose. Some defended the company, but six said the corporate culture encouraged shortcuts, even when it compromised safety. At Ameridose, a pharmacist complained to management that quality control workers, who were not trained pharmacists, did work they should not have done. She said "near misses" of wrong doses were caught before they were shipped. A quality control technician tried to stop an assembly line and was eventually fired. An industry newsletter said Ameridose was shipping drugs without waiting the 14 days it took for the sterility test results to come back. Compounding pharmacies are only allowed to ship drugs for specific patients; a former NECC salesman said that NECC sold large quantities without the patients' names, and would put the names in the file as the drug was used, a practice that was accepted by some hospitals, but not others.

On December 7, 2012, Massachusetts regulators had taken action against three more compounding pharmacies following unannounced inspections. The Whittier Pharmacist, in Haverhill, was ordered to cease sterile compounding after unspecified violations were found, and OncoMed Pharmaceutical Services was ordered to close its Waltham facility after problems with the storage of chemotherapy drugs were found. Pallimed Solutions, based in Woburn, was told to halt production of sildenafil citrate, which is sold as Viagra, after inspectors found it had been prepared with improper components.

Two compounding pharmacies issued drug recalls in March 2013. Med Prep Consulting Inc and Clinical Specialties Compounding Pharmacy both issued recalls after Med Prep found particles floating in five doses of a compounded solution, and Clinical Specialties heard about five eye infections in patients who had received compounded eye injections.

== Investigation ==
In October 2012, an investigation of the NECC revealed the company had been in violation of its state license because it had been functioning as a drug manufacturer, producing drugs for broad use, rather than filling individual prescriptions as prescribed by individual doctors within the state. Some doctors and clinics may have turned away from major drug manufacturers and turned to compounding pharmacies as manufacturers because they often charge much lower prices than the major manufacturers. Reuters news service reviewed over a dozen emails to the NECC and found they solicited bulk orders from physicians and failed to require proof of individual patient prescriptions as required under state regulations. In October, Massachusetts officials launched a criminal investigation of the NECC and the Massachusetts Board of Registration in Pharmacy voted to permanently revoke their license to operate in Massachusetts, as well as the licenses of the company's three principal pharmacists to fill prescriptions in Massachusetts.

The preliminary investigation found unsanitary conditions, including fungus in steroid solutions. Massachusetts officials said that the NECC had shipped orders of the contaminated drug without waiting for final results of sterility testing. Records suggested NECC had failed to sterilize products for "even the minimum amount of time necessary to ensure sterility". Mats used to trap dust and dirt outside the rooms were dirty, sterile hoods were not properly cleaned, and a boiler was leaking next to a clean room, according to officials. Investigations also found that medical staff were using fake names such as "Harry Potter," "Baby Jesus," and "Chester Cheeto" to create fraudulent prescriptions for drugs. An email from Cadden read, "All names must resemble 'real' names... no obviously false names!"

U.S. and Massachusetts state health regulators were aware in 2002 that steroid treatments from NECC could cause adverse patient reactions. NECC had started to receive complaints in 1999, less than a year after it had been established. Many violations involved filling bulk medication orders without individual prescriptions. In 2004, state health officials charged the pharmacy with failure to comply with accepted standards when mixing methylprednisolone acetate, the same steroid that was the source of the 2012 meningitis outbreak. In 2006, the pharmacy agreed to inspections and improvement measures and an outside investigator was brought in to ensure compliance.

=== House Energy and Commerce Committee hearings ===
On November 12, the Oversight and Investigations Subcommittee of the House Energy and Commerce Committee released a detailed report of NECC's regulatory history. The congressional report shows that in 2003, the FDA considered the company a pharmacy, significant because following the meningitis outbreak, public health officials have charged that NECC was operating more as a manufacturer than a pharmacy. Manufacturers are regulated by the FDA and are subject to stricter quality standards than pharmacies. The report also shows that after investigations in 2003, the FDA officials asked that the compounding pharmacy be "prohibited from manufacturing" until it improved its operations, but Massachusetts regulators ultimately reached an agreement with the pharmacy to settle concerns about the quality of its prescription drugs.

According to documents summarized by the committee, within less than a year of the pharmacy's opening in 1998, they were cited by the state pharmacy board for providing doctors with blank prescription pads with NECC's information, which are illegal in Massachusetts—the pharmacy's owner and director, Barry Cadden, received an informal reprimand. Cadden continued to receive other complaints involving unprofessional conduct in coming years, and in several instances, Cadden refused to cooperate with investigators and challenged the agency's authority over his business. In 2002, the FDA investigated reports that five patients had become dizzy and short of breath after receiving a steroid used to treat joint pain and arthritis different from the one linked to the current meningitis outbreak. Initially, Cadden cooperated with the investigation, but during a second day of inspections, Cadden told officials that he was no longer willing to provide any additional records, and the FDA did not pursue the investigation. Also in 2002, the FDA received reports that two patients at a Rochester, N.Y., hospital came down with symptoms of bacterial meningitis after receiving injections of methylprednisolone acetate, the same injectable linked to the current outbreak. When officials from the FDA and Massachusetts Board of Pharmacy questioned Cadden, he said vials of the steroid returned by the hospital had tested negative for bacterial contamination. When FDA scientists tested samples of the drug collected in New York, though, they found bacterial contamination in four of 14 vials sampled.

Speaking to the committee in a statement, the interim commissioner of the Massachusetts Department of Public Health said, "It is clear that NECC knowingly disregarded sterility tests, prepared medicine in unsanitary conditions, and violated their pharmacy license. Poor judgment, missed opportunities, and a lack of appropriate oversight allowed NECC to continue on this troubling path." He announced that "the board staff who are responsible" had been either fired or replaced.

On November 14, the committee questioned the FDA Commissioner Margaret Hamburg, asking her why regulators at the FDA and the Massachusetts Board of Pharmacy did not take action against the pharmacy years earlier. Hamburg replied that the agency was obligated to defer to Massachusetts authorities, who have more direct oversight over pharmacies and stated, "In light of growing evidence of threats to the public health, the administration urges Congress to strengthen standards for non-traditional compounding." Joyce Lovelace, the widow of 78-year-old Kentucky circuit court judge Eddie C. Lovelace, who was the first confirmed victim of the outbreak, also spoke at the hearing. Following Lovelace, the committee attempted to question Barry Cadden, the owner and director of the NECC, but Cadden refused to testify, invoking his Fifth Amendment right to not answer questions to avoid self-incrimination.

During the second day of hearings, senators said that regulators had not only failed to move aggressively against NECC, but also against a sister company, Ameridose LLC, a large-scale drug compounder that supplies drugs to thousands of hospitals nationwide, as well. Although the FDA had repeatedly found reports of adverse events, faulty products, and medication errors in the last decade, no warning letter had ever been issued. In 2002, five patients became ill and two more were hospitalized with meningitis-like symptoms after they were injected with the same steroid implicated in the current outbreak, and yet the state took no action until 2006. Although the FDA has limited authority over compounders such as NECC, Ameridose is licensed by the FDA as a manufacturer and is clearly subject to its regulatory powers.

== Litigation and prosecution ==
In October 2012, plaintiffs in federally filed fungal meningitis lawsuits petitioned the U.S. Judicial Panel on Multidistrict Litigation (JPML) for establishment of a consolidated litigation in Minnesota federal court. NECC requested that the litigation be transferred to federal court in Massachusetts. In December 2012, the company filed for bankruptcy and U.S. District Judge Dennis Saylor ruled that meningitis lawsuits pending in Massachusetts federal court would be consolidated and allowed to move forward. By mid-December, over 400 lawsuits had been filed against NECC.

In May 2015, federal bankruptcy judge Henry Boroff approved a $200 million settlement plan that would set aside funds for victims of the outbreak and their families. The settlement plan received prior approval from the official committee of unsecured creditors in the bankruptcy case. By 2019, settlement payments had been made to 1,963 people with additional claims pending payout.

On December 17, 2014, federal prosecutors in Boston unsealed a 131-count federal criminal indictment related to the outbreak. It charged 14 former NECC employees, including president Barry Cadden and pharmacist Glenn Chin, with a host of criminal offenses. It alleged that from 2006 to 2012, NECC knowingly sent out drugs that were mislabeled, unsanitary, or contaminated—forming the basis for a massive RICO indictment against six individuals, including Cadden and Chin. The RICO count alleged 68 overt acts—including 25 counts of second-degree murder in seven states against Cadden and Chin. If convicted, Cadden and Chin faced life in prison.

Cadden was ultimately convicted of racketeering charges but acquitted of second-degree murder charges in March 2017; he was sentenced to 9 years in prison. In October 2017, Chin was convicted of racketeering and mail fraud but acquitted of second-degree murder as well; he was sentenced to 8 years in prison. On December 20, 2016, director of sales, Robert A. Ronzio, pled guilty to unrelated conspiracy charges of defrauding the FDA, actions that were discovered during the compounding investigation. Carla Conigliaro, majority owner of NECC, and her husband, Douglas Conigliaro, pled guilty to withdrawing cash from their bank accounts in small amounts, after the investigation began, to avoid financial reporting requirements. Carla Conigliaro was sentenced to one year of probation and ordered to pay a fine of $4,500, and Douglas Conigliaro was sentenced to two years of probation and ordered to pay a fine of $55,000.

In May 2019, two pharmacists were sentenced in connection with the compounding center. Gene Svirskiy was sentenced to 30 months in prison and one year of supervised release; Christopher Leary was sentenced to two years of probation and 100 hours of community service. Michelle Caetano Thomas, an assistant pharmacy professor at the University of Rhode Island, and Kathy Chin were convicted on two felony counts for their role in the scheme for filling obviously phony prescriptions for patients such as Coco Puff, LL Bean, and Mary Lamb.

On July 7, 2021, Barry Cadden's original 9-year sentence was increased to 14.5 years. An appeals court court decision required the trial judge to consider patients, and not only hospitals, as victims of the crime.

In 2024 Cadden and Chin were sentenced to prison on Michigan state charges of manslaughter. Cadden got 10 to 15 years and Chin got 7 1/2 to 15 years. The sentences will run concurrently with their federal sentences.

== Legislation ==
In September 2013, Michigan U.S. Representative Fred Upton introduced the Drug Quality and Security Act (H.R. 3204; 113th Congress) in response to the meningitis outbreak. Rep. Upton's district had three deaths and 19 total deaths occurred in Michigan. The bill passed the United States House of Representatives on September 28, 2013, by a voice vote and in November the United States Senate began working on a bill that would modify the Federal Food, Drug, and Cosmetic Act to grant the FDA more authority to regulate and monitor the manufacturing of compounding drugs. The Drug Quality and Security Act (H.R. 3204) was passed by the Senate on November 18, 2013. It was signed into law by President Obama on November 27, 2013.

== Culture and society ==
- In 2019, Cadden and the NECC were criticized by John Oliver in a large segment of his satirical show Last Week Tonight.
- "Lethal medicine linked to meningitis outbreak" CBS 60 Minutes report (March 2013)
- 2020 expose' by American Greed (S13E10) "Painful Greed Turns Deadly"
- Episode 114 of True Crime Podcast "Swindled", released August 1, 2024
