= Diascopy =

Medical test of skin blanching

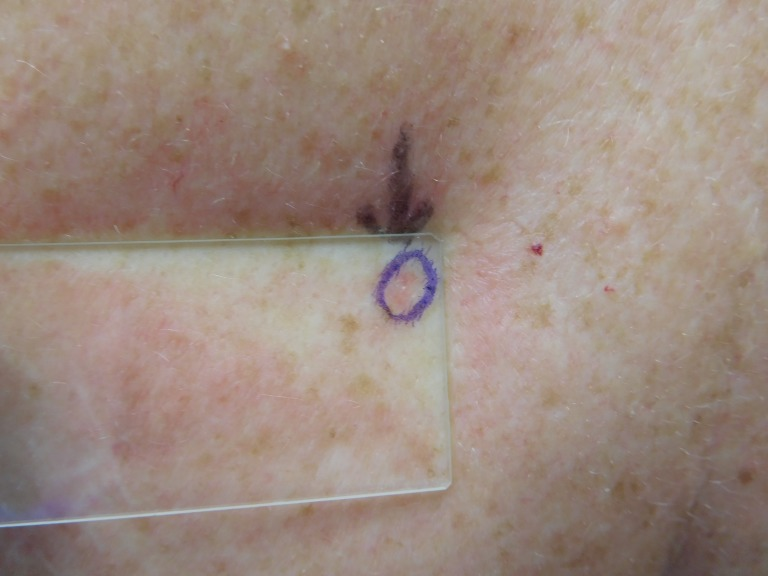
Diascopy of a red dot basal cell carcinoma on the left mid back of a 74-year-old female. The red dot basal cell carcinoma on the left mid back is circled; the tumor blanches when a glass microscope slide is pressed against it. From a case series by Philip R Cohen, 2017.

Diascopy is a test for blanchability performed by applying pressure with a finger or glass slide and observing color changes.

It is used to determine whether a lesion is vascular (inflammatory or congenital), nonvascular (nevus), or hemorrhagic (petechia or purpura). Hemorrhagic lesions and nonvascular lesions do not blanch ("negative diascopy"); inflammatory lesions do ("positive diascopy"). Diascopy is sometimes used to identify sarcoid skin lesions, which, when tested, turn an apple jelly color.

Diascopy with glassware is used as a method of diagnosing bacterial meningitis, as the rashes caused by the illness are non-blanching.
