= NBR =

NBR may refer to:

== Rail ==
- New Brunswick Railway, a former Canadian railway company absorbed by the Canadian Pacific Railway
- North Bay Railway, a light-railway system for tourists in Scarborough, North Yorkshire
- North British Railway (1844–1923), a former Scottish railway company absorbed by London and North Eastern Railway

== Media ==
- National Board of Review, an American film review organization
- National Business Review, a weekly New Zealand newspaper aimed at the business sector
- Nightly Business Report, an American business and economic television news program

== Other uses ==
- Nabors Industries (NYSE symbol), an oil, natural gas and geothermal drilling contractor
- National Bison Range, a National Wildlife Refuge, Montana, United States
- National Buildings Record (1940–1963), an archive of historic building information in England
- National Board of Revenue, former Bangladeshi central authority for tax administration
- National Bureau of Asian Research, an American research institution for Asia-Pacific policy
- Nitrile butadiene rubber, an oil-resistant synthetic rubber copolymer
- Non-blanching rash, a type of skin rash
- Norma Brasileira, Brazilian National Standard by the Brazilian National Standards Organization
