= Professional Compounding Centers of America =

In 1981, the Professional Compounding Centers of America (PCCA) was incorporated to provide compounded medications to patients, when the medicine became unavailable commercially.

PCCA services pharmacies who provide these compounded medications, giving them training, recipes, and materials. However, according to Science-Based Medicine, " the enthusiasm can outpace the evidence, and there may be a lack of evidence that compounded products really are safe and effective."

The organization supported pharmacies in 2011 who were helping provide alternatives to hydroxyprogesterone in an attempt to prevent early labor. In 2014 the company acquired two manufacturers and distributors of materials and compounded medications. They were sued in 2019 for providing the formulation of an injection that caused 68 people to go blind.
