= Chronic meningitis =

Inflammation of membranes around the brain

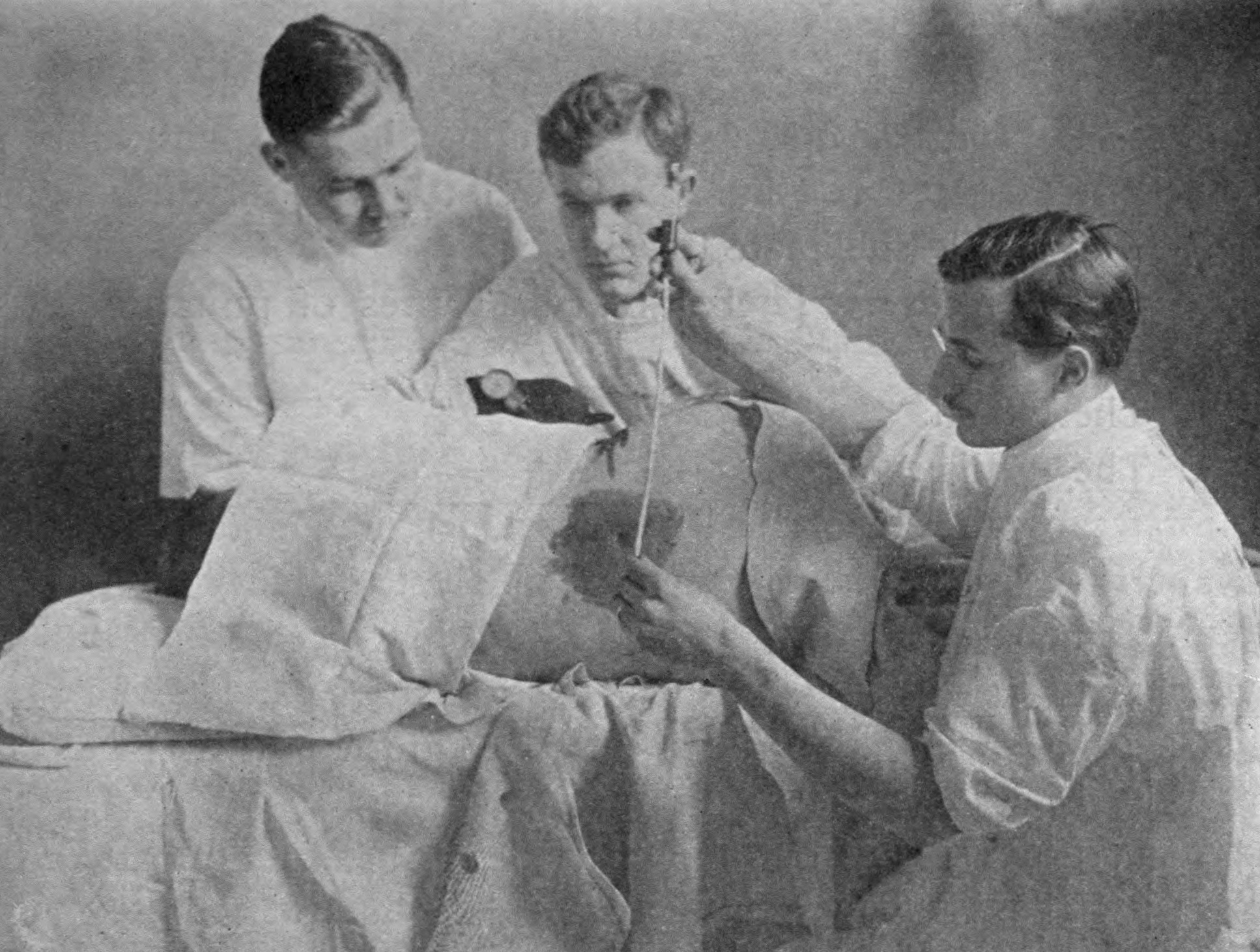
- Healthcare workers performing a lumbar puncture, obtaining a sample of the cerebrospinal fluid aids in the diagnosis of chronic meningitis
- Specialty: Infectious disease, Microbiology, Neurology, Neurosurgery
- Symptoms: Headache, lethargy, confusion, fever, nausea, vomiting, visual impairment
- Complications: Cranial nerve palsies, ophthalmoplegia, seizures, ataxia, psychiatric disorders, hemiparesis, deafness, blindness, intellectual disability
- Duration: Chronic, by definition lasting longer than 4 weeks. With some infections lasting many months
- Causes: Microorganisms (bacteria and fungi), viruses, and non-infectious causes including cancer, medications, autoimmune disease or inflammatory conditions
- Risk factors: HIV infection, diabetes, immunosuppression
- Diagnostic method: Culture of microorganism from the cerebrospinal fluid (CSF), biopsy of tissue or CSF sample with staining of organism, molecular methods such as immunoassay (antigen or antibody assays), nucleic acid amplification, magnetic resonance imaging (MRI) of the brain
- Prevention: Vaccination, BCG vaccine in tuberculosis meningitis
- Medication: Antibiotics, antifungals, antivirals in infectious causes
- Prognosis: Poor

Chronic meningitis is a long-lasting inflammation of the membranes lining the brain and spinal cord (known as the meninges). By definition, the duration of signs, symptoms and inflammation in chronic meningitis last longer than 4 weeks. Infectious causes (due to bacteria, fungi and viruses) are a leading cause and the infectious organisms responsible for chronic meningitis are different than the organisms that cause acute infectious meningitis. Tuberculosis and the fungi cryptococcus are leading causes worldwide. Chronic meningitis due to infectious causes are more common in those who are immunosuppressed, including those with HIV infection or in children who are malnourished. Chronic meningitis sometimes has a more insidious course than acute meningitis. Also, some of the infectious agents that cause chronic infectious meningitis such as mycobacterium tuberculosis, many fungal species and viruses are difficult to isolate from the cerebrospinal fluid (the fluid surrounding the brain and spinal cord) making diagnosis challenging. No cause is identified during initial evaluation in one third of cases. Magnetic resonance imaging (MRI) of the brain is more sensitive than computed tomography (CT scan) and may show radiological signs that suggest chronic meningitis, however no radiological signs are considered pathognomonic or characteristic. MRI is also normal in many cases further limiting its diagnostic utility.

Worldwide, tuberculosis meningitis is a leading cause of disability and death, with central nervous system tuberculosis (with tuberculosis meningitis being the most common type) occurring in 5-10% of all cases of extrapulmonary tuberculosis and 1% of all cases of tuberculosis overall. Cryptococcal meningitis is also a major cause of death and disability worldwide, especially in areas where HIV and AIDS are more common, accounting for more than 100,000 yearly deaths in Sub-Saharan Africa. Cryptococcal meningitis accounts for about 68% of meningitis cases in those with HIV and has a mortality rate of 10-25%, with delays in diagnosis and treatment being especially common and associated with a poor prognosis. The treatment for chronic infectious meningitis is directed at the underlying infectious agent.

== Signs and symptoms ==
Some of the possible symptoms of chronic meningitis (due to any cause) include headache, nausea and vomiting, fever, and visual impairment. Nuchal rigidity (or neck stiffness with discomfort in trying to move the neck), a classic symptom in acute meningitis, was seen in only 45% of cases of chronic meningitis with the sign being even more rare in non-infectious causes. Other signs associated with chronic meningitis include altered mental status or confusion, and papillary edema (swelling of the optic disc).

The headache in chronic meningitis is commonly described as diffuse, poorly localized, and constant. Lethargy is a common symptom, with 40% of those having mental status changes. The inflammation can affect the cranial nerves as they course through the subarachnoid space leading to cranial nerve palsies. Nerve roots may also be affected in chronic meningitis leading to radiculopathy.

== Cause ==
The causes of chronic infectious meningitis are different than those of acute infectious meningitis. Worldwide, the fungi cryptococcus and tuberculosis are leading infectious causes. Immunosuppression (due to a variety of causes) is a major risk factor for the development of chronic infectious meningitis, with Cryptococcus meningitis (which is transmitted by inhalation of fungal spores) being the most common cause of chronic meningitis in those who are immunosuppressed. Worldwide, HIV and AIDS (which are characterized by immunosuppression) are major risk factors for the development of chronic infectious meningitis. Diabetes, recent ear surgery or neurosurgery, and the presence of a ventriculoperitoneal shunt are other risk factors for the development of chronic infectious meningitis. Other fungi that are ubiquitously found in the environment (either in certain regions of the world or globally) are also known causes. These fungi include coccidioidomycosis, histoplasmosis, blastomycosis, aspergillus and cryptococcus gattii (which may also cause chronic meningitis in those with normal immune function).

In 2012-2013, an outbreak of fungal meningitis in the United States linked to contaminated steroids designated for epidural spinal injections led to the development of meningitis in about 800 people and more than 100 deaths.

The most common bacterial causes of chronic meningitis include tuberculosis and treponema pallidum (neurosyphillis). Other bacterial causes include leptospirosis and brucellosis. HIV is a potential viral cause. HIV leads to immunosuppression and subsequent chronic infectious meningitis by a variety of potential opportunistic organisms, however the HIV itself may also cause infectious meningitis, usually during the initial phase of HIV infection. Herpes simplex virus, lymphocytic choriomeningitis virus are other viruses that may cause chronic meningitis.

Non-infectious causes of chronic meningitis include potential etiologies that cause meningeal irritation, such as medications, inflammatory diseases, auto-immune diseases and cancer. Chemical inflammation of the meninges may be due to Non-steroidal anti-inflammatory (NSAID) drugs (most commonly with ibuprofen), immunoglobulin therapy, anti-microbials (such as trimethoprim/sulfamethoxazole), immunosuppressants, chemotherapy and anticonvulsants (most commonly lamotrigine and carbamazepine). Auto-immune diseases such as lupus, rheumatoid arthritis or Sjogren syndrome may cause inflammation of the meningitis. Various inflammatory conditions such as neurosarcoidosis, IgG4 related pachymeningitis or leptomeningitis are also known causes of chronic meningitis. Carcinomatous meningitis involves meningeal inflammation due to cancer spread to the meninges. The types of cancers that are most commonly associated with meningeal spread include breast and lung cancer, melanoma skin cancer, lymphomas, and leukemia. Dermoid cysts near the brain or spinal cord, a type of cyst containing developmentally mature tissue, may leak their contents into the subarachnoid space thus leading to meningeal inflammation.

== Pathophysiology ==
The pathogenesis of tuberculosis meningitis involves mycobacterium tuberculosis being shed into the environment via respiratory droplets from an infected person. These droplets are then inhaled to the lungs where the mycobacterium tuberculosis is phagocytosed by macrophages as part of the Th1-helper T cell response and a granuloma forms. Either via disseminated tuberculosis or by other means, some tubercula gain access to the meninges. Small foci of tuberculous bacilli, known as Rich foci, deposit in the brain, meninges, and spinal cord. The tuberculosis bacilli then gain access to the subarachnoid space via the Rich foci and begin the process of meningeal inflammation characteristic of tuberculosis meningitis.

Cryptococcus species (cryptococcus gatti and neoformans) have a polysaccharide capsule surrounding the yeasts to shield the yeast from immune system killing. Cryptococcus also has a cell wall laccase, a copper-containing cell wall enzyme that increases the release of dopamine and prostaglandin E2 inflammatory markers in humans to increase inflammation.

== Diagnosis ==
Chronic meningitis is defined by signs and symptoms being present longer than four weeks and includes pleocytosis, or the presence of inflammatory cells in the cerebrospinal fluid. The initial test is usually a lumbar puncture to collect cerebrospinal fluid for analysis. The lumbar puncture in chronic meningitis usually shows a lymphocytic predominant inflammatory pattern, however, some infectious agents such as early tuberculosis meningitis, nocardia or brucella may have an neutrophilic predominant inflammation. A eosinophilic predominant inflammation may be seen with some parasites that cause chronic infectious meningitis. The content of protein and glucose in the cerebrospinal fluid also varies depending on the etiology. Many of the organisms responsible for chronic infectious meningitis (especially mycobacterium tuberculosis and most types of fungi) are difficult to grow on culture making diagnosis especially difficult. Large volume lumbar punctures (obtaining more than 10 mL of cerebrospinal fluid) or multiple lumbar punctures may increase diagnostic yield. Serologic testing of the cerebrospinal fluid or blood (testing for specific antibodies or antigens related to an infectious organism) may aid in the diagnosis and is available for infectious causes such as HIV, syphilis, and Lyme disease. Nucleic acid amplification or PCR of the cerebrospinal fluid may also assist in identifying a causative organism. PCR specific to bacterial RNA (16S ribosomal RNA) or fungal RNA (18S ribosomal RNA) further aids in identifying the causative organism. Metagenomic sequencing has been used to detect a wide variety of genetic material in a sample (rather than testing for specific predetermined organisms with PCR) of the cerebrospinal fluid and aids in the identification of infectious causes of chronic meningitis that are difficult to isolate by conventional methods. The clinical relevance of detected genetic material in the pathology of chronic infectious meningitis can be further confirmed by comparing the metagenomic genetic material to controls from healthy individuals.

MRI of the brain with contrast may show enhancement of the meninges and the subarachnoid space however MRI may also be normal. MRI is the preferred neuroimaging test to diagnose chronic meningitis, being more sensitive than CT of the brain, however, MRI scanners are not available in many resource-limited settings where chronic infectious meningitis is prevalent.

Brain biopsy is considered a second-line test, that is usually utilized when first-line testing fails to identify a cause. Brain biopsy has increased diagnostic yield when highly enhancing brain or meningeal areas on MRI are biopsied.

== Treatment ==
Initial diagnostic evaluation often fails to identify a causative organism in chronic infectious meningitis and empirical therapy may be initiated to prevent significant disability or death. Empiric therapy is indicated in those who are immunocompromised or who are neutropenic. In those who are immune-competent, empiric therapy is less well-established and is usually initiated on a case-by-case basis. In those who undergo empirical therapy, treatment involves anti-tuberculosis therapy combined with steroids in areas where tuberculosis is endemic. Anti-fungal empirical therapy is also commonly employed due to fungi's ubiquitous presence and ability to cause opportunistic infections in those who are immunosuppressed. When a causative organism is identified then anti-microbial therapy is targeted specifically to that organism.

Treatment of tuberculosis meningitis consists of a 2-month induction regiment with isoniazid, rifampin, pyrazinamide, and ethambutol followed by an extended course (often 7-10 months) of isoniazid and rifampin as maintenance therapy. Isoniazid and pyrazinamide can cross the blood-brain barrier. However the duration of maintenance treatment is assumed based on experience with pulmonary tuberculosis, and the optimal duration of therapy in tuberculosis meningitis is not well established. Steroid co-administration is thought to improve outcomes. There is a paucity of information regarding the optimal treatment regiment for multi-drug resistant tuberculosis meningitis (which is by definition resistant to isoniazid and rifampin), but fluoroquinolones and aminoglycosides can achieve adequate brain and spinal cord penetration and are often used.

The World Health Organization recommends a screen and treat approach to diagnose cryptococcal meningitis in those with HIV. All HIV-positive people with low CD4+ T cells should undergo cryptococcal serum antigen testing. Those who screen positive for serum cryptococcal antigen should undergo a lumbar puncture followed by treatment if the cerebrospinal fluid contains cryptococcus. Those who cannot undergo a lumbar puncture but screen positive for cryptococcal antigen in the serum should be presumptively treated. Cryptococcal meningitis is treated with 2 weeks of induction therapy using the antifungals amphotericin B and flucytosine followed by 8 weeks of induction therapy with fluconazole and then a prolonged duration (at least one year) of lower dose maintenance fluconazole therapy. Lifelong treatment is required in those with AIDS, however, in those who begin anti-retroviral therapy and have CD4 T-cells above 200, therapy can be stopped. Steroid co-therapy is not indicated in cryptococcal meningitis and may worsen outcomes and delay recovery.

Hydrocephalus is a common complication in chronic infectious meningitis, including tuberculosis and cryptococcal meningitis. In cases of hydrocephalus, intracranial pressure is controlled by serial therapeutic lumbar punctures (often done daily) until opening pressure normalizes. Diuretics such as furosemide or acetazolamide, osmotic agents such as mannitol, external ventricular drainage, or ventriculoperitoneal shunts may also be used in tuberculosis meningitis to control intracranial pressure.

== Prevention ==
The BCG vaccine has been shown to lower the risk of developing tuberculosis meningitis in those who become infected with tuberculosis. In children who developed tuberculosis meningitis, those who had the BCG vaccine had milder symptoms and were less likely to die from the disease.

== Prognosis ==
The mortality of tuberculosis meningitis is 20-50% even with treatment. A longer duration of presenting symptoms was associated with a higher mortality in tuberculosis meningitis. HIV co-infection, multidrug resistant tuberculosis, or the development of hydrocephalus or focal weakness in tuberculosis meningitis are also associated with a poor prognosis. In those who survive tuberculosis meningitis, 30% have longstanding neurological impairments including seizures, weakness, deafness, blindness, intellectual disability.

The mortality rate in cryptococcal meningitis is 25%. Increased intracranial pressure, co-infection with tuberculosis or cytomegalovirus, elevated neutrophil counts, high fungal burden and hyponatremia is associated with a poor prognosis and increased risk of death in those with cryptococcal meningitis. Increased intracranial pressure is seen in about 50% of those with HIV-associated cryptococcal meningitis.

== Epidemiology ==
Tuberculosis meningitis is more common in children and people who are HIV positive. Cryptococcal meningitis is also more common in those who are HIV positive; with HIV co-infection being present in 95% of cases in low and middle-income countries and 80% of cases in high-income countries. Those who are immunosuppressed due to organ transplantation also have a higher incidence of cryptococcal meningitis.
