= New England Compounding Center =

Former compounding pharmacy in Framingham, Massachusetts, US

Coordinates: 42.27320°N 71.42708°W

- Industry: Pharmaceutical
- Founded: 1998
- Headquarters: Framingham, Massachusetts U.S.
- Key people: Gregory Conigliaro, owner and director Barry Cadden, owner, president and head pharmacist Lisa Conigliaro Cadden, pharmacist and owner Douglas Conigliaro, anesthesiologist and president of Medical Sales Management; Carla Conigliaro, shareholder and director; wife of Douglas Conigliaro; Glenn Adam Chin, supervisory pharmacist
- Products: Pharmaceuticals
- Revenue: $100 Million
- Number of employees: 100
- Website: http://neccrx.com [Archive]

New England Compounding Center (NECC) was a compounding pharmacy founded in 1998, along with its sister companies Ameridose, Medical Sales Management Inc, and Alaunus Pharmaceutical LLC. Based in Framingham, Massachusetts, the New England Compounding Center was founded by brothers-in-law Greg Conigliaro and Barry Cadden. The owners were Carla R. Conigliaro, Barry J. Cadden, Lisa M. Conigliaro and Gregory A. Conigliaro.

== Ameridose ==
Ameridose was established to be a large manufacturer of prescription medications for use in hospitals. The original location of the company's plant was in Framingham, Massachusetts next to its sister-companies New England Compounding Center and Medical Sales Management. In 2009, they purchased and started operations at two new locations, 205 and 203 Flanders Road in nearby Westborough, Massachusetts, to accommodate the steady growth of the company. Ameridose would eventually employ over 1,000 people and report annual revenues of $400 million.

== NECC 2012 outbreak ==
The company became the center of national headlines resulting from a meningitis outbreak that started in September, 2012. NECC recalled more than 2,000 products after distributing 17,000 vials of methylprednisolone for injection contaminated with fungi to 23 states.

Food and Drug Administration (FDA) regulations dictate that compounding pharmacies like NECC combine, mix, or alter ingredients only to create specific drugs for individual patients. Massachusetts state regulators reported NECC was licensed only to prepare individual patient prescriptions. Doctors, hospitals, and clinics had turned to compounding pharmacies like NECC because they often charge much lower prices than the major manufacturers.

On December 21, 2012, the company filed for Chapter 11 bankruptcy protection, listing less than $2.34 million in debts. Following the bankruptcy, a Reuters investigation into financial filings revealed company payments exceeding $33 million to the top executives and private equity investors in 2012. The Tennessean reported that between 2008 and 2013, shareholders received a total of $300 million from NECC and its sister company, Ameridose.

In 2018, Glenn Chin, the surpervisory pharmacist, was sentenced to 15 years in federal prison. In 2021, Barry Cadden, the owner of the company, was sentenced to 14 years in federal prison.
