= Non-blanching rash =

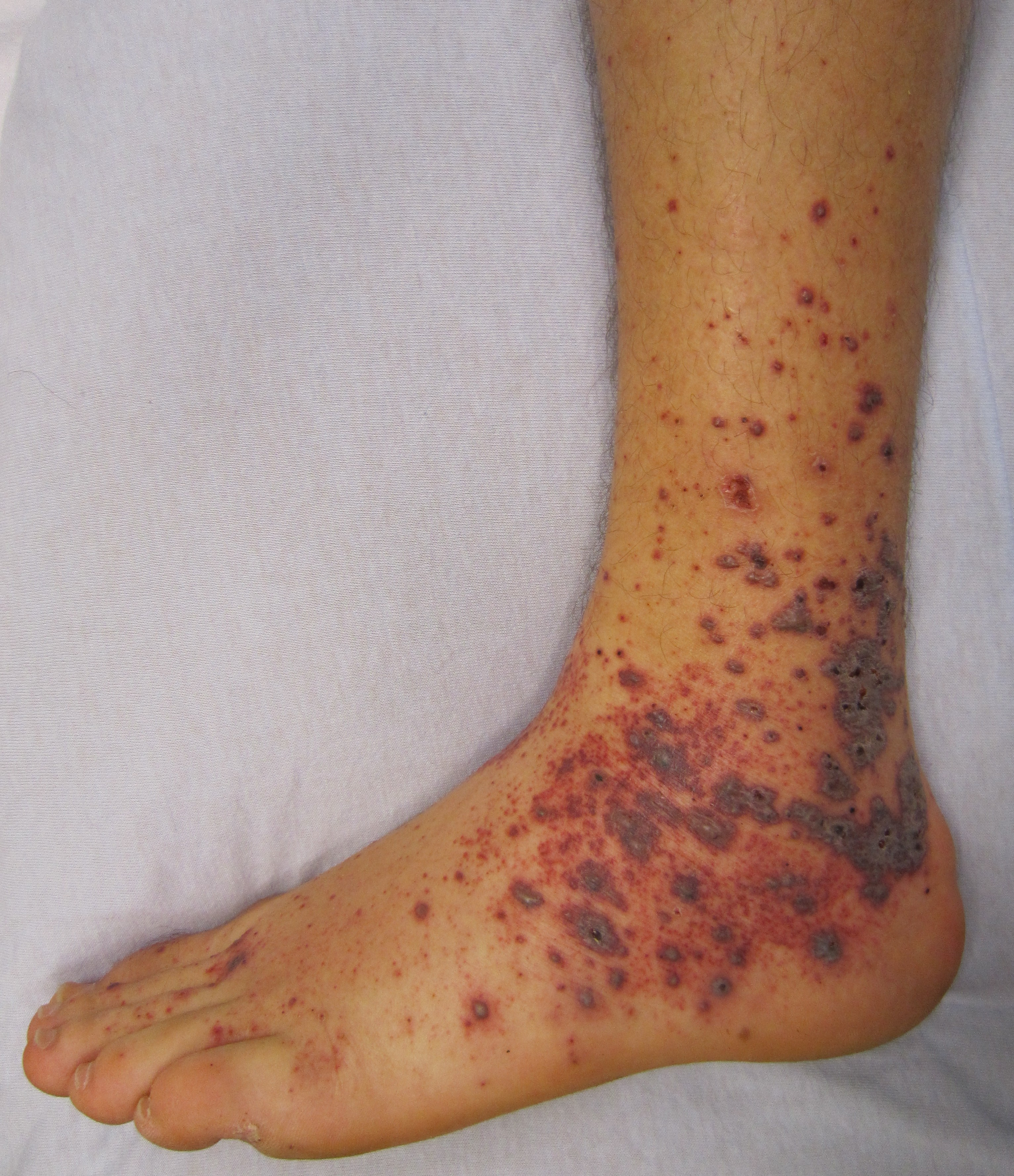
- Both petechiae and purpura on the lower limb due to medication induced vasculitis
- Specialty: Dermatology, hematology

A non-blanching rash (NBR) is a skin rash that does not fade when pressed with, and viewed through, a glass.

It is a characteristic of both purpuric and petechial rashes. Individual purpura measure 3–10 mm (0.3–1 cm, 3/32–3/8 in), whereas petechiae measure less than 3 mm.

A non-blanching rash can be a symptom of bacterial meningitis, but this is not the exclusive cause.
