= Ameridose =

Former compounding pharmacy in Framingham, Massachusetts, US

- Industry: Pharmaceutical
- Founded: 1998
- Headquarters: Westborough, Massachusetts U.S.
- Key people: Gregory Conigliaro, owner and director Barry Cadden, owner, Douglas Conigliaro, anesthesiologist and president of Medical Sales Management; Carla Conigliaro, shareholder and director; wife of Douglas Conigliaro; Glenn Adam Chin, supervisory pharmacist
- Products: pharmaceuticals
- Revenue: $400 million
- Number of employees: 1,000
- Website: ameridose.com

Ameridose, LLC. is a medical manufacturer based in Westborough, Massachusetts. The company was founded, along with its sister company New England Compounding Center, by brothers-in-law Greg Conigliaro and Barry Cadden. The owners of Ameridose are Carla R. Conigliaro, Barry J. Cadden, Lisa M. Conigliaro and Gregory A. Conigliaro.

== History ==
Brothers-in-law Greg Conigliaro and Barry Cadden established Ameridose to be a large manufacturer of prescription medications for use in hospitals. The original location of the company's plant was in Framingham, Massachusetts next to its sister-companies New England Compounding Center and Medical Sales Management. In 2009, they purchased and started operations at two new locations, 205 and 203 Flanders Road in nearby Westborough, to accommodate the steady growth of the company. Ameridose would eventually employ over 1,000 people and report annual revenues of $400 million.

=== NECC Affiliation ===
Ameridose's sister-company, New England Compounding Center (NECC), was implicated as the source of a nationwide fungal meningitis outbreak of 2012. It was found that tainted batches of the steroid methylprednisolone acetate caused hundreds of cases of fungal meningitis.

Although Ameridose was not the source of the outbreak, the company was largely impacted by its affiliation with NECC. Due to pressure from the state and the U.S. Food and Drug Administration (FDA) because of growing concern of their association with NECC, the company recalled all of its products and shut down operations in November 2012. In early 2013, Ameridose laid off 850 employees working in its Westborough facilities.

The FDA began investigating Ameridose's facilities in October 2012. There were fifteen concerning observations that they made during the investigations. These include the following:

- A bird was observed flying around inside the building in an area where finished drugs are stored
- Insects were found in an area where finished drugs are stored
- Gaps were observed underneath doors and "pass-through boxes"
- Thick residues of orange, brown, and green were observed in several hoods where drugs are made
- Drugs were shipped out before sterility tests were complete
- Ameridose failed to investigate complaints made by customers about its products

On October 12, 2012, The New York Times published an article in which they interviewed employees from both NECC and Ameridose. Some stated that the company was run well and seemed safe. Several others voiced their concerns with the companies. Many employees interviewed believed that Ameridose emphasized quantity and speed instead of quality and safety. The article also stated that in 2008 an inspector from the FDA found that the firm did not use adequate potency testing on their products.

In December 2012, WFXT reporter Mike Beaudet interviewed a former Ameridose employee. She said employees would often see bugs and birds inside the company's buildings. She also claimed that she witnessed company supervisors attempting to cover up their tracks for taking shortcuts when they learned that the FDA was going to inspect their facilities.

On December 21, 2012, NECC filed for Chapter 11 bankruptcy protection, listing less than $2.34 million in debts Following the bankruptcy, a Reuters investigation into financial filings revealed company payments exceeding $33 million to the top executives and private equity investors in 2012. The Tennessean reported that between 2008 and 2013, shareholders received a total of $300 million from New England Compounding Center and Ameridose.
