= Blanch (medical) =

Whitish appearance of the skin

When skin is blanched, it takes on a whitish appearance as blood flow to the region is prevented. This occurs during and is the basis of the physiologic test known as diascopy.

Blanching of the fingers is also one of the most clinically evident signs of Raynaud's phenomenon.

Blanching is prevented in gangrene as the red blood corpuscles are extravasated and impart red color to the gangrenous part.

== See also ==
- Diascopy
- Pallor
