= Compounding =

Preparation of a custom medication

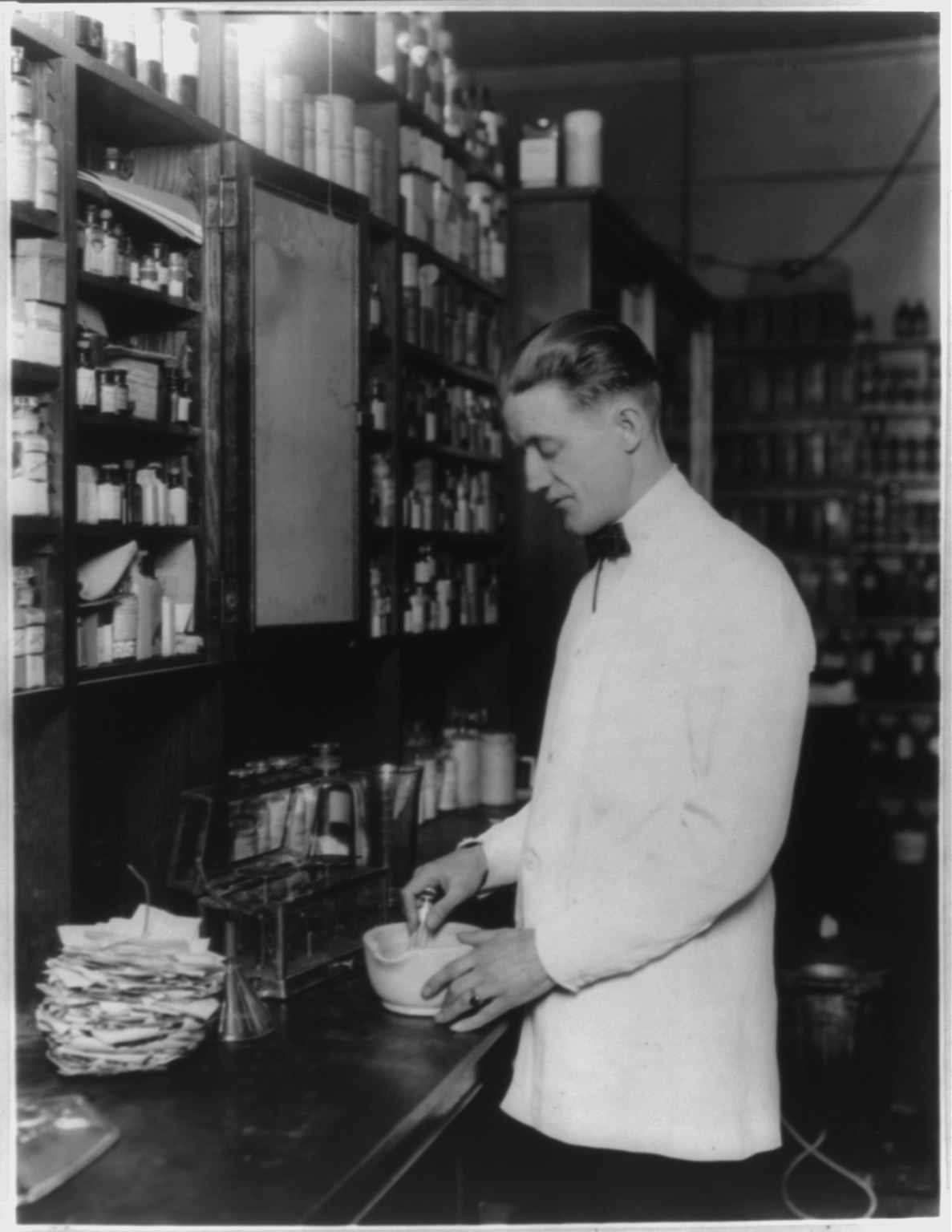
Pharmacist compounding a medication using a mortar and pestle (c. 1923)

In the field of pharmacy, compounding (performed in a compounding pharmacy) is preparation of custom medications to fit unique prescriptions that cannot be met with mass-produced formulations. This may be done, for example, to provide medication in a form easier for a given person to ingest (e.g., liquid vs. tablet), to avoid a non-active ingredient, or to provide a particular dose tailored to a given person, referred to as "traditional" compounding.

Compounding preparations of a given formulation in advance batches, as opposed to preparation for a specific person on demand, is known as "non-traditional" or "officinal" compounding, and is akin to small-scale manufacturing. Jurisdictions have varying regulations that apply to both traditional and non-traditional compounding, as well as mass-producing drug manufacturers.

Hospital pharmacies typically engage in compounding medications for intravenous administration, whereas outpatient or community pharmacies typically engage in compounding medications for oral or topical administration. Because of the rising cost of compounding and drug shortages, some hospitals outsource their compounding needs, particularly of sterile-injectable medications, to large-scale compounding pharmacies.

== History ==
The earliest chemists were familiar with various natural substances and their uses. They compounded a variety of preparations such as medications, dyes, incense, perfumes, ceremonial compounds, preservatives and cosmetics. In the medieval Islamic world in particular, Muslim pharmacists and chemists developed advanced methods of compounding drugs. The first drugstores were opened by Muslim pharmacists in Baghdad in 754. The modern age of pharmacy compounding began in the 19th century with the isolation of various compounds from coal tar for the purpose of producing synthetic dyes. From this came the earliest antibacterial sulfa drugs, phenolic compounds made famous by Joseph Lister, and plastics.

During the 1800s, pharmacists specialized in the raising, preparation and compounding of crude drugs. Crude drugs, like opium, are from natural sources and usually contain several chemical compounds. The pharmacist extracted these drugs using solvents such as water or alcohol to form extracts, concoctions and decoctions. They eventually began isolating and identifying the active ingredients in these drug concoctions. Using fractionation or recrystallization, they separated an active ingredient from the crude preparation, and compounded a medication using this active ingredient.

With the isolation of medications from the raw materials or crude drugs came the birth of the modern pharmaceutical company. Pharmacists were trained to compound the preparations made by the drug companies, but they could not do it efficiently on a small scale. So economies of scale, not lack of skill or knowledge, produced the modern pharmaceutical industry. With the turn of the 20th century came greater government regulation of the practice of medicine. These new regulations forced the drug companies to prove that any new medication they brought to market was safe. With the discovery of penicillin, modern marketing techniques and brand promotion, the drug manufacturing industry came of age. Pharmacists continued to compound most prescriptions until the early 1950s when the majority of dispensed drugs came directly from the large pharmaceutical companies.

== Roles ==
A physician may choose to prescribe a compounded medication for a person with an unusual health need and/or one that cannot be met with mass-produced drug products. A physician may choose to prescribe a compounded medication for reasons such as:

- people who cannot consume the mass-produced version of a given drug (e.g., allergy or sensitivity to an inactive ingredient)
- people requiring a dose of a given drug that is not available in mass-produced versions (e.g., a very small dose for infants)
- people requiring a different formulation, such as converting a pill into a drinkable liquid or a transdermal gel (for people who cannot swallow pills)
- people who may benefit from a different concentration of a given drug (e.g. if they absorb or excrete medications abnormally)
- people who need drugs that have been discontinued by pharmaceutical manufacturers because of low profitability
- people facing a supply shortage of their drug
- children whose compliance is enhanced by flavored additives in liquid medication, to alleviate unpleasant taste
- in veterinary medicine, often for similar reasons as with humans. In the United States, compounded veterinary medicine must meet the standards set forth in the Animal Medicinal Drug Use Clarification Act
- various types of bioidentical hormone replacement therapy
- people whose intolerance to a medication is significantly alleviated by combining multiple medications in a single drug product

== In hospitals ==
In hospitals, pharmacists and pharmacy technicians often make compounded sterile preparations (CSPs) using manual methods. The error rate for manually compounded sterile IV products is high. The Institute for Safe Medication Practices has expressed concern with manual methods, particularly the error-prone nature of the syringe pull-back method of verifying sterile preparations. To increase accuracy, some U.S. hospitals have adopted IV workflow management systems and robotic compounding systems. These technologies use barcode scanning to identify each ingredient and gravimetric weight measurement to confirm the proper dose amount. The workflow management systems incorporate software to guide pharmacy technicians through the process of preparing IV medications. The robotic systems prepare IV syringes and bags in an ISO Class 5 environment, and support sterility and dose accuracy by removing human error and contamination from the process.

== Regulation ==
=== Australia ===
In Australia the Pharmacy Board of Australia is responsible for registration of pharmacists and professional practice including compounding. Although almost all pharmacies are able to prepare at least simple compounded medicines, some pharmacy staff undertake further training and education to be able to prepare more complex products. Although pharmacists who have undertaken further training to do complex compounding are not yet easily identified, the Board has been working to put a credentialing system in place. In 2011 the Pharmacy Board convened a Compounding Working Party to advise on revised compounding standards. Draft compounding guidelines for comment were released in April 2014. Pharmacists must comply with current guidelines or may be sanctioned by the Board.

Both sterile and non-sterile compounding are legal provided the compounding is done for therapeutic use in a particular patient, and the compounded product is supplied on or from the compounding pharmacy. There are additional requirements for sterile compounding. Not only must a laminar flow cabinet [laminar flow hood] be used, but the environment in which the hood is located must be strictly controlled for microbial and particulate contamination and all procedures, equipment and personnel must be validated to ensure the safe preparation of sterile products. In non-sterile compounding, a powder containment hood is required when any hazardous material (e.g. hormones) are prepared or when there is a risk of cross-contamination of the compounded product. Pharmacists preparing compounded products must comply with these requirements and others published in the Australian Pharmaceutical Formulary & Handbook.

=== United States ===
In the United States, compounding pharmacies are licensed and regulated by states. National standards have been created by the Pharmacy Compounding Accreditation Board, although obtaining accreditation is not mandatory. The Food and Drug Administration (FDA) has authority to regulate "manufacturing" of pharmaceutical products—which applies when drug products are not made or modified as to be tailored in some way to the individual patient.

In the Drug Quality and Security Act (DQSA) of 2013 (H.R. 3204), Congress amended the Federal Food, Drug, and Cosmetic Act (FFDCA) to clarify limits of FDA jurisdiction over "traditional" or patient-specific compounding, and to provide an optional pathway for "non-traditional" or bulk compounders to operate. The law established that pharmacies compounding only patient-specific preparations made in response to a prescription ("503A" pharmacies) cannot be required to obtain FDA approval for such products, as they will remain exclusively under state-level pharmacy regulation.

At the same time, section 503B of the law regulates "outsourcing facilities" which conduct bulk compounding or are used as outsourcing for compounding by other pharmacies (and whose compounding activities "may or may not" be patient-specific based on individualized prescriptions.). Such outsourcing facilities can be explicitly authorized by the Food and Drug Administration and regulated accordingly, while also being exempted from certain requirements otherwise imposed on mass-producers.

Neither type of compounding is permitted for a drug product that is deemed to be "essentially a copy" of a mass-produced drug product; however, outsourcing pharmacies are subject to a broader statutory definition of "essentially a copy". For traditional, patient-specific compounding, the definition of "copy" was initially focused on drug products or ultimate dosage forms rather than drug substances or active ingredients, although in 2026, the FDA published guidance indicating that a broader a definition is allowed for custom-compounded agents.

Beyond the FDA's own positions regarding its statutory and constitutional authority over compounding, there have been industry disputes and court cases with varying levels of clarity on the matter. To the extent the FDA does have authority over compounding, it has stated it would weigh the following factors in deciding upon enforcement:

1. Compounding in anticipation of receiving prescriptions
2. Compounding drugs removed from the market for safety reasons
3. Compounding from bulk ingredients not approved by FDA
4. Receiving, storing, or using drugs not made in an FDA-registered facility
5. Receiving, storing, or using drugs' components not determined to meet compendia requirements
6. Using commercial-scale manufacturing or testing equipment
7. Compounding for third parties for resale
8. Compounding drugs that are essentially the same as commercially available products
9. Failing to operate in conformance with applicable state law

==== Responses to incidents ====
Poor practices on the part of drug compounders can result in contamination of products, or products that do not meet their stated strength, purity, or quality. Unless a complaint is filed or a patient is harmed, drugs made by compounders are seldom tested.

In 2002, the Food and Drug Administration, concerned about the rising number of accidents related to compounded medications, identified "red flag" factors and issued a guide devoted to human pharmacy compounding.

In October 2012, news reports surfaced of an outbreak of fungal meningitis tied to the New England Compounding Center, a pharmacy which engaged in bulk compounding. At that time it was also disclosed that the United States and Massachusetts state health regulators were aware in 2002 that steroid treatments from the New England Compounding Center could cause adverse patient reactions. In August 2013, further reports tied to that compounding center said that about 750 people were sickened, including 63 deaths, and that infections were linked to more than 17,600 doses of methylprednisolone acetate steroid injections used to treat back and joint pain that were shipped to 23 states.

Another incident was reported after at least 15 people at two Texas hospitals developed bacterial infections. All lots of medications dispensed since May 9, 2013, made by Specialty Compounding, LLC of Cedar Park, Texas were recalled. The hospitals reported as affected were Corpus Christi Medical Center Bay Area and Corpus Christi Medical Center Doctors Regional. The people had received intravenous infusions of calcium gluconate, a drug used to treat calcium deficiencies and too much potassium in the blood. Implicated in these cases is the Rhodococcus bacteria, which can cause symptoms such as fever and pain.

Such incidents bolstered claims that larger compounding pharmacies were acting like drug manufacturers and yet circumvented FDA regulations under the banner of compounding. Drugs from compounding pharmacies can be cheaper or alleviate shortages, but can pose greater risk of contamination due in part to the lack of oversight. "Non-traditional" compounders also behave like drug manufacturers in some cases, by having sales teams that market non-personalized drug products or production capability to doctors, making drugs that are essentially the same as commercially available mass-produced drug products, or preparing large batches of a given drug product in anticipation of additional prescriptions before actually receiving them.

The Drug Quality and Security Act of 2013 made it easier to identify misuse or misnomered-use and facilitated enforcement of the longstanding distinction between patient-specific compounding versus small-scale manufacturing. Some US states have also taken initiatives to strengthen oversight of compounding pharmacies. A major source of opposition to new Food and Drug Administration regulation on compounding is makers of dietary supplements.

The FDA's annual Report on the State of Pharmaceutical Quality found that from 2019 to 2024, 72% of regulatory actions (e.g. warning letters, import alerts, and regulatory meetings) were directed at facilities that produce Active Pharmaceutical Ingredients (API) that exclusively supply compounding pharmacies.

=== Canada ===
In Canada, pharmaceutical compounding is regulated through a combination of federal policies and provincial or territorial pharmacy regulatory authorities. Health Canada defines compounding as the preparation of a drug for an individual patient’s needs, as prescribed by an authorized health professional. It distinguishes compounding from manufacturing, which involves making drugs in bulk for sale or distribution and requires an Establishment Licence under the Food and Drugs Act.

Health Canada's policy document POL-0051: Policy on Manufacturing and Compounding Drug Products in Canada outlines that compounded products must be prepared in response to a patient-specific prescription. Preparations made in advance, in large quantities, or intended for resale are typically considered manufacturing and fall under federal regulatory requirements for commercial production.

Provincially, each jurisdiction enforces standards based on the model guidelines developed by the National Association of Pharmacy Regulatory Authorities (NAPRA). NAPRA has published three sets of model standards: for non-sterile compounding (2018), sterile compounding of non-hazardous preparations (2016), and hazardous sterile preparations (2016). These standards have been adopted by most provinces and territories, with implementation timelines varying by region. For example, the Ontario College of Pharmacists and the Alberta College of Pharmacy have required full compliance with the non-sterile standards as of 2022.

Pharmacies are required to assess the level of risk associated with each compound and ensure their facilities, equipment, and training are adequate to meet those standards. When a pharmacy cannot meet the necessary requirements for a specific compound, it must refer the prescription to a suitable facility.

Compounded medications in Canada are not subject to the same pre-market review and approval process as commercially manufactured drugs. Nonetheless, pharmacies play an essential role in patient care, particularly for individuals and healthcare professionals requiring customized formulations not available in the commercial market—such as for children, individuals with allergies, or animals.

== See also ==
- Apothecary - the ancestral practitioner of compounding, and their shop
- Bioidentical hormone replacement therapy - Compounding is involved in the surrounding controversy
- New England Compounding Center meningitis outbreak
- Professional Compounding Centers of America
