= Todos Juntos Podemos Parar el SIDA =

Mural by Keith Haring in Barcelona, Catalonia, Spain

Coordinates: 41.38276677374068°N 2.166018169858992°E

Todos Juntos Podemos Parar el Sida
- English: Together We Can Stop AIDS
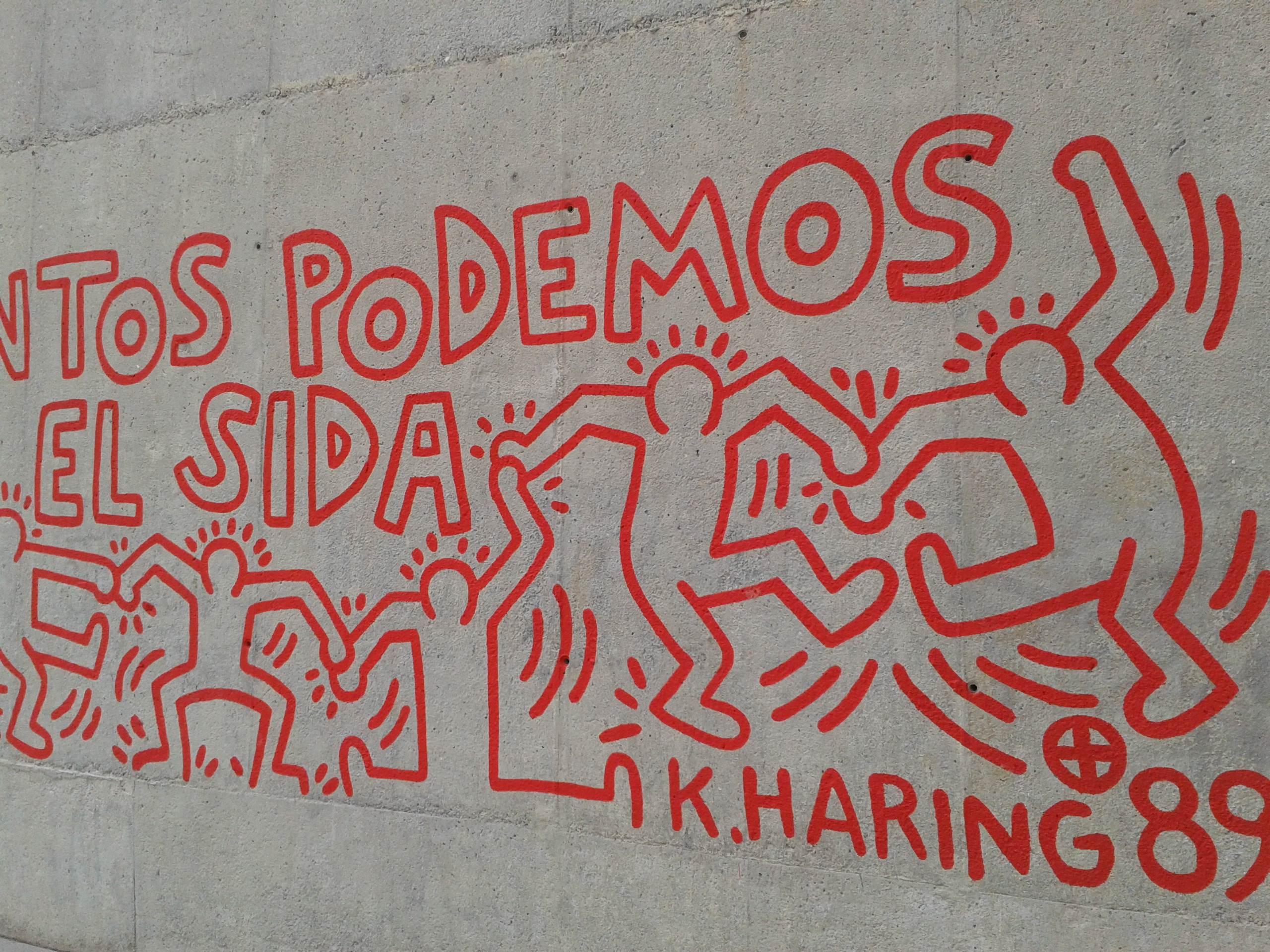
- Artist: Keith Haring
- Year: 1989
- Movement: Pop art
- Location: Barcelona, Catalonia, Spain
- Owner: Museu d'Art Contemporani de Barcelona

Todos Juntos Podemos Parar el SIDA (English: Together We Can Stop AIDS) is a mural created by American artist and social activist Keith Haring in 1989. The mural was painted to raise awareness of the AIDS epidemic. It is located next to the Museu d'Art Contemporani de Barcelona museum in the El Raval neighbourhood of Barcelona.

== Background ==
Raised in Kutztown, Pennsylvania, Haring moved to New York City to attend the School of Visual Arts in 1978. By the early 1980s, he was drawing graffiti in the New York City Subway, which led to him receiving exhibitions at art galleries. Between 1982 and 1989, Haring created more than 50 public works internationally.

Haring was openly gay and when the AIDS epidemic in the U.S. began, he used his work to advocate for safe sex. He was diagnosed with HIV/AIDS in 1987. He told Rolling Stone in 1989: "AIDS has made it even harder for people to accept, because homosexuality has been made to be synonymous with death. It's a justifiable fright with people that are just totally uninformed and therefore ignorant." In 1989, he created the Keith Haring Foundation to provide funding for AIDS organizations and children's programs. Haring died of AIDS-related complications on February 16, 1990.

== Installation ==
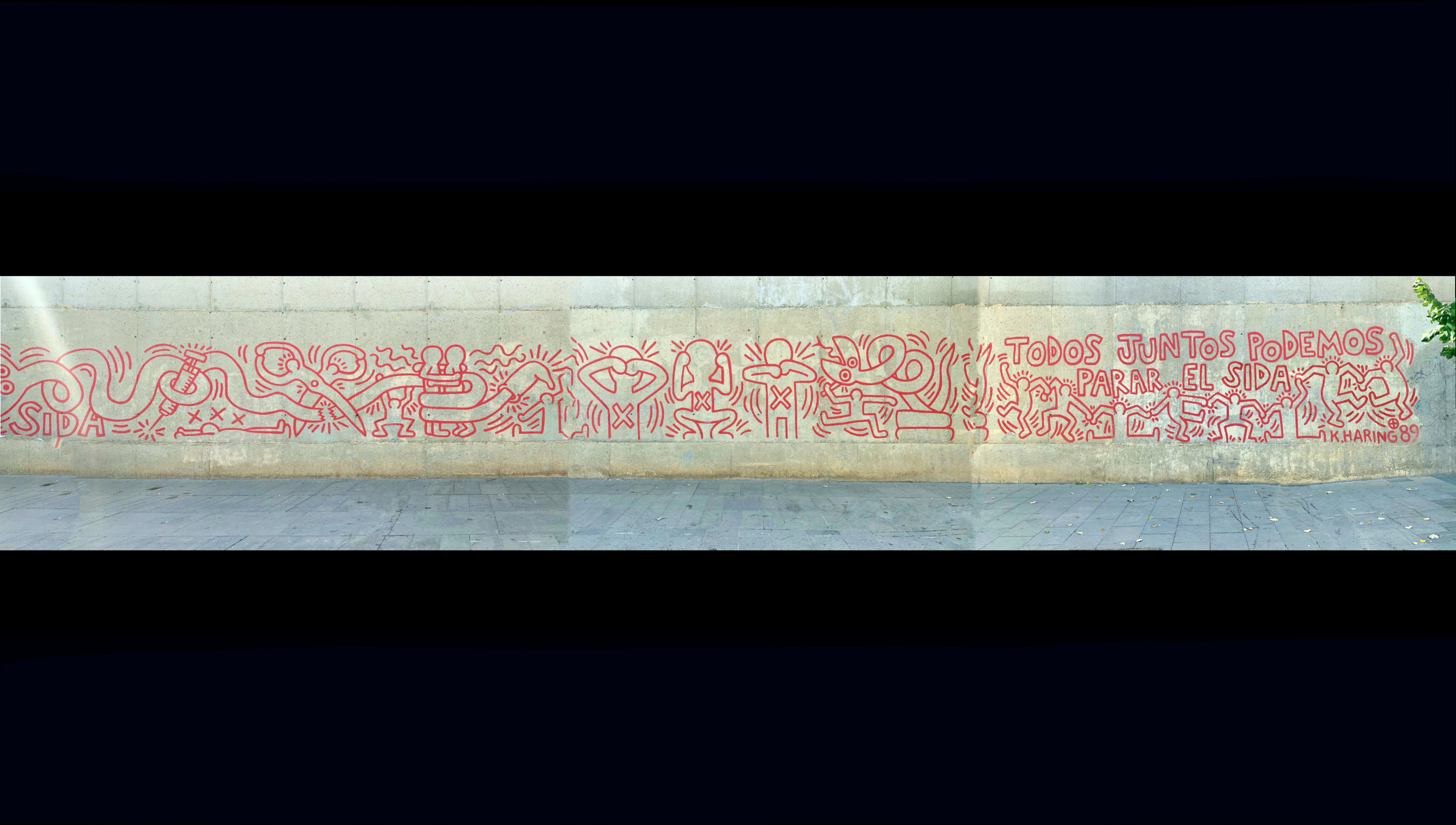
Reproduction of the mural in 2014

During Haring's trip back from Madrid in February 1989, Haring's friend Montse Guillén, owner of the restaurant El Internacional in New York, suggested that he create an AIDS awareness mural in Barcelona. Haring agreed under the condition that he chose the location. With permission from the Town Hall, Haring selected a square in the Raval, then a drug infested area known as the Barrio Chino ('Chinatown').

AIDS was a delicate issue and most celebrities generally didn't talk about the epidemic. Ferran Pujol, a member of the organization Hispano SIDA ('Hispanic AIDS') befriended Haring during his visit to Barcelona. Pujol explained that at the time Haring created the mural, people were "still so completely shocked at someone for having been diagnosed with HIV that the issue was never addressed". He said, "The people who had been diagnosed were avoided at all cost, and people speculated on who could be infected". Adding that "seeing someone who openly and explicitly referred to AIDS was very important".

The mural was painted on a concrete buttress in the Plaça de Salvador Seguí and contained many of Haring's famous trademark dancing figures, snakes, hypodermic syringes and the three figures of see no evil, speak no evil, hear no evil. In his journal, Haring wrote:

The wall had a strange slant to it, which made it awkward to paint on, but one of my favorite things about painting murals is the amount of adaptability (physically) you must put up with to accomplish the task. I found positions that were new to me to balance and keep the consistency required. Some of the best photos of this painting are of the body language and posture.

== Reconstructions ==
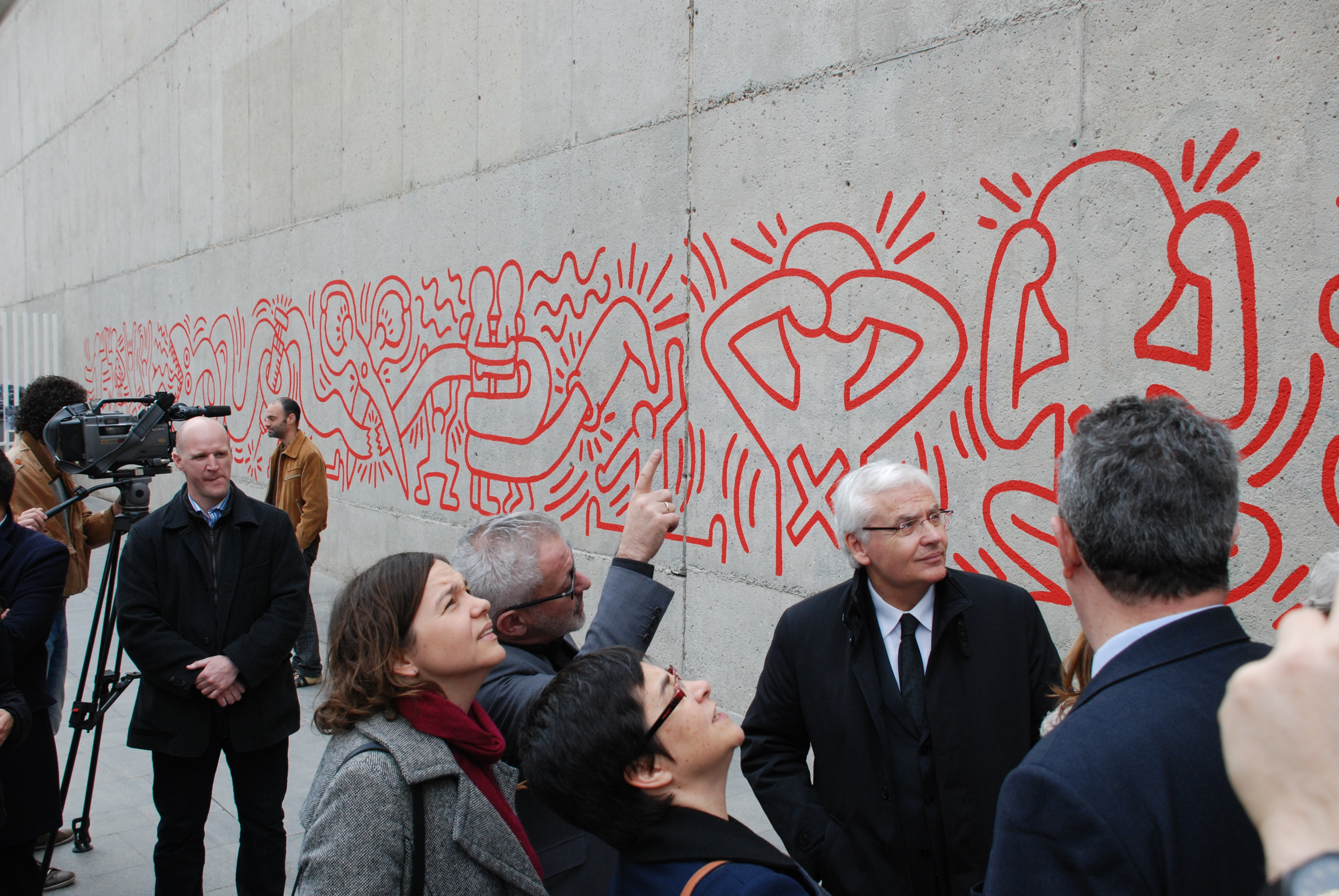
Catalan Counselor of Culture, Ferran Mascarell contemplates a detail of the mural pointed out by the director of the MACBA, Bartomeu Marí in 2014

Soon after its completion, the original mural was defaced by local graffiti artists and it was affected by environmental degradation. A few years later the building was scheduled to be demolished to make way for the Filmoteca de Catalunya. The City Hall reached an agreement with Haring's heirs and the nearby Museu d'Art Contemporani de Barcelona (MACBA) to transfer the piece, preserving the original design. In September 1992, a restoration team hired by the Ajuntament de Barcelona began the process of transferring the mural.

The mural has been recreated three times on a wall next to the MACBA, a few hundred meters from its original location. The current version was painted in 2014 for an event marking the 25th anniversary of the original.
