= Keith Haring Mural =

Mural by Keith Haring in Melbourne, Australia

- Collingwood Mural
- Artist: Keith Haring
- Year: 1984
- Movement: Pop art
- Condition: Restored
- Location: Collingwood, Melbourne
- Website: melbourneharingmural.com.au

The Keith Haring Mural is a mural created in 1984 by American artist Keith Haring. Located in Collingwood, Melbourne, the mural was added to the Victorian Heritage Register in 2004 for its historical, aesthetic and social significance to the State of Victoria.

== History ==
In 1978, Keith Haring moved to New York from Kutztown, Pennsylvania to attend the School of Visual Arts. In the early 1980s, he gained recognition for his chalk graffiti drawings in the New York City Subway, which led to him receiving exhibitions at art galleries. By the mid-1980s, his star was on the rise internationally. Haring's art was featured on the cover of Vanity Fair, he designed motifs for Madonna's outfits, and he was painting public works in cities around the world.

In 1984, John Buckley, inaugural director of the Australian Centre for Contemporary Art, invited Haring to spend three weeks in Australia. Haring's visit, which lasted from February 18 to March 9, 1984, was financially assisted by a grant from the Visual Board of the Australia Council.

During his stay in Australia, Haring participated in various public art events. He executed several body paintings during the Fashion Design Council's Moomba event "An Hour of High Velocity Fashion." He painted two ephemeral murals, one on the waterwall of the National Gallery of Victoria and the other one at the Art Gallery of New South Wales. He also created a permanent mural on the wall of the Collingwood Technical College in Melbourne. The school closed in 1987 when it amalgamated with the Preston College of TAFE. It is now known as Collingwood Yards.

The yellow background of the Collingwood mural was painted by students of the Collingwood Technical College on March 5, 1984. The next day, Keith Haring painted the red and green figures.

The Collingwood mural is now one of only 31 known surviving murals across the world by Haring. Haring produced more than 50 public artworks between 1982 and 1989, many were created voluntarily for hospitals, day care centers, and schools. In recognition of its significance, the mural was added to the Victorian Heritage Register in 2004. In 2010, Creative Victoria (then Arts Victoria) took over management of the Collingwood site where the mural is located and initiated a project to conserve the mural. In 2013, Arts Victoria commissioned Italian conservator Antonio Rava to restore the mural.
