= Crack Is Wack =

Mural by Keith Haring in New York City

- The second and current version of Crack Is Wack
- Artist: Keith Haring
- Year: 1986
- Movement: Pop art
- Condition: Restored
- Location: East Harlem, Manhattan, New York
- 40°48′17.1″N 73°55′54.6″W

Crack Is Wack is a mural created in 1986 by American artist and social activist Keith Haring. Located near the Harlem River Drive in the East Harlem neighborhood of Manhattan in New York City, the mural serves as a warning against crack cocaine use, which was rampant in major cities across the United States during the mid to late 1980s.

== Historical context ==
Haring's anti-crack mural emerged during a period of intense political tension in the United States due to widespread illegal drug use. Crack cocaine became popular in poor and working-class neighborhoods in major U.S. cities like New York during the 1980s. The number of regular crack users nationwide spiked from approximately 4.2 million to 5.8 million from 1985 to 1989. As public concerns over this 'crack epidemic' grew, President Ronald Reagan strengthened drug prohibition policies and the severity of their penalties in accordance with the government's so-called 'war on drugs'. Crack Is Wack thus functions as a public announcement to warn New Yorkers against the physiological and legal repercussions of crack cocaine.

== Motivation ==
In addition to its relevance on a national scale, Crack Is Wack pertains to Haring's personal experiences. Although he admitted to taking hallucinogens as a method of rebellion and valued their "mind-expanding" power as inspiration for his art, Haring was highly opposed to crack cocaine. He considered it "a businessman's drug" designed to profit the supplier and make the user aggressive, irrational, and addicted. During the height of the crack epidemic, Haring's studio assistant and friend Benny started to abuse the drug. After various failed attempts to help Benny overcome his addiction, in addition to his own rising frustration towards the government's inability to curb the epidemic, Haring decided to create the anti-drug mural in Benny's honor.

== Installation ==
Without having been commissioned—or even given legal permission at all—Haring set out to create Crack Is Wack on the wall of an abandoned handball court in a park at 2nd Avenue and East 128th Street on June 27, 1986. Upon the completion of the mural, Haring was arrested by the New York City Police Department for vandalism of city property and faced potential jail time in addition to heavy fines. However, media sources like The Washington Post and The New York Post, and even city locals themselves verbalized their support of Haring's mural. Haring pled guilty to a reduced charge, of disorderly conduct, was ordered to pay a $100 fine. Soon after, the mural was vandalized and transformed into a pro-crack mural that read ''Crack Is It." Therefore, it was painted over in gray by the New York City Department of Parks and Recreation. The Parks Department commissioner Henry J. Stern invited Haring to paint a new mural, offering him eight sites, the paint, and the use of a van. Haring decided to repaint the original site on October 3, 1986. The new version relays the same style and anti-drug message but exhibits a new arrangement of different figures on both sides of the handball court.

== Analysis ==
Crack Is Wack combines the striking, cartoon-like designs of graffiti and pop art, which reflects Haring's lifelong admiration of individuals like producer and animator Walt Disney and leading pop artist Andy Warhol and the ways in which they influenced his work. Haring's unique style developed first in his earliest drawings on expired advertisement panels throughout the New York City Subway system upon which he drew bold yet simplistic images with white chalk. The distinct lines and dynamic poses of the figures in these subway drawings mirror the figures present in Crack Is Wack and thus have become symbolic of Haring's work and have largely contributed to his status as an internationally recognized artist.

== Scholarly responses ==
Although the current and original versions of Crack Is Wack differ, they both express Haring's unique cartoonist style and the same anti-crack message. Upon a vibrant orange background, the mural includes a conglomeration of human and monster-like figures outlined by thick black lines that surround the phrase 'crack is wack' in bold letters. Art history professor Natalie E. Phillips argues that Haring achieves a direct and straightforward means of expression by utilizing this simple imagery and basic forms in Crack Is Wack and his other artwork. She further suggests that the mural's location along a busy, public parkway engages a variety of passersby with diverse backgrounds. Author and art critic Bruce D. Kurtz expands upon this point by suggesting that the intentional lack of gender, race, and age in Haring's figures gives his artwork a sense of accessibility to all people. (Note: As cited by Phillips 2007, p. 62.) Crack Is Wack ultimately conveys an important message against crack cocaine to a variety of viewers while simultaneously showcasing Haring's notable artistic ability.

== Restoration efforts ==
In 2007, the Keith Haring estate financed the first restoration of Crack Is Wack. A group of artists titled Gotham Scenic who specialize in set design and mural restoration carried out the extensive repainting of the mural. Following the first restoration, natural deterioration elicited further repainting efforts in 2012. The Keith Haring Foundation sponsored the most recent and by far the most extensive restoration, which was completed in 2019 by artists Louise Hunnicutt and William Tibbals. In order to slow future exfoliation of the mural, a more durable paint system was employed. Stencils of Haring's original designs were first created and pounced on top of the wall's concrete base, followed by the removal of all loose paint. After appropriate patching and sealing of the wall, several base coats of fixative and then color-matched paint were applied. Haring's designs were finally repainted using the aforementioned stencils and by consulting original photographs of the mural.
