= Antoni Miralda =

Spanish artist

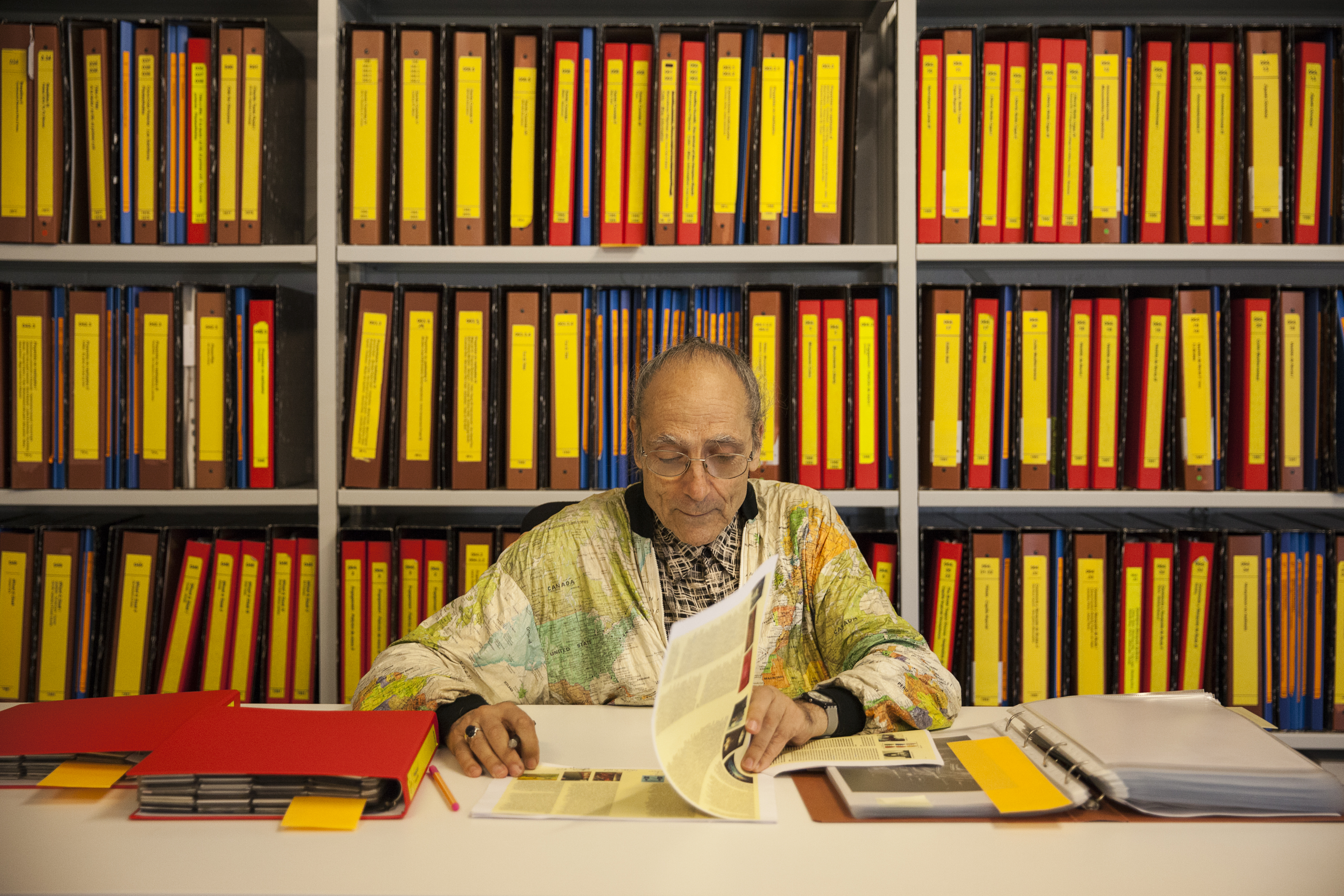
- Born: Antoni Miralda; 1942; Terrassa
- Website: https://stomakdigital.org

Antoni Miralda (born 1942) is a Spanish multidisciplinary artist.

== Biography ==
Miralda was born in Terrassa, Barcelona, in 1942 where he grew up in the atmosphere of a textile manufacturing town. After military service, he moved to Paris in 1962, starting to create sculptural objects and drawings while making a living through his work in photography for fashion magazines.

Beginning various series of sculptures working with toy soldiers, he exhibited in Paris, London and other European cities. In 1967 he began to create 'food sculptures' working with organic materials and with objects from popular culture. He also started to collaborate with other artists in creating participatory events with colored food and ceremonial rituals. The small-scale work evolved into large constructions in public sites while the private events grew into complex public ceremonial events involving ritual and color.

In 1971, he moved to New York City, and since then he has lived and worked in the United States and Europe creating public art and installations. In 1979 he was a fellow of the center for advanced Visual Studies at M.I.T., and began to create a series of art videos and other documentary works. From 1986 to 1992 he developed the Honeymoon Project, a multi-site, international art project of the symbolic wedding of New York's Statue of Liberty with the Columbus Monument in Barcelona.

His projects have engaged international art audiences in Documenta VI, at the XVII São Paulo Bienal, at his retrospective exhibition organized by the Caixa de Barcelona and Valencia's IVAM, and at the Venice Biennale in 1990. His street events in New York City, Kansas City, Las Vegas and Aspen, and his exhibitions in Houston, Philadelphia and Miami, among others, have introduced Miralda's work to the general public in North America.

Major publications on Miralda's work include Pierre Restany's Une Vie d'Artiste, the monograph Mona a Barcelona of his exhibition at the Joan Prats Gallery, and the catalog of his retrospective at Barcelona's Fundacion 'la Caixa' and Valencia's IVAM, MIRALDA Obras 1965–1995. Others include the catalog of his installation at the Spanish Pavilion in Venice, the catalog of Santa Comida at El Museo del Barrio and the catalog of his retrospective of drawings, ME NUS at the Palau de la Virreina in Barcelona and Sa Nostra at Palma de Mallorca. Antoni Miralda with the Catalan artist Antoni Muntadas held a collective exhibition at the PalmaDotze Gallery in Santa Margarida los Monjos (Penedés Valley) to celebrate its 30th anniversary.

In addition to projects in the Biennials of Istanbul and Montreal, he designed the Food Pavilion at EXPO 2000 in Hannover Germany. He is currently launching the Food Cultura Museum and his projects for the Internet, including Grandmother's Recipes and the virtual archive of his collections.

Miralda won the 2018 Velázquez Prize for Plastic Arts, endowed with 100,000 euros, granted by the Spanish Ministry of Education and Culture. The prize is awarded for the entire career of an Hispanic artist.

== Selected projects ==
- Soldats Soldés. París, 1965–1973.
- París. La Cumparsita, co-author Benet Rossell. 1972.
- Miralda-Selz. Traiteurs Coloristes, co-author Dorothée Selz. París, 1967–1973.
- Cenotafios. París, 1969–1975.
- Patriotic Banquet. Nueva York, 1972–1973.
- Movable Feast. Nueva York, 1974.
- Fest für Leda. Dokumenta 6, Kassel, 1977.
- Charlie Taste Point. Berlín, 1979.
- Mona a Barcelona. Barcelona, 1980.
- Wheat & Steak. Kansas City, 1981.
- Santa Comida. New York, Miami, Barcelona, París, 1984–1989.
- El Internacional Tapas Bar & Restaurant, co-author Montse Guillén. Nueva York, 1984–1986.
- Honeymoon Project. Diversas localizaciones, 1986–1992.
- Sabores y Lenguas / Food Cultura. Diversas localizaciones, 1997–2007.
- Food Pavilion. Hannover, Expo2000.
- FoodCulturaMuseum. Barcelona, 2003–2007.
- Oda a la papa, Lima, 2008.

== Selected exhibitions ==
- Institute of Contemporary Arts, London, 1966.
- Galerie Claude Givaudan, Paris (con Dorothée Selz), 1970.
- Hanover Gallery, London, 1970.
- Eat Art Gallery, Düsseldorf (con Dorothée Selz), 1971.
- Art Gallery of New South Wales, Sydney, 1973.
- Breadline, Contemporary Arts Museum, Houston, Texas, 1977.
- Nelson Atkins Museum of Art, Kansas City, Missouri, 1981.
- Fundació Joan Miró, Barcelona, 1988.
- Philadelphia Museum of Art, Philadelphia, 1990.
- Holly Solomon Gallery, New York, 1991.
- Palau de la Virreina, Barcelona, 1995.
- Fundació "la Caixa", Barcelona, 1995.
- Institut Valencia d’ Art Modern IVAM, Valencia, 1995.
- Galerie de France, París, 1997.
- Miami Art Museum, Miami, 1998.
- EXPO 2000, Hannover, 2000.
- Museo de Bellas Artes, Caracas, 2004.
- Museo de Arte Moderno de Buenos Aires, 2007.
- Power Food, Artium, Vitoria, 2008.
- Power Food, Es Baluard, Palma de Mallorca, 2009.
- Musée International des Arts Modestes, Sète, 2009.
- De gustibus non disputandum, Palacio Velázquez. Museo Nacional Centro de Arte Reina Sofía, Madrid, 2010.
- Food. Ginebra, São Paulo, Marsella 2013–2014.

== Notes ==
=== See also ===
- El Internacional Tapas Bar & Restaurant

=== External links ===
- Article Art As Pageant, Miami New Time News, 29 October 1998.
- Article Comer es poder, El País, 7 March 2009.
- Cuaderns de la Mediterrania num 15. IEMed, Valentín Roma.
