= El Internacional (New York City) =

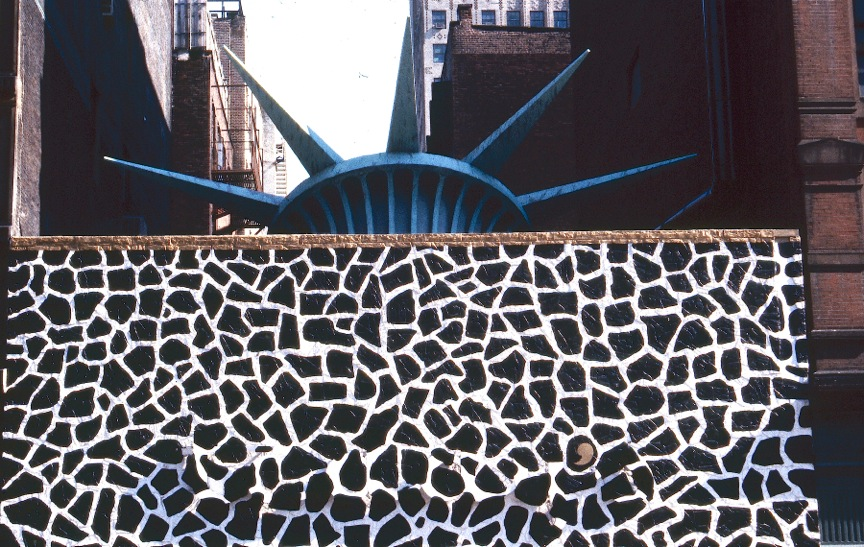
- Facade of El Internacional Tapas Bar & Restaurant
- Interactive map of El Internacional

Restaurant information
- Established: 1984
- Closed: 1986
- Previous owners: Antoni Miralda; Montse Guillén
- Chef: Montse Guillén
- Food type: Tapas bar
- Location: 219 West Broadway, New York City, New York, United States
- Coordinates: 40.7191°N 74.0062°W

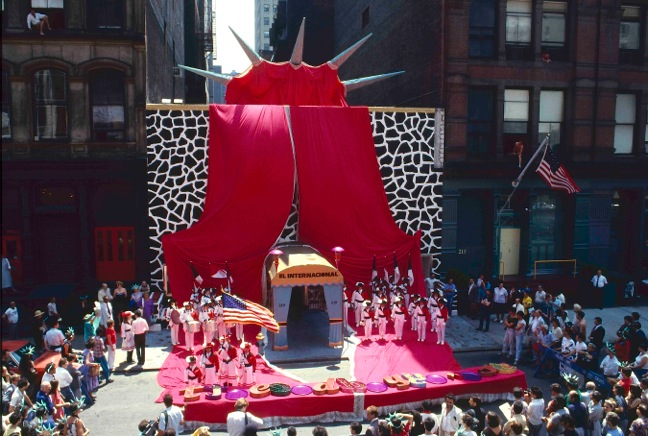
The Crowning Ceremony, July 15, 1985

El Internacional Tapas Bar & Restaurant was conceived as an artistic project and social experiment, carried out between 1984 and 1986 by artist Antoni Miralda and chef Montse Guillén in the Tribeca neighborhood of Manhattan, New York City. It was an initiative which blended contemporary art and cuisine. The restaurant's became an iconic symbol of the New York scene of the 1980s. The project engaged food, sensorial experiences and installation art as vehicles and rituals for transmitting and subverting traditions and blending social practices of the time. El Internacional was seen as a point of convergence for the artistic community, and, at the same time, as a real place that engaged neighbors and celebrities alike in its culinary inventions and exotic allure. El Internacional was an ongoing process of the almost 3-year day-by-day creation of a work of installation and performance art.

El Internacional was a team project and a collective work of art. The space framed the experience and interactions around food as clients ended up being participants in a multi-layered experience few had imagined. The visit led to unexpected situations and stimulating relationships between art, design, architecture and the mass media.

== History ==
El Internacional was the first restaurant to introduce the tapas in the United States. The tapas recreated the presence of Spain, the Mediterranean, Catalonia, and Barcelona, as filtered by through the personal visions of Miralda and Montse Guillén. At the time, Miralda was preparing his traveling work, Honeymoon Project, in which a series of ceremonial events would commemorate the imaginary wedding between the monuments of Columbus in Barcelona and Statue of Liberty in the Upper New York Bay from 1985 to 1992.

=== Location ===
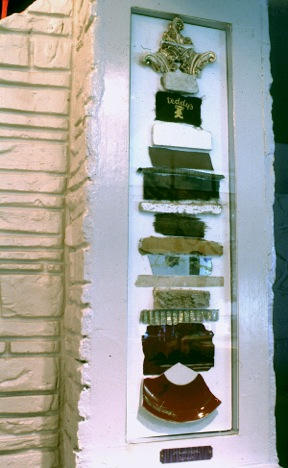
The Archaeological Sandwich display case

The El Internacional project began with the choosing of its location. In the 1970s, Miralda had lived across the street from Teddy's, a Tribeca restaurant, and was fascinated by the presence of this restaurant, unaware of its history. Between 1920 and 1945 Teddy’s was believed to have been a popular restaurant serving German food, located at 217 West Broadway where Edgar Allan Poe had supposedly lived. In 1945 the owner, Teddy Bartel, sold the restaurant to Sal Cucinotta who would build, at 217 and 219 West Broadway, the luxuriously emblematic Italian restaurant Teddy’s, which attracted numerous stars from the movie and entertainment industry in the '50s and '60s. At the end of the '60s, while under new management, the façade and interior of the building were renovated once more, but the restaurant ended up closing supposedly due to Mafia connections.

Miralda and Guillén described the El Internacional project as a contemporary archaeological space, an actual Archaeological Sandwich that Miralda reproduced on one of the walls and on which he placed elements found and collected during rebuilding, encrusting them into the walls rather like the layers of an ancient archeological site. The El Internacional project thus became the melding of Teddy’s and El Internacional as a dynamic melting pot of design, architecture, art, fashion and cuisine.

== Description ==
=== Interior ===
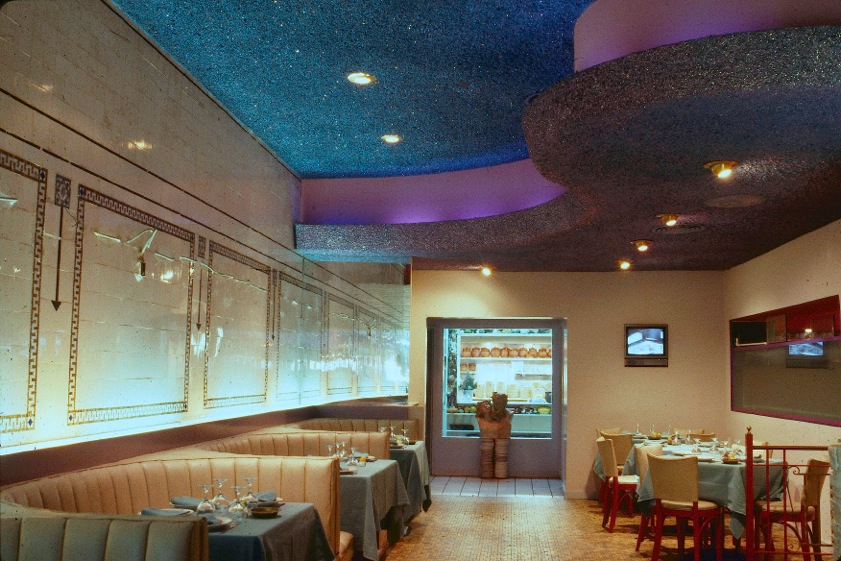
The Turquoise Dining Room, on the back the open kitchen

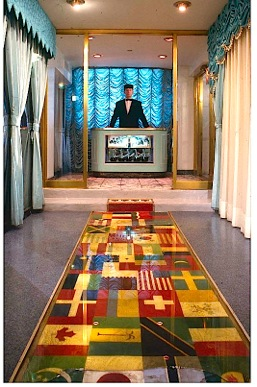
The carpet Flag Entrance, on the way of the bar

The façade was redrawn on the existing one, like an optical illusion, and the building underwent a total transfiguration without erasing its previous architecture. Beneath the new façade, the camouflaged name of Teddy’s was still present. From the street, the restaurant appeared to be like an enigmatic construction site/work of art causing unexpected reactions from the onlookers. The first thing visitors saw when arriving at the Terraza Sol y Sombra that had cans of beverages encrusted into the sidewalk (Coca-Cola and other soda cans) like relics or fossils, and a window where the Video Menu was shown on a monitor that presented the dishes, drinks and experiences available inside. Through the front window one could see the bar, and at the end, the kitchen window, this being one of the first open kitchens that existed in the city. Patrons got to the restaurant through the Flag Entrance, a floor comprising flags from numerous countries symbolizing and celebrating the diversity of New York, and then on to the Columbus Trophy Bar, with the presence of the Columbus Column of Barcelona on the bottles, and the famous cocktail Blue Margarita created at El Internacional.

The tour continued through the 4 theme rooms. First was the Turquoise Dining Room which incorporated a wall of tiles, white, turquoise and gilt from the 20s found during refurbishment. After that was the Carnation Room, a dining room in which the walls became an atlas of kisses where the diners would make the place their own by writing comments on the walls and leaving their kisses. Then, the Sentimental Room had the video installation of images of the celebrities that frequented the golden era of Teddy’s – Elizabeth Taylor, Groucho Marx, Anthony Quinn, and Sophia Loren, among others. Finally, the Marina Room where four dried and salted cods presided over the dining room from the floor and the Sweet Ceiling was decorated with meringue-like stalactites. The wall that separated the Turquoise and Carnation Rooms was an aquarium from which visitors could see the Mermaid - brought back by Miralda from Bahia, Brazil - representing Yemoja, the goddess patron of the ocean and of motherhood.

Other objects such as the Lobster Dream Lamp, the Matador Candelabra, the Black World Expresso, the Barcelona-New York Wedding Cake and the Liberty Crown Brochette marked the restaurant as a cultural destination, unusual museum, and adventurous cuisine and lively social spectacle.

=== Events ===
At El Internacional events were a hybrid of celebration, food and performance such as Face to Face in which 70 pairs of twins on Valentine’s Day would sit in front of identical dishes with different tastes, or the Crowning Ceremony during which the roof of the building was fitted with a life size replica of the crown of the Statue of Liberty. Others included the Porrón Olympics, the Miami Vice Shooting, The Original Rapper by Lou Reed and the Saturday Night Live Show. El Internacional Newspaper was given to clients as they entered, as part of the menu. Four issues were published, each one printed in a different color, with texts about the environment and the food. The international, multi-lingual staff of the restaurant was integrated into all aspects of the operation and even the customers were influenced by the aesthetics of the place and ended up wearing black and white like the façade.

=== Legacy ===
El Internacional was part and witness of a social and cultural chronicle of Tribeca, originally an industrial area to which the artistic community started to move at the start of the 1980s. It was a destination, especially at night, with the Palladium in Midtown and the Area Night Club in Tribeca, both places that also began to mean fusion at the time. Celebrities among its clientele included Andy Warhol, Sara Montiel, Jean Michel Basquiat, Pina Bausch, Robert de Niro, David Byrne, Umberto Eco, Antonio Gades, Keith Haring, Michael Douglas, Grace Jones, Diane Keaton, John F. Kennedy Jr., David Lynch, and Frank Zappa, among others.

The interest generated by El Internacional, also had great repercussions in the media: television, press and magazines such as The New York Times, New York Magazine, The Village Voice, The Face magazine, Architectural Record, Metropolis, and Gourmet magazine. For years the image of the crown of the Statue of Liberty on the roof of the restaurant and the bar became the opening title sequence of the NBC TV Network’s Saturday Night Live Show. El Internacional and its Tapas Bar was the unofficial landmark of cool downtown in 80’s New York. A few clear shots of the restaurant can be seen in the warehouse explosion scene from the 1986 movie Legal Eagles.

Shortly after Miralda and Montse Guillen withdrew from the day-to-day running of El Internacional to inaugurate in the same year, 1986, the Honeymoon Project, the identity of the restaurant and the management changed. The restaurant became El Teddy’s, specializing in Mexican food. In 2000, Steven Elghanyan, from the Epic development firm, bought the building from Sal Cucinotta for nearly 3 million dollars and started what was to be a long, intense debate seeking to prevent the immediate demolition of the building, its memory and its iconic crown, with the support of the City Landmarks Preservation Commission and the neighbors. The case was lost and the restaurant was demolished to make way for a new 7-story apartment building in 2004.
