= Keith Haring =

American artist and social activist (1958–1990)

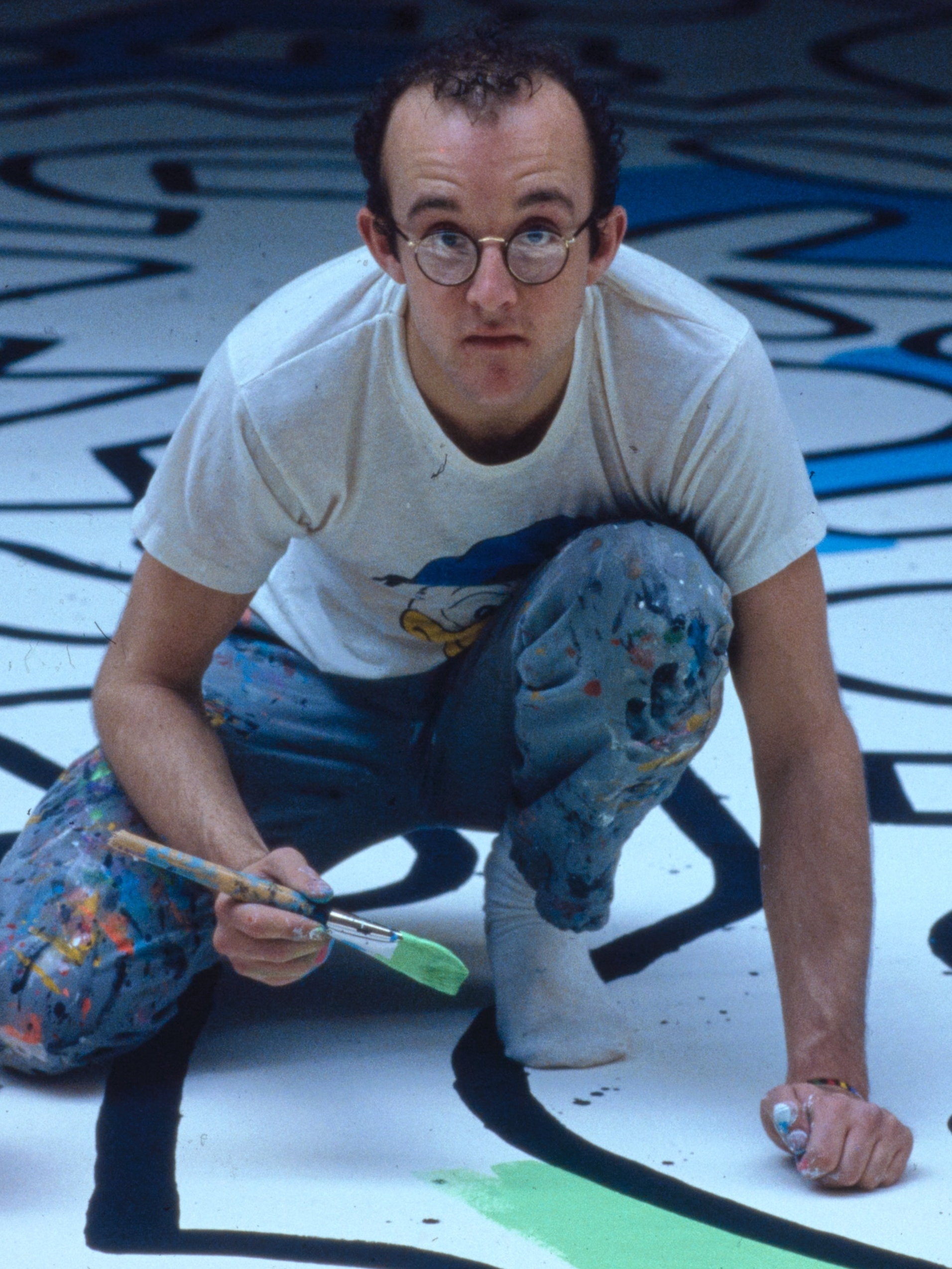
- Haring in 1985
- Born: Keith Allen Haring; May 4, 1958; Kutztown, Pennsylvania, U.S.
- Died: February 16, 1990 (aged 31); New York City, U.S.
- Cause of death: Complications from AIDS
- Education: Ivy School of Professional Art; School of Visual Arts
- Notable work: Keith Haring Mural (1984); Crack Is Wack (1986); Tower (1987); Todos Juntos Podemos Parar el SIDA (1989); Tuttomondo (1989)
- Movement: Pop art; street art
- Partner(s): Juan Dubose (1981–1986); Juan Rivera (1986–1989)
- Website: haring.com

Signature
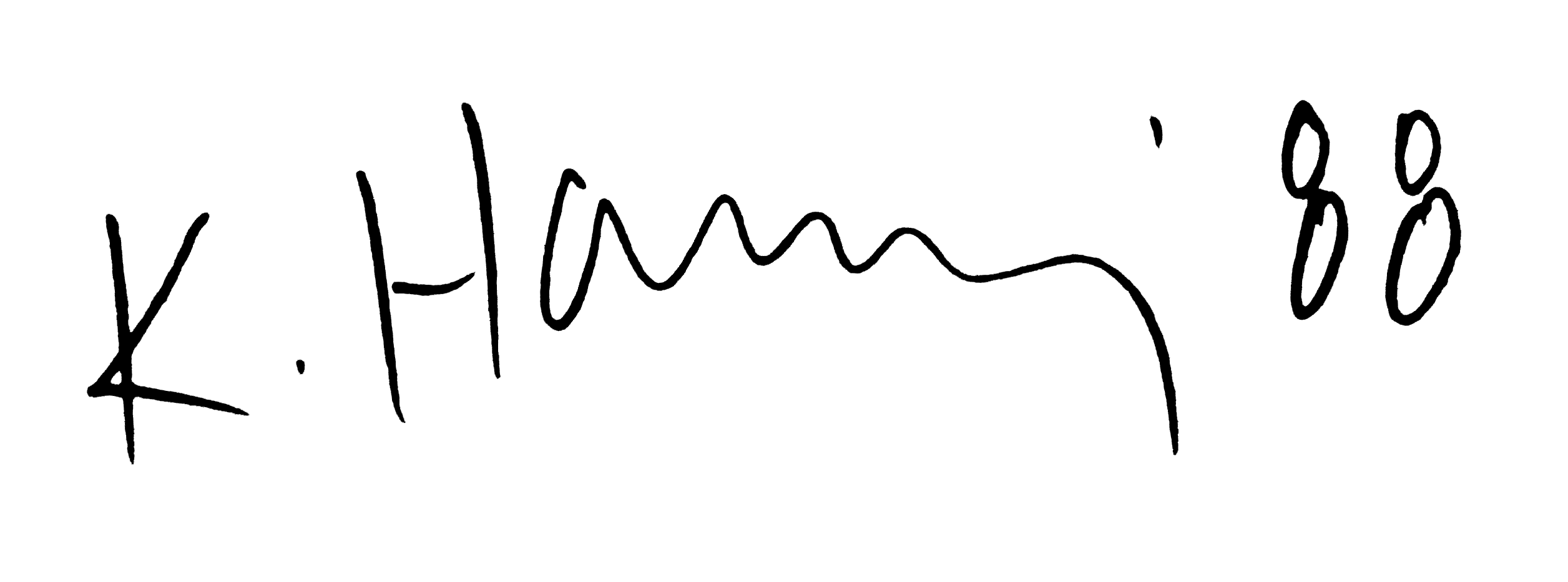

Keith Allen Haring (May 4, 1958 – February 16, 1990) was an American artist and activist. Emerging from New York City's downtown art and graffiti scenes in the early 1980s, he transformed subway chalk drawings into an internationally celebrated career that bridged street art and Pop art.

Haring first gained public attention through spontaneous white-chalk drawings on unused black advertising panels in New York City subway stations, featuring crawling babies, barking dogs, dancing figures, and other animated symbols. As his reputation grew, he gained gallery representation and produced large-scale paintings and sculptures. Between 1982 and 1989, he created more than 50 public murals, many of them voluntarily for hospitals, schools, and community spaces.

Much of Haring's work addressed political and social issues, including anti-apartheid activism, the crack epidemic, homosexuality, safe sex, and AIDS awareness, often using his own iconography to communicate urgent messages. In 1986, he opened the Pop Shop to make his art widely accessible through affordable merchandise. In addition to solo exhibitions, he participated in major international shows including documenta in Kassel, the Whitney Biennial in New York, the São Paulo Biennial, and the Venice Biennale. After Haring died of AIDS-related complications in 1990, the Whitney Museum of American Art organized a retrospective of his work in 1997.

Haring’s legacy has also been recognized within LGBTQ history. In 2014, he was among the inaugural honorees of the Rainbow Honor Walk in San Francisco, a walk of fame recognizing LGBTQ people who made significant contributions in their fields. In 2019, he was one of the inaugural 50 American "pioneers, trailblazers, and heroes" inducted onto the National LGBTQ Wall of Honor at the Stonewall Inn in New York City.

== Biography ==
=== Early life and education: 1958–1979 ===
Haring was born at Community General Hospital in Reading, Pennsylvania, on May 4, 1958. He was raised in Kutztown, Pennsylvania, by his mother, Joan Haring, and father, Allen Haring, an engineer and amateur cartoonist. He had three younger sisters, Kay, Karen and Kristen. He became interested in art at a very young age, spending time with his father producing creative drawings. His early influences included Walt Disney cartoons, Dr. Seuss, Charles Schulz, and the Looney Tunes characters in The Bugs Bunny Show.

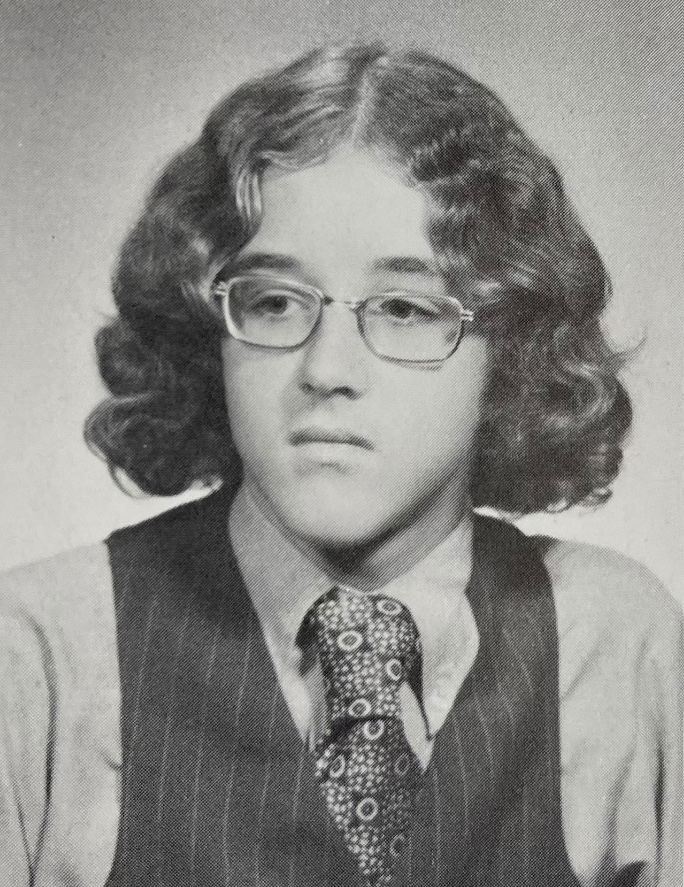
Haring as a senior at Kutztown Area High School in 1976

Haring's family attended the United Church of Christ. In his early teenage years, he was involved with the Jesus movement. He later hitchhiked across the country, selling T-shirts he made featuring the Grateful Dead and anti-Nixon designs. He graduated from Kutztown Area High School in 1976. He studied commercial art from 1976 to 1978 at Pittsburgh's Ivy School of Professional Art, but eventually lost interest, inspired to focus on his own art after reading The Art Spirit (1923) by Robert Henri.

Haring had a maintenance job at the Pittsburgh Arts and Crafts Center and was able to explore the art of Jean Dubuffet, Jackson Pollock, and Mark Tobey. He was highly influenced around this time by a 1977 retrospective of Pierre Alechinsky's work and by a lecture that the sculptor Christo gave in 1978. From Alechinsky's work, he felt encouraged to create large images that featured writing and characters. From Christo, Haring was introduced to ways of incorporating the public into his art. His first significant exhibition was in Pittsburgh Arts and Crafts Center in 1978.

Haring moved to the Lower East Side of New York in 1978 to study painting at the School of Visual Arts. He also worked as a busboy during this time at the nightclub Danceteria. While attending school he studied semiotics with Bill Beckley and experimented with video and performance art. Haring was also highly influenced in his art by author William Burroughs. In 1978, Haring wrote in his journal: "I am becoming much more aware of movement. The importance of movement is intensified when a painting becomes a performance. The performance (the act of painting) becomes as important as the resulting painting."

=== Early work and breakthrough: 1980–1982 ===
Haring first gained public attention for his subway drawings. Beginning in December 1980, he created white chalk images on black, unused advertising panels in New York City subway stations. He considered the subways to be his "laboratory," a place where he could experiment and create his artwork and saw the black advertisement paper as a free space and "the perfect place to draw". The Radiant Baby, a crawling infant emitting rays of light, became his most recognized symbol. He used it as his tag to sign his work while a subway artist. He developed a "vocabulary" with his images (such as barking dogs, flying saucers, and figures dancing) that became common in his iconography and his work became increasingly more recognizable.

The cut-up technique in the writings of William S. Burroughs and Brion Gysin inspired Haring's work with lettering and words. In 1980, he created headlines from word juxtaposition and attached hundreds to lamp-posts around Manhattan. These included phrases like "Reagan Slain by Hero Cop" and "Pope Killed for Freed Hostage". That same year, as part of his participating in The Times Square Show with one of his earliest public projects, Haring altered a banner advertisement above a subway entrance in Times Square that showed a female embracing a male's legs, blacking-out the first letter so that it essentially read "hardón" instead of "Chardón," a French clothing brand. In 1980, Haring also began organizing exhibitions at Club 57, which were filmed by his close friend, photographer Tseng Kwong Chi.

In February 1981, Haring had his first solo exhibition at Westbeth Painters Space in the West Village. While painting a frieze at P.S. 22 during the summer of 1981, Haring met graffiti artist Angel "LA II" Ortiz, who would become a key collaborator. Ortiz filled in Haring's drawings with squiggles and his graffiti tags "LA2" and "LA ROCK." Haring felt his "'signature' is a typically New York version of what I feel is as close as the Western World has gotten to a stylized form of writing similar to Eastern calligraphy." Their partnership marked an important shift from street-based tagging to institutional recognition. In November 1981, Hal Bromm Gallery in Tribeca presented the artist's first solo exhibition at a commercial gallery.

In January 1982, Haring was the first of twelve artists organized by Public Art Fund to display work on the computer-animated Spectacolor billboard in Times Square. That summer, Haring created his first major outdoor mural on the Houston Bowery Wall on the Lower East Side. In his paintings, he often used lines to show energy and movement. One of his works, Untitled (1982), depicts two figures with a radiant heart-love motif, which critics have interpreted as a bold nod to homosexual love and a significant cultural statement.

In 1982, Haring participated in documenta 7 in Kassel, where his works were exhibited alongside Joseph Beuys, Anselm Kiefer, Gerhard Richter, Cy Twombly, Jean-Michel Basquiat and Andy Warhol. That year, he was in several group exhibitions, including Fast at the Alexander Milliken Gallery in New York. In October 1982, he held a solo exhibition at the Tony Shafrazi Gallery in SoHo, which was met with positive reviews. As ARTnews observed, "Haring's images are direct, witty and up-front. Beneath all his activity and the more recent publicity and high prices—Haring has an intelligent understanding of the nature of our culture."

=== Rise to fame and mainstream success: 1983–1986 ===
In February 1983, Haring had a solo exhibition at the Fun Gallery in the East Village, Manhattan. That year, Haring participated in the São Paulo Biennale in Brazil and the Whitney Biennial in New York. He also designed the poster for the 1983 Montreux Jazz Festival in Switzerland. In April 1983, Haring was commissioned to paint a mural, Construction Fence, at the construction site of the Haggerty Museum of Art in Milwaukee. Later that year, Haring took part in the exhibition Urban Pulses: the Artist and the City in Pittsburgh by spray painting a room at the Pittsburgh Center for the Arts and creating an outdoor mural at PPG Place. In October 1983, Elio Fiorucci invited Haring to Milan to paint the walls of his Fiorucci store. While Haring was in London for the opening of his exhibition at the Robert Fraser Gallery in October 1983, he met and began collaborating with choreographer Bill T. Jones. Haring used Jones' body as the canvas to paint from head to toe.

Haring and Angel "LA II" Ortiz produced a T-shirt design for friends Willi Smith and Laurie Mallet's clothing label WilliWear Productions in 1984. After Haring was profiled in Paper magazine, fashion designer Vivienne Westwood reached out to editor-in-chief Kim Hastreiter to facilitate a meeting with Haring. Haring presented Westwood with two large sheets of drawings and she turned them into textiles for her Autumn/Winter 1983–84 Witches collection. Haring's friend Madonna wore a skirt from the collection, most notably in the music video her 1984 single "Borderline."

Although Haring became a successful gallery artist, he continued to draw in the subways, contrasting the rocketing prices for his work. Haring enjoyed giving his work away for free, often handing out free buttons and posters of his work. Haring's swift rise to international celebrity status was covered by the media. His art appeared on the cover of Vanity Fair (February 1984), he was photographed by Andy Warhol for Vogue Paris (April 1984), and he was featured in Newsweek (October 1984). In July 1984, Haring painted singer Grace Jones for the first time for Interview magazine.

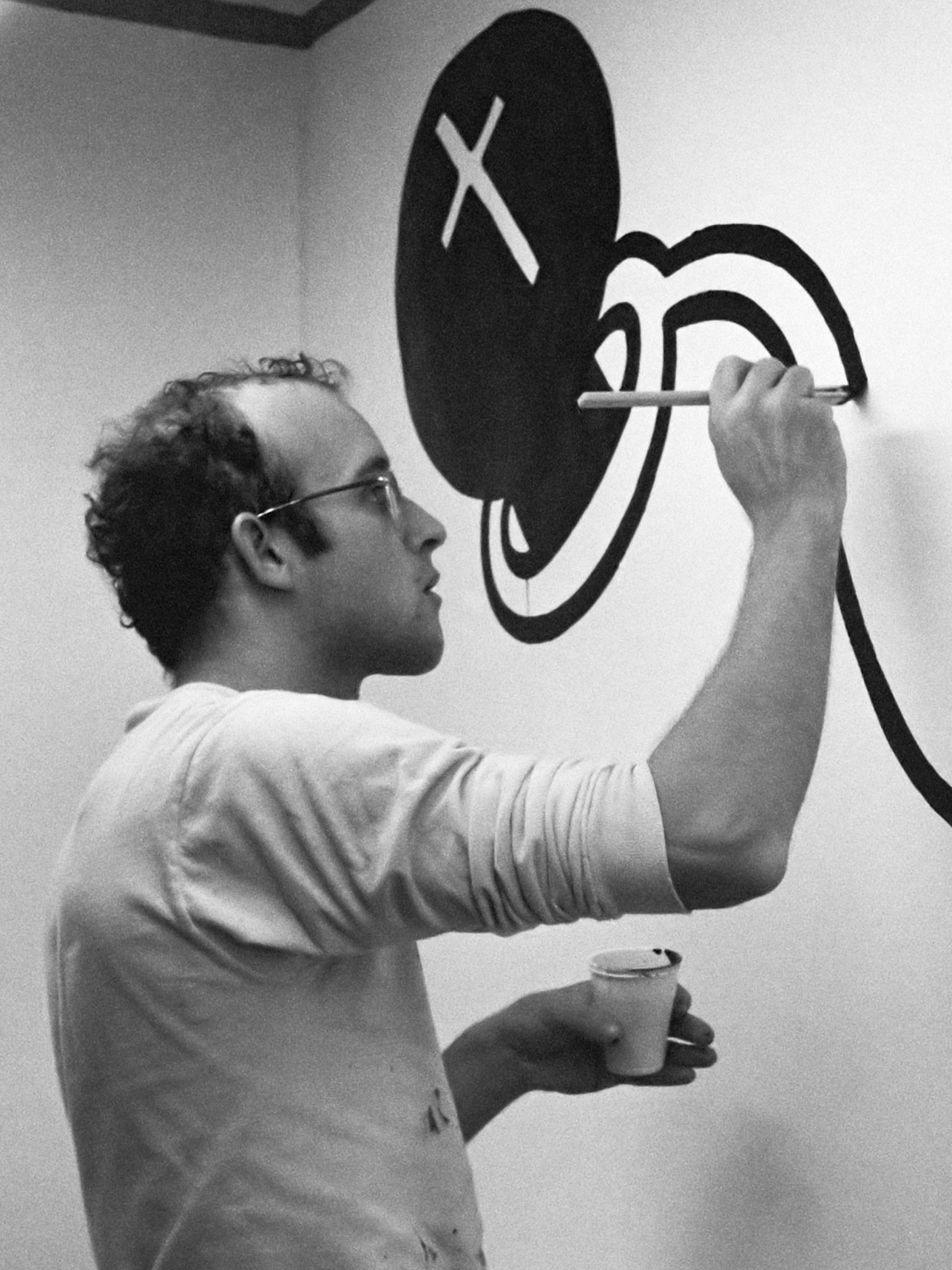
Haring painting a mural at the Stedelijk Museum in Amsterdam, Netherlands, 1986

In 1984, Haring released a book titled Art in Transit, which featured photography of his subway drawings by Tseng Kwong Chi and an introduction by Henry Geldzahler. The New York City Department of Sanitation asked him to design a logo for their anti-litter campaign. Haring was invited to create temporary murals at the National Gallery of Victoria and the Art Gallery of New South Wales. During his visit to Australia, he painted the permanent Keith Haring Mural at Collingwood Technical College in Melbourne. He participated in the 41st Venice Biennale, producing some of his first works with acrylic paint on a stretched muslin. That year, Haring also painted murals at the Walker Art Center in Minneapolis and the village of Serra Grande in Bahia, Brazil. Late in the year, he designed the stage set for the production of Bill T. Jones and Arnie Zane's Secret Pastures at the Brooklyn Academy of Music.

In 1985, Swatch introduced a line of watches designed by Haring. Haring was commissioned by the United Nations to create a first day cover of the United Nations stamp and an accompanying limited edition lithograph to commemorate 1985 as International Youth Year. In March 1985, Haring painted the walls of the Grande Halle de la Villette for the Biennale de Paris. He designed MTV set decorations and painted murals for nightclubs, such as the Palladium and Area in Manhattan.

In July 1985, Haring made a painting for the Live Aid concert at J.F.K. Stadium in Philadelphia. He also painted a car owned by art dealer Max Protetch to be auctioned, with proceeds donated to African famine relief. Haring continued to be politically active as well by designing Free South Africa posters in 1985, and creating a poster for the 1986 Great Peace March for Global Nuclear Disarmament.

In December 1985, Haring painted The Ten Commandments to commemorate his first solo museum show at the CAPC musée d'art contemporain in Bordeaux. Haring had a solo museum exhibition at the Stedelijk Museum in Amsterdam, and he painted a mural on the façade of the museum's storage building in March 1986.

In April 1986, Pop Shop opened in SoHo, selling shirts, posters, and other items showcasing Haring's work. This made Haring's work readily accessible to purchase at reasonable prices. Having achieved what he wanted, which was "getting the work out to the public at large," Haring completely stopped drawing in the subways. He also stopped because people were taking the subway drawings and selling them.

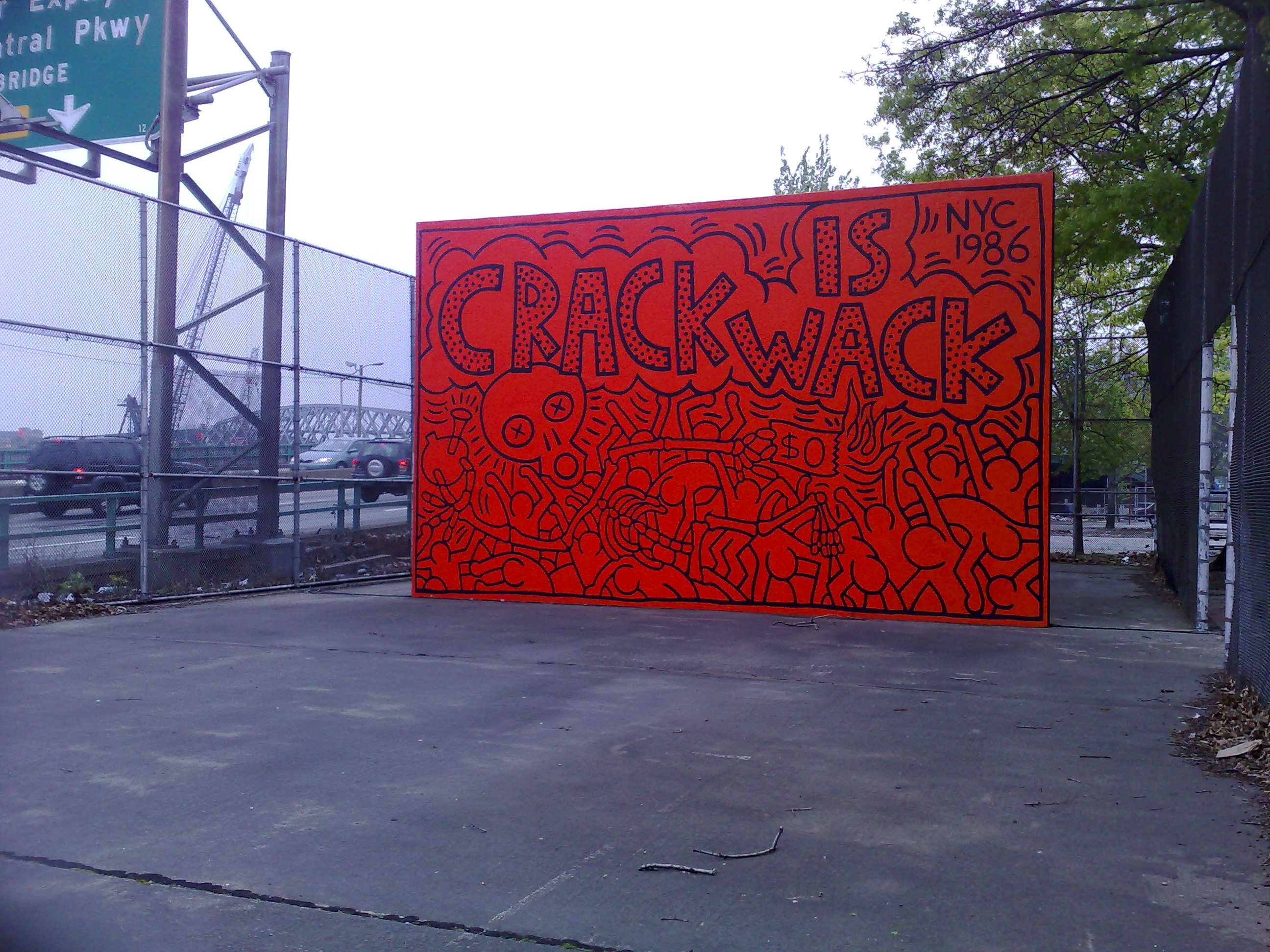
Crack Is Wack (1986) mural on FDR Drive in East Harlem, New York

In June 1986, Haring created a 90-foot (27-metre) banner, CityKids Speak on Liberty, in conjunction with The CityKids Foundation to commemorate the centennial anniversary of the Statue of Liberty's arrival in the United States. Later that month, he created his Crack Is Wack mural in East Harlem, visible from New York's FDR Drive. It was originally considered as vandalism by the New York Police Department and Haring was arrested. But after local media outlets picked up the story, Haring was released on a lesser charge. While he was in jail, Haring's original work was vandalized to read "Crack Is It", then was overpainted by the Parks Department. This mural is an example of Haring's use of consciousness raising rather than consumerism, "Crack is Wack" rather than "Coke is it." He painted an updated version of the mural on the same wall in October 1986.

In September 1986, Haring's permanent murals were unveiled at Woodhull Hospital in Brooklyn. The next month, he created a mural on the Berlin Wall for the Checkpoint Charlie Museum on October 23, 1986. The mural was 300 meters (980 ft) long and depicted red and black interlocking human figures against a yellow background. The colors were a representation of the German flag and symbolized the hope of unity between East and West Germany.

Haring painted a skirt for Grace Jones to wear in her music video "I'm Not Perfect (But I'm Perfect for You)" (1986) and he was the assistant director for the video. He also body painted Jones for live performances at the Paradise Garage, and for her role of Katrina the Queen of The Vampires in the 1986 film Vamp. Haring collaborated with David Spada, a jewelry designer, to design the sculptural adornments for Jones.

Haring collaborated with Warhol to design the poster for the 1986 Montreux Jazz Festival in Switzerland. The poster was also used for the 1986 Montreux-Detroit Jazz Festival in Detroit. He also designed a poster for Absolut Vodka, which was unveiled at the Whitney Museum in New York in October 1986. In December 1986, while in Phoenix to meet with potential backers for a Haring-designed public playground, he led a drawing workshop at the Phoenix Art Museum, gave a lecture, and painted a mural with students downtown.

=== Final years and death: 1987–1990 ===
Haring was openly gay and used his work to advocate for safe sex. He was diagnosed with HIV in 1987 and AIDS in the autumn of 1988. He used his imagery during the last years of his life to speak about his illness and to generate activism and awareness about AIDS.

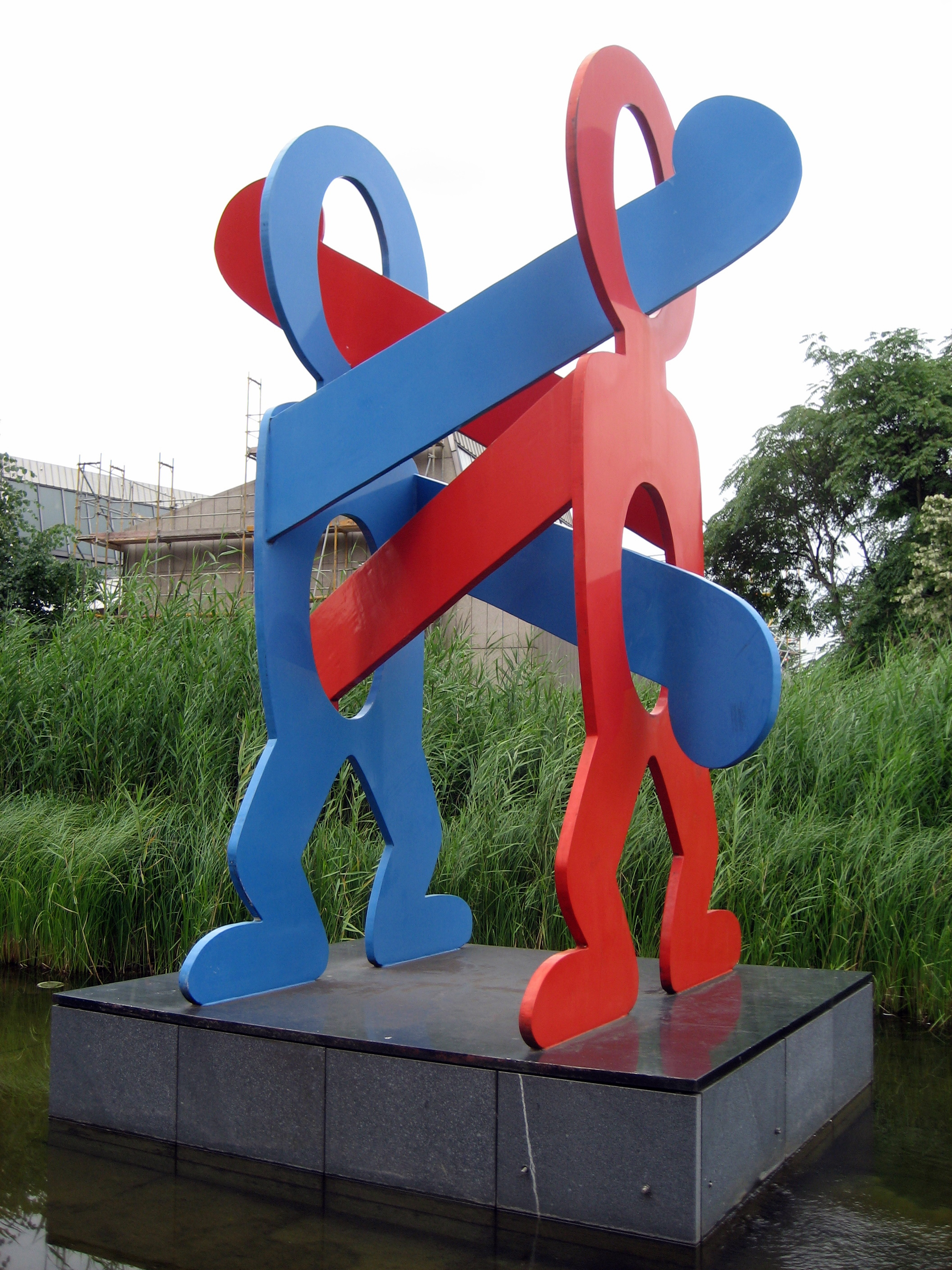
The Boxers (1987) sculpture in Berlin

In 1987, Haring had exhibitions in Helsinki, Paris, and elsewhere. During his stay in Paris for the 10th anniversary exhibition of American artists at the Centre Georges Pompidou, Haring and his boyfriend Juan Rivera painted the Tower mural on an 88-foot-high (27 m) exterior stairwell at the Necker-Enfants Malades Hospital. While in Belgium for his exhibition at Gallery 121, Haring painted a mural at the Museum of Contemporary Art, Antwerp.

That same year, Haring was also invited by artist Roger Nellens to paint a mural at his Casino Knokke. While working there, Haring stayed in Le Dragon, a monster-shaped guest house owned by Nellens which had been designed by artist Niki de Saint Phalle. With the consent of both the designer and the owner, Haring painted a fresco mural along an interior balcony and stairway.

Haring designed a carousel for André Heller's Luna Luna, an ephemeral amusement park in Hamburg from June to August 1987 with rides designed by renowned contemporary artists. In August 1987, Haring painted a large mural at the Carmine Street Recreation Center's outdoor pool in the West Village. In September 1987, he painted a temporary mural, Detroit Notes, at the Cranbrook Art Museum in Bloomfield Hills, Michigan. The work reveals a darker phase in Haring's style, which Cranbrook Art Museum Director Andrew Blauvelt speculates foreshadowed the confirmation of his AIDS diagnosis.

Haring designed the cover for the 1987 benefit album A Very Special Christmas and the Run-DMC single "Christmas In Hollis"; proceeds went to the Special Olympics. The image for the A Very Special Christmas compilation album consists of a typical Haring figure holding a baby. Its "Jesus iconography" is considered unusual in modern rock holiday albums.

Also in 1987, Haring painted a mural in the Philadelphia neighborhood of Point Breeze titled 'We the Youth' to commemorate the bicentennial of the United States Constitution. Originally intended as a placeholder, a new rowhouse was never built and the lot became a park. The mural underwent a major restoration in 2013 and is Haring's longest standing public mural at its original location.

In 1988, Haring joined a select group of artists whose work has appeared on the label of Chateau Mouton Rothschild wine. In January 1988, he traveled to Japan to open Pop Shop Tokyo; it closed in the summer of 1988. Haring collaborated with his friend Stephen Sprouse on designing prints for his Fall 1988 collection. Haring also painted Sprouse's Honda CBR1000F.

In April 1988, Haring created a mural on the South Lawn for the annual White House Easter Egg Roll, which he donated to Children's National Hospital in Washington, D.C. Late in the summer, Haring traveled to Düsseldorf for a show of his paintings and sculptures at the Hans Mayer Gallery. In December 1988, Haring's exhibition opened at the Tony Shafrazi Gallery, which he stated was his most important show to date. He felt he had something to prove because of his health condition and the deaths of his friends Andy Warhol and Jean-Michel Basquiat.

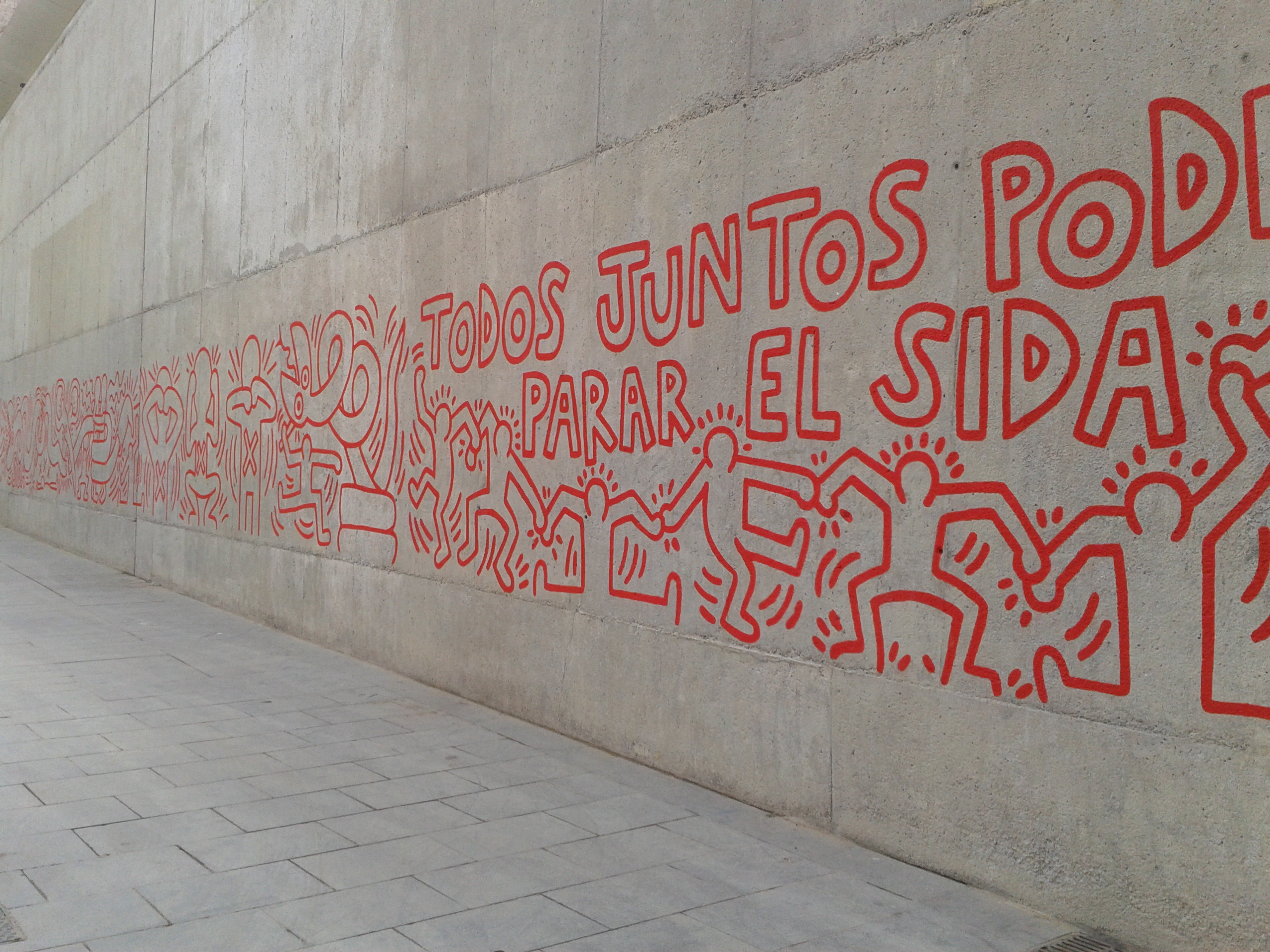
Todos Juntos Podemos Parar el SIDA (1989) in Barcelona, Spain

In February 1989, Haring painted the Todos Juntos Podemos Parar el SIDA mural in the Barrio Chino neighborhood of Barcelona to raise awareness of the AIDS epidemic. In May 1989, at the invitation of a teacher named Irving Zucker, Haring visited Chicago to paint a 480-foot mural in Grant Park along with nearly 500 students. Three other Haring murals materialized in Chicago around the same time: two at Rush University Medical Center, the other at Wells Community Academy High School. The latter was completed days before Haring's arrival in Chicago, as a sort of welcome. According to Zucker, Haring sent the school a design template for the mural, which was executed by a fellow teacher, Tony Abboreno, an abstract artist, and Wells High School art students, but Haring gave it his final approval and signed it himself.

For The Center Show, an exhibition celebrating the 20th anniversary of the Stonewall Riots, Haring was invited by the Lesbian and Gay Community Services Center in New York to create a site-specific work. He chose the second-floor men's bathroom to paint his Once Upon a Time... mural in May 1989. In June 1989, Haring painted his Tuttomondo mural on the rear wall of the convent of the Sant'Antonio Abate church in Pisa. Haring criticized the avoidance of social issues such as AIDS through a piece called Rebel with Many Causes (1989) that revolves around the theme of "hear no evil, see no evil, speak no evil".

Haring revealed that he had AIDS in an interview with David Sheff published in the August 10, 1989, issue of Rolling Stone. Following the disclosure, demand for his work increased, with one spokesperson describing those seeking to profit from his illness as "ambulance chasers." Haring continued to paint while undergoing treatment with azidothymidine (AZT).

During the last week of November 1989, Haring painted a mural at the ArtCenter College of Design in Pasadena for "A Day Without Art." He commemorated the mural on December 1, World AIDS Day, and told the Los Angeles Times: "My life is my art, it's intertwined. When AIDS became a reality in terms of my life, it started becoming a subject in my paintings. The more it affected my life the more it affected my work." From Pasadena, Haring flew to Atlanta for the opening of his dual show with photographer Herb Ritts at the Fay Gold Gallery on December 2.

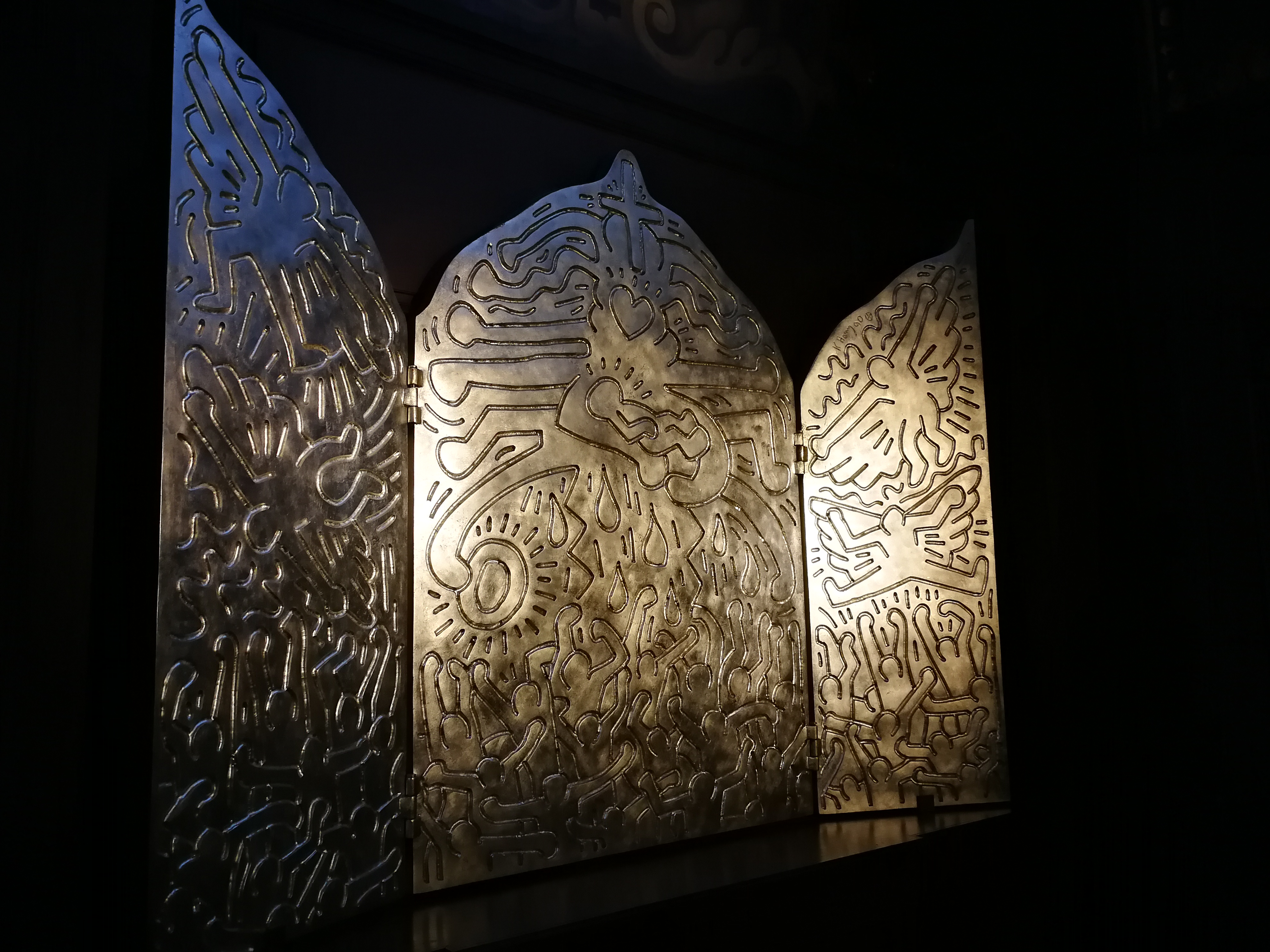
La vie du Christ (1990) at Saint-Eustache Church in Paris

In 1990, Haring painted a BMW Z1 at the Hans Mayer Gallery in Düsseldorf. He traveled to Paris for what would be his last exhibition, Keith Haring 1983, at Galerie 1900–2000/La Galerie de Poche in January 1990.

Just two weeks before his death, Haring completed The Life of Christ, a triptych carved in clay and cast in nine bronze editions, each finished with a white-gold patina. There are nine versions of the triptych in total: one is installed in the Saint-Eustache Church in Paris. Another at the Cathedral of St. John the Divine in Manhattan. Yet another is in Grace Cathedral in San Francisco.

On February 16, 1990, Haring died of AIDS-related complications at his LaGuardia Place apartment in Greenwich Village. He was cremated and his ashes were scattered in a field near Bowers, Pennsylvania, just south of his hometown of Kutztown.

On May 4, 1990, which would have been Haring's 32nd birthday, a memorial service was held at the Cathedral of St. John the Divine in Manhattan. Speakers included Mayor David N. Dinkins, actor Dennis Hopper, soprano Jessye Norman, ballet dancers Heather Watts and Jock Soto, and former Parks Commissioner Henry Stern. "He was a man whose short life was a mission of life and hope," said Dinkins, for whom Haring had designed campaign materials. "Rarely has a person in his position given so much of himself to other human beings… his whirlwind philanthropy stands out even in a city known for philanthropy."

== Works ==
=== Commercial art ===
Keith Haring worked extensively as a commercial artist, producing designs for album covers, fashion, and mass-produced objects alongside his gallery practice. He illustrated record sleeves for musicians including David Bowie ("Without You", 1983), N.Y.C. Peech Boys (Life Is Something Special, 1983), Malcolm McLaren ("Duck Rock", 1983), and Sylvester ("Someone Like You", 1986). His commercial output also included silkscreened T-shirts, textile designs, and the Pop Shop, reflecting his interest in making art accessible to a broad audience.

Despite his success, Haring's commercial activities drew criticism in the media. People magazine described him as a "trendy" painter, while Time accused him of "filching" ideas for his "overpromoted faddish" work. Haring rejected these claims, pointing to his established gallery representation and museum exhibitions as evidence of the seriousness of his practice. He maintained that his work operated across multiple contexts, stating, "None is more important than the other… You can't separate the three."

Responding to suggestions that his style was derived from A. R. Penck, Haring instead cited influences including Stuart Davis, Henri Matisse, Andy Warhol, and Pierre Alechinsky. He also emphasized the role of popular culture in shaping his work, noting, "I grew up in the American pop culture, the television cartoon and graffiti cultures."

When Haring opened his Pop Shop in 1986, some accused him of commodifying his work. He rejected this view, arguing, "I could earn more money if I just painted a few things and jacked up the price. My shop is an extension of what I was doing in the subway stations, breaking down the barriers between high and low art." His retail space, the Pop Shop, extended this philosophy; it remained open after his death until 2005, with proceeds benefiting the Keith Haring Foundation.

The Pop Shop was part of a broader effort to make his art widely accessible. "For the past five or six years, the rewards I've gotten are very disproportionate to what I deserve...I make a lot more money than what I should make, so it's a little bit of guilt, of wanting to give it back," Haring said in 1989.

Throughout his career, Haring created works in subway stations and on billboards, and developed a visual language of simplified, anonymous figures without fixed age, race, or identity. By the mid-1980s, his work increasingly addressed socio-political themes, including anti-Apartheid, AIDS awareness, and the crack cocaine epidemic.

=== Social activism ===
Haring's work was closely tied to his commitment to social and political activism, which became a defining aspect of his career throughout the 1980s. He used his public visibility and distinctive graphic style to address issues including the crack epidemic, LGBTQ rights, and the growing HIV/AIDS crisis. He created works promoting literacy and youth engagement in collaboration with public schools and community organizations.

Haring was an outspoken critic of apartheid, most notably creating the poster Free South Africa (1985), which became widely reproduced symbols of protest.

He also produced works supporting nuclear disarmament. An example of this is a black and white striped flag that he said symbolized the danger of a nuclear apocalypse. In some of his art he drew connections between the end of the world and the AIDS virus. In a piece that he made with William Burroughs, he depicts the virus as demon-like creatures, the number 666, and a mushroom cloud.

As a gay artist who was diagnosed with AIDS in 1988, Haring became an important public advocate for AIDS awareness and education. In 1989, he established the Keith Haring Foundation to provide funding to AIDS organizations and children's programs, as well as to maintain and distribute his artwork.

During the final year of his life, he intensified his activism, participating in campaigns such as ACT UP initiatives and creating imagery used by advocacy groups to destigmatize the disease. His work Silence=Death, which mirrors the ACT UP poster and uses its motto, is almost universally agreed upon as a work of HIV/AIDS activism. In 1989, Haring designed T-shirts to commemorate the 20th anniversary of the Stonewall riots.

Three months after his death, Haring posthumously appeared in Rosa von Praunheim's documentary film Silence = Death (1990) about gay artists in New York City fighting for the rights of people with AIDS.

=== Exhibitions ===
From 1982 to 1989, Haring was featured in more than 100 solo and group exhibitions and produced more than 50 public artworks for charities, hospitals, day care centers, and orphanages. He was represented by well-known galleries such as the Tony Shafrazi Gallery and the Leo Castelli Gallery. Since his death, has been featured in over 150 exhibitions around the world. He has also been the subject of several international retrospectives.

Haring had his first solo exhibition at Westbeth Painters Space in February 1981. That month he also participated in New York/New Wave exhibit at MoMA PS1. Later that year, he had a solo exhibition in the Hal Bromm Gallery in Tribeca, followed by his breakthrough exhibition at the Tony Shafrazi Gallery in SoHo in 1982. In 1982, he took part in documenta 7 in Kassel as well as Public Art Fund's Messages to the Public series in which he created work for a Spectacolor billboard in Times Square. In 1983, Haring contributed work to the Whitney Biennial and the São Paulo Biennial. He also had solo exhibitions at the Fun Gallery in the East Village, Galerie Watari in Tokyo, Institute of Contemporary Art, Philadelphia, the Wadsworth Atheneum in Hartford, and his second show the Tony Shafrazi Gallery.

In 1984, Haring participated in the group show Arte di Frontiera: New York Graffiti in Italy. He participated in the Venice Biennale in 1984 and 1986. In 1985, Haring took part in the Paris Biennial and he had his first solo museum exhibition at the CAPC musée d'art contemporain in Bordeaux. In 1986, three of Haring's sculptures were placed at Dag Hammarskjöld Plaza outside the United Nations headquarters. Two of the works were displayed at Riverside Park from May 1988 to May 1989. In 1991–92, Haring's Figure Balancing on Dog was displayed in Dante Park in Manhattan.

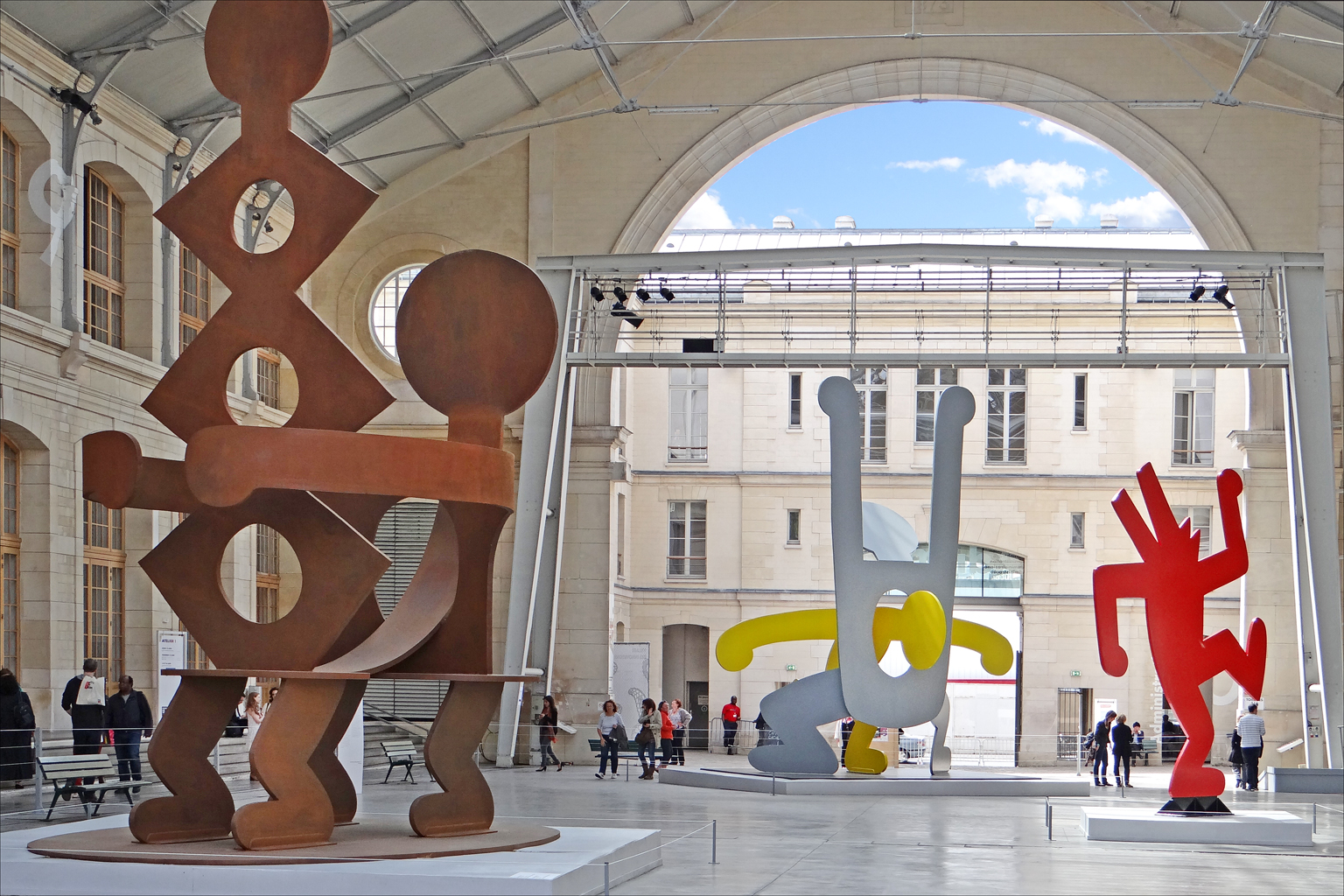
Sculptures made by Haring displayed at Cent Quatre in Paris, 2013

In 1996, a retrospective at the Museum of Contemporary Art Australia was the first major exhibition of his work in Australia. His art was the subject of a 1997 retrospective at the Whitney Museum of American Art in New York, curated by Elisabeth Sussman. The Public Art Fund, in collaboration with the Estate of Keith Haring, organized a multi-site installation of his outdoor sculptures at Central Park's Doris C. Freedman Plaza and along the Park Avenue Malls. This public exhibition occurred simultaneously with the retrospective at the Whitney. The sculptures later traveled to the West Coast in 1998. The San Francisco Arts Commission displayed 10 sculptures around San Francisco to coincide with Haring's retrospective at the San Francisco Museum of Modern Art. The city of West Hollywood and Haring's estate also presented his sculptures on Santa Monica Boulevard.

In 2007, Haring's painted aluminum sculpture Self-Portrait (1989) was displayed in the lobby of the Arsenal in Central Park, as part of the retrospective exhibition The Outdoor Gallery: 40 Years of Public Art in New York City Parks.

In 2008, there was a retrospective exhibition at the MAC in Lyon, France. In February 2010, on the occasion of the 20th anniversary of the Haring's death, the Tony Shafrazi Gallery showed an exhibition containing dozens of works from every stage of Haring's career. In March 2012, a retrospective exhibit of his work, Keith Haring: 1978–1982, opened at the Brooklyn Museum in New York. In April 2013, the retrospective Keith Haring: The Political Line opened at the Musée d'Art Moderne de la Ville de Paris and Le Cent Quatre. In November 2014, then at the De Young Museum in San Francisco.

From December 2016 to June 2017, the Petersen Automotive Museum in Los Angeles exhibited The Unconventional Canvases of Keith Haring, which featured five vehicles that Haring painted. In 2019, Haring's work was exhibited at Gladstone Gallery in Belgium and the New York Law School in Manhattan. The first major UK exhibition of Haring's work, featuring more than 85 artworks, was at Tate Liverpool from June to November 2019. From December 2019 to March 2020, the National Gallery of Victoria in Melbourne exhibited Keith Haring and Jean-Michel Basquiat: Crossing Lines.

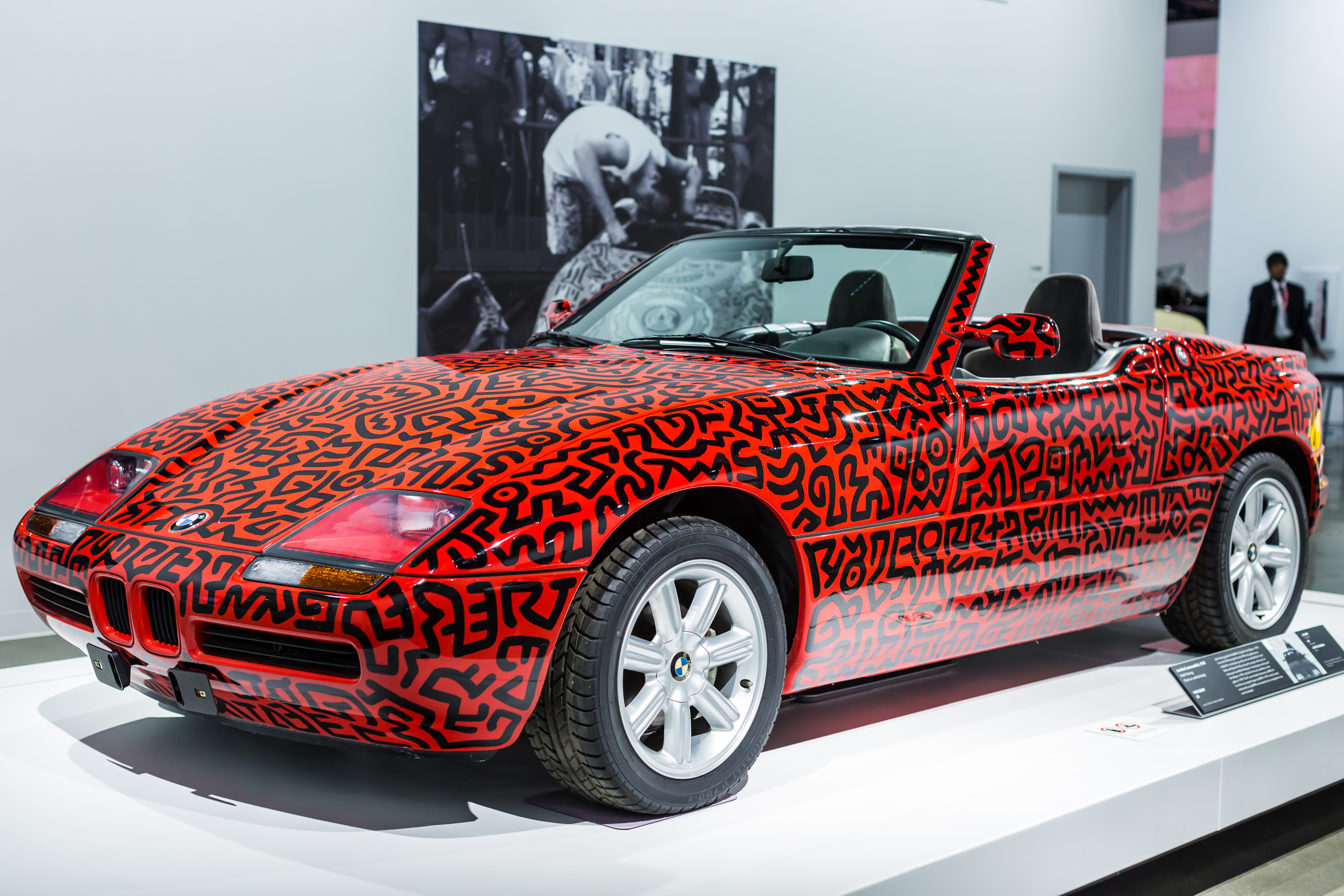
A BMW Z1 painted by Haring in 1990, on display at the Petersen Automotive Museum in 2017

In 2021, the Museum of Contemporary Art Denver displayed the exhibition Keith Haring: Grace House Mural, which consisted of 13 panels from a mural Haring painted at a Catholic youth center on the Upper West Side of Manhattan in either March 1983 or 1984. The mural—which featured Haring's radiant baby, barking dog, and dancing man figures—spanned three floors and 85 feet. When Grace House was sold, its operator, the Church of the Ascension, went against the Keith Haring Foundation's wishes of securing a buyer who would maintain the work. Instead, the church had sections of the mural cut out and sold at auction in 2019 to an anonymous private collector for $3.86 million.

In 2022, the exhibition Keith Haring: Grace House Mural was displayed at the Schunck Museum in Heerlen. In 2023, The Broad presented Haring's first museum exhibition in Los Angeles, Keith Haring: Art is for Everyone.

From March 11 to May 31, 2026, the Brant Foundation exhibited Keith Haring, featuring works created from 1980 to 1983.

From June 6, 2026 to January 25, 2027, the Crystal Bridges Museum of American Art will exhibit Keith Haring in 3D, the first exhibition to highlight Keith Haring’s work in three dimensions.

=== Art market ===
A CBS Evening News report in October 1982 noted that more than a quarter of a million dollars' worth of Haring’s work sold within the first days of his exhibition at the Tony Shafrazi Gallery. Although already an established artist by 1983, Haring—according to dealer Tony Shafrazi—chose to keep prices relatively accessible, ranging from approximately $3,000 for drawings to $15,000 for large paintings. By 1984, his works were selling for up to $20,000, and he was earning an estimated annual income of $250,000. Haring was represented by Shafrazi throughout his career until his death in 1990. Since then, his estate has been managed by the Keith Haring Foundation, which works in partnership with Gladstone Gallery.

Haring's market has demonstrated sustained strength and long-term growth, with major results spanning several decades. In 2007, a significant Untitled (1982), depicting a trio of spotted dogs jumping through the hollow center of a standing figure, sold for over $2.8 million at Christie's, marking an early benchmark in his secondary market performance. This upward trajectory continued into the 2010s, including a 2014 Sotheby's sale of Untitled (1988), showing colorful interlocking figures, for $3.1 million.

In May 2017, Haring's painting Untitled (1982), which features his signature symbols—the radiant baby, barking dogs, angels and red Xs—sold for $6.5 million at Sotheby's in New York, setting what would have been a record for the artist. However, the winning bidder, Anatole Shagalov, defaulted on payment, and the work was resold in August 2017 for $4.4 million.

In 2018, Haring's Untitled (1984) sold for over $4.8 million at Christie's in London. The painting depicts an early computer elevated on a pyramid-like structure, presented as a modern, almost deified object reflecting technological transformation.

In October 2020, the Keith Haring Foundation partnered with Sotheby's in October 2020 for the online auction Dear Keith, which offered more than 140 works from Haring's collection. The sale achieved a 100 percent sell-through rate, totaling $4.6 million and significantly exceeding its $1.4 million estimate. Proceeds were donated to the Lesbian, Gay, Bisexual & Transgender Community Center in New York City.

In December 2021, Haring's 1982 painting Untitled (Acrobats) from the collection of Peter M. Brant and Stephanie Seymour, sold for $5.5 million at Sotheby's in New York.

=== Collections ===
Haring's work is in major private and public collections, including the Museum of Modern Art, the Morgan Library and Museum, and the Whitney Museum of American Art in New York City; Los Angeles County Museum of Art; the Art Institute of Chicago; the Bass Museum in Miami; Musée d'Art Moderne de la Ville de Paris; the Brant Foundation Art Study Center in Greenwich, Connecticut; the Carnegie Museum of Art and the Andy Warhol Museum in Pittsburgh; the Ludwig Museum in Cologne; and the Stedelijk Museum in Amsterdam. He also created a wide variety of public works, including the infirmary at Children's Village in Dobbs Ferry, New York, and the second floor men's room in the Lesbian, Gay, Bisexual & Transgender Community Center in Manhattan, which was later transformed into an office and is known as the Keith Haring Room.

The Nakamura Keith Haring Collection, established in 2007 in Hokuto, Yamanashi, Japan, is an art museum exhibiting exclusively the artworks of Haring.

=== Authentication issues ===
There is no catalogue raisonné for Haring, but there is copious information about him on the estate's website and elsewhere, enabling prospective buyers or sellers to research exhibition history. Whilst no formal catalogue raisonné exists for Haring's works "Keith Haring 1982–1990: Editions on Paper – the Complete Printed Works" by Klaus Littmann is widely considered to be the most authoritative guide on the subject of his printed editions.

In 2012, the Keith Haring Foundation disbanded its authentication board to focus on its charitable activities. That same year, it donated $1 million to support exhibitions at the Whitney Museum of American Art. In 2014, a group of nine art collectors sued the foundation, claiming that it has cost them at least $40 million by refusing to authenticate 80 purported Haring works. In 2015, a judge ruled in favor of the foundation.

== Personal life ==
=== Relationships ===
Haring had many casual male lovers, but he had two significant romantic relationships. Haring told his biographer John Gruen: "It's probably one of my major faults that I pursue physical love with such obsession. It was always the first and foremost aspect that I took care of. I always felt that intellectual stimulation and companionship could be supplied by other people."

Haring dated DJ Juan Dubose from 1981 to 1986. They met at the New St. Marks Baths in the East Village. Dubose moved in with Haring and his roommate Samantha McEwen in an apartment on Broome Street. Dubose would play at Haring's art openings and parties, and Haring worked to mixtapes made by him. By 1985, Haring began to travel more and lost interest in Dubose. "I was certainly unfaithful to Juan. … The fact is, I was bored with Juan's inability to do anything with himself. And I didn't like Juan's involvement with drugs, which was partly spurred by my rejection of him," he said. After Dubose died from AIDS in 1989, Haring helped his family arrange his funeral.

Haring dated Juan Rivera from 1986 to 1989. Haring wanted to be a bachelor until he met Rivera at Paradise Garage in New York City. Rivera worked in construction as a carpenter and he was a limousine driver. Rivera moved into Haring's studio until he finally broke up with Dubose and then they moved into a new apartment together. Rivera was Haring's travel companion and he assisted him with the murals Crack is Wack (1986) in New York and Tower (1987) in Paris. When Haring told Rivera he had AIDS, he got tested and found out he had AIDS-related complex (ARC). Haring began to grow irritable and distanced himself from Rivera, spending more time with his friend Gil Vazquez. After learning that Haring had brought Vazquez to Europe instead of him, Rivera surprised them at the airport upon their return and broke up with Haring. Shortly before Haring died in 1990, he called Rivera and spent three days with him. Rivera later developed AIDS and died from ALS in 2011. The book Queer Latino Testimonio, Keith Haring and Juanito Xtravaganza: Hard Tails (2007) by Arnaldo Cruz-Malavé details their relationship.

=== Friendships ===
Soon after moving to New York to study at the School of Visual Arts, he became friends with classmates Kenny Scharf (his one-time roommate), Samantha McEwen, and John Sex. Eventually, he befriended Jean-Michel Basquiat, who would write his SAMO graffiti around the campus. When Basquiat died in 1988, Haring wrote his obituary for Vogue magazine, and he paid homage to him with the painting A Pile of Crowns for Jean-Michel Basquiat (1988).

In 1979, Haring met photographer Tseng Kwong Chi in the East Village. The two became close friends, and Tseng went on to document much of Haring's work throughout his career. Haring later acknowledged the importance of that relationship, writing in his journal, "Photography has become such an important part of my work since so much of it is temporary. It is, after all, the phenomena of photography and video that have made the international phenomenon of Keith Haring possible."

In 1981, Haring met 14-year-old graffiti artist Angel "LA II" Ortiz, who became his collaborator. Haring later recalled, "We just immediately hit it off. It's as if we'd known each other all our lives. He's like my little brother." Although Ortiz was paid during Haring's lifetime, his contributions were often overlooked by the art establishment. According to Ricardo Montez, author of Keith Haring's Line: Race and the Performance of Desire, both the Keith Haring Foundation and the broader art world have since taken steps to rectify Ortiz's erasure.

By the early 1980s, Haring had established friendships with fellow emerging artists Fab 5 Freddy and Futura 2000, and singer Madonna. In 1982, Haring befriended pop artist Andy Warhol, who became his mentor and the inspiration for his 1986 Andy Mouse series. Warhol also created a portrait of Haring and his boyfriend Juan Dubose in 1983. Through Warhol, Haring became friends with Grace Jones, Francesco Clemente, and Yoko Ono. He also formed friendships with George Condo, Jean-Charles de Castelbajac, and Claude Picasso.

Haring met accessories designer Bobby Breslau in the early 1980s. He looked to Breslau for guidance and called him his "Jewish mother". Breslau introduced Haring to his friend Larry Levan, resident DJ at the Paradise Garage. Breslau inspired Haring to work with leather hides and he was the manager of the Pop Shop until his death in 1987.

Art dealer Yves Arman was Haring's close friend, and Haring was the godfather of his daughter. Haring said Arman was "probably the best supporter I had in the art world." In 1989, Arman was killed in a car accident on his way to see Haring in Spain.

In 1988, Gil Vazquez was invited by a friend to visit Haring's Broadway studio. Haring and Vazquez became close friends and spent a great deal of time together. Haring described their platonic relationship as "intellectual companionship." I really enjoy being his friend and sharing and caring like a big brother more than a lover," he said. Before his death, Haring set up a foundation bearing his name. He appointed his assistant and studio manager Julia Gruen to be the executive director; she began working for him in 1984. Vazquez was a founding board member for the Keith Haring Foundation for 35 years and the executive director from 2019 to 2025.

=== Religion ===
Haring was deeply influenced by the Jesus Movement as a youth, and it continued to play a role in his art for his entire career. The movement was an extremely evangelical, loosely organized, diverse group of Christians. They were known for their anti-materialism and anti-establishment beliefs, focus on the Last Judgment, and their compassionate treatment of the poor. As a young teenager, Haring became very involved in the movement. Religious symbols started to be incorporated into his drawings around that age as well as Jesus Movement sentiments. This includes anti-church establishment views that can be seen in some of his later work. Though his time as a "Jesus Person" did not last beyond his teenage years, religious images, symbols, and references continued to appear in his art. In an interview near the end of his life he commented, "[All] that stuff stuck in my head and even now there are lots of religious images in my work. Some people even think my work is by a religious fanatic or maniac."

When Haring was drawing graffiti in the subway, he used a tag to sign his work. His tag, the Radiant Baby, depicts a baby with lines radiating from it, alluding to the Christ Child. He continued to make images depicting the Christ Child, including Nativity scenes in his characteristic style during his time as a subway artist. His last pieces were two religious triptychs; both went to Episcopal cathedrals. In them he illustrates the Last Judgment, though who is being saved in the pieces is ambiguous.

== Legacy ==
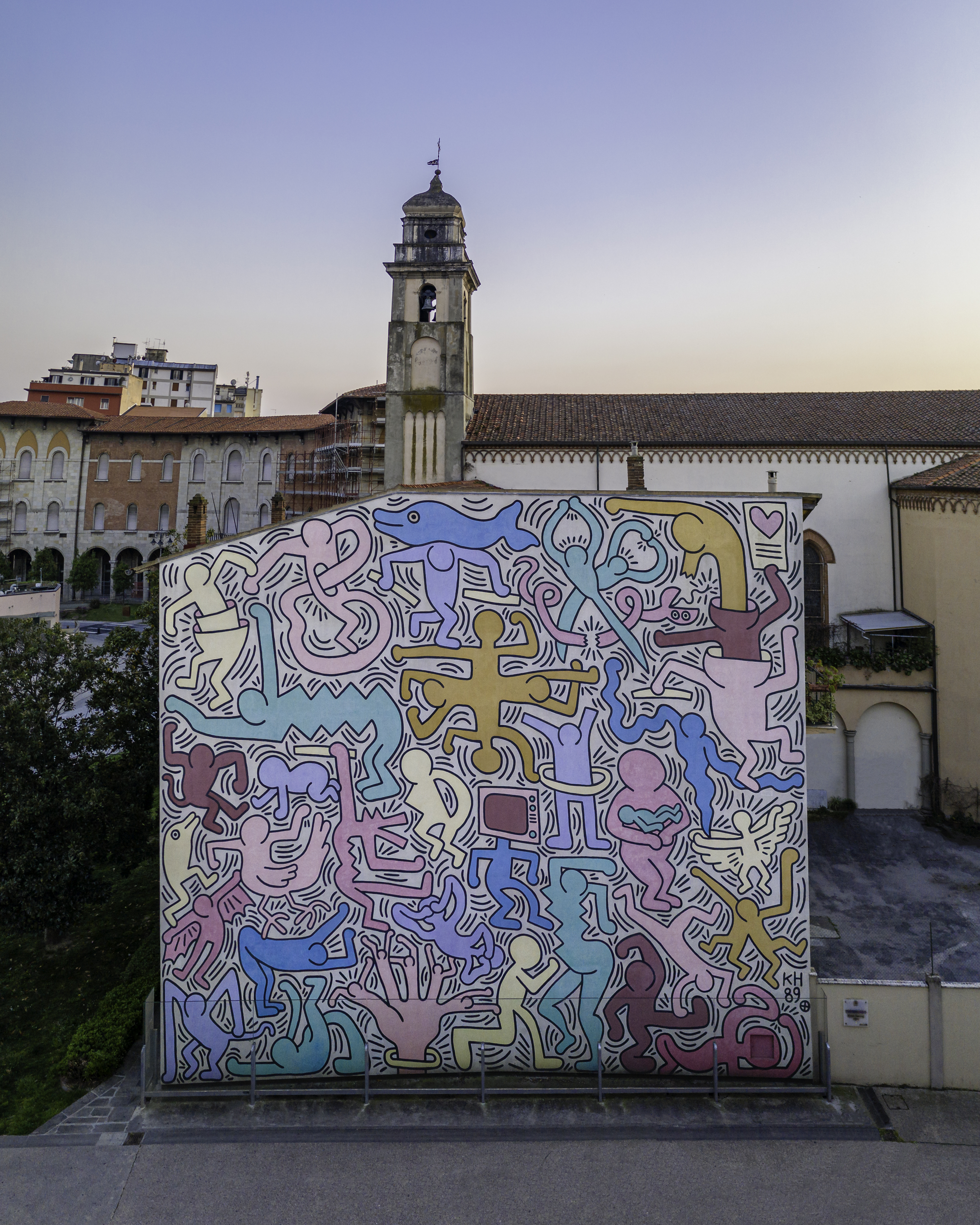
Tuttomondo (1989) mural at the church of Sant'Antonio Abate in Pisa, Italy

=== The Keith Haring Foundation ===
In 1989, Haring established the Keith Haring Foundation to provide funding and imagery to AIDS organizations and children's programs. The foundation's stated goal is to keep his wishes and expand his legacy by providing grants and funding to non-profit organizations that educate disadvantaged youths and inform the public about HIV and AIDS. It also shares his work and contains information about his life. The foundation also supports arts and educational institutions by funding exhibitions, educational programs, and publications. In 2010, the foundation partnered with the AIDS Service Center NYC to open the Keith Haring ASC Harlem Center to provide HIV peer education and access to care services in Harlem.

=== Accolades and tributes ===
As a celebration of his life, Madonna declared that the final American date of her 1990 Blond Ambition World Tour would be a benefit concert for Haring's memory. More than $300,000 was made from ticket sales, which was donated to the Foundation for AIDS Research. The act was documented in the 1991 film Madonna: Truth or Dare.

Haring's work was featured in several of Red Hot Organization's efforts to raise money for AIDS and AIDS awareness, specifically its first two albums, Red Hot + Blue (1990) and Red Hot + Dance (1992), the latter of which used Haring's work on its cover. His art remains on display worldwide.

In 1991, Haring was commemorated on the AIDS Memorial Quilt with his famous baby icon on a fabric panel. The baby was embroidered by Haring's aunt, Jeannette Ebling, and Haring's mother, Joan Haring, did much of the sewing.

Tim Finn wrote the song "Hit The Ground Running", on his album Before & After (1993), in memory of Haring.

In 2006, Haring was named by Equality Forum as one of their 31 Icons of LGBT History Month.

In 2008, Haring had a balloon in tribute to him at the Macy's Thanksgiving Day Parade. According to artnet.com, Haring had always dreamed of creating a balloon for the parade. "Eighteen years on from his death, this wish came true on what would have been his 50th birthday. It later fronted the main entrance to Central Park's AIDS Walk in 2014. The balloon is also remembered for crashing into NBC's onsite booth and taking its broadcast temporarily off air." On May 4, 2012, on what would have been Haring's 54th birthday, Google honored him in a Google Doodle.

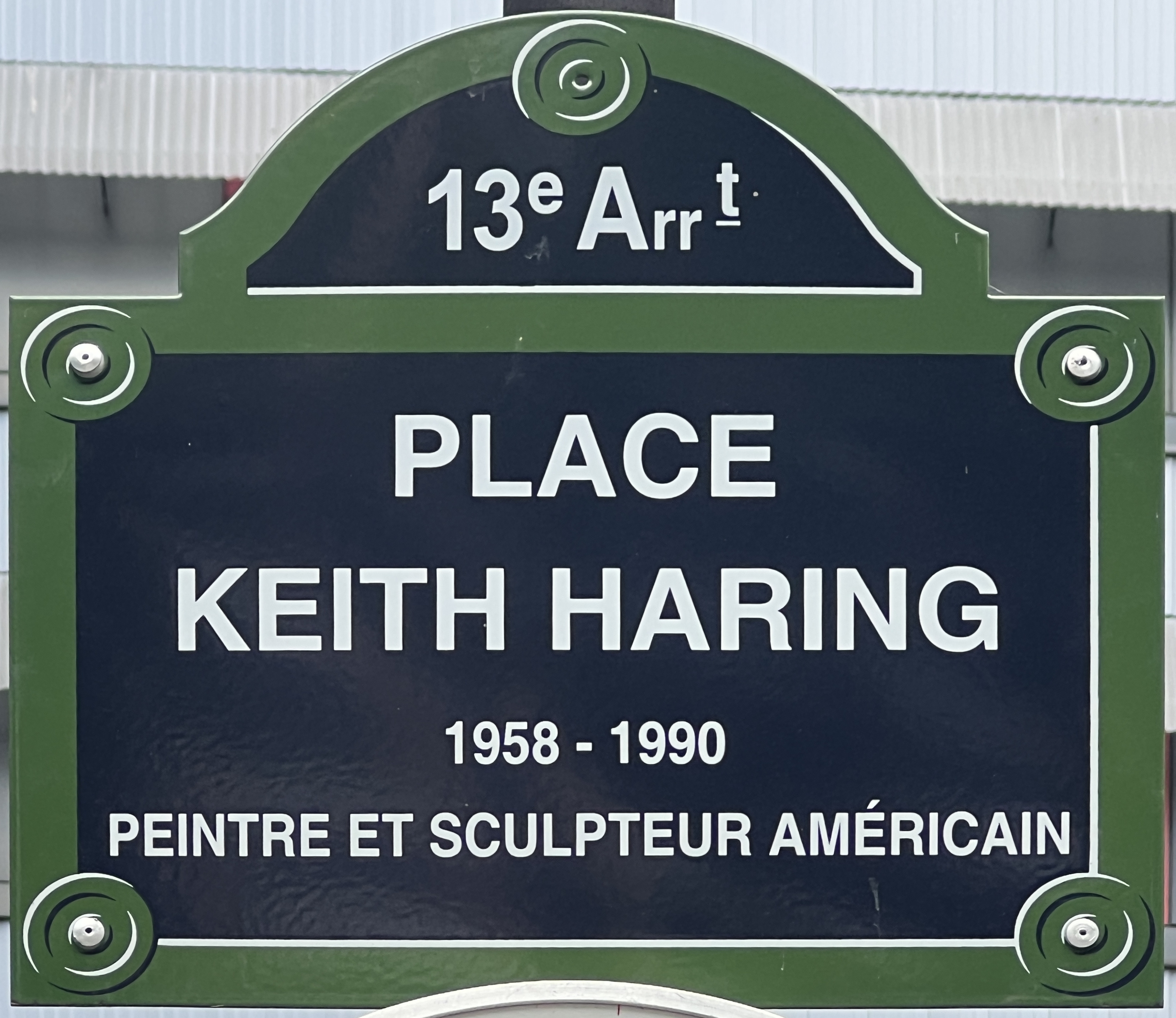
Place Keith Haring in Paris

In 2014, Haring was one of the inaugural honorees in the Rainbow Honor Walk. The Rainbow Honor Walk is a walk of fame in San Francisco's Castro neighborhood noting LGBTQ people who have "made significant contributions in their fields."

In 2018, a public square in the 13th arrondissement of Paris was named Place Keith Haring in his memory.

In June 2019, Haring was one of the inaugural fifty American "pioneers, trailblazers, and heroes" inducted on the National LGBTQ Wall of Honor within the Stonewall National Monument in New York City's Stonewall Inn. Stonewall is the first US national monument dedicated to LGBTQ rights and history, and the wall's unveiling was timed to take place during the 50th anniversary of the Stonewall riots.

In 2021, Polaroid honored Haring with a Polaroid Now camera and Polaroid i-Type instant film decorated with his signature motifs.

In 2024, a historical marker was dedicated to Haring in his hometown of Kutztown, Pennsylvania.

=== In pop culture ===
Haring's signature style is frequently seen in various fashion collections. His estate has collaborated with brands such as Adidas, Lacoste, UNIQLO, Supreme, Reebok, Tenga, and Coach.

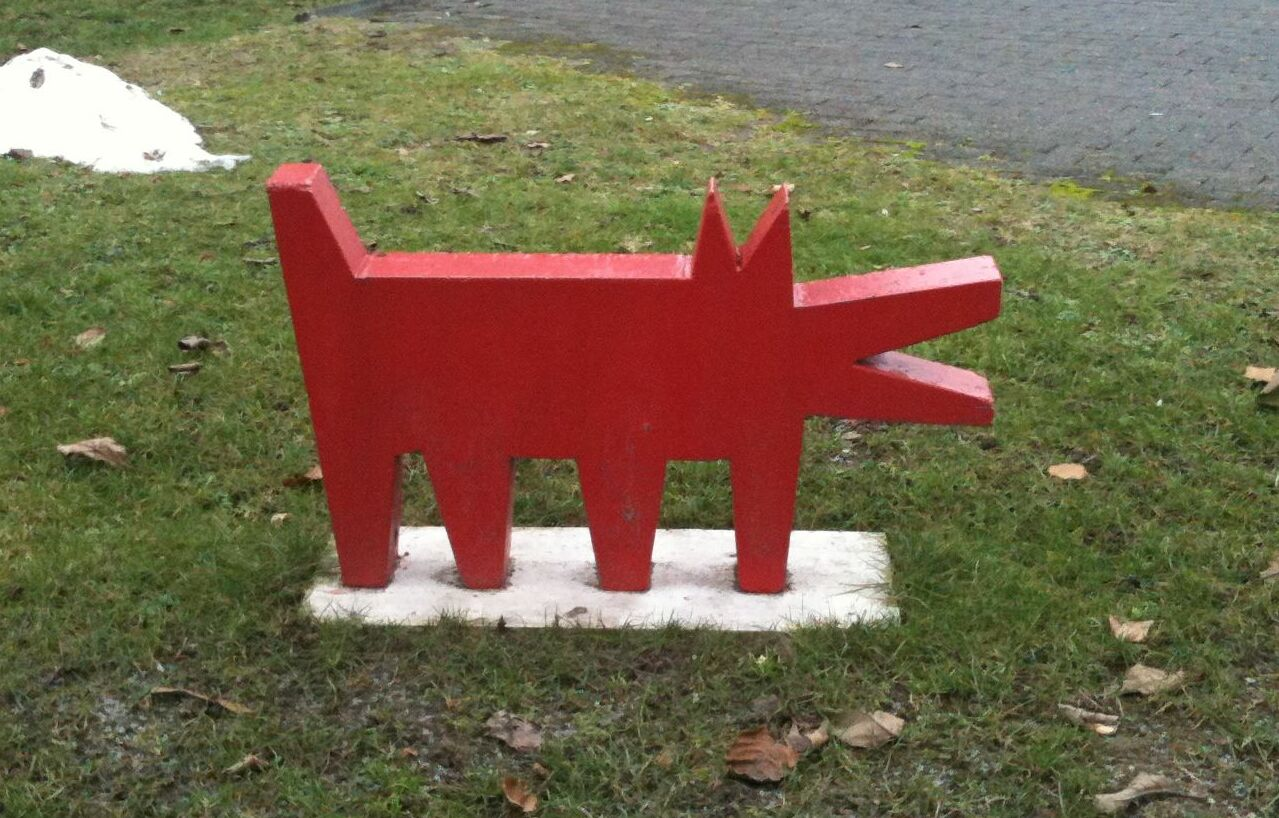
Barking dog sculpture in Dortmund

Haring is the subject of a composition, Haring at the Exhibition, written and performed by Italian composer Lorenzo Ferrero in collaboration with DJ Nicola Guiducci. The work combines excerpts from popular chart music of the 1980s with samples of classical music compositions by Lorenzo Ferrero and synthesized sounds. It was featured at "The Keith Haring Show", an exhibition which took place in 2005 at the Triennale di Milano.

In 2008, filmmaker Christina Clausen released the documentary The Universe of Keith Haring. In the film, Haring's legacy is "resurrected through colorful archival footage and remembered by friends and admirers such as artists Kenny Scharf and Yoko Ono, gallery owners Jeffrey Deitch and Tony Shafrazi, and choreographer Bill T. Jones".

Madonna used Haring's art as animated backdrops for her 2008/2009 Sticky and Sweet Tour. The animation featured his trademark blocky figures dancing in beat to an updated remix of "Into the Groove".

Keith Haring: Double Retrospect is an extremely large jigsaw puzzle by Ravensburger measuring in at 17 by 6 feet (5.2 by 1.8 m) with 32,256 pieces, breaking Guinness Book of World Records for the largest puzzle ever made in 2011. The puzzle uses 32 pieces of his work and weighs 42 pounds (19 kg).

In 2017, his sister Kay Haring wrote a children's book, Keith Haring: The Boy Who Just Kept Drawing, which ranked among the top ten sellers every week for over a year in the Amazon category of Children's Art History.

In July 2020, BBC Two broadcast the documentary Keith Haring: Street Art Boy, which is built from a series of interviews between Haring and art critic John Gruen in 1989. The documentary, which was directed by Ben Anthony, aired in December 2020 on PBS as part of the American Masters series.

In May 2025, Lego released Keith Haring – Dancing Figures, as part of their Lego Art line. The building set, which is designed for adults, features 1,773 pieces that "brilliantly captures the bold lines, vibrant colours and distinctive sense of movement and energy," of Haring's dancing figures.

In August 2025, it was reported that filmmaker Andrew Haigh is developing a TV series based on Brad Gooch's 2024 biography Radiant: The Life and Line of Keith Haring.

== See also ==
- LGBT culture in New York City
- List of LGBT people from New York City
