= Untitled Series (with Sean Kalish) =

1990 series of 11 etchings by Keith Haring with Sean Kalish

- Untitled etching from the series (1989–90)
- Artist: Keith Haring; Sean Kalish
- Year: 1989–90 (drawn); 1990 (printed, published)
- Catalogue: Littmann 155-157
- Medium: 11 Etchings (soft-ground and hard-ground) in black ink on handmade cotton paper
- Subject: Social activism; youth voice; urban art; collaboration; child art; youth-adult partnership; children's rights; innocence; accessibility; social change; adultism; young people
- Dimensions: Plate: 12.5 × 15.5 cm (6 × 5 in.); Sheet: 35.5 × 31.5 cm (14 × 12 1/2 in.)
- Location: ≥2 public collections

Collaborators
- Proofed by: Richard Spare, London
- Editioned by: Richard Spare, London
- Publisher: Keith Haring, New York City
- Website: Untitled at haring.com

Untitled Series (with Sean Kalish) is an untitled and unordered series of eleven untitled etchings, drawn between 1989 and 1990 by Keith Haring in collaboration with Sean Kalish, a 9-year-old patron of the Pop Shop. Also referred to as Untitled (w Sean Kalish) or Untitled, 1989. This was one of the final projects undertaken by Haring, and the last to involve etching, before his death later in 1990.

This anti-adultist artistic collaboration was a form of youth-adult partnership undertaken at Haring's studio in New York City and coincided with the drafting of the United Nations Convention on the Rights of the Child (UNCRC) at the UN General Assembly, also in New York City. The General Assembly adopted the Convention and opened it for signature on 20 November 1989 (the 30th anniversary of its Declaration of the Rights of the Child). The U.S. did not sign the convention until 1995, and remains to the present day the only country in the world not to have ratified the UNCRC.

== Background and collaboration ==
=== Perceptions of childhood ===
Philosopher, Jean-Jacques Rousseau publishes Émile, or On Education (1762) which rejects the doctrine of Original Sin, and asserts that children are innately innocent, only becoming corrupted through experience of the world.

=== Children's perspective as inspiration in art history ===
The unique perspective of children has influenced Art history since Rousseau.

Romantics such as painter Caspar David Friedrich along with writers including William Wordsworth and Samuel Taylor Coleridge promoted the idea that children could see the 'truth of nature' thanks to their "naive" perspective on the world.

John Ruskin in his The Elements of Drawing (1857) encouraged artists to maintain an 'innocence of the eye', a freshness of vision that he called the 'condition of childhood'.

Children's Art has been admired by artists and used as inspiration recurrently, including:

From the late 19th century, Primitivists viewed childhood as the 'primitive' prehistory of the adult.

In the 20th century, artists including Wassily Kandinsky, Joan Miró and Jean Dubuffet avidly collected, studied and in some instances took quite specific cues from children's art.

A recurring theme throughout Haring's career is the value and engagement of youth voice and youth participation. Demonstrated by numerous murals assisted by local young people, such as Tuttomondo and We the Youth, or extensive collaborations with young people such as LA II.

"Children know something that most people have forgotten." — Keith Haring

"What I like about children is their imagination. It's a combination of honesty and freedom they seem to have in expressing whatever is on their minds-and the fact that they have a really sophisticated sense of humor." — Keith Haring

=== Children's art in art history ===
An exhibition of children's art from the classes of artist Franz Cižek was included in the Kunstschau Wien 1908.

Roger Fry exhibited children's art at the Omega Workshops, London in 1917 and 1919.

The International Museum of Children's Art in Oslo, Norway is established in 1986, by the Foundation of Children's History, Art and Culture, which itself was established in 1980. The museum is a member of the Association of Norwegian Museums of Art and Social History, and UNESCO's International Council of Museums. The museum receives an annual grant from the Norwegian Ministry of Culture.

=== Anti-adultism ===
The United Nations Convention on the Rights of the Child (UNCRC, 20 November 1989) formally enshrines the rights of children and young people to participate in matters that affect them:

Article 12.1 provides: "States Parties shall assure to the child who is capable of forming his or her own views the right to express those views freely in all matters affecting the child, the views of the child being given due weight in accordance with the age and maturity of the child."

The UNCRC protects the right of a child to participate in matters that affect them, including, for example, creative expression. However, Haring's collaboration was intended to champion the artistic value of children's creative expression and so actively counter adultism within the art world, especially within high art, by offering equal artistic credit and status to Kalish, whilst Haring was at the height of his career.

"[Art] should be something that liberates the soul, provokes the imagination and encourages people to go further". — Keith Haring

=== Collaboration ===
Produced and financed by Keith Haring in New York City in 1989, coinciding with the UN General Assembly's adoption of the Convention on the Rights of the Child (UNCRC).

Drawn by Haring and Kalish in New York City between 1989 and 1990. The two would pass preliminary works back and forth as they made progress, importantly with Haring offering as much credit to Kalish as to himself.

"Keith was someone who was able to see beyond the usual criteria most of us use to define others. He was open to communication with the essential being regardless of their gender, race, age, etc... I listened to conversations he had with Sean on art ... and the creative process. Frankly, sometimes I was lost. I was thankful that Sean had found someone who he could have these conversations with.

Part of the reason Keith chose etching as a medium for their collaboration was because Sean was not interested in color.

Keith took the time to teach Sean about etching and then to teach him to etch. As part of this process, Keith gave Sean tools to do the etching. Sean was extremely excited after doing the etchings. We got to look at proofs with Keith on a visit to his studio. A lot of people were there that day. It was before the holidays, and I remember that visit as one of the longest and happiest times we spent with Keith. No one wanted the visit to end. I think it was the last time we saw him ..."

— Marta Kalish, mother of Sean. Interviewed November 2004.

"When I was doing etchings with Keith, he let me draw anything I wanted to, and he made me feel that my drawings were very special. He made other children feel that way about their art. It was always fun to be with Keith because he knew how to have fun, just like a kid.

I was about six years old when I met Keith. I was acting at the time, and there was a casting studio a block or so away from the Pop Shop. Every time I had an audition at that studio, my mother would take me into the Pop Shop. Typically, we would stay there for over an hour. After I had been visiting the store for a few months, the manager suggested that I meet Keith.

I first met Keith in his studio. What I remember most about that meeting is that he did not talk down to or patronize me in any way, as adults always do with children. Rather, he spoke to me in perhaps the most honest way anyone ever had at the time.

We always made art during our meetings. We would collaborate, or just work separately and share our art with one another."

— Sean Kalish. Interviewed December 2004.

"Keith and I worked together on some etchings. There were these big metal plates. I would be working on one, and he would be working on one. Then we would switch and keep on drawing. I like drawing, because it's something you can do with someone else. I liked to draw with Keith, because he drew just like a kid. Now there won't be any more Keith Haring drawings. I wanted him to keep drawing for his whole life!" — Sean Kalish

"Children are bearers of life in its simplest and most joyous form" — Keith Haring

Proofed and printed in an edition of 33, by Master printmaker Richard Spare at his Wellington Studios in London, England.

Each print is stamped by the artist's estate, signed and dated verso (on the back) by Sean Kalish and Julia Gruen, Executor of the Keith Haring Estate and Executive director of The Keith Haring Foundation.

== Prints ==
Title	View	Object number	Medium	Notes	Ref.
Untitled	MoMA	105.1991.1	soft-ground and hard-ground	Includes Haring's rhythmic motion lines to express the movement and energy of the dancing figure. Includes sonorous or energetic lines for flatulence humour.	
Untitled	The Keith Haring Foundation	art-work/851	soft-ground and hard-ground	Includes Haring's rhythmic motion lines to express the movement and energy of the dancing figure. Includes sonorous or energetic lines for flatulence humour.	
Untitled	MoMA	105.1991.2	soft-ground and hard-ground		
Untitled	The Keith Haring Foundation	art-work/859	soft-ground and hard-ground		
Untitled	MoMA	105.1991.3	soft-ground and hard-ground		
Untitled	The Keith Haring Foundation	art-work/857	soft-ground and hard-ground		
Untitled	MoMA	105.1991.4	soft-ground and hard-ground		
Untitled	The Keith Haring Foundation	art-work/850	soft-ground and hard-ground		
Untitled	MoMA	105.1991.5	soft-ground and hard-ground	Stylised female figure with Haring's motifs Lucky Strike and Lightning Bolt, alongside Haring's use of his recently deceased friend Basquiat's (1960–88) Crown motif. Echoing Haring's 1988 painting A Pile of Crowns for Jean-Michel Basquiat.	
Untitled	The Keith Haring Foundation	art-work/858	soft-ground and hard-ground	Stylised female figure with Haring's motifs Lucky Strike and Lightning Bolt, alongside Haring's use of his recently deceased friend Basquiat's (1960–88) Crown motif. Echoing Haring's 1988 painting A Pile of Crowns for Jean-Michel Basquiat.	
Untitled	MoMA	105.1991.6	soft-ground and hard-ground		
Untitled	The Keith Haring Foundation	art-work/852	soft-ground and hard-ground		
Untitled	MoMA	105.1991.7	soft-ground and hard-ground		
Untitled	The Keith Haring Foundation	art-work/855	soft-ground and hard-ground		
Untitled	MoMA	105.1991.8	soft-ground and hard-ground	Satire, an obese male figure with small genitalia wearing a mitre. Opposition to US ratification of the UNCRC comes from the 'religious right'.	
Untitled	The Keith Haring Foundation	art-work/856	soft-ground and hard-ground	Satire, an obese male figure with small genitalia wearing a mitre. Opposition to US ratification of the UNCRC comes from the 'religious right'.	
Untitled	MoMA	105.1991.9	soft-ground and hard-ground	Includes Haring's rhythmic motion lines to express movement and energy.	
Untitled	The Keith Haring Foundation	art-work/854	soft-ground and hard-ground	Includes Haring's rhythmic motion lines to express movement and energy.	
Untitled	MoMA	105.1991.10	soft-ground and hard-ground		
Untitled	The Keith Haring Foundation	art-work/853	soft-ground and hard-ground		
Untitled	MoMA	105.1991.11	soft-ground and hard-ground	Includes Haring's rhythmic motion lines to express movement and energy. Includes Kalish's drawing of Basquiat's (1960–88) Crown motif, encircled by Haring's radiant lines (lines radiating from the motif).	
Untitled	The Keith Haring Foundation	art-work/860	soft-ground and hard-ground	Includes Haring's rhythmic motion lines to express movement and energy. Includes Kalish's drawing of Basquiat's (1960–88) Crown motif, encircled by Haring's radiant lines (lines radiating from the motif).	

== Public collections ==
The complete series of eleven etchings is held in the permanent collections of:

- The Museum of Modern Art, New York.
- The Keith Haring Foundation, New York.

== Exhibitions ==
The complete series of eleven etchings have featured in the following exhibitions:

18 February 2006 – 6 August 2006: Keith Haring: Journey of the Radiant Baby, Reading Public Museum, Reading, Pennsylvania, USA.

'This catalog and exhibition document for the first time the unique body of work Haring completed through extraordinary collaborations with young friends and artists such as LA II, Kenny Scharf, Sean Kalish, Zena Scharf, Sean Lennon and Nina Clemente'.
'Exhibition co-curator Ron Roth examines Haring's ardent social activism and utilization of the potential of art to enlarge public support and involvement in a variety of charitable causes, one of the definitive contributions of Haring's work'.

29 May 2021 – 11 October 2021: Keith Haring: Radiant Vision, Fenimore Art Museum, Cooperstown, New York, USA.

Explored 'how Haring fought for change, using art as a platform for activism'. Described as a 'tribute to this iconic artist and his dedication to social justice and the betterment of youth worldwide'. Curated by Katharine J. Wright and organised in conjunction with Pan-Art Connections, Inc., touring to venues in the USA and Italy:

1 November 2021 – 6 February 2022: Keith Haring: Radiant Vision, Naples Art Institute, Naples, Florida, USA.
30 September 2022 – 29 January 2023: Keith Haring: Radiant Vision, Orangerie, Reggia di Monza, Monza, Italy.

17 September 2023 – 4 February 2024: Keith Haring: Radiant Vision, Palazzo Tarasconi, Parma, Italy.

12 March 2022 – 31 July 2022: Keith Haring: A Radiant Legacy, Michener Art Museum, Doylestown, Pennsylvania, USA.

9 March 2023 – 26 August 2023: Keith Haring "Untitled", Arena Herzliya, Tel Aviv, Israel.

== Reception ==
"The results have surprisingly loose, refreshing edges and subjects." — William Jaeger, Times Union

"This series struck me. Like all people I'm familiar with his more iconic work, his pictograms. I like this because it also shows the influences of artists like Paul Klee, who Haring said was a great influence. So besides contemporaries such as Kenny Scharf, Andy Warhol and Walt Disney — Haring found inspiration in the Modern masters". [Verpoorten recalled a magazine interview with Haring on the subject]. "He talked about how liberating he found the art of Pierre Alechinsky, Jean Dubuffet and Pablo Picasso, and how he united that free form in his work." — Frank Verpoorten, Executive Director, Naples Art Institute

== Influence ==
(2019–) Young Artists' Summer Show, a free annual open submission exhibition at the Royal Academy of Arts, for young artists aged 4–19 years studying in the UK. Modelled on the annual Royal Academy Summer Exhibition, it is a platform for children's art that advocates the importance of access to art, and the benefits of encouraging the arts, for children and young people.

== See also ==
Haring etchings
- The Valley

Haring artworks about youth empowerment

- We the Youth
- Tuttomondo

Themes

- Child art
- Youth voice
- Youth-adult partnership
- U.S. ratification of the Convention on the Rights of the Child
- Positive youth development
- Youth empowerment
- Developmental psychology
- Adultism
- Adultcentrism

Related movements

- Artivism
- Naïve art
- Outsider art
- Protest art
