= Hector Torres (designer) =

Puerto Rican fashion designer

- Born: 1943/44; Aibonito, Puerto Rico
- Died: July 7, 1990; Manhattan, New York
- Occupation: fashion designer

Hector Torres (1943/44 – July 7, 1990) was a Puerto Rican fashion designer. Torres was part of the group of Hispanic designers in New York who rose to prominence in the 1970s. He specialized in working in leather. Torres worked with fashion designers Stephen Burrows, Halston, and Fernando Sanchez before designing his own collection. He died from AIDS-related complications in 1990.

== Life and career ==
Hector Torres was born in Aibonito, Puerto Rico. He graduated from the Fashion Institute of Technology (FIT) in Manhattan in the 1960s.

Torres worked as a fabric designer at designer Stephen Burrows' O Boutique, which opened on Park Avenue South in 1968. Burrows and Torres along with Burrow's friend from FIT, William Hill, as the patternmaker and leatherwear designer Bobby Breslau, worked out of the basement of the boutique.

In 1970, the O Boutique closed and Burrows opened an in-store boutique within the luxury department store Henri Bendel on West 57th Street. Torres worked as Burrows' assistant in the early 1970s. Fashion model Pat Cleveland, who was a fitting model for Burrows at Bendel's studio recalled, "Hector was sort of Stephen's right hand, a homey type who took time with the older ladies who came in the studio."

After working with Burrows, Torres worked with designers Halston and Fernando Sanchez before creating his own collection of separates. Fashion editor Patricia Peterson wrote for The New York Times that Torres "designs bright, sexy clothes that seem to reflect his playful personality."

In August 1975, was one of the Nuyorican designers referred to as "The New Ricans" in Interview magazine. Actress Rita Moreno wore a silk organza flounce dress designed by Torres on the cover of the issue. A tuxedo designed by Torres appeared on the cover of Esquire in April 1981.

Torres was a friend and collaborator of pop artist Keith Haring. Torres designed pink leather suits that Haring painted with graffiti artist Angel Ortiz (LA ll) in 1983. Singer Madonna wore one of the pink leather suits for Haring's birthday party at the Paradise Garage in 1984. In 1985, Torres made Haring a lamé gold tuxedo.

He also worked for Calvin Klein. At the time of his illness from AIDS, he was making custom-made garments for private clients.

== Death ==
Torres died of AIDS-related pneumonia at the age of 46 at St. Luke's-Roosevelt Hospital Center in Manhattan on July 7, 1990. He was survived by his parents, Pura and Ignacio Torres, two sisters, and two brothers.
