= Bobby Breslau =

American fashion accessories designer

Bobby Breslau (1942/43 – January 30, 1987) was an American designer of fashion accessories. After starting out in the garment industry alongside Stephen Burrows in the 1960s, a chance commission from fashion designer Halston redirected him toward accessories and furniture, where his unstructured leather handbags were hailed by The New York Times as "the handbag of the 1970's." In the 1980s, he collaborated closely with Pop artist Keith Haring until his death from AIDS-related complications in 1987.

== Life and career ==
=== Early life and career ===
Breslau was a New York native. In the late 1960s, he was working as a graphic designer when he met fashion designer Stephen Burrows on Fire Island in New York. Breslau worked as a leatherwear designer at Burrows' O Boutique, which opened in Manhattan in 1968. Burrows and Breslau along with Burrows' friend from FIT, William Hill, as the patternmaker and fabric designer Hector Torres, worked out of the basement of the boutique.

Breslau and Burrows shared an apartment in the East Village in the early 1970s. After the O Boutique closed in 1970, Breslau managed Stephen Burrows World, an in-store boutique at the luxury department store Henri Bendel in Manhattan. He also became one of Burrows' assistants. Fashion model Pat Cleveland, who was a fitting model for Burrows at Bendel's studio recalled, "Bobby was tiny, animated, and enthusiastic about almost everything Stephen did."

=== Handbag design and fashion career ===
In the early 1970s, Breslau began making bags when Halston asked him to make a fringed toy and some fringed pillows. Breslau studied the construction of a baseball and emulated the stitching while sewing a fringed leather pillow. Fashion designer Fernando Sanchez mistook the pillow for a handbag so Breslau added a strap and began using that design to create handbags. Breslau also stated, "The whole concept of the bag came from a Japanese puzzle bag Elsa brought back from Japan—one of those bags that just folds and ties and has no seams."

Breslau handmade each handbag in his East Village apartment until 1976. He gave the first to his friend, jewelry designer Elsa Peretti, whom he described as his inspiration, and the second to actress Carol Channing. Through Peretti, he became part of a circle of Halston associates that included Marina Schiano, director of public relations for Rive Gauche and Yves Saint Laurent; artist Joe Eula; photographer Berry Berenson Perkins; and various models and fashion personalities. Breslau produced his bags in a range of colors and sizes, and they were featured in a Halston collection, where they became known as the "Halston bag." Their jaunty, youthful quality complemented Halston's spare designs and drew significant attention from fashion professionals. Following this exposure, Breslau's bags were sold at Halston's Madison Avenue boutique.

Breslau later recalled, "Halston and Joe Eula were the teachers. Working with them was like going to the best university in the country." The design proved highly popular among models, designers, and celebrities, leading to widespread knockoffs. According to the Chicago Tribune, the "Halston bag" was chosen by the Smithsonian Institution "as part of a permanent collection of 20 of this century's most influential looks in American fashion." In 1975, to complement his well-known large sac, Breslau introduced a smaller version, which he called "the littlest hobo of them all." The design featured slender straps that could be worn over the shoulder or at the waist.

In 1976, Breslau began designing for Andrew Manufacturing Company, a subsidiary of Andrew Geller, Inc., known for producing high-end women's shoes. He signed a deal for his own fashion label which allowed him to mass produce his designs at a lower cost than his handmade bags. In 1977, Breslau created a new handbag that could be used in three ways. It was a "super-soft leather drawstring pouch with a twist to the top and a softly gathered shoulder strap." It was made in various colors and size options so that it could be "everything from a little evening bag to a jumbo weekender."

Breslau's designs appeared in Women's Wear Daily and Vogue. Diana Vreeland, former editor-in-chief of Vogue, wrote Breslau a note that said "you are to leather what Cellini was to gold." In the late 1970s, his pillow-clutches were sold at the luxury department store Neiman Marcus, and his handbags were sold at Cul de Sac, a boutique for accessories in the luxury department store Bloomingdale's. In 1979, Breslau licensed two pattern designs to Vogue for his "Big Pouch" and "Little Pouch." His Vogue Patterns provided sewers with directions to make both handbags in three sizes.

=== Leatherwork and collaboration with Keith Haring ===
He also made leather bean bag chairs while continuing to handcraft pillows. In 1981, Breslau told The New York Times, "I feel that as far as the pillows are concerned, that I'm a sculptor and that my medium is leather." He liked to mix textures and worked with a variety of leathers such as "printed suedes and ostrich skin, cowhide, bronze and silver leathers, alligator as well as back leather, decorated with black patent-leather drops." He used a softer palette for his pillows.

Breslau was a close friend of pop artist Keith Haring, who he met at the Paradise Garage in the early 1980s. Haring respected Breslau's craftsmanship and looked to him for guidance, calling him his "Jewish mother." Haring credited Breslau with inspiring him to work with leather hides for his exhibition at the Fun Gallery in 1983. Breslau managed Haring's Pop Shop in SoHo, which opened in 1986, and he supervised the merchandising. The leather "baby" pillow that Breslau made for Haring was the protype for the "inflatable baby" sold at the shop.

== Death ==
In early 1987, Breslau developed a lung problem, and within a week of checking himself into the hospital, he died at the age of 44 from AIDS-related complications on January 30, 1987. He is buried in a Jewish cemetery in Connecticut.

In an interview with journalist David Sheff for Rolling Stone in 1989, Haring, who also died from AIDS-related complications in 1990, recalled:

When Andy passed away, I had just lost a friend of mine who was sort of like a guardian angel for me, Bobby Breslau. He was like my conscience, my Jiminy Cricket. He was working here until he got so sick that he couldn't even come to work. I think he knew that he was really sick, but it wasn't diagnosed as AIDS for a long time. By the time he went to the hospital, he died within a week.
