= La 2 =

La 2, LA 2, LA2 or LA-2 may refer to:

- LA II or LA2 is the artist name of American graffiti artist Angel Ortiz
- Astoria 2, formerly "LA2", was a nightclub in London, England
- Louisiana Highway 2, a state highway in Louisiana
- Louisiana's 2nd congressional district, an American congressional district
- Luminous Arc 2, a strategy RPG for the Nintendo DS

== Broadcasting ==
- France 2, a French TV channel, formerly called La deux (La 2)
- La 2 (Spanish TV channel)
- RSI La 2, a Swiss Italian-language TV channel
