= Anthony Dyson =

Anthony Dyson may refer to:

- A. E. Dyson (1928–2002), British literary critic, lecturer, educational activist and gay rights campaigner
- Anthony Dyson (artist) (1931–2023), English artist
- Anthony Dyson (priest) (1935–1998), priest in the Church of England and professor of theology
- Tony Dyson (1947–2016), British special effects designer
