= Joan Williams =

Joan Williams may refer to:

- Joan Franks Williams (1930–2003), American composer
- Ursula Vaughan Williams (Joan Ursula Penton Vaughan Williams; 1911–2007), English poet and author
- Joan Williams (author) (1928–2004), American author
- Joan C. Williams (born 1952), feminist theorist
- Joan Williams (artist), Welsh artist and teacher

== Fictional characters ==
- Joan Garrick (née Williams), DC Comics character
- Joan Manning Williams, character in Alibi (1929 film)
- Joan Williams (Arrowverse), Arrowverse character
