= Richard Spare =

British artist and master printmaker (born 1951)

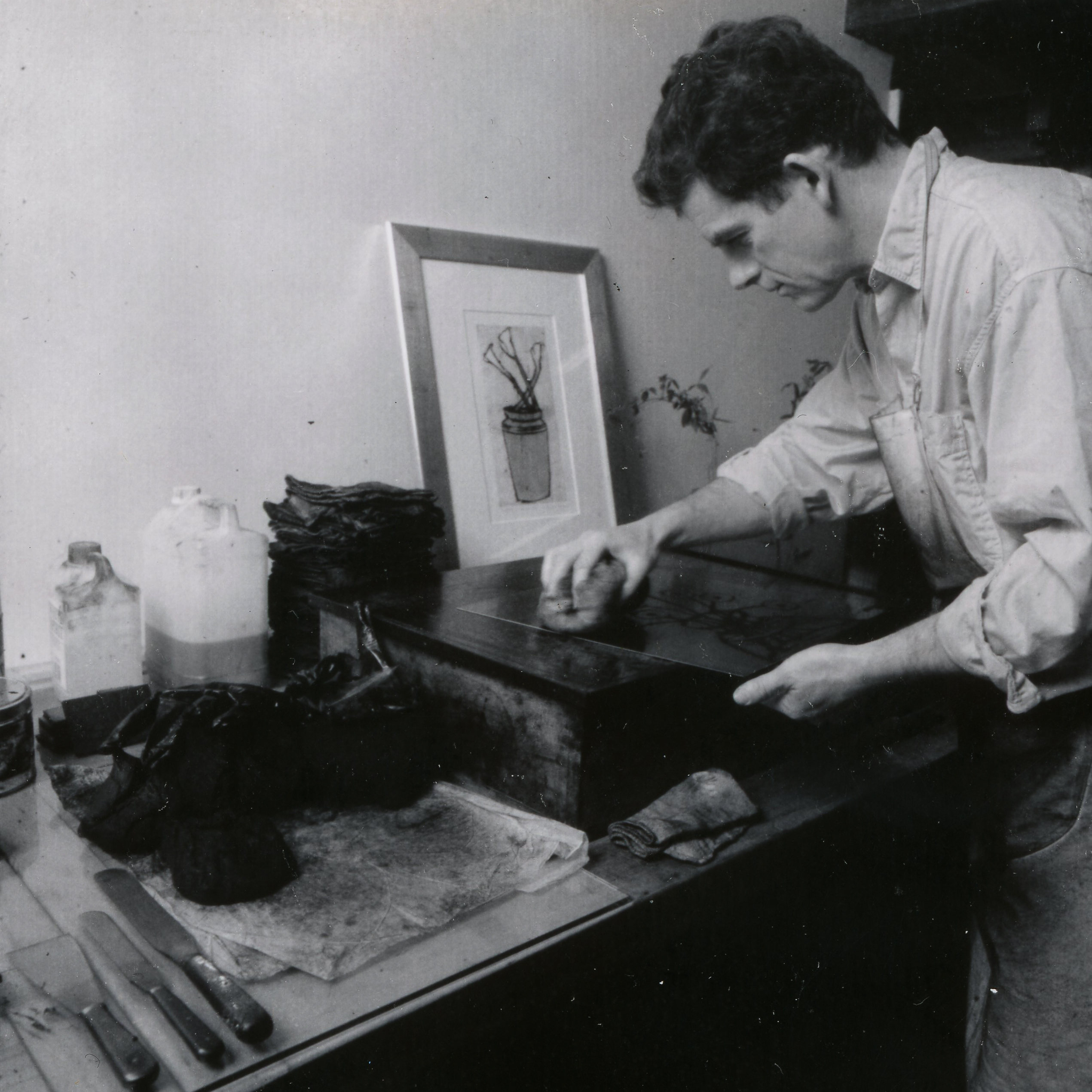
- Richard Spare scrim-wiping the copper plate of his drypoint 'Poppy Spray' c.1999
- Born: Richard John Spare; 16 April 1951 (age 75); Chelmsford, Essex, England
- Education: Maidstone College of Art (1971–74), Fred Cuming, Joan Williams; Thomas Ross & Son (1974–77), Stubbs, Turner, Hogarth, Cruikshank, Rowlandson, Gillray, Landseer, Martin
- Occupations: Artist; Master printmaker
- Known for: Founder of Wellington Studios; Printmaking; drypoint; etching; painting

Collaborations
- David Hockney: The Blue Guitar (1977)
- Tate Gallery: William Daniell: A Voyage Round Great Britain (1979); Ceri Richards (1979–81); George Stubbs
- British Museum: Banks' Florilegium
- Royal Academy of Arts: J. M. W. Turner aquatints; John Constable
- Jasper Johns: Untitled Series (1988)
- Keith Haring: The Valley (1989–90); Untitled Series (with Sean Kalish) (1989–90)
- Donald Sultan: Dominoes (1990); Playing Cards (1990–91)
- Francesco Clemente: Geography (1992); Dante’s Inferno (1993)
- Robert Ryman: Catalogue Raisonné (1993); Couples Portfolio (1993)
- Website: richardspare.art

Richard John Spare (born 1951) is a British artist and master printmaker known primarily for his drypoints, etchings and oil paintings. He is based in London.

== Biography ==
=== Education and early career ===
Spare attended Maidstone College of Art (1971–74) (now the University for the Creative Arts) where he studied painting under Fred Cuming. On leaving art college, Spare honed his technical skills as a printmaker at Thomas Ross & Son of Putney (1974–77), where he was involved in printing George Stubbs prints, which were sold through the Tate Gallery, and the renovation of fine Turner aquatint plates, which were exhibited at the Royal Academy of Arts Turner Bi-centenary Exhibition. Spare also printed original plates from masters including Hogarth, Cruikshank, Rowlandson, Gillray, Landseer and mezzotints by Martin.

=== Master Printmaker ===
A Master Printmaker, Spare has editioned work for many contemporary artists, including David Hockney, Robert Ryman, Francesco Clemente, Donald Sultan, Jim Dine and Keith Haring. In 1977 he worked with David Hockney as his assistant, setting up an etching studio for him and printing five editions from Hockney's The Blue Guitar suite. Being able to watch Hockney at work on his sets for the Glyndebourne Magic Flute developed Spare's technical interests and appreciation of simple form.

In 1979 Spare participated in the printing of William Daniell's A Voyage Round Great Britain, topographical views of Great Britain, for the Tate Gallery. A posthumous edition of Ceri Richards' images followed 1979–81; sold in conjunction with the exhibition of his work at the Tate Gallery in 1981.

In the early eighties, Spare was involved in printing the Banks' Florilegium in colour (Egerton-Williams Studio), the largest restorative printmaking project of the twentieth century. The plates for the 743 engravings of plants, from watercolours by Sydney Parkinson were made during the first voyage of James Cook to Australia. Having been stored in the British Museum for 200 years, wrapped in a paper containing acid, they had become corroded. Meticulous restoration and demanding à la poupée printing ended with the Museum's Botanical Editor checking them for botanical correctness before they could be published.

In 1988 Spare worked in New York with Jasper Johns, proofing and editioning complex carborundum prints.

Between 1989 and 1990 Spare collaborated with Keith Harring and William S. Burroughs, printing the entirety of The Valley suite at his Wellington Studios in London. Published in 1990. Other collaborations with Haring included the series Untitled Series (with Sean Kalish) along with independent etchings.

=== Artist ===
Since the late 1980s Spare has concentrated solely on his own work, which derives from nature and travel, publishing more than 400 images.

== Artwork ==
Richard Spare's produces hand-printed and watercolored original dry points characterized by a minimalist style. Color is a crucial element to Spare's work, each being selected to 'vibrate with the velvet black of the drypoint line'. Spare's Wellington Studio garden in Charlton was designed as a rich source of inspiration. Focusing on wildlife it is a 'small haven' for the subjects of many of his works. Wellington Studio is a 'homage' to the art of printmaking, with five restored antique etching presses, housed in a converted Victorian coach house.

=== Selected exhibitions ===
==== Solo exhibitions ====
- (2001–21) 13 tours of Japan with over 200 Solo exhibitions in cities the length of the archipelago, from Sapporo in Hokkaido in the north to Naha in Okinawa in the south, and including Tokyo, Osaka, Yokohama, Hiroshima, Matsuyama, Sendai, Sapporo, Kobe, Kyoto, Nagoya, Fukuoka, Kagoshima, Kawagoe, and Nara.
- (2012) Guest International Artist at the Toorak Village Art Fair, Melbourne 2012. Solo exhibitions in Ballarat and Daylesford, Victoria, Australia.

Solo exhibitions in the UK include The Craft Centre and Design Gallery, Leeds Art Gallery, Trevelyan College, University of Durham and Cambridge Gallery.

==== Group exhibitions ====
- (1973–2024) A frequent exhibitor at the Royal Academy Summer Exhibition, Spare has exhibited 45 artworks across 31 exhibitions as of the 2024 Academy Summer Show; his work was first selected in 1973.
- (1983) Selected by Nicholas Serota for the 1983 Whitechapel Open Exhibition at the Whitechapel Gallery in the East End of London. Alongside other then emerging artists including Anthony Gormley, Alison Wilding, Axel Hütte, Shirazeh Houshiary, Hannah Collins, Richard Wentworth, Roger Ackling, Vicken Parsons, Eileen Cooper, Richard Wilson, Hughie O'Donoghue, Humphrey Ocean, Jean-Luc Vilmouth, John Keane and Peter Robinson.
- (1986) Spare represented the UK at the Ninth British International Print Biennale in 1986 alongside David Hockney, Richard Hamilton, Eduardo Paolozzi, Howard Hodgkin, Peter Blake, Frank Auerbach, Patrick Caulfield, Joe Tilson, Tess Jaray, and Norman Ackroyd. The 346 exhibitors included Robert Rauschenberg, Roy Lichtenstein, Alex Katz, Frank Stella, Jim Dine, R.B. Kitaj and Elaine de Kooning from the United States, Tadanori Yokoo and Tetsuya Noda from Japan and Emilio Vedova from Italy.
- (1996–97, 1999–2000) Shortlisted four times for the Hunting Art Prize.
- (1997, 2005) Spare has twice been an invited exhibitor at The Discerning Eye ING Art Prize exhibition at the Mall Galleries.

Other notable mixed shows with the Royal College of Art, The Royal Society of Painter-Etchers and Engravers, Royal West of England Academy, Royal Cambrian Academy of Art, Royal Hibernian Academy, Society of Graphic Fine Art, Society of Wildlife Artists and the Royal Society of British Artists and galleries including the Mall Galleries, the Folkestone Metropole Galleries, the Whitechapel Gallery and the Barbican Art Gallery.

=== Awards ===
In September 2025, the Open University awarded Spare an honorary degree, Doctor of the University, during a graduation ceremony held at the Barbican Centre in London.

=== Collections ===
Richard Spare's work appears in numerous public and private collections worldwide, including:

- Victoria & Albert Museum, London
- British Library, London
- Leeds Art Gallery
- Museum of London
- Berlin Central and Regional Library
- Federation University Australia, Victoria
- Chelmsford Museum
- Maidstone Museum & Art Gallery
- Aston University, Birmingham
- University of Durham

=== Publications ===
- Cover illustration ('Snowdrop') for poetry publication: Iron String, A. Lighthart, Airlie Press, Oregon, USA. 1 October 2013. ISBN 098210667X
- 'Rowing Boat I' reproduced to exemplify a drypoint in Etching – a guide to traditional techniques, A. Smith, The Crowood Press, 2004. ISBN 1861265972
- Galerie d'Amour, J. Powls, Poetry@MMD, 1998. ISBN 0953478505 Illustrated by Richard Spare and Kay Spare.
- Richard Spare – Printmaker, Beatrice Royal Contemporary Art & Craft, The Beatrice Royal Art Gallery, Tramman Trust, 2000.
