= U.S. ratification of the Convention on the Rights of the Child =

The United States has signed the United Nations Convention on the Rights of the Child (UNCRC); however, it remains the only United Nations member state to have not ratified it after Somalia ratified it in 2015.

U.S. non-ratification of this document results in children having no standing in court. Several U.S. states have no minimum age for marriage, and children with no standing in court cannot divorce until reaching 18 years of age. Babies, children and teens can be denied safe lifesaving medical help because of parental religious beliefs. The Convention also addresses issues concerning education, health care, juvenile justice, and the rights of children with disabilities.

== Constitutional requirements ==
Under the United States Constitution, the ratification of treaties involves several steps. First, the president or their representative would negotiate, agree, and sign a treaty, which would then be submitted to the United States Senate for its "advice and consent". At that time, the president would explain and interpret all provisions in the treaty. If the Senate approves the treaty with a two-thirds majority, it goes back to the president, who can ratify it.

== History and status ==
The United States government contributed to the drafting of the Convention. It commented on nearly all of the articles and proposed the original text of seven of them. Three of these come directly from the United States Constitution and were proposed by the administration of President Ronald Reagan. The Convention was adopted by the UN General Assembly on 20 November 1989 and came into effect on 2 September 1990.

On 16 February 1995, Madeleine Albright, at the time the United States Ambassador to the United Nations, signed the Convention. However, though generally supportive of the Convention, President Bill Clinton did not submit it to the Senate. Likewise, President Bush did not submit the Convention to the Senate. During his presidency, Barack Obama described the failure to ratify the Convention as "embarrassing", and promised to review it. The Obama administration said that it intended to submit the Convention to the Senate, but failed to do so. Throughout the entirety of Donald Trump's presidency, his administration did not submit the convention for Senate ratification either. Trump so far has not submitted the treaty to the Senate during his second term, and no action regarding the treaty was taken during the presidential administration of Joe Biden.

States may, when ratifying the Convention, ratify subject to reservations or interpretations. Besides other obligations, ratification of the Convention would require the United States to submit reports outlining its implementation on the domestic level to the United Nations Committee on the Rights of the Child, a panel of child rights experts from around the world. Parties must report initially two years after acceding to (ratifying) the Convention and then every five years.

== Support ==
Many organizations in the United States support ratification of the Convention, including groups that work with children, such as the Girl Scouts and Kiwanis. The "Campaign for U.S. Ratification of the Convention on the Rights of the Child" argues that criticisms mentioned by opponents of the convention "are the result of misconceptions, erroneous information, and a lack of understanding about how international human rights treaties are implemented in the United States".

The Campaign for U.S. Ratification of the Convention on the Rights of the Child is a volunteer-driven network that includes attorneys, child and human rights advocates, educators, members of religious and faith-based communities, non-governmental organizations (NGOs), students, and other concerned citizens. They help to promote the ratification of the UNCRC. This campaign began in 2002 and works through a National Steering Committee, campaign meetings, youth advisory council, and special events with many different partners involved. Its campaign is guided by its mission statement: "Our mission is to bring about ratification and implementation of the CRC in the United States. We will achieve this through mobilizing our diverse network to educate communities on the Convention, thereby creating a groundswell of national support for the treaty, and by advocating directly with our government on behalf of ratification."

== Opposition ==
Opposition to ratification comes from some religious groups. These, along with many political conservatives, state that the Convention conflicts with the United States Constitution because, in the original language of the Constitution, "treaties" referred only to international relations (military alliances, trade, etc.) and not domestic policies. This has apparently played a significant role in the non-ratification of the treaty so far. Senator Jesse Helms, the former chairman of the Senate Foreign Relations Committee, described it as a "bag of worms," an effort to "chip away at the U.S. Constitution."

Some Americans oppose the CRC with the reasoning that the nation already has in place everything the treaty espouses, and therefore it would make no practical difference.

== Arguments ==
=== Sovereignty and federalism ===
Legal concerns over ratification have mostly focused on issues of sovereignty and federalism. For example, the American conservative think tank The Heritage Foundation portrayed ratification as an issue of international control over domestic policy: "Although not originally promoted as an entity that would become involved in actively seeking to shape member states' domestic policies, the U.N. has become increasingly intrusive in these arenas." They express concern about "sovereign jurisdiction, over domestic policymaking" and "preserving the freedom of American Civil Society", and argue that the actual practice of some United Nations Committees has been to review national policies that are unrelated, or at most marginally related, to the actual language of the Convention.

However, as a "non-self-executing treaty," the convention does not grant any international body enforcement authority over the United States or its citizens, but merely obligates the United States federal government to submit periodic reports on how the provisions of the treaty are being met (or not). The sole enforcement mechanism within the Convention is the issuing of a written report.

Precedence for ratification has already been set, with US ratification of multiple other UN Human Rights Treaties, including UNCPPCG (1988), UNCAT (1992), UNICERD (1994), alongside two of the three optional protocols of the UNCRC (2002) itself.

=== Death penalty and life imprisonment ===
Article 37 of the Convention prohibits sentencing children under 18 years old to the death penalty or to life imprisonment with no opportunity for parole. The United States does not comply with this article in its entirety. Three successive Supreme Court decisions have moved towards compliance and a fourth reducing the barrier for juvenile life-without-parole sentencing:

- In 2005, 25 U.S. states allowed for the execution of juvenile offenders. This ceased after the 2005 Supreme Court decision Roper v. Simmons, which found juvenile execution unconstitutional as "cruel and unusual punishment". The decision cited the Convention as one of several indications that "the United States now stands alone in a world that has turned its face against the juvenile death penalty".
- The 2010 decision Graham v. Florida prohibited the sentencing of juveniles to life imprisonment without the possibility of parole for non-homicide crimes. As of the Graham decision, six U.S. states prohibited such sentences in all cases.
- The June 2012 Supreme Court decision Miller v. Alabama held that mandatory sentences of life without the possibility of parole are unconstitutional for juvenile murderers. The ruling did not prohibit courts from imposing a considered life sentence on juveniles.
- The April 2021 Supreme Court decision Jones v. Mississippi allows courts to impose life-without-parole sentencing for juvenile offenders without first finding that a juvenile is permanently incorrigible.

The United States is the only country in the world that continues to sentence juveniles to life in prison without the possibility of parole. Although twenty-eight states and the District of Columbia have banned these sentences for juveniles, nearly 1,500 people were still serving life-without-parole sentences for crimes committed as juveniles as of 2020.

=== Parental rights ===
Some supporters of homeschooling have expressed concern that the Convention will subvert the authority of parents.

One of the most controversial tenets of the Convention is the participatory rights granted to children. The Convention champions youth voice in new ways. Article 12 states:

Parties shall assure to the child who is capable of forming his or her or their own views the right to express those views freely in all matters affecting the child, the views of the child being given due weight in accordance with the age and maturity of the child ... the child shall, in particular, be provided the opportunity to be heard in any judicial and administrative proceedings affecting the child ...

David M. Smolin argues that Article 29 limits the fundamental right of parents and others to educate children in private school by requiring that all such schools support the principles contained in the United Nations Charter and a list of specific values and ideals. He argues that "Supreme Court case law has provided that a combination of parental rights and religious liberties provide a broader right of parents and private schools to control the values and curriculum of private education free from State interference.

Smolin, otherwise a proponent who urges U.S. reservations to the convention, argues that Article 5, which includes a provision stating that parents "provide, in a manner consistent with the evolving capacities of the child, appropriate direction and guidance in the exercise by the child of the rights recognized in the present Convention", "is couched in language which seems to reduce the parental role to that of giving advice".^{, pages 81 & 90} The Campaign for U.S. Ratification of the Convention on the Rights of the Child argues that the Convention protects parental responsibility from government interference. Child advocacy groups draw attention to the fact that treaty ratification would stop parents from sending their children to military schools at young ages. They argue that military indoctrination of children is unnatural and it cements a world view of war, violence, and soldiering at a young age.

The Campaign for the U.S. Ratification of the CRC believes, instead, that the CRC does not outline any specific interference with school curricula, nor would ratification prevent parents from homeschooling their children. In addition, the CRC recognizes the family "as the fundamental group of society and the natural environment for the growth and well-being of all its members and particularly children ..." (Preamble to the CRC) and repeatedly underscores the pivotal role parents play in their children's lives (Articles 3, 5, 7-10, 14, 18, 22, and 27.1). Under the Convention, parental responsibility is protected from government interference. Article 5 states that Governments should respect the rights, responsibilities, and duties of parents to raise their children. There is no language in the CRC that dictates the manner in which parents are to raise and instruct their children.

Geraldine Van Bueren, the author of the principal textbook on the international rights of the child, and a participant in the drafting of the Convention, has described the "best interest of the child standard" in the treaty as "provid[ing] decision and policy makers with the authority to substitute their own decisions for either the child's or the parents' ";

==== Issues within parental rights ====
1. The treaty addresses parental rights to withhold life saving medical care for religious reasons, to discipline and discipline in schools. There is a concern that it will eliminate parents' right to discipline. The UNCRC does not specify what discipline can be used but calls on parents to provide guidance and direction to children instead of punishment. Educational discipline is addressed by eliminating mental or physical abuse and violence. Dress codes and singing the national anthem are not addressed and left to the school officials and governments to determine if either should be protected.
2. The age of children and their ability to understand the UNCRC and the rights they get also raise questions. Parents' decisions on how they address the UNCRC will help the development of children. Parental guidance should help children evolve and teach them to respect their own and others' rights.
3. Another concern is whether or not the UNCRC will give the children more rights than parents. Parents still have control over their children; for example, they can expect children to help around the house. The Convention only prohibits work that is harmful to their health or interferes with education. This concern, however, seems to show a lack of awareness that children are more vulnerable than their adult parents and thus require special protection.

=== Other arguments ===
Smolin argues that the objections from religious and political conservatives stem from their view that the U.N. is an elitist institution, which they do not trust to properly handle sensitive decisions regarding family issues. He suggests that legitimate concerns of critics could be met with appropriate reservations by the U.S.^{, page 110}

== Cultural references ==
Untitled Series (with Sean Kalish), is a series of etchings drawn between 1989 and 1990 by artist Keith Haring in collaboration with Sean Kalish, a 9-year-old patron of the Pop Shop. This anti-adultist artistic collaboration was a form of youth-adult partnership undertaken at Haring's studio in New York City and coincided with, and responded to, the drafting of the United Nations Convention on the Rights of the Child (UNCRC) at the United Nations General Assembly, also in New York City. The series is critical of opposition to the UNCRC, and it champions youth voice in a new way, as described in Article 12 of the Convention. The UN General Assembly adopted the Convention and opened it for signature on 20 November 1989 (the 30th anniversary of its Declaration of the Rights of the Child). This was one of the final projects undertaken by Haring, and the last to involve etching, before his death on 16 February 1990, age 31. The United States of America did not sign the convention until 16 February 1995, exactly five years later. An edition of the artwork is held in the permanent collection of the Museum of Modern Art.

== See also ==
- United States and the United Nations Convention on the Law of the Sea
