= Hobo bag =

Style of handbag

Hobo bags

The hobo bag is a style of handbag or purse that is typically large and characterized by a crescent shape, a slouchy posture and a long strap designed to wear over the shoulder. Hobo bags are made out of soft, flexible materials and tend to slump, or slouch, when set down. There are many different sizes and shapes of this popular woman's fashion accessory.

Accessories designer Bobby Breslau was known for his "Halston bag", a large unconstructed leather handbag. It was declared "the handbag of the 1970's" by The New York Times. To balance his large slouchy "Halston bag," Breslau came out with what he called "the littlest hobo of them all" in 1975.

The hobo bag saw a resurgence of popularity in the early to mid-2000s, with many celebrities such as Paris Hilton and Mary-Kate and Ashley Olsen popularizing the style as part of a larger Boho-chic trend.

This style of purse is called a hobo bag because it resembles the shape of the bindle on a stick that hobos are portrayed as carrying over their shoulder in drawings and cartoons.
