= Lettuce hem =

Frilled hem invented by Stephen Burrows

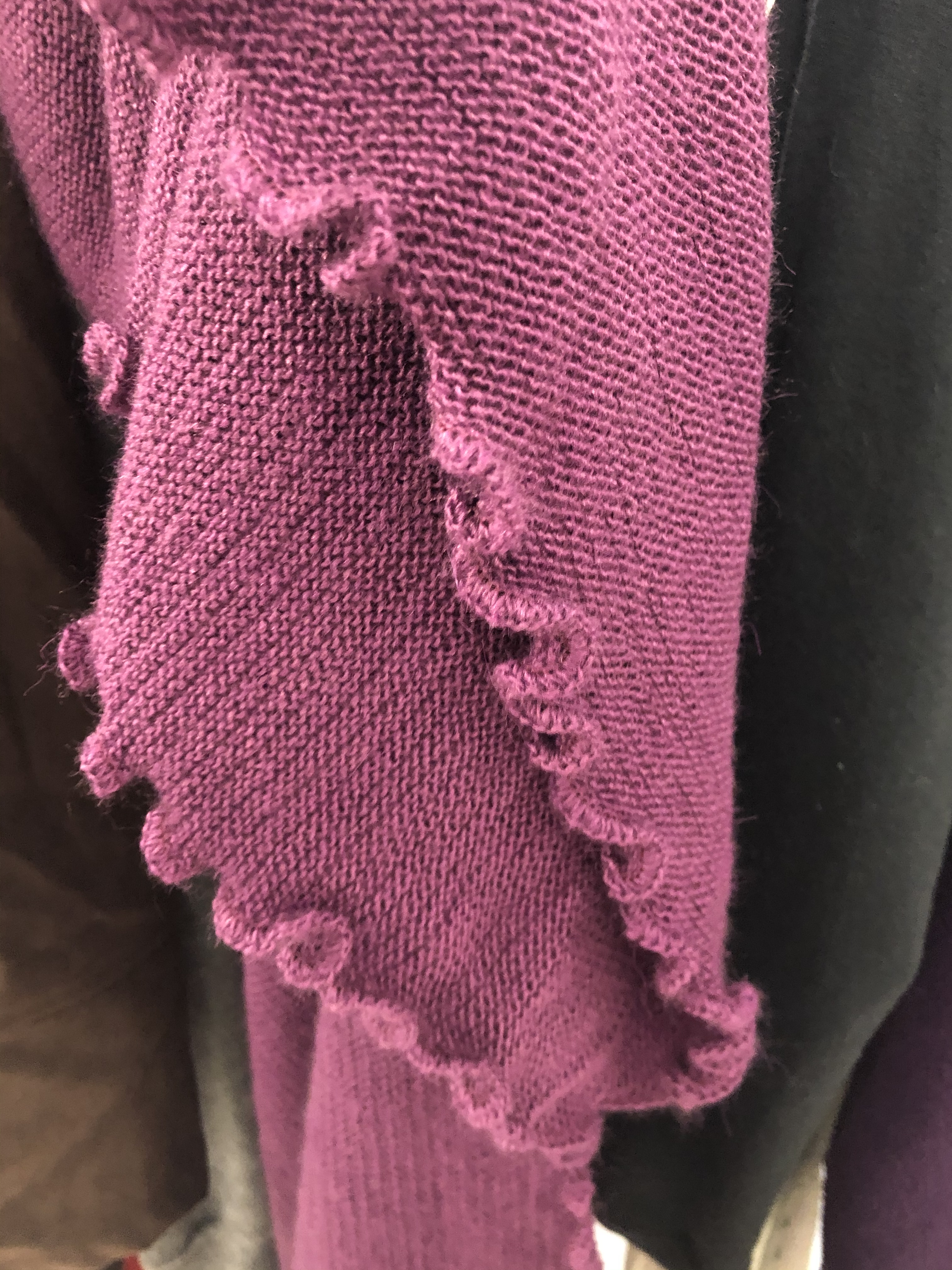
A knit shawl featuring a lettuce hem.

A lettuce hem is a frilled hem invented by Stephen Burrows. The hem was popular in the disco era for how it added movement to a garment.

== Description ==
The lettuce hem is named for its resemblance to a lettuce leaf. The hem gets its characteristic waves from a zig-zag overlock stitching pattern typical of Burrows' work, which emphasized rather than concealed hems and stitching. The technique is mostly used on knit textiles such as jersey fabric, which allow the hem to hold its shape.

== History ==
Stephen Burrows invented the lettuce hem in the 1970s. The nature of the invention is disputed, with The Museum at FIT characterizing the invention as arising from a sewing error while the FIDM Museum claims he was inspired by Diana Vreeland requesting a garment in "lettuce green." Regardless, the hem became a signature of Burrows and remained popular throughout the decade. The style reemerged in the 1990s, particularly on knit "babydoll" style T-shirts. Lettuce hems became popular again in the late 2010s and early 2020s, largely as a reference to the 1990s iteration of the trend. With the increased interest in upcycling old and thrifted clothing during this period, the lettuce hem became a way to update a garment. The patchwork top, which features lettuce hems all across the garment rather than just along the edges, enjoyed popularity starting in 2020.
