= The Valley (suite) =

1990 suite of etchings by Keith Haring with text by William S. Burroughs

- Artist: Keith Haring
- Year: 1989, April (drawn); 1989–90 (printed); 1990 (published)
- Catalogue: Littmann 136-141
- Medium: 16 Etchings (soft-ground and hard-ground) in black ink; Text in red ink (photo-etched) on 16 sheets; Colophon (lithograph); All on Twinrocker handmade cotton paper (watermarked with the initials of the artist and the author); Presented in a black case within a red outer case
- Subject: The Valley from The Western Lands; AIDS; Social activism; collaboration; allegory; Discrimination against people with HIV/AIDS; urban art; social change
- Dimensions: Plate: 25.4 cm × 22.8 cm (10.0 in × 9.0 in); Sheet: 35.6 × 31.8 cm (14 × 12 1/2 in.); Portfolio: 41.6 × 36.8 × 6.7 cm (16 3/8 × 14 1/2 × 2 5/8 in.)
- Location: ≥1 public collections

Collaborators
- Proofed by: Maurice Payne, New York City
- Editioned by: Richard Spare, Wellington Studios, London
- Fabricator: James Currier, Newtown, Connecticut
- Publisher: George Mulder Fine Art, New York City
- Website: The Valley at haring.com

The Valley is a suite of etchings by Keith Haring, illustrating the eponymous final chapter from The Western Lands by William S. Burroughs, drawn in 1989 and published in 1990. It is an ominous allegorical depiction of the horror and chaos of the AIDS Crisis.

The suite comprises thirty-one sheets alongside a colophon sheet, within a black cloth-covered folio and presented in a red cloth-covered portfolio. There are sixteen etchings by Haring in black ink, accompanied by sixteen photo-etchings in red ink, of handwritten text by Burroughs (fifteen sheets each, with the final sheet shared).

Keith Haring tested positive for HIV in 1987 and had since developed Kaposi's sarcoma, a form of cancer that often accompanies AIDS, by the time these etchings were drawn in April 1989.

This was the last collaboration between Haring and Burroughs, as Haring died of the complications from AIDS on 16 February 1990, weeks after publication, age 31.

== Background and collaboration ==
Whilst a student at the School of Visual Arts, Haring discovered the Beat Generation of poets at the 1978 Nova Convention, Haring had been inspired by Burroughs use of language and literary techniques, such as the cut-up technique.

Both Keith Haring and William S. Burroughs were openly LGBTQ individuals (Haring was openly homosexual and Burroughs was openly bisexual), and their shared community and values had a profound impact on Haring's art. His work reflected a subversive and queer perspective, echoing Burroughs' own challenging approach to narrative and social norms. Their shared defiance of conventional standards, particularly with respect to sexuality, is a testament to the lasting influence of Burroughs on Haring's artistic expression.

Based on the final chapter The Valley, from Burroughs' penultimate novel The Western Lands, and the final novel in his Cities of the Red Night trilogy (1981–1987), published in 1987 by Viking Press. This story, about people living in a crevasse, knowing neither where they came from nor where they are going, is both absurd and relatable. The inhabitants suffering from an unnamed virus, unknowingly living under quarantine conveys a sense of desperate frustration.

In April 1989, Haring drew images for the portfolio onto sixteen copper plates in his New York studio, accompanying Burroughs’ text. Burroughs hand-copied his text in script, onto sixteen sheets of tracing paper, which were photo-etched onto 10 × 9 inch copper plates and printed in red ink. The works are presented in a red portfolio case.

Proofed by Maurice Payne and printed entirely by Richard Spare at his Wellington Studios in Charlton, London.

== Prints ==
=== Colophon ===
"The Valley" is a group of etchings by Keith Haring with text by William S. Burroughs. The portfolio consists of sixteen etchings drawn by the artist in April of 1989, in his New York studio. The images were proofed by Maurice Payne from 10" x 9" copper plates and printed in black ink.

The author copied the text by hand on sixteen sheets of tracing paper, which were photo-etched onto 10" x 9" copper plates and printed in red ink. The last page of the portfolio contains both text and image. There is a total of thirty-one sheets.

All the images are Copyright ©1990–2005 The Keith Haring Foundation. The text, also titled "The Valley", is a chapter from the author’s novel, The Western Lands, Copyright ©1987 William S. Burroughs. The chapter is reprinted by the arrangement with Viking Penguin, a division of Penguin Books USA Inc.

The fine art paper was created at Twinrocker Handmade Paper in Brookston, Indiana. The 14"x12 1/2" sheets are white, 160 lb. 100% cotton paper. The watermark contains the initials of the artist and author. The edition was hand-printed at Wellington Studios in London, and each copy is presented in a case constructed by James Currier of Newtown, Connecticut.

Each of the intaglio images has been signed by the artist. The last page of text has been signed by the author. The edition of eighty is numbered 1/80 to 80/80, with thirteen Artist’s Proofs numbered A.P. 1/13 to A.P. 13/13, four Hors Commerce numbered H.C. 1/4 to 4/4 and one Bon a Tirer.

The edition is published by George Mulder Fine Arts,

New York in February, 1990.

Haring signed each of the artist's fifteen sheets "K.Haring '89 ⊕" including the year and the artist's circled plus symbol. Burroughs signed the shared sheet which concludes the author's handwritten text across fifteen sheets.

=== Etchings ===
Illustrations and Text
Illustration Index	Text Index	Title	View at T K H Foundation	Object No.	Medium	Notes	Ref.
1	—	Untitled	View	art-work/192	†		
—	1	Untitled	View	—	‡		
2	—	Untitled	View	art-work/193	†		
—	2	Untitled	View	—	‡		
3	—	Untitled	View	art-work/194	†		
—	3	Untitled	View	—	‡		
4	—	Untitled	View	art-work/195	†		
—	4	Untitled	View	—	‡		
5	—	Untitled	View	art-work/200	†		
—	5	Untitled	View	—	‡		
6	—	Untitled	View	art-work/202	†		
—	6	Untitled	View	—	‡		
7	—	Untitled	View	art-work/204	†		
—	7	Untitled	View	—	‡		
8	—	Untitled	View	art-work/205	†		
—	8	Untitled	View	—	‡		
9	—	Untitled	View	art-work/206	†		
—	9	Untitled	View	—	‡		
10	—	Untitled	View	art-work/207	†		
—	10	Untitled	View	—	‡		
11	—	Untitled	View	art-work/212	†		
—	11	Untitled	View	—	‡		
12	—	Untitled	View	art-work/213	†		
—	12	Untitled	View	—	‡		
13	—	Untitled	View	art-work/214	†		
—	13	Untitled	View	—	‡		
14	—	Untitled	View	art-work/215	†		
—	14	Untitled	View	—	‡		
15	—	Untitled	View	art-work/216	†		
—	15	Untitled	View	—	‡		
16		Untitled	View	art-work/217	† ‡	Artwork en-texte	

† Soft-ground and hard-ground etchings in black ink

‡ Photo-etched in red ink

== Public collections ==
The complete series of eleven etchings is held in the permanent collections of:

- The Keith Haring Foundation, New York.

== Exhibitions ==
The complete suite of thirty-one sheets have featured in the following exhibitions:

17 February 1990 – February 1990: Keith Haring and William S. Burroughs: 'Apocalypse' and 'The Valley', Charles Lucien Gallery, 555 Broadway, New York City, New York, USA.

Keith Haring died on February 16, 1990, the day before the exhibition.

18 February 2006 – 6 August 2006: Keith Haring: Journey of the Radiant Baby, Reading Public Museum, Reading, Pennsylvania, USA.

'Exhibition co-curator Ron Roth examines Haring's ardent social activism and utilization of the potential of art to enlarge public support and involvement in a variety of charitable causes, one of the definitive contributions of Haring's work'.

17 November 2017 – 11 March 2018: Keith Haring: The End of the Line, Wainger Gallery, Cranbrook Art Museum, Bloomfield Hills, Michigan, USA.

'The End of The Line concentrates on the last years of Haring’s life, when his work and activism got intensely personal after being diagnosed with AIDS. The Cranbrook mural introduced stylistic shifts of intentional drips and blotches, but it also depicted characters he continued to explore in Apocalypse and The Valley, such as jesters, masks, skulls, martyrs, and other religious icons. Entrenched in thoughts and philosophies about the end of times, Haring’s later works have art historical kinship with the chaotic storytelling of Hieronymus Bosch and violent playfulness of his friend and contemporary Jean-Michel Basquiat. The ominous texts by Burroughs stationed alongside them complement the energy of Haring’s drawings, which have the frenzy of an artist trying to process life before its end'.

2 November 2018 – 12 January 2019: Keith Haring: Apocalypse: Collaborations with William S. Burroughs and Brion Gysin, Pace Prints, 521 West 26th Street Gallery, New York City, New York, USA.

'The Valley, on view in the side gallery, is a portfolio of thirty-one sheets, created based upon a chapter of text from Burroughs’ Western Lands. This story, about people living in a crevasse knowing neither where they came from nor where they were going, is both absurd and relatable. In April of 1989, Haring drew images for the portfolio onto copper plates in his studio, accompanying Burroughs’ text. Burroughs hand-copied his text in script, onto sixteen sheets of tracing paper, which were photo-etched onto 10 x 9 inch copper plates and printed in red ink. The works are beautifully presented in a red portfolio case. This was the last collaboration the two did, as Haring died of AIDS in February of 1990'.

'Archival materials on display include correspondence between the artists, as well as photographs, announcements and an inscribed copy of Western Lands. Haring’s own hand-written journal, citing days with Burroughs and Gysin, show the background and relationships from which these works were created. All materials are from the Keith Haring Foundation Archive'.

== Reception ==
"The Valley, Haring’s collaborative portfolio with William Burroughs from 1989, reveals a more disturbing vision of human nature." "These are the images of a man grappling with his own untimely decline, an end from which no flock of angels or radiant babies could save him." — Eileen G’Sell, Hyperallergic

== See also ==
Haring etchings
- Untitled Series (with Sean Kalish)

Haring artworks about epidemics

- Todos Juntos Podemos Parar el SIDA
- Crack is Wack

Haring collaborations with Burroughs

- Apocalypse

Themes

- The Valley from The Western Lands by William S. Burroughs
- AIDS
- AIDS epidemic
- HIV/AIDS in the United States
- Allegory
- Epidemic
- Postmodern literature

Related movements

- Art of the AIDS Crisis
- Artivism
- Protest art

Related works

- Silence = Death (film)
- Silence=Death Project
