= Holly Harp =

American fashion designer (1939–1995)

- Born: Helen Roberta Speller; 24 October 1935; Buffalo, New York
- Died: 24 April 1995 (aged 59); Cedars Sinai Hospital, Los Angeles, California
- Education: North Texas State University
- Years active: 1968–1995
- Label: Holly's Harp
- Spouse: James "Jim" Harp (m. 1965; div. 1981)
- Partner: Mark Buckman
- Children: 1
- Awards: Distinguished Alumnus from University of North Texas (1979)

Helen Roberta Speller (also known as Holly Harp) (24 October 1939 – 24 April 1995) was an American fashion designer based in Los Angeles known for her nostalgic designs and style reminiscent of the hippie era.

== Life ==
Born as Helen Roberta Speller on October 24, 1939 in Buffalo, New York, Holly Harp studied art and costume design at North Texas State University, where she met her husband, James "Jim" Harp, whom she married in 1965 and would later divorce in 1981. The Harps stayed in business together, with Jim serving as sales director starting in 1986. Harp attended night classes to learn pattern making. They had a son, Thomas "Tommy/Tom" Harp. Harp died of ovarian cancer on April 24, 1995 at the Cedars Sinai Hospital in Los Angeles. She also had breast cancer. Her mother predeceased her, dying when Harp was nine years old. Harp was survived by her ex-husband, son, fiancé, and siblings: sisters Elizabeth Horn and Sarah Bozzola, and brother Thomas Speller Jr.

== Work ==
Harp's work consisted of materials including nylon, silk, rayon, jersey, and chiffon. The style of her work ranged from a hippie, psychedelic style to a romantic, fantasy inspired style. She began work upcycling fabrics and thrifting to make ready-made clothes and doing custom orders. She designed evening wear, and prized theatrics as well as the happiness and confidence of her clients. She considered herself to work with nostalgia, and Harp's fiancé at the time of her death, Mark Buckman, said that she had described her work as "counterculturalist". Geraldine Stutz is credited with introducing Harp to a wider audience as the president of Henri Bendel.

In 1968, Harp opened "Holly's Harp", a boutique on the Sunset Strip. Her work was sold on both coasts, from her store in Los Angeles to stores on Fifth Avenue, such as the stores Henri Bendel, Bergdorf Goodman, and Neiman Marcus. After her collection's appearance at Henri Bendel in 1972, she began manufacturing herself. In 1973, Harp filed for a patent under the name "Holly's Harp and Design" under "Holly's Harp Inc". Harp was one of the designers who took over the work from designer Anne Klein after her death in 1974. In 1978, clothes from her factory were shipped to ninety stores. In 1986, her designs at Henri Bendel sold for $650 to $1,350. The boutique Holly's Harp closed in 1986, though she continued to work at her studio in Culver City until her death in 1995. After her diagnosis of breast cancer, Harp claimed her assistant Amy Michelson as the designer to continue her line. In 1994, Harp's jacket with two shirts retailed for $3,185. The firm "Holly's Harp" was inherited by her son and continued operations, including the creation of a new clothing line titled "HH by Amy Michelson” and a bridal line “Amy Michelson Wedding“ as well as the “Amy Michelson for Holly Harp” collection, until closing in 1999 at a stable volume of business of roughly $2.5 million.

Her work was worn by celebrities such as Janis Joplin, Liza Minnelli, Diana Ross, Grace Slick, Barbra Streisand, and Jane Fonda. She was the stylist for Stevie Nicks, and created her stage persona. She was additionally head costume designer on movies such as Sleeper and The Turning Point, and her work appeared in the movie Cabaret. She was credited as the inspiration for clothes by fashion brands Gucci and Marc Jacobs by Cameron Silver in June 2002.

Her activity in the Los Angeles community extended to other artists and causes. She designed clothes for Judy Chicago to paint on for International Festival of the Arts in New York, held a fundraiser with Elyse Grinstein to raise money for Chicago's art project "The Dinner Party" in 1990 which Harp had also worked with Chicago on, and donated fabrics to Chicago's projects "Creation of the World". Harp did a show at a luncheon for the Cedars Sinai Hospital, and delivered meals to AIDs patients during protests.

== Awards and collections ==
Her work was nominated twice for the Coty Awards, and nominated for an award at the Los Angeles Woman's Building Annual Vesta Awards ceremony in 1990. She won the Distinguished Alumnus award in 1979 from her alma mater, University of North Texas.

Harp's work is stored in collections at the MET, the Fashion Institute of Design & Merchandising Museum, the Oakland Museum of California, the Boston Museum of Fine Arts, the Philadelphia Museum of Art, and Thomas Jefferson University.
