= United States and the United Nations Convention on the Law of the Sea =

American involvement in drafting but non-ratification

Parties Parties, dually represented by the European Union Signatories Non-parties

The United States was among the nations that participated in the third United Nations Conference on the Law of the Sea, which took place from 1974 through 1982 and resulted in the international treaty known as the United Nations Convention on the Law of the Sea (UNCLOS). The United States also participated in the subsequent negotiations of modifications to Part XI of the treaty from 1990 to 1994. Although the United States signed and recognized the UNCLOS as a codification of customary international law in 1994, it has not ratified it. The UNCLOS came into force in 1994.

UNCLOS, also called the Law of the Sea Convention or the Law of the Sea Treaty, defines the rights and responsibilities of nations in their use of the world's oceans; it establishes guidelines for businesses, the environment, and the management of marine natural resources. To date, 168 countries and the European Union have joined the Convention.

== History ==
=== UNCLOS III ===
Maritime Zones under International Law

The Third United Nations Conference on the Law of the Sea (UNCLOS III) was convened from June to August in Caracas, Venezuela in 1974. The most significant issues which were covered were setting limits, navigation, archipelagic status and transit regimes, exclusive economic zones (EEZs), continental shelf jurisdiction, deep seabed mining, the exploitation regime, protection of the marine environment, scientific research, and settlement of maritime boundary disputes. With more than 160 nations participating, Roger Rufe, president of the Ocean Conservancy, said to the U.S. senate that: "the Conference continued until its final meeting in late 1982, at which time the final act was signed and the Convention was opened for signature. As time went on, it became clear that the United States, among other developed states, was not willing to agree to Part XI of the Convention concerning deep seabed portions and mining of potentially valuable metals."

The United States objected to Part XI of the Convention on several grounds, arguing that the treaty was unfavorable to American economic and security interests. The U.S. claimed that the provisions of the treaty were not free-market friendly and were designed to favor the economic systems of the Communist states. The U.S. also argued that the International Seabed Authority established by the Convention might become a bloated and expensive bureaucracy, due to a combination of large revenues and insufficient control over what the revenues could be used for.

The United States accepted all but Part XI as customary international law. In March 1983 President Ronald Reagan, through Proclamation No. 5030, claimed a 200-mile exclusive economic zone. In December 1988 President Reagan, through Proclamation No. 5928, extended U.S. territorial waters from three nautical miles to twelve nautical miles for national security purposes. However a legal opinion from the Justice Department questioned the President's constitutional authority to extend sovereignty as Congress has the power to make laws concerning the territory belonging to the United States under the U.S. Constitution. In any event, Congress needs to pass laws defining if the extended waters, including oil and mineral rights, are under State or Federal control.

=== Revision of the UNCLOS ===
From 1983 to 1990, the United States attempted to establish an alternative regime for exploitation of the minerals of the deep seabed. An agreement was made with other seabed mining nations and licenses were granted to four international consortia. Concurrently, the Preparatory Commission was established to prepare for the eventual coming into force of the Convention-recognized claims by applicants, sponsored by signatories of the Convention. Overlaps between the two groups were resolved, but a decline in the demand for minerals from the seabed made the seabed regime significantly less relevant. In addition, the decline of Socialism and the fall of Communism in the late 1980s had removed much of the support for some of the more contentious Part XI provisions.

In 1990, consultations were begun between signatories and non-signatories (including the United States) over the possibility of modifying the Convention to allow the industrialized countries to join the Convention. The resulting 1994 Agreement on Implementation was adopted as a binding international Convention. It mandated that key articles, including those on limitation of seabed production and mandatory technology transfer, would not be applied, that the United States, if it became a member, would be guaranteed a seat on the Council of the International Seabed Authority, and finally, that voting would be done in groups, with each group able to block decisions on substantive matters. The 1994 Agreement also established a Finance Committee that would originate the financial decisions of the Authority, to which the largest donors would automatically be members and in which decisions would be made by consensus.

Thus, modifications to that provision were negotiated, and an amending agreement was finalized in July 1994. The U.S. signed the Agreement in 1994 and now recognizes the Convention as general international law, but has not ratified it at this time. UNCLOS entered into force in November 1994 with the requisite sixty ratifications.

=== Latest developments ===
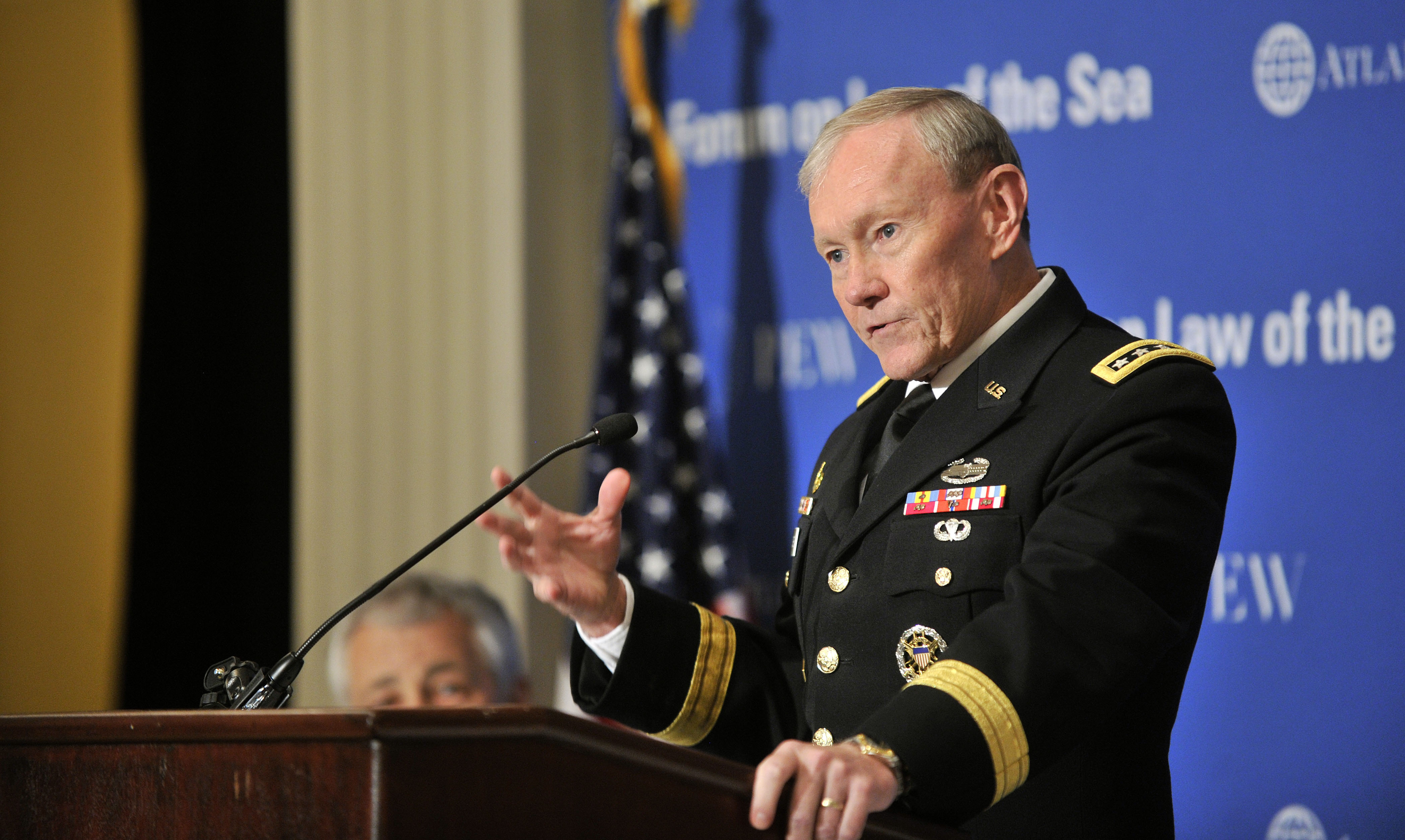
Chairman of the Joint Chiefs of Staff Gen. Martin E. Dempsey U.S Army at the Forum on the Law of the Sea Convention held in Washington D.C., May 9, 2012

On April 24, 2004 Jeane Kirkpatrick (Reagan Administration United Nations Ambassador 1981–1985), testified against United States ratification of the treaty before the Senate Armed Services Committee, in which she argued that "Viewed from the perspective of U.S. interests and Reagan Administration principles, it was a bad bargain," and that "its ratification will diminish our capacity for self-government, including, ultimately, our capacity for self-defense."

On April 11, 2006, the 5-Member UNCLOS Annex VII Arbitral Tribunal, presided over by H.E. Judge Stephen M. Schwebel, rendered after two years of international judicial proceedings, the landmark Barbados/Trinidad and Tobago Award, which resolved the maritime boundary delimitation (in the East, Central and West sectors) to satisfaction of both Parties and committed Barbados and Trinidad and Tobago to resolve their fisheries dispute by means of concluding a new Fisheries Agreement.

On May 15, 2007, U.S. President George W. Bush announced that he had urged the Senate to approve UNCLOS.

On September 20, 2007, an Arbitral Tribunal constituted under UNCLOS issued its decision on a longstanding maritime boundary dispute between Guyana and Suriname, which contained a ruling blaming both nations for violating treaty obligations.

On October 31, 2007, the Senate Foreign Relations Committee voted 17–4 to send the treaty to the full U.S. Senate for a vote.

On January 13, 2009, speaking at her Senate confirmation hearing as nominee for U.S. secretary of state, Senator Hillary Clinton said that ratification of the Law of the Sea Treaty would be a priority for her.

On May 23, 2012, Secretary of State Hillary Clinton testified before the U.S. Senate Committee on Foreign Relations and argued for the ratification of the treaty. During the same hearing, Secretary of Defense Leon Panetta and Joint Chiefs of Staff Chairman General Martin Dempsey also urged swift ratification of the Law of the Sea Treaty.

On June 14, 2012, the U.S. Senate Committee on Foreign Relations held the so-called "24 Star" hearing, featuring six four-star generals and admirals representing every branch of the U.S. Armed Forces. Each witness, including the Vice Chairman of the Joint Chiefs of Staff; Chief of Naval Operations; Commandant of the Coast Guard; Commander of U.S. Transportation Command; Commander of U.S. Northern Command; and Commander of the U.S. Pacific Command, testified in favor of ratifying the treaty.

On June 28, 2012, the U.S. Chamber of Commerce, the American Petroleum Institute (API), the National Association of Manufacturers (NAM) and Verizon Communications testified before the U.S. Senate Committee on Foreign Relations that the Law of the Sea Treaty would strengthen the U.S. economy and help create American jobs.

On July 16, 2012, 34 Republican senators signed a letter to U.S. Senate Foreign Relations Committee Chairman John Kerry pledging to vote against the treaty. Because treaty ratification in the U.S. requires 2/3 of the United States Senate to vote for approval, the 34 signatories are enough to stop treaty ratification. However, Senator Lisa Murkowski later said that the vote to deny passage in 2012 was purely political and that the U.S. Chamber of Commerce would deliver enough Republican votes for passage in the lame-duck session.

As of 2026, the United States has not ratified UNCLOS.

== Debate ==
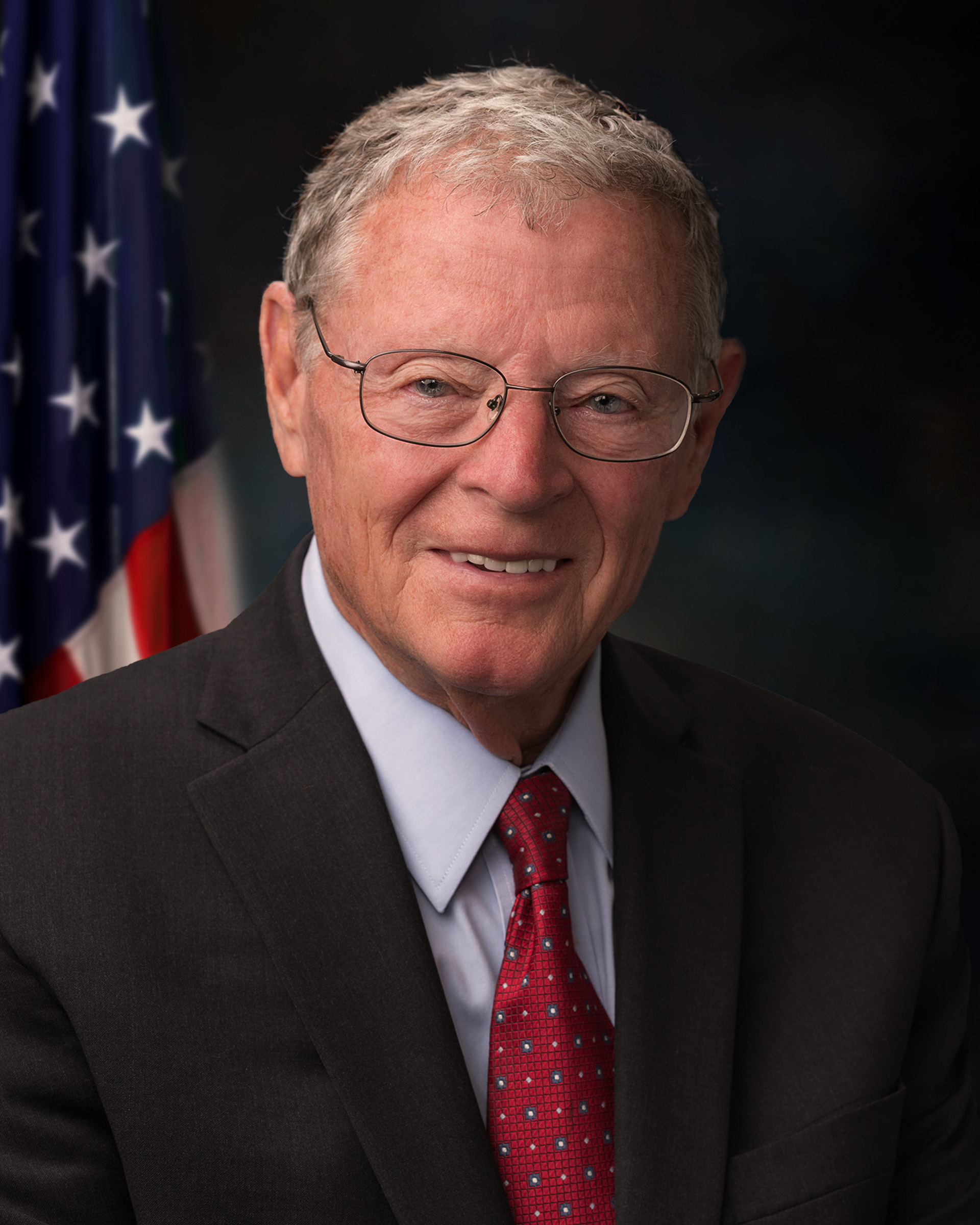
Jim Inhofe

In the United States there has been vigorous debate over the ratification of the treaty, with criticism coming mainly from political conservatives. In 2012, a group of Republican senators led by Jim Inhofe of Oklahoma and Jim DeMint of South Carolina blocked American ratification of the Convention, claiming that it would infringe on U.S. sovereignty. Other commentators have argued that although the George W. Bush administration, the Pentagon and the Senate Foreign Relations Committee favored ratification, other U.S. congressional committees possessing oversight jurisdiction have yet to undertake an open, transparent and substantive public review of this most complex treaty's significant environmental regulatory and judicial enforcement provisions, their relationship to the provisions of other multilateral environmental treaties, and the need to amend U.S. federal environmental, wildlife, chemicals and offshore drilling laws and/or regulations in order to implement the international legal obligations the U.S. would assume upon ratification of UNCLOS.

== See also ==
- United Nations Convention on the Law of the Sea
- International Tribunal for the Law of the Sea
- Maritime Security Regimes
- Territorial waters
- United States "Freedom of Navigation" program
- U.S. ratification of the Convention on the Rights of the Child
