= Maritime Security Regimes =

Security portions of customary maritime law

Maritime Security Regimes are codes and conventions of behavior agreed upon by coastal states to provide a degree of security within territorial waters and on the high seas.

== Purpose ==
One of the best known International Maritime Regimes is the United Nations Convention on the Law of the Sea, or UNCLOS. While UNCLOS is only one of many regimes, or sets of rules, laws, codes and conventions that have been created to regulate the activities of private, commercial and military users of our seas and oceans, it provides the legal framework for further maritime security cooperation. Most maritime regimes, including UNCLOS, have been created through the United Nations International Maritime Organization (IMO) in consultation with its member states, and refer to navigation, resource allocation and ownership, prevention of pollution and environmental protection. The United States has not yet ratified UNCLOS (see United States non-ratification of the UNCLOS) but it does adhere to its conventions, and has been the driving force behind other maritime security initiatives, including PSI, CSI, ISPS Code and counter-piracy agreements to address piracy against commercial shipping in the Gulf of Aden, Horn of Africa region. The United States has also led attempts to expand current bilateral maritime policing, counter narcotics trafficking agreements, whereby regional states in the Caribbean participate in a Caribbean Regional Maritime Agreement (CRA) - (long name: Agreement Concerning Co-operation in Suppressing Illicit Maritime and Air Trafficking in Narcotic Drugs and Psychotropic Substances in the Caribbean Area).

Where maritime security regimes can differ from other maritime regimes, is that they are created to enable effective policing beyond the jurisdictional constraints of the territorial sea, which ranges from 3 nautical miles (5.6 km) to 12 nautical miles (22 km) from the high-water mark of a coastal state (see UNCLOS).

Complications arise when a navy, coast guard, coastwatch, maritime police force, or other agency wishes to intercept (or 'interdict') vessels suspected of carrying out illegal activities, such as piracy against ships, smuggling or there is potential for an act of terrorism. If a suspect vessel is registered, or 'flagged', with a state other than the state of the pursuing authorities, then in most cases the pursuing authorities must gain the permission of the 'flag' state prior to boarding. If the suspect vessel crosses into the territorial waters of another state, possibly a third state, which is not the home state of the pursuing authorities, then permission must be sought from the territorial state prior to intercepting or boarding.

However, if a prior agreement has been arranged with one or more coastal states, then this can simplify and speed up the process and can make the difference between suspects being detained or not. If several states within a maritime region (such as the Caribbean Sea or Southeast Asia) can come to agreement on 'hot pursuit' and boarding of suspect vessels, then this will reduce time that must otherwise be spent seeking permission.

UNCLOS, Article 111 states that: "The hot pursuit of a foreign ship may be undertaken when the competent authorities of the coastal State have good reason to believe that the ship has violated the law and regulations of that State. Such pursuit must be commenced when the foreign ship or one of its boats is within the internal waters, the archipelagic waters, the territorial sea, or the contiguous zone if the pursuit has not been interrupted.....The right of hot pursuit ceases as soon as the ship pursued enters the territorial sea of its own State or of a third State."

== Theory ==
While there is a broad school of thought and considerable academic literature on 'regimes' (see Regime theory), less is known about Maritime Security Regimes as an academic field, or set of theories in its own right. Another related area that requires further research is Regional Maritime Security Regimes, for while there do exist international regimes such as UNCLOS (1988), SUA (1988), ISPS code (2004) there is a trend toward regionalism in maritime security, and exclusion of a strong hegemony to administer it. The CRA is an example of a comprehensive multilateral regional maritime agreement. the CRA arose out of a need to respond to the growing prevalence of drug trafficking through the Caribbean Sea. Initially bi-lateral agreements between Caribbean states sought to address the delays that occurred when suspects fled into the territorial sea and beyond the jurisdiction of the United States Coast Guard (USCG). These comprehensive agreements sought, among other things, to allow law enforcement officers of one state to be 'sea-rider' LEDETS aboard vessels of the territorial states to reduce lengthy permission-seeking processes. The CRA refers to existing international convention found within the United Nations Convention Against Illicit Traffic in Narcotic Drugs and Psychotropic Substances (1988). Article 17 of the UN Drugs Convention states:

"1. The Parties [states] shall co-operate to the fullest extent possible to suppress illicit traffic by sea, in conformity with the international law of the sea."

== History ==
Maritime Security in its commercial and military forms has been the primary reason for Naval presence in areas with high shipping traffic but low levels of policing. Notable areas have historically included the Caribbean Sea, and currently include piracy on the West Coast of Africa Nigeria, the East Coast of Africa, particularly the Horn of Africa, Gulf of Aden and Somalian Coast; the South China Sea, and until 2007, Southeast Asia's Strait of Malacca and Singapore Strait. Security Regimes were developed during the Cold War, with the SALT I and SALT II but maritime regimes that protect the rights and free passage of commercial and other maritime traffic have been under development since colonial powers sought to protect resources and trade routes from South and Southeast Asia to Europe. Academic literature on Maritime Security Regimes is minimal, although material relating to regional maritime policing, and anti-piracy agreements such as UN Security Resolutions 1816 (2008) and 1846 (2008) suggest this is increasingly significant area of research.

== List of regimes ==
- SUA – Convention for the Suppression of Unlawful Acts Against the Safety of Maritime Navigation (1988)
- UNCLOS – United Nations Convention on the Law of the Sea (1988/92)
- PSI – Proliferation Security Initiative – not so much a regime as a set of principles.
- ISPS Code – International Ship and Port Facility Security Code
- SARPSCO – The South Asia Regional Port Security Cooperative (2008)
- Agreement Concerning Co-operation in Suppressing Illicit Maritime and Air Trafficking in Narcotic Drugs and Psychotropic Substances in the Caribbean Area

== See also ==
- International Maritime Organization
- International regime
- Malaysian Maritime Enforcement Agency
- Maritime Security (USCG)
- Piracy
- Police Coast Guard
- Regime theory
- Shipping
- United Nations Convention on the Law of the Sea
