= Geraldine Stutz =

American businesswoman

Geraldine Stutz (August 5, 1924 – April 8, 2005) was an American businesswoman. She was one of the first female executives of a retail establishment. Stutz was appointed president of Henri Bendel in 1957, serving for 29 years until stepping down in 1986.

== Biography ==
She was born in Chicago, Illinois. Her parents were Anthony H. and Estelle Tully Stutz. She had a younger sister.

At first, she aspired to be an actress. She studied drama at Mundelein College before changing her mind: Although still attached to a theater-related career, she began an interest in journalism. She moved to New York and became a fashion editor for movie magazines. In 1947, she was recruited as an associate fashion editor for Glamour magazine, where she wrote about shoes. She went on to work for I. Miller Shoes.

In 1957, she was selected to head an ailing Henri Bendel and was given three years to make it profitable. By 1964, Henry Bendel had experienced a 10 percent increase in sales, the largest increase in its history. By 1967, it had doubled its sale. In 1967, with financing from an international consortium, Stutz purchased Bendel from Genesco for 8 million dollars, becoming its managing partner and 30 percent owner.

The New York Times credits her with having "transformed Henri Bendel from a "carriage trade" retailer in decline into a chic emporium of designer brands in the 1960s" and facilitated the rise of Stephen Burrows, Perry Ellis, Jean Muir, Sonia Rykiel, Carlos Falchi, Mary McFadden, Holly Harp and Ralph Lauren among others.

Stutz was named one of the best dressed women in the Fashion Industry in 1959, 1963, 1964. In 1965, she was elected to the Fashion Industry Hall of Fame. Stutz was once asked: "What is the difference between mere fashion and true style?" Her answer was: "Fashion says 'Me too', and style says 'Only me'." She thought her best talent was as a finder and nourisher of talents, "I help people to perform more bravely than they think they can."

Stutz was married to British painter David Gibbs from 1965 to 1977.

After assembling a group of investors, Stutz purchased the business from Genesco in 1980. She sold her stake five years later and worked as a publisher for Random House, where she oversaw books about Elsie de Wolfe and Andy Warhol. Through the GSG Group, a practice she established in 1993, she also kept consulting with retailers and designers.

She died in her home on the Upper East Side of Manhattan on April 8, 2005.
