= Stephen Burrows (designer) =

American fashion designer

- Born: September 15, 1943 (age 82); Newark, New Jersey, U.S.
- Education: Fashion Institute of Technology
- Occupation: Fashion Designer
- Years active: 1966–present

Stephen Burrows (born September 15, 1943) is an American fashion designer based in New York City. Burrows studied at Fashion Institute of Technology, then began work in the New York City's Garment Center, alternately managing his own businesses and working closely with luxury department store Henri Bendel. He is known for being one of the first African-American fashion designers to sell internationally and develop a mainstream, high-fashion clientele. His garments, known for their bright colors and "lettuce hem" curly-edges, became an integral part of the "Fun City" New York City disco-dancing scene of the 1970s.

== Early life ==
Burrows was born in Newark, New Jersey on September 15, 1943. Born to parents Octavia Pennington and Gerald Burrows, he was raised by his mother, and his maternal grandmother, Beatrice Pennington Banks Simmons. Fascinated with his grandmother's zigzag sewing machine, he learned to sew early. He made his first garment for a friend's doll when he was eight years old.

As a high school student, Burrows took dance lessons and loved the mambo. He began heading to Manhattan on Sundays to dance at the Palladium night club, and began sketching dresses he wanted for his partners. When he graduated from Newark Arts High School, he first enrolled at the Philadelphia Museum College of Art, intending to be an art teacher.

Inspired by dress forms he came across during a tour of the college, he transferred to New York City's Fashion Institute of Technology (FIT) where he met a fellow student, Betty Davis, who became his friend and an early muse. He found his studies frustrating, since FIT professors taught a set of basic draping rules that Burrows had no patience with. Even then he had established his spontaneous style of cutting at all angles, stretching edges off grain, and draping as he went. Nonetheless, he graduated in 1966.

== Fashion career ==
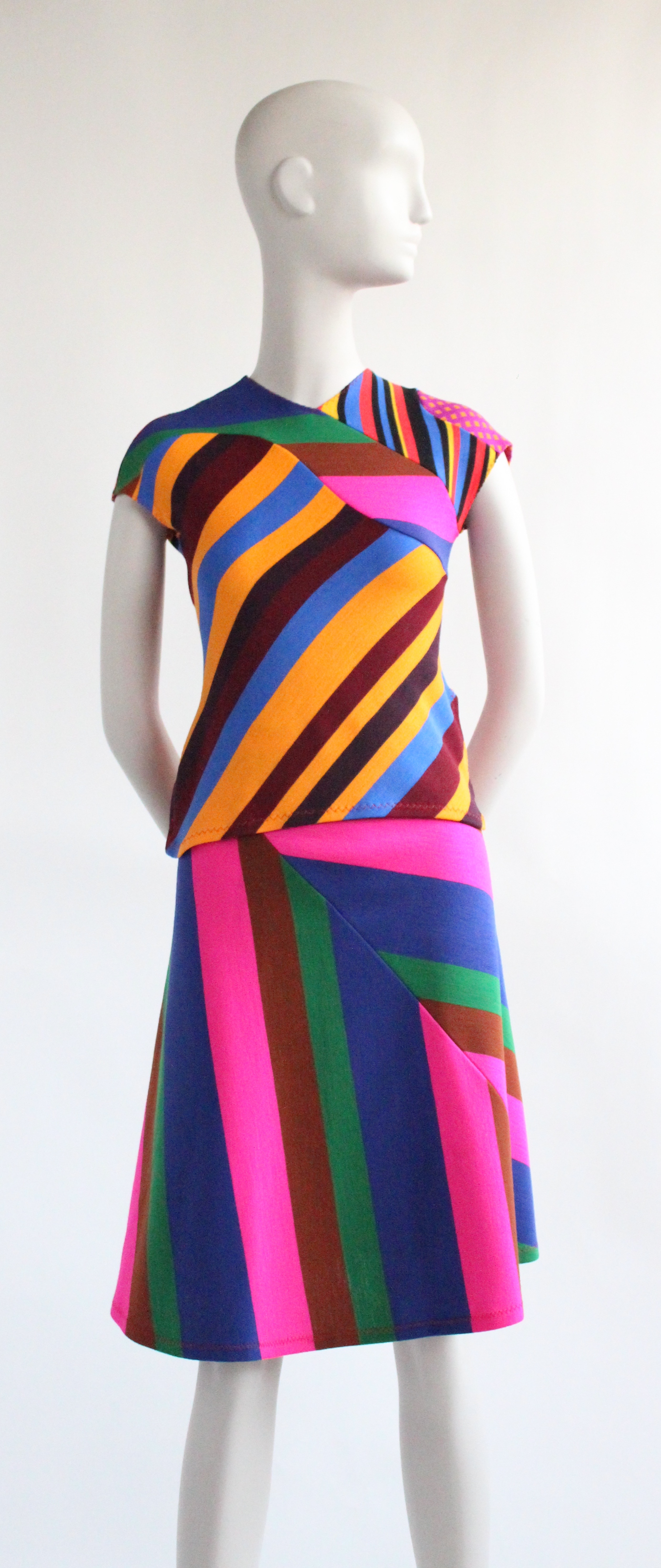
Stephen Burrows top & skirt, Fall/ Winter 1971. Adnan Ege Kutay Collection

Burrows began his working career with a job at blouse manufacturer, Weber Originals. Gradually his work was picked up by small shops, and in 1968 he began working with Andy Warhol and his entourage at Max's Kansas City and selling his clothing across the street at his O Boutique on Park Avenue South. Burrows workshop was in the basement of the boutique on Park Avenue South. His team consisted of his friends, leatherwear designer Bobby Breslau, former FIT classmate William Hill as the patternmaker, and fabric designer Hector Torres. Burrows' clothes were described as the fashion embodiment of the electric sexuality of this era. The women who wore his clothes gave off an aura of frantically creative days and wild nights filled with disco music and glamorous people.

The O Boutique closed in the spring of 1970. Burrows and his partner Roz Rubenstein created a ready-to-wear collection that was sold to the luxury department store Bonwit Teller. As a former student of FIT, there was a desire amongst his classmates to sell their lines at the famous retailer Henri Bendel. When Burrows was introduced to Geraldine Stutz, Bendel's owner, she loved the coat he wore to meet her so much that she gave him an in-store boutique at Henri Bendel on West 57th Street in 1970. Fashion model Pat Cleveland was a fitting model for Burrows at Bendel's studio.

Stephen designed the outfits for The Supremes 1971 concert in Central Park, along with stylizing the three women. In the fall of 1973, Burrows' first lingerie/sleepwear collection, called "Stevies" was introduced at Henri Bendel's, Bonwit Teller, Lord & Taylor, and Bloomingdales, as well as stores in Chicago, San Francisco, and elsewhere.

Burrows was one of the five American fashion designers chosen to showcase their work at the historical fashion show billed as divertissement à Vèrsailles, held on November 28, 1973. This event has come to be known as The Battle of Versailles Fashion Show. He was the youngest of the American designers to show a collection at the show by more than a decade.

In 1975, Jaclyn Smith of Charlie's Angels fame appeared in a commercial for Burrows' perfume Stephen B.. Three years later fellow "Angel" Farrah Fawcett wore his gold chainmail dress to the Academy Awards where she was a presenter. In February 1981, Brooke Shields, at age 15, appeared on the cover of Cosmopolitan magazine wearing Stephen Burrows. Other women who loved his clothes included Barbra Streisand, Cher, The Supremes, Bette Midler, and Jerry Hall.

In May 2006, the Council of Fashion Designers of America honored Burrows with "The Board of Directors Special Tribute." Around the same time, Burrows was invited by the Chambre Syndicale de la Mode to return to Paris to present his Spring/Summer 2007 Collection in the Carousel de Louvre. In addition to "Stephen Burrows World", Burrows expanded his company to include a number of labels drawn from various points of inspiration. "S by Burrows" was created for a venture with Home Shopping Europe (HSN) in Munich, Germany, while "Everyday Girl" was inspired by Anna Cleveland, daughter to muse and model Pat Cleveland, and "SB73", a cut and sew knit line that was developed based on Burrows' hallmark, color-blocked creations of the seventies.

First Lady Michelle Obama wore a Burrows Jersey pantsuit to an event in Washington, D.C. of which Vogue Magazine wrote, "It was a wonderful acknowledgement of Burrows, one of the great African-American designers and a Harlem resident known for his inventive cuts and bias technique."

== Awards ==
- Coty Award, American Fashion Critics award ("Winnie"), 1973
- Coty Award, American Fashion Critics special award (lingerie), 1974
- Coty Award, American Fashion Critics award ("Winnie"), 1977
- Council of American Fashion Critics award, 1975
- Knitted Textile Association Crystal Ball award, 1975
- Bronze plaque on the Fashion Walk of Fame, 2002
- Council of Fashion Designers of America Board of Directors' Special Tribute Award, 2006
- Key to the City of Newark, New Jersey, 2016 and many more ig

== Retrospectives and tributes ==
Burrows’ work as a fashion designer has been the subject of a series of retrospectives: in "1940–1970's Cut and Style" at New York's Fashion Institute of Technology; "The 1970s" at The Tribute Gallery in New York, and in "Back to Black: Art, Cinema, and the Racial Imaginary" at Whitechapel Gallery in London in June 2005.

In 2013, the Museum of the City of New York mounted the first major examination of Burrows' work in "Stephen Burrows: When Fashion Danced" with an accompanying catalog.
