= Carlos Falchi =

Brazilian-born American designer

Carlos Falchi (September 26, 1944 – March 27, 2015) was a Brazilian-born American handbag and accessories designer known for his patchwork designs. He has won awards for accessory design, and his accessories have appeared in several TV shows and movies. His business generates about $100 million a year in retail sales.

== Background and education ==
Falchi began his career in 1970s Greenwich Village, New York City. He worked as a busboy at Max's Kansas City while developing his designs; at one point his neighbor was Jimi Hendrix. His clientele were originally rockers and jazz artists.

== Bendels ==
Retailer Geraldine Stutz, of Henri Bendel stores, gave Falchi one of his early breaks. His designs became fashionable and he rose to early success.

== Materials ==
Falchi's bags often use skins such as python, alligator and ostrich and are soft and unstructured.

== Market venues ==
His main collection tends to be sold at upscale department stores for prices ranging from $1,500 to up to $5,000. In 2009, American discount retailer Target contracted with Falchi to produce a line of ten lower priced bags, using synthetic materials, that were sold at Target stores in November and December 2009.

== Personal ==
Falchi was married to his first wife Mary LaMosse, from Minneapolis, Minnesota, in the early 70s and later divorced. He was married 25 years to his wife, Missy, whom he met while she was working for the special events office in a Neiman Marcus in Dallas. They have two daughters: Kate, who is a designer with her father's company, and Juliet, who works for Estée Lauder.
