= Joan Williams (artist) =

Welsh artist, printmaker, watercolourist and teacher

Joan Williams RE RWS
- Born: 1922; Pontypridd, Glamorgan, Wales
- Died: 2002 (aged 79–80); Borough Green, Kent, England
- Education: High Wycombe School of Art; Royal College of Art; Central School of Art
- Known for: Printmaking; watercolour; teaching
- Elected: ARE; RE; ARWS (1971); RWS (1982); PmC
- Website: Joan Williams – Art UK

Joan Williams RE RWS (1922–2002) was a Welsh artist, printmaker, watercolourist and teacher, who found inspiration from bleak moorland, marshes, outcrops of rocks & long empty foreshores.

Born in Pontypridd, Glamorgan. Williams attended High Wycombe School of Art, the Royal College of Art and then the Central School of Art.

Head of printmaking at Maidstone College of Art where, amongst others, she taught Richard Spare (1971–74) and Tracey Emin (1983–86), also teaching at Medway College of Art and Shusta College, California.

- Printmakers Council (PmC)
- Royal Society of Painter-Printmakers (RE)
- Royal Watercolour Society (RWS)

Illustrated books for Oxford University Press. Living in High Wycombe, Buckinghamshire, and Wateringbury, Kent.

== Exhibitions ==
=== Invited artist ===
- Ljubljana, Yugoslavia (1971)
- West Germany (1972–74)
- Épinal, France (1975)
- Biella, Italy (1980)

=== Group ===
- 18 Royal Academy Summer Exhibitions, London, United Kingdom (1945, 1967–68, 1970–79, 1982–84, 1986, 1988)

=== Solo ===
- The Richard Bradley Atelier, Norfolk, United Kingdom (1971)
- Newport Art Gallery, United Kingdom (1976)
- Portland State University, Oregon, United States (1980)

== Public Collections ==
Many regional public galleries in Britain hold Williams' work.

- Arts Council Collection
- Aberystwyth University School of Art Museums and Galleries
- The Women's Art Collection (WAC), Murray Edwards College, University of Cambridge
- Government Art Collection
- Metropole Art Collection, Folkestone
