= We the Youth (Keith Haring) =

Mural by Keith Haring in Philadelphia, Pennsylvania

Coordinates: 39.938°N 75.180°W

- The mural in 2024
- Artist: Keith Haring
- Year: 1987
- Movement: Pop Art
- Location: Philadelphia
- Owner: Private homeowner, Mural Arts Program of Philadelphia

We the Youth is a 1987 mural by Keith Haring covering the west face of a private rowhouse in the Point Breeze neighborhood of Philadelphia, Pennsylvania. It was painted during a three-day workshop on 1, 2 and 3 September 1987. It is the only of Haring's collaborative public murals to remain in its original location. The mural was intended as a temporary placeholder until new row houses would eventually cover the wall of the mural.

== Description ==
We the Youth is two stories high and is continuous across three sections of the wall, including the front and back half of the rowhouse as well as a section of the fence of the private backyard.

The mural depicts dancing figures outlined in black on a white background. The outlines of the figures are filled in with blue, yellow, red and green, sometimes with a solid color and sometimes with patterns and symbols. The northmost section of the mural, painted on a fence, contains the words "We the Youth: City Kids of Phila + NYC". Haring's initials and the date are located at the bottom right of the mural.

== Historical Information ==
=== Conception ===
We the Youth was painted to commemorate the bicentennial of the United States Constitution and the title plays on the phrase "We the people" from the preamble of the document. It was a pro bono collaboration between Haring, CityKids of New York and Brandywine Workshop in Philadelphia. Haring worked alongside a group of fourteen high school students from New York and Philadelphia as well as with the artists Clarence Wood, Gilberto Wilson, and Jose Seabourne. Mykul Tronn, one of the participating art students, said of the mural:

The picture doesn't actually say much about the Constitution, but bringing people from all different backgrounds and all different places ... to work on this mural is doing something unified, and that has to do with the constitution.

The mural was originally intended as a temporary placeholder until a new rowhouse was built on the empty lot.

=== Restorations ===
Mural Arts Philadelphia first attempted to restore the mural in 2000, though it was "little more than a light touch-up, which quickly faded". A full restoration was conducted in 2013, in partnership with the Mural Arts Restoration Program, after the property was purchased by a new owner. Of the US$40,000 needed for the restoration, US$30,000 was given by the Keith Haring Foundation.

Mural Arts Philadelphia hired Kim Alsbrooks and a small team of artists and conservators to conduct the restoration. Restoration involved cleaning the mural surface, filling in losses of paint, brightening the colors, replacing the flashing and repairing structural damage. The techniques used are expected to stabilize the mural for another 30 years. The garden in front of the mural was re-landscaped by LoFurno and is now owned by the Neighborhood Gardens Trust.
