= Anthony Dyson (artist) =

English artist (1931–2023)

- Born: 1931
- Died: 2023 (aged 91–92)
- Education: Blackburn School of Art (Printmaking); Leeds College of Art (Education); Birkbeck College, University of London (Art history); Courtauld Institute, University of London (PhD, Art History)
- Known for: Printmaking; writing; teaching; Founder of Black Star Press (Teddington,1987)
- Awards: Fenton Arts Trust Award (2010)
- Elected: Royal Society of Painter Printmakers HonRE (1994) ARE (2003) RE (2005) VPRE

Anthony Dyson (1931–2023) was an English artist, master printmaker, art historian, teacher and writer.

He was a Senior lecturer in the University of London Institute of Education, until 1987.

He founded Black Star Press in Teddington, London in 1987. A master printmaker, Dyson collaborated with artists Robin Tanner and Edgar Holloway, and printed historically engraved plates for the Tate and Harvard University.

Elected an honorary fellow of the Royal Society of Painter-Printmakers in 1994. Unusually, Dyson was then elected as a fellow, enabling him to participate in the society's annual exhibitions and later serve as Vice President.

He received the Fenton Arts Trust Award in 2010.

== Bibliography ==
- (1983) Thomas Ross & Son, Fine Art Printers: The Nineteenth Century Heritage
- (1984) Pictures to Print: The Nineteenth-Century Engraving Trade
- (1986) Etching and Engraving: Techniques and Tradition
- (2001) Passion and Paradox: The Art of Stanisław Frenkiel, Black Star Press, London. Monograph of Stanisław Frenkiel
- (2009) Printmaker's Secrets

== Selected exhibitions ==
- Le Lion d'Angers, France (2006, 2007)

== Selected collections ==
- British Museum
- Victoria and Albert Museum
- Science Museum, London
- Guildhall Library
- Institute of Education
- Birkbeck College
- Ashmolean Museum
- CSM Museum & Study Collection, Central Saint Martins, University of the Arts London
- School of Art Collections, Aberystwyth University
- Sagene Laererskole, Oslo
- Leonardo Sciascia Print Foundation, Italy
- Harvard Theatre Collection, Houghton Library
