= Thomas Ross & Son =

English fine art printers (founded in 1833)

- Founded: June 21, 1833; 193 years ago (as Dixon & Ross)
- Founder: William Ross; John Dixon & Henry Dixon
- Headquarters: 4 St James's Place, Hampstead Road (1833–64) [street renamed in 1864] 70 Hampstead Road (1864–1966); Hounslow West (temporarily during WW2); Manfred Road, Putney (from 1966)
- Products: Fine Art Prints
- Website: thomasross.co.uk

Thomas Ross & Son, also known as Ross's, is an English fine art printers, founded in 1833 in London.

The privately held company is a publisher of fine art prints and a specialist in intaglio printmaking, with a significant archive collection dating back to 1700, including old master prints, totalling circa 10,000 images. The company is particularly known for traditional printmaking by hand, and watercolour by hand. They publish editions of historical engravings, etchings (including aquatints) and mezzotints from copper plates.

The company was founded as Dixon & Ross in 1833 by father John Dixon, and son Henry Dixon, formerly of Dixon & Son (1805–1833), along with William Ross. The Dixons eventually left the company, which passed to William Ross's relative Thomas Ross (16 August 1808 – 15 December 1886). By 1876 the company was renamed after Thomas Ross. Thomas Ross' son (Thomas Ross Junior (1833 – 13 December 1907)) joined the company, leading it to be renamed in 1886 as Thomas Ross & Son.

″What you really ought to do is to pay a visit to a proper engraver's printer, such as Messrs Ross and Son, of 70, Hampstead Road.″ – Percy H. Martindale (1869–1943), Engraving Old and Modern (1928)

Praised by the jury of the Exposition Universelle (1855) in Paris, alongside only two other British printing companies, both would later be acquired by Thomas Ross & Son.

== History ==
- June 21, 1833 – The earliest recorded date in the company's archives: an expense for shop signage displaying Dixon & Ross at 4 St James's Place, London. A former stable.
- 1837 – Records show the account of J. M. W. Turner, charged for proofing his plates worked by the engraver John Goodall.
- 1864 – St James's Place, Hampstead Road, London is combined with, and renamed to Hampstead Road, London.
- 1876 – Renamed as Thomas Ross.
- 1886 – Renamed as Thomas Ross & Son.
- 1905 – Ownership transferred to Alfred Edwin Pomeroy (October 1862 – 13 August 1934) (a former apprentice at the company), and remained in the Pomeroy family.
- 19xx – Alfred Henry Seex Pomeroy (17 March 1890 – 6 May 1962) son of Alfred Edwin Pomeroy, became managing director.
- 1956 – Acquisition of the older firm of plate printers, McQueen & Co. (c. 1790–1956) by merger. Master printmaker Philip McQueen joined, bringing the stock of his family firm.
- 1963 – Frances Beryl S Pomeroy, known as Beryl Pomeroy (Cranfield, Middlesex 13 September 1922 – London 31 January 2005), great-granddaughter of Alfred Edwin Pomeroy, became managing director, publishing new mezzotints by Lawrence Josset and Arthur Hogg, printed in colour by George Hardcastle.
- 1985 – Ownership transferred to the Nutburn family of Reading, Berkshire and incorporated as Thomas Ross Ltd, registered in Southampton.

Managing Directors of Thomas Ross & Son
Years	Managing Director	Notes	Ref.
1833–	William Ross (–) John Dixon (–) & Henry Dixon (–)	Possibly William Burdett Ross (1810 – 25 September 1881) brother of Thomas Ross (16 August 1808 – 15 December 1886). Sons of Thomas Ross (20 December 1785 – 1870). All three were 'steel and copper plate printers'.	
1876–1886	Thomas Ross (16 August 1808 – 15 December 1886)	Brother of William Burdett Ross (1810 – 25 September 1881). Born: 16 August 1808 • St Marys Newington, Surrey (now London) Died: 15 December 1886 • 70 Hempstead Rd, Middlesex (now London)	
1886–1905	Thomas Ross Jnr (1833 – 13 December 1907)	Son of Thomas Ross (16 August 1808 – 15 December 1886). Born: 21 June 1833 • St Pancras, London Died: 13 December 1907 • St Pancras, London	
1905–	Alfred Edwin Pomeroy (October 1862 – 13 August 1934)	Who joined as an apprentice thirty years earlier.	
19xx–63	Alfred Henry Seex Pomeroy (17 March 1890 – 6 May 1962)	Son of Alfred Edwin Pomeroy.	
1963–89	Frances Beryl S Pomeroy known as Beryl Pomeroy (Cranfield, Middlesex 13 September 1922 – London 31 January 2005)	Granddaughter of Alfred Edwin Pomeroy (October 1862 – 13 August 1934). The business was sold to the Nutburn family in Reading.	
1989–current	Nutburn family	Restructured as Thomas Ross Ltd, part of The Nutbrown Group.	

== Other companies ==
- Dixon & Son (1805–33), 29 Tottenham Street, Fitzroy Square (John, from 1805) (also 5 Tottenham Mews, which seems to have been part of the same premises). Founded by John Dixon and later with son Henry Dixon.
- Henry Dixon (1820–1893) would found Henry Dixon & Son (1887 – c.1940), 112 Albany Street, London. A successful fine art photographers, with his son Thomas James Dixon (1857–1943). Henry Dixon had apprenticed to his elder brother, Thomas Dixon (d.1875) as copperplate printer; also apprenticed to Thomas Ross 1836 – 1843.

== Bibliography ==
- (1928) Percy H. Martindale, Engraving Old and Modern
- (1966) Iain Bain, Thomas Ross & Son, Copper-and Steel-Plate Printers Since 1833
- (1983) Anthony Dyson, Thomas Ross & Son, Fine Art Printers: The Nineteenth Century Heritage
- (1984) Anthony Dyson, Pictures to Print: Nineteenth-century Engraving Trade
- (1984) Anthony Dyson, Images Interpreted: Landseer and the Engraving Trade. Print Quarterly, 1(1), 29–43.
- (2005) Anthony Dyson, Obituary of Beryl Pomeroy, The Independent, 29 March 2005

== See also ==
- Printing Historical Society, London
- American Printing History Association, New York City
