= Fernando Sánchez (designer) =

Belgian fashion designer (1935–2006)

Fernando Sánchez (9 August 1935 – 28 June 2006) was a Belgian fashion designer. He was known for his provocative lingerie collections, which, though designed for elegant boudoirs, were often worn in public. He created the two famous dresses of Madonna's "Like a Virgin" music video. Sanchez was awarded several Coty fashion awards, as well as a Council of Fashion Designers of America Award in 1981.

== Biography ==
Sanchez was born into a wealthy family in Antwerp, Belgium. His father died when he was very young. When Sanchez was in his teens, he would go with his mother to Paris to see Jacques Fath's designs. Later, he sent a portfolio to Fath, who recommended him to the École de la Chambre Syndicale de la Couture, a fashion school in Paris. There, he ended up a classmate of Yves Saint Laurent. While St. Laurent would later revolutionize how women dressed during the day, Sanchez would revolutionize how women dressed at night.

In 1960, inspired by the movie West Side Story, he moved to New York City fifteen days after watching it. Sanchez started his own company in 1974, where he introduced techniques normally used in dress construction to slips and caftans, making underwear resemble outerwear. He did not deem his work to be merely lingerie, and it was not treated as such by the fashion world. His fashion shows were as highly attended as those of more conventional designers. His work foreshadowed the mainstream acceptance of lingerie-like clothing in the 1990s.

He designed the lingerie used by Cher in the comedy horror The Witches of Eastwick and some dresses for Tina Turner shows. Elizabeth Taylor wore one Sanchez dress for one Vanity Fair cover in 1992. Very known in New York, he was a regular at Studio 54 nightclub and his agenda of friends and contacts included Yves Saint Laurent, Liza Minnelli, Andy Warhol, and Jerry Hall.

Sanchez later worked for Nina Ricci, Christian Dior (where St. Laurent hired him to design lingerie), the New York lingerie company Warner's, and Yalla Inc.

He died on 28 June 2006 in Manhattan, New York, from cardiac arrest arising from complications of leishmaniasis, a disease transmitted by sand fly bites.
