= Pop Shop =

Store selling memorabilia of artist Keith Haring's designs

- Industry: Retail
- Founded: 1986
- Founder: Keith Haring
- Defunct: 2005

The Pop Shop was a store owned by pop artist Keith Haring. Haring opened the first Pop Shop in New York City in 1986 and one in Tokyo in 1988. Haring viewed the Pop Shop as an extension of his work. Every area of the store was devoted to Haring's work, including floor-to-ceiling murals. It served to fulfill the artist's desire to make his iconic and beloved imagery accessible to the widest possible range of people both during his lifetime and posthumously through the Keith Haring Foundation.

== Background ==
"Here’s the philosophy behind the Pop Shop: I wanted to continue this same sort of communication as with the subway drawings. I wanted to attract the same wide range of people, and I wanted it to be a place where, yes, not only collectors could come, but also kids from the Bronx. The main point was that we didn’t want to produce things that would cheapen the art. In other words, this was still an art statement."

— Keith Haring

First known for his chalk drawings in the New York City subway, Keith Haring gained international recognition after a solo exhibition at Tony Shafrazi Gallery in 1982. He continued to draw in the subways, but by 1984, people were stealing the pieces he made from the subways as his artwork became more expensive and more popular within the art market. The increase in value of his art meant only a select few could afford to buy it, and soon people were selling imitations of his drawings.

Haring stated that he opened a shop for two reasons. It was something he had wanted to do since he was 10 years old, and ''there were so many copies of my stuff around that I felt I had to do something myself so people would at least know what the real ones look like.''

Haring's friend and mentor Andy Warhol was "a big supporter" of the Pop Shop. Haring felt the Pop Shop was "keeping ideologically with what Andy was doing and what conceptual artists and earth artists were doing: It was all about participation on a big level."

== New York Pop Shop ==
On April 19, 1986, Haring opened the Pop Shop at 292 Lafayette Street in Manhattan's SoHo neighborhood. The store was designed by the architectural firm of Moore & Pennoyer, but Haring painted the wall, floor and ceiling. The retail space was small, so the store was designed to use the space effectively. There was only one of each item on display, and a salesclerk checked off the things customers wanted to buy, then the merchandise was picked up at a counter. Haring compared the Pop Shop to a Brookstone shop, he added it was his "version of fast food or fast art.'' The shop was managed by Haring's friend Bobby Breslau until he died in 1987.

The Pop Shop sold an inflatable baby-shaped pillow, AM-FM radios, refrigerator magnets, enamel pins and charms, buttons, Swatch watches, sweatshirts, and embroidered satin jackets covered in Haring's "playful, energetic characters." In addition, the Pop Shop sold T-shirts with designs by Haring and his friends, including Andy Warhol, Kenny Scharf, Futura 2000, and Stephen Sprouse.

The Pop Shop closed on August 28, 2005, because the rent was increasing and the shop wasn't earning enough to cover expenses. Matthew Barolo, operations manager at the Keith Haring Foundation, felt the resources would be better spent for other projects. Pop Shop merchandise is occasionally available through international licensing and exhibition-related projects.

The original Pop Shop ceiling was donated to the New York Historical Society and is installed in its entry.

In 2006, the exhibition Keith Haring: Art and Commerce at the Tampa Museum of Art studied the history of the Pop Shop.

In 2009, the shop was reconstructed as part of London's Tate Modern's exhibition Pop Life: Art in a Material World.

== Pop Shop Tokyo ==
Haring collaborated with Japanese film producer Kaz Kuzui, and his American wife, film director Fran Rubel Kuzui to open a Pop Shop in Tokyo, in the Aoyama neighborhood. Like the New York Pop Shop, Haring painted the interior of the store from the floor to the ceiling. Haring's friend, photographer Tseng Kwong Chi captured Haring painting the shop.

The Tokyo Pop Shop opened on January 30, 1988. It was short-lived and closed in the summer of 1988 due to disappointing sales. Haring noted that there were "too many Haring fakes available all over Tokyo and, this time, they're really well done." When the shop closed, the painted containers that shaped the store were given to art publisher George Mulder of Berlin as a gift from Haring. The containers were restored and exhibited in Saint Tropez, France in 2005.
