= LA II =

American graffiti artist (born 1967)

Angel Oritz
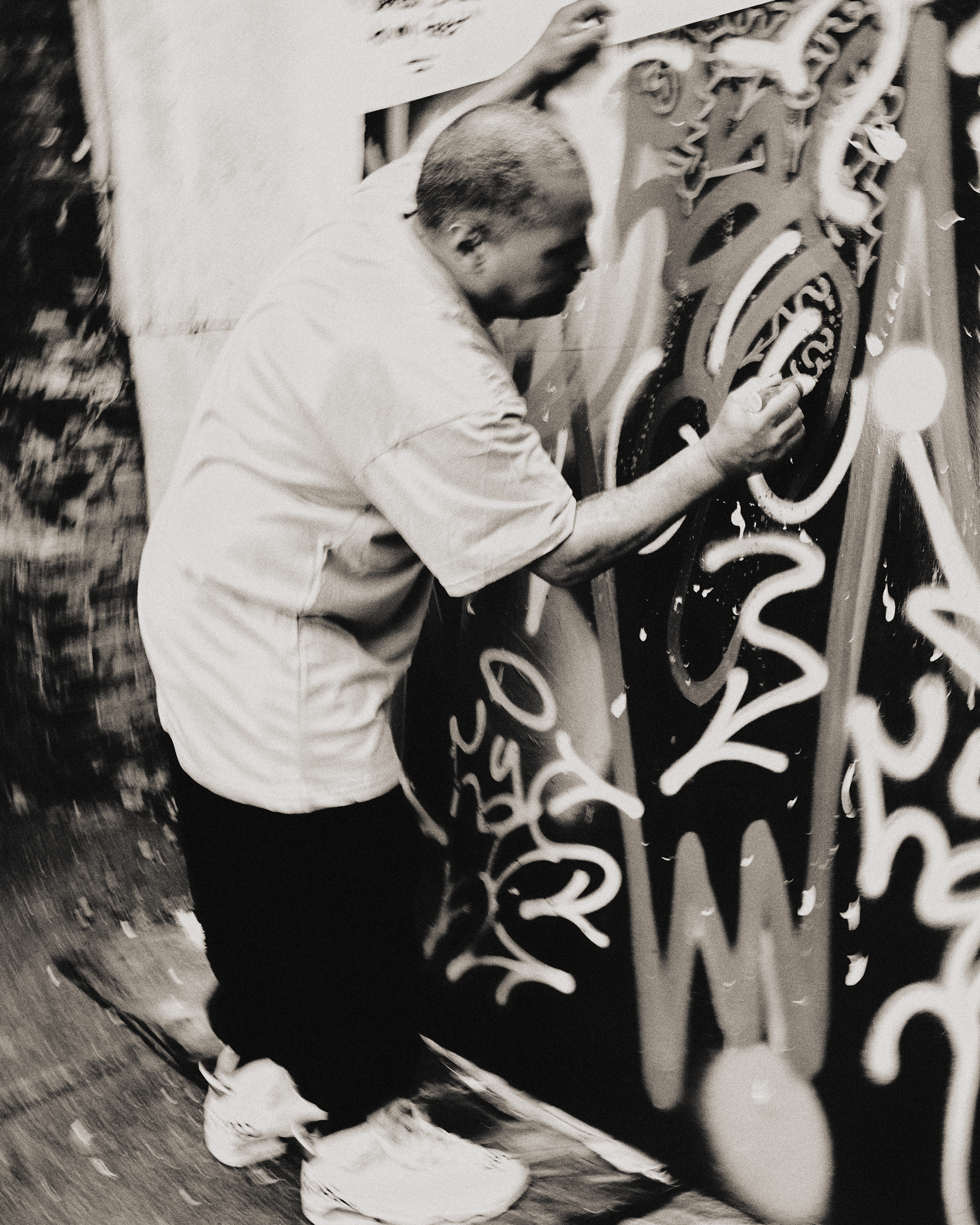
- Born: Angel Ortiz; 1967 (age 58–59); New York City, U.S.
- Education: Self-taught
- Known for: graffiti art; street art; painting
- Website: la2studio.com

Angel Ortiz (born 1967), known as Little Angel, and professionally as LA II or LA2 is a Puerto Rican, American graffiti artist and painter. He is best known for his collaborations with Pop artist Keith Haring in the 1980s, contributing his signature tags and distinctive interlocking graffiti motifs to Haring's work.

Born and raised in New York City, Ortiz began tagging across the Lower East Side in the late 1970s. His work caught the attention of Haring, whom he befriended in 1981, leading to a prolific creative partnership. Ortiz traveled internationally with Haring and collaborated on numerous works. After Haring's death in 1990, Ortiz's role in their partnership was often minimized or overlooked by the art establishment. Ortiz also struggled with drug addiction and was incarcerated multiple times for drug possession, car theft, and vandalism. Despite these setbacks, he continued to create art and mounted several solo exhibitions. In later years, his contributions to the Haring collaborations received renewed recognition from critics, institutions, and the broader art world.

== Biography ==
=== Early life and exposure to graffiti ===
Ortiz was born at Bellevue Hospital in New York City to a Puerto Rican mother. He grew up with two brothers and one sister. At age five, he lived in the East New York section of Brooklyn before his family relocated to the Lower East Side of Manhattan. He attended P.S. 15 on 4th Street and Avenue D.

Ortiz was introduced to graffiti at the Boys Club when he was 10 years old. He recalled watching a group of older kids return from painting subway cars with ink-stained hands and spray cans, then quietly cleaning up before their parents noticed. Though initially frightened to join them, he soon began accompanying the group to write on walls, later saying, "I've been addicted ever since then."

He began tagging across the Lower East Side under the name LA II (also written as LA2). Explaining the moniker, Ortiz said: "People want to know what LA II stands for. I tell them my real name is Angel Ortiz, but that LA stands for Little Angel, because my name is Angel and I'm only five foot four inches. So I'm little—I'm a little guy and I'm not gonna grow no more than this. I put the II, because the real LA is Los Angeles, California—and that's LA I. So LA II—it's me."

=== Collaborations with Keith Haring ===
In 1981, Ortiz's subway tags caught Keith Haring's attention, sparking a friendship and creative partnership. "LA was the veritable graffiti king of the Lower East Side. He was king by virtue of the amounts of tags he had drawn. The sheer numbers alone were staggering, and they assured him a permanent place in the graffiti universe," Haring recalled. Haring was "so crazy about LA II's tag" that he invited Ortiz to his Broome Street studio, where the two drew together on wood and metal surfaces, layering Ortiz's signature tags with Haring's "non-specific little marks embellishing and covering the surface." We just immediately hit it off. It's as if we'd known each other all our lives. He's like my little brother. From the beginning, it's a paternal or fraternal sort of relationship—that's all it is," said Haring.

Ortiz remembered their first collaboration in similarly striking terms: "he blended my stuff with his stuff, and it looked real nice." One of the works sold for $1,400, and Haring gave him $700. For Ortiz, it was transformative: "I couldn't believe it. It was big money for me at this very early age of fourteen." When Ortiz told his mother, she was skeptical, suspecting the money came from illegal activity because "a lot of things were happening, like a lot of junk kids they were snatching pocketbooks and stealing chains." To reassure her, Ortiz called Haring, who came to their home to explain, and over dinner he won her trust, securing her permission to work and travel with her son. Ortiz subsequently dropped out of school.

Between 1982 and 1984, Haring and Ortiz collaborated on several exhibitions, including at the Tony Shafrazi Gallery and the Fun Gallery in New York City. They created murals at the Watari Gallery in Tokyo, the Fiorucci store in Milan, and a construction site near PPG Place in Philadelphia. Through Haring, Ortiz also met other prominent artists such as Andy Warhol, Jean-Michel Basquiat, and Kenny Scharf. Scharf recalled that "Keith treated him as a true collaborator; he didn't treat him like some little kid, which he actually was, really. He respected him and gave him half of whatever they collaborated on." Their collaboration became less frequent by 1985, as Haring's global recognition expanded and Ortiz stayed based in the Lower East Side. However, the two maintained a close friendship until Haring died from AIDS in 1990.

=== Personal struggles and reclaiming authorship ===
Ortiz later confirmed that he was paid for his work during Haring's lifetime, but after Haring's death, he stopped receiving payments from the estate, and his role in the collaborations had largely been overlooked. While Haring rose rapidly within the gallery system, Ortiz did not share in that trajectory. In the 1990s, he struggled with heroin addiction and served eight months in prison for possession. Between 1987 and 2002, Ortiz was arrested at least nine times, and again in 2003 for marijuana possession.

In 1997, the Whitney Museum of American Art mounted a Haring retrospective that included Haring/LA II collaborations attributed solely to Haring. Ortiz attended a public tour and, upon viewing one of the works, asked what had happened to LA II. A museum coordinator reportedly replied that LA II was "a black artist who is dead." Ortiz responded, "No, I'm LA II," drawing attention from the crowd. He recalled being told, "this is a business, this is not your show," before being escorted out of the museum.

In 2008, Ortiz intervened in a re-created Haring mural at the Houston Bowery Wall in New York City, filling the negative space with an intricate black interlocking pattern and repeatedly tagging "LA II" in spray paint. The act was intended to draw attention to Ortiz's exclusion from accounts of Haring's success. Ortiz said, "when I was painting that mural, I didn't feel like it was me, I felt like it was Keith's spirit in me… I don't want to be rich and famous. What keeps me going is my art. I wanted to show the foundation: This is LA II, this is how it all started." That same year, Ortiz told The New York Sun that the executive director of the Keith Haring Foundation, Julia Gruen, had "repeatedly asked him to help authenticate Haring works in preparation for sale at auction houses such as Sotheby's while refusing his request for recognition by the foundation." Scholar Ricardo Montez noted that the Keith Haring Foundation has "since made strides to rectify LA2's erasure."

In 2011, Ortiz was arrested three times in quick succession for tagging his LA II and LA ROC signatures over a Kenny Scharf mural at Houston and Bowery Street, as well as for painting a large graffiti piece on the Urban Outfitters store on Second Avenue in the East Village. Ironically, Ortiz was officially recognized as an Urban Outfitters artist at the time. The third arrest occurred the night before his exhibition at Dorian Grey Gallery in March 2011, disrupting the opening. He linked the outburst to personal grief after the death of his wife in January 2011, saying, "I used the street as a canvas to express myself. It's an emotional thing that I'm still going through."

His show at the Dorian Grey Gallery ultimately floundered and did not generate enough income for him to post bail. Reflecting on it, Ortiz admitted, "I shouldn't have done it. I knew sooner or later I was going to get arrested." His friend Ramona Lugo described his persistence as part of his identity: "That is the mentality of the graffiti artist." Ortiz was sentenced to 45 days at Rikers Island. He had previously been in prison on car theft and drug charges.After his release, Ortiz reflected, "I went there for graffiti and got transformed into a gladiator. They got all the gangs in there: the Bloods, the Latin Kings." He also said the experience ultimately gave him time to reflect and renewed his artistic focus.

In 2016, Ortiz was arrested in New York City following an incident on June 28 in the East Village, where he was charged with robbery, criminal possession of a weapon, menacing, and petit larceny. According to police, he allegedly took a man’s cell phone outside a restaurant on Third Avenue, smashed it after a brief struggle, then entered a nearby restaurant, obtained a steak knife, and threatened several people on East 14th Street. Police later found Ortiz nearby holding the knife before taking him into custody. He was subsequently indicted on multiple charges and released on bail after approximately three weeks in jail.

=== Later exhibitions ===
In 2022, Ortiz had his solo first solo exhibition outside of the U.S., King of Hearts, at the D'Stassi Art Gallery in Shoreditch, London. He created over 30 new large-scale paintings for the show.

In 2023, his exhibition ODE 2 NYC was displayed at Chase Contemporary in New York City.

== Legacy ==
Ortiz's collaborations with Keith Haring helped bring graffiti aesthetics into the fine art world, with joint works entering major museum collections, including the Whitney Museum of American Art in New York and the Museum of Contemporary Art in Los Angeles. The market has also reflected this legacy: a 1982 Haring and Ortiz's collaborative painting sold for $1.4 million at auction in 2018.

Despite these achievements, artist Clayton Patterson, an advocate for Ortiz, argued that Ortiz’s contributions had long been underrecognized. In 2020, Patterson wrote, "LA2's struggle and history make him important to me… Keith had the barking dog and the radiant baby. But it's graphics, not fine art. LA2 created the fill-ins. Those little symbols in Keith’s work are LA2's signatures." He added, "LA2 was not just the help. The art establishment has shafted him." Patterson has attributed Ortiz's long marginalization in part to racism within the art world.
