= Viral meningitis =

- Other names: Aseptic meningitis
- Viral meningitis causes inflammation of the meninges.
- Specialty: Neurology

Viral meningitis, also known as aseptic meningitis, is a type of meningitis due to a viral infection. It results in inflammation of the meninges (the membranes covering the brain and spinal cord). Symptoms commonly include headache, fever, sensitivity to light and neck stiffness.

Viruses are the most common cause of aseptic meningitis. Most cases of viral meningitis are caused by enteroviruses (common stomach viruses). However, other viruses can also cause viral meningitis, such as West Nile virus, mumps, measles, herpes simplex types I and II, varicella and lymphocytic choriomeningitis (LCM) virus. Based on clinical symptoms, viral meningitis cannot be reliably differentiated from bacterial meningitis, although viral meningitis typically follows a more benign clinical course. Viral meningitis has no evidence of bacteria present in cerebral spinal fluid (CSF). Therefore, lumbar puncture with CSF analysis is often needed to identify the disease.

In most cases, there is no specific treatment, with efforts generally aimed at relieving symptoms (headache, fever or nausea). A few viral causes, such as HSV, have specific treatments.

In the United States, viral meningitis is the cause of more than half of all cases of meningitis. With the prevalence of bacterial meningitis in decline, the viral disease is garnering more and more attention. The estimated incidence has a considerable range, from 0.26 to 17 cases per 100,000 people. For enteroviral meningitis, the most common cause of viral meningitis, there are up to 75,000 cases annually in the United States alone. While the disease can occur in both children and adults, it is more common in children.

== Signs and symptoms ==
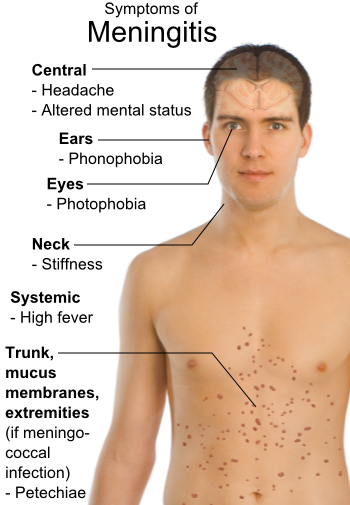
Symptoms of Meningitis

Viral meningitis characteristically presents with fever, headache and neck stiffness. Fever is the result of cytokines released that affect the thermoregulatory (temperature control) neurons of the hypothalamus. Cytokines and increased intracranial pressure stimulate nociceptors in the brain that lead to headaches. Neck stiffness is the result of inflamed meninges stretching due to flexion of the spine. The various layers of meninges act to form a separation between the brain and the skull. In contrast to bacterial meningitis, symptoms associated with viral meningitis are often less severe and do not progress as quickly. Nausea, vomiting and photophobia (light sensitivity) also commonly occur, as do general signs of a viral infection, such as muscle aches and malaise. Increased cranial pressure from viral meningitis stimulates the area postrema, which causes nausea and vomiting. Widened pulse pressure (systolic - diastolic blood pressure), bradycardia, and irregular respiration would be alarming for Cushing's reflex, a sign of acutely elevated intracranial pressure. Photophobia is due to meningeal irritation. In severe cases, people may experience concomitant encephalitis (meningoencephalitis), which is suggested by symptoms such as altered mental status, seizures or focal neurologic deficits.

Babies with viral meningitis may only appear irritable, sleepy or have trouble eating. Infection in the neonatal period may be the result of infection during pregnancy. The pediatric population may show some additional signs and symptoms that include jaundice and bulging fontanelles. A biphasic fever is more often seen in children compared to adults. The first fever arrives with the onset of general constitutional symptoms, and the second accompanying the onset of the neurological symptoms.

Symptoms can vary depending on the virus responsible for infection. Enteroviral meningitis (the most common cause) typically presents with the classic headache, photophobia, fever, nausea, vomiting, and nuchal rigidity. With coxsackie and echo virus' specifically, a maculopapular rash may be present, or even the typical vesicles seen with Herpangina. Lymphocytic choriomeningitis virus (LCMV) can be differentiated from the common presenting meningeal symptoms by the appearance of a prodromal influenza-like sickness about 10 days before other symptoms begin. Mumps meningitis can present similarly to isolated mumps, with possible parotid and testicular swelling. Interestingly, research has shown that HSV-2 meningitis most often occurs in people with no history of genital herpes, and that a severe frontal headache is among the most common presenting symptoms. Patients with varicella zoster meningitis may present with herpes zoster (Shingles) in conjunction with classic meningeal signs. Meningitis can be an indication that an individual with HIV is undergoing seroconversion, the time when the human body is forming antibodies in response to the virus.

== Causes ==
The most common causes of viral meningitis in the United States are non-polio enteroviruses. The viruses that cause meningitis are typically acquired from sick contacts. However, in most cases, people infected with viruses that may cause meningitis do not actually develop meningitis.

Viruses that can cause meningitis include:

- Enteroviruses
  - Enterovirus 71
  - Echovirus
  - Poliovirus (PV1, PV2, PV3)
  - Coxsackie A virus (CAV); also causes Hand foot and mouth disease
- Herpesviridae (HHV)
  - Herpes simplex virus type 1 (HSV-1 / HHV-1) or type 2 (HSV-2 / HHV-2); also cause cold sores or genital herpes
  - Varicella zoster (VZV / HHV-3); also causes chickenpox and shingles (herpes zoster)
  - Epstein–Barr virus (EBV / HHV-4); also causes infectious mononucleosis/"mono"
  - Cytomegalovirus (CMV / HHV-5)
- Human immunodeficiency virus (HIV); causes AIDS
- La Crosse virus
- Lymphocytic choriomeningitis virus (LCMV)
- Measles
- Mumps
- St. Louis encephalitis virus
- West Nile virus

== Mechanism ==
Meningitis

Viral Meningitis is mostly caused by an infectious agent that has colonized somewhere in its host. People who are already in an immunocompromised state are at the highest risk of pathogen entry. Some of the most common examples of immunocompromised individuals include those with HIV, cancer, diabetes, malnutrition, certain genetic disorders, and patients on chemotherapy. Potential sites for this include the skin, respiratory tract, gastrointestinal tract, nasopharynx, and genitourinary tract. The organism invades the submucosa at these sites by invading host defenses, such as local immunity, physical barriers, and phagocytes or macrophages. After pathogen invasion, the immune system is activated. An infectious agent can enter the central nervous system and cause meningeal disease via invading the bloodstream, a retrograde neuronal pathway, or by direct contiguous spread. Immune cells and damaged endothelial cells release matrix metalloproteinases (MMPs), cytokines, and nitric oxide. MMPs and NO induce vasodilation in the cerebral vasculature. Cytokines induce capillary wall changes in the blood brain barrier, which leads to expression of more leukocyte receptors, thus increasing white blood cell binding and extravasation.

The barrier that the meninges create between the brain and the bloodstream are what normally protect the brain from the body's immune system. Damage to the meninges and endothelial cells increases cytotoxic reactive oxygen species production, which damages pathogens as well as nearby cells. In meningitis, the barrier is disrupted, so once viruses have entered the brain, they are isolated from the immune system and can spread. This leads to elevated intracranial pressure, cerebral edema, meningeal irritation, and neuronal death.

== Diagnosis ==
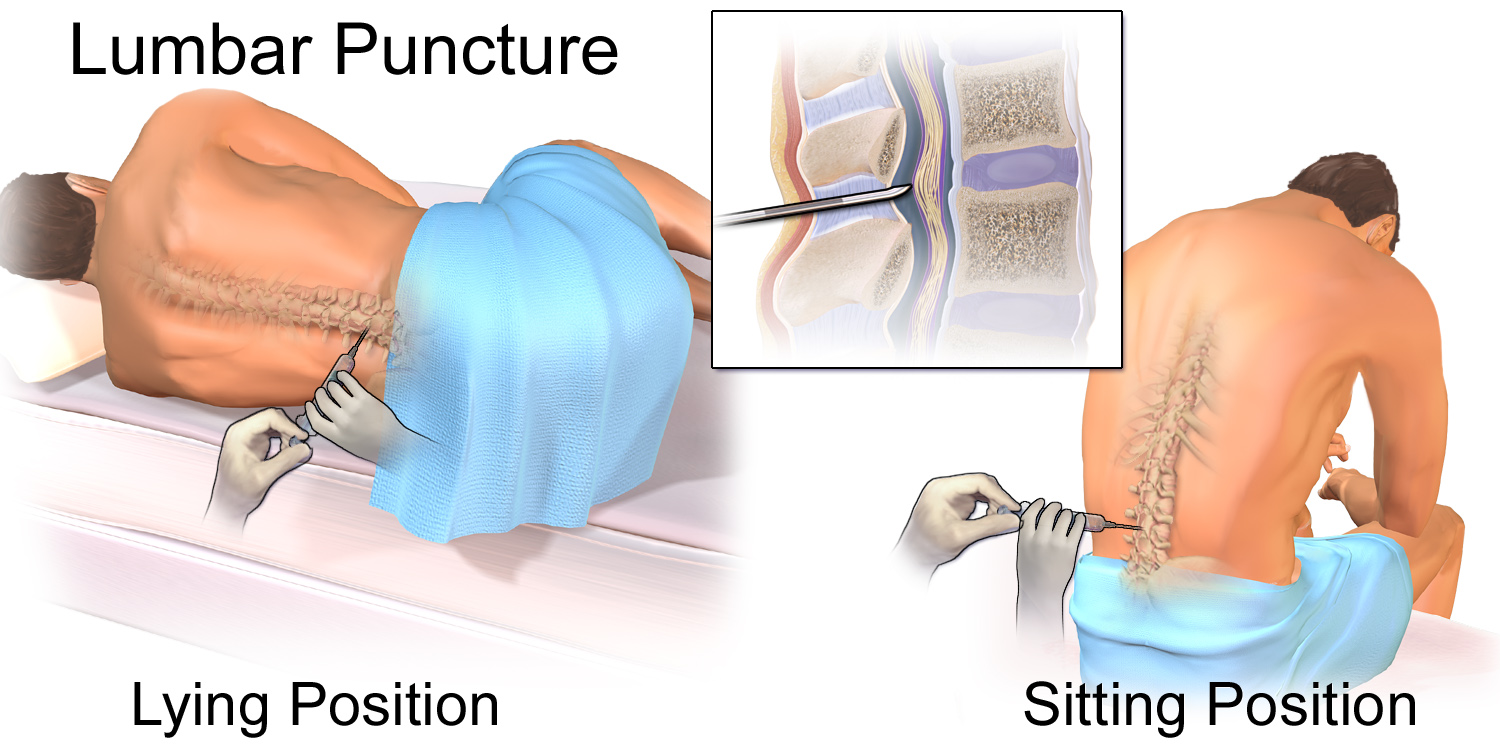
Lumbar Puncture

The diagnosis of viral meningitis is made by clinical history, physical exam, and several diagnostic tests. Kernig and Brudzinski signs may be elucidated with specific physical exam maneuvers, and can help diagnose meningitis at the bedside. Most importantly however, cerebrospinal fluid (CSF) is collected via lumbar puncture (also known as spinal tap). This fluid, which normally surrounds the brain and spinal cord, is then analyzed for signs of infection. CSF findings that suggest a viral cause of meningitis include an elevated white blood cell count (usually 10-100 cells/μL) with a lymphocytic predominance in combination with a normal glucose level. Increasingly, cerebrospinal fluid PCR tests have become especially useful for diagnosing viral meningitis, with an estimated sensitivity of 95-100%. Additionally, samples from the stool, urine, blood and throat can also help to identify viral meningitis. CSF vs serum c-reactive protein and procalcitonin have not been shown to elucidate whether meningitis is bacterial or viral.

In certain cases, a CT scan of the head should be done before a lumbar puncture such as in those with poor immune function or those with increased intracranial pressure. If the patient has focal neurological deficits, papilledema, a Glasgow Coma Score less than 12, or a recent history of seizures, lumbar puncture should be reconsidered.

Differential diagnosis for viral meningitis includes meningitis caused by bacteria, mycoplasma, fungus, and drugs such as NSAIDS, TMP-SMX, IVIG. Further considerations include brain tumors, lupus, vasculitis, and Kawasaki disease in the pediatric population.

== Treatment ==
Aciclovir

Because there is no clinical differentiation between bacterial and viral meningitis, people with suspected disease should be sent to the hospital for further evaluation. Treatment for viral meningitis is generally supportive. Rest, hydration, antipyretics, and pain or anti-inflammatory medications may be given as needed. However, if there is initial uncertainty as to whether the meningitis is bacterial or viral in origin, empiric antibiotics are often given until bacterial infection is ruled out.

Herpes simplex virus, varicella zoster virus and cytomegalovirus have a specific antiviral therapy. For herpes the treatment of choice is aciclovir. If encephalitis is suspected, empiric treatment with IV aciclovir is often warranted.

Surgical management is indicated where there is extremely increased intracranial pressure, infection of an adjacent bony structure (e.g. mastoiditis), skull fracture, or abscess formation.

The majority of people that have viral meningitis get better within 7–10 days.

== Epidemiology ==
From 1988 to 1999, about 36,000 cases occurred each year in the United States. As recently as 2017, the incidence in the U.S. alone increased to 75,000 cases per year for enteroviral meningitis. With the advent and implementation of vaccinations for organisms such as Streptococcus pneumoniae, Haemophilus influenza type B, and Neisseria meningitis, rates of bacterial meningitis have been in decline, making viral meningitis more common. Countries without high rates of immunization still carry higher rates of bacterial disease. While the disease can occur in both children and adults, it is more common in children. Rates of infection tend to reach a peak in the summer and fall. During an outbreak in Romania and in Spain viral meningitis was more common among adults. While, people aged younger than 15 made up 33.8% of cases. In contrast in Finland in 1966 and in Cyprus in 1996, Gaza 1997, China 1998 and Taiwan 1998, the incidence of viral meningitis was higher among children.

== Recent research ==
It has been proposed that viral meningitis might lead to inflammatory injury of the vertebral artery wall.

The Meningitis Research Foundation is conducting a study to see if new genomic techniques can improve the speed, accuracy and cost of diagnosing meningitis in children in the UK. The research team will develop a new method to be used for the diagnosis of meningitis, analysing the genetic material of microorganisms found in CSF (cerebrospinal fluid). The new method will first be developed using CSF samples where the microorganism is known, but then will be applied to CSF samples where the microorganism is unknown (estimated at around 40%) to try and identify a cause. There is also research investigating whether high-throughput sequencing, wherein the investigator does not need to compare DNA results with known genomic sequences, could be used in specifically diagnosing unknown causes of viral meningitis.

While there is some emerging evidence that bacterial meningitis may have a negative impact on cognitive function, there is no such evidence for viral meningitis.
