= List of works by Keith Haring =

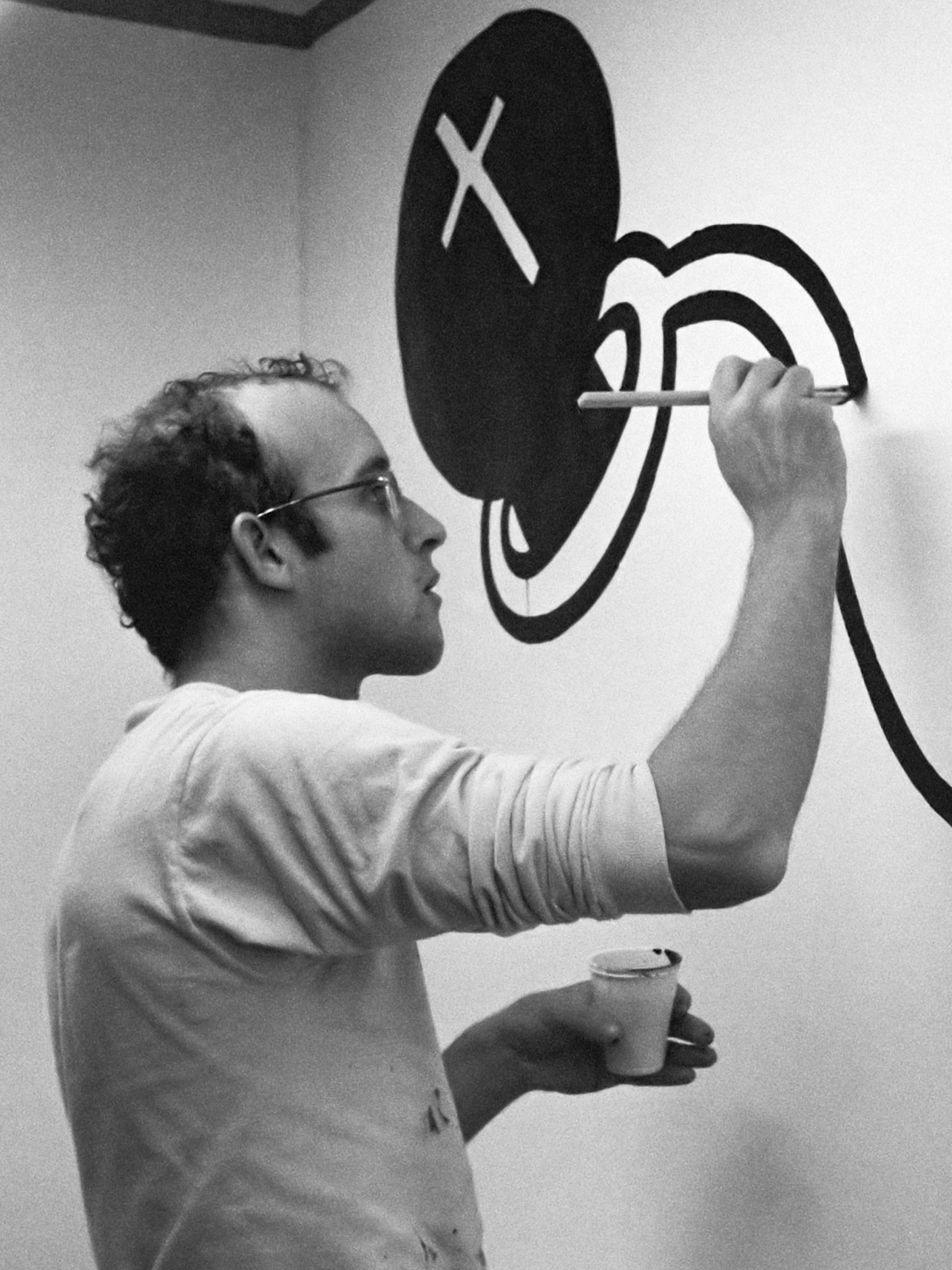
Haring painting a mural at the Stedelijk Museum Amsterdam, 1986

This is an incomplete list of paintings and other works by American artist Keith Haring (1958–1990). Haring's art career gained massive popularity from his chalk drawings at New York City subways. Much of his work was related to social activism, safe sex, AIDS, crack, apartheid, and homosexuality. Haring died on February 16, 1990, from AIDS-related complications.

== Artworks ==
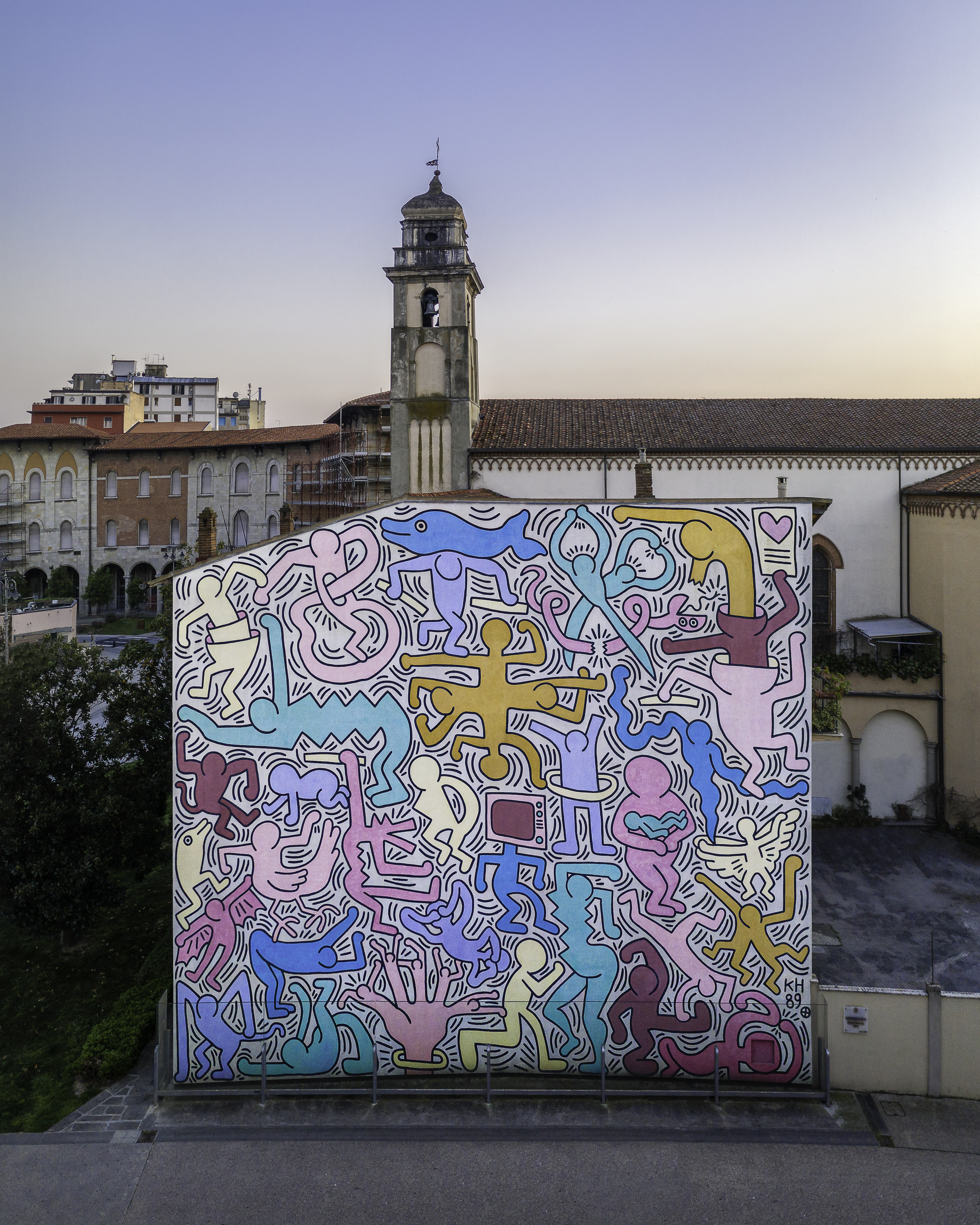
Tuttomondo (1989)

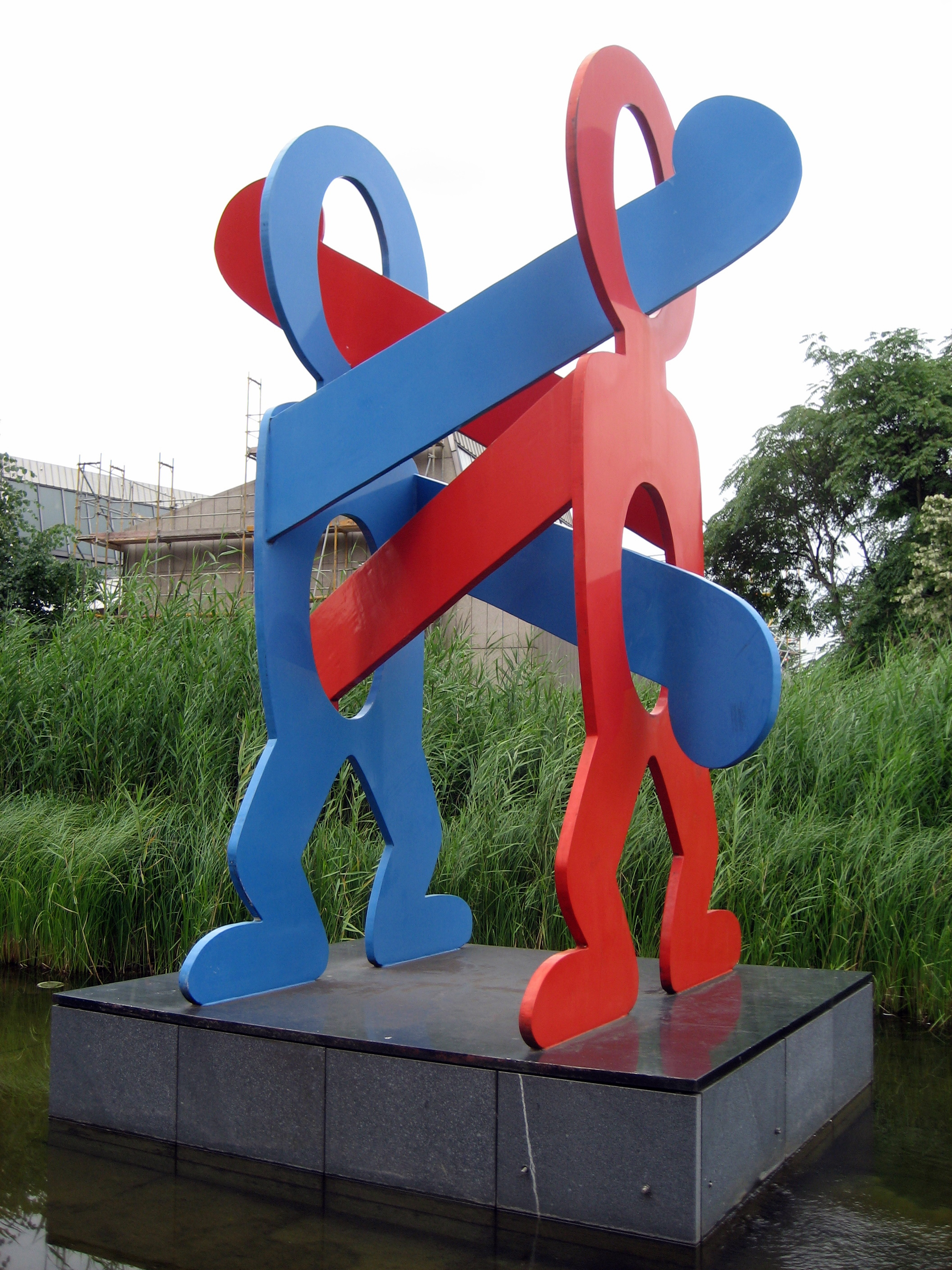
The Boxers (1987)

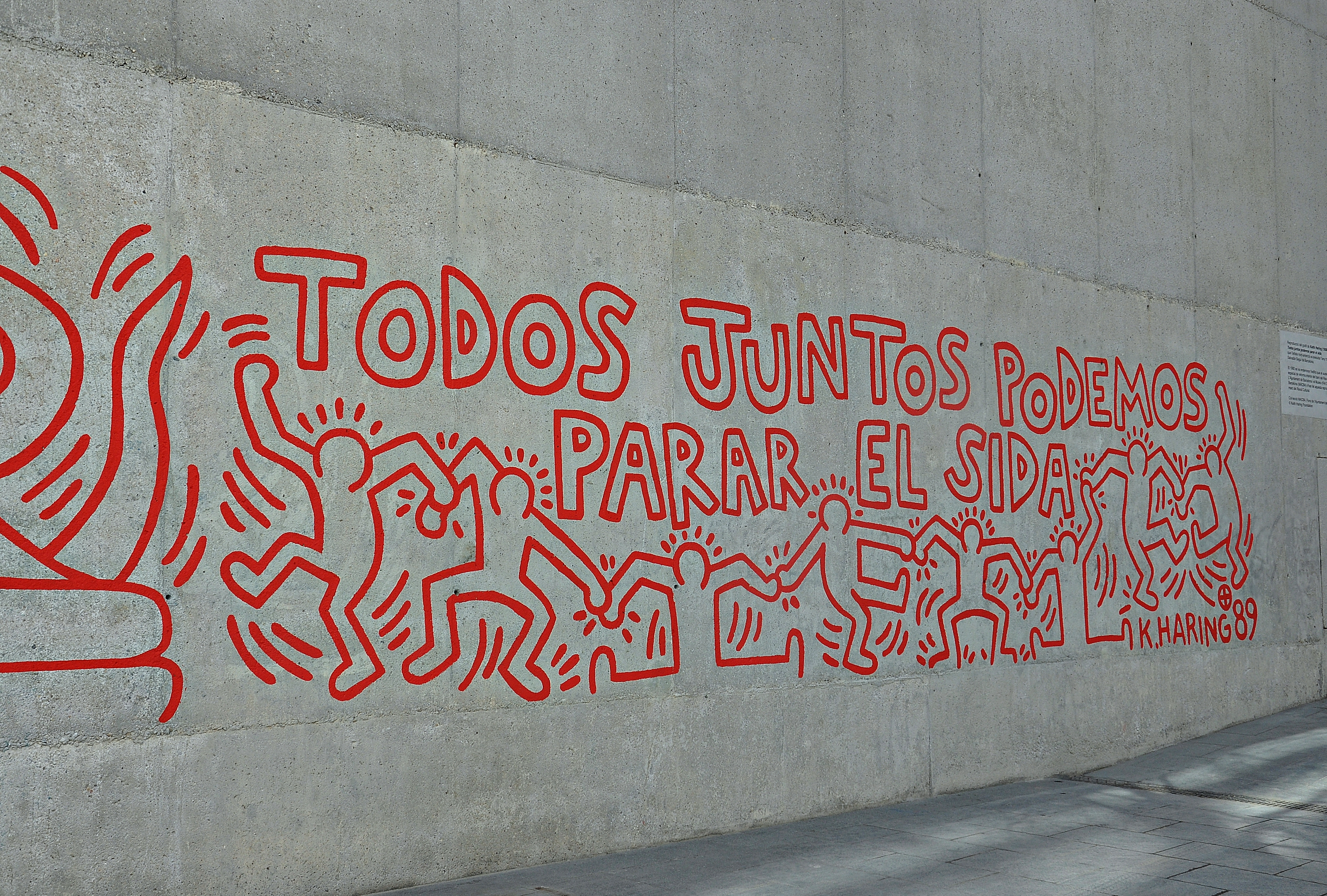
Todos Juntos Podemos Parar el SIDA (1989)

Works are in the order that the Keith Haring Foundation's website has them in. Many of Haring's works are untitled, part of a series, or have similar titles; the number given to artworks on the Keith Haring Foundation's website have been added in order to differentiate between artworks. This list does not include all artworks by Haring.

=== Titled works ===
Artwork number	Title	Year	Medium	Dimensions
5	Apocalypse	1988	Silkscreen	38 × 38 in
6	Apocalypse	1988	Silkscreen	38 × 38 in
7	Apocalypse	1988	Silkscreen	38 × 38 in
16	Moses and the Burning Bush	1985	Acrylic on canvas	120 × 144 in
23	Monkey Puzzle	1988	Acrylic on canvas	120 in diameter^{1}
25	Silence = Death	1989	Acrylic on canvas	40 × 40 in
27	Piglet Goes Shopping	1989	Acrylic on canvas	72 × 96 in
28	Brazil	1989	Acrylic and enamel on canvas	72 × 72 in
29	The Last Rainforest	1989	Acrylic on canvas	72 × 96 in
30	Walking in the Rain	1989	Enamel and acrylic on canvas	72 × 96 in
31	Mom	1989	Acrylic on canvas	60 × 60 in
65	Apocalypse	1988	Silkscreen	38 × 38 in
68	Tree of Life	1985	Acrylic on canvas	120 × 144 in
69-2	AIDS 85	1985	Acrylic and oil on canvas	120 × 120 in
73	The Assassination	1988	Acrylic, enamel on canvas	72 × 96 in
74	The Great White Way	1988	Acrylic on canvas	168 × 45 in
80	The Marriage of Heaven and Hell	1984	Ink on paper	32 × 40 in
84	St. Sebastian	1984	Acrylic on canvas	60 × 60 in
85	Cruella De Vil	1984	Acrylic on canvas	60 × 60 in
89	Red Dog	1987	Painted steel	37 × 50 × 41 in
95	Toledo	1988	Acrylic on canvas	94 × 146 in
104	Berlin Mural	1986	Mural	Unknown
108-2	Crack Is Wack	1986	Mural	192 × 312 in
109	Tower	1987	Mural	1,100 × 500 in
111	Tuttomondo	1989	Mural	709 × 394 in
112	Figure Balancing on Dog	1989	Painted steel	Unknown
113	Apocalypse	1988	Silkscreen	38 × 38 in
116	Apocalypse	1988	Silkscreen	38 × 38 in
117	Apocalypse	1988	Silkscreen	38 × 38 in
119	The Ten Commandments	1985	Acrylic and oil on canvas	210 × 300 in
120	The Ten Commandments	1985	Acrylic and oil on canvas	210 × 300 in
121	The Ten Commandments	1985	Acrylic and oil on canvas	210 × 300 in
122	The Ten Commandments	1985	Acrylic and oil on canvas	210 × 300 in
123	The Ten Commandments	1985	Acrylic and oil on canvas	210 × 300 in
124	The Ten Commandments	1985	Acrylic and oil on canvas	210 × 300 in
125	The Ten Commandments	1985	Acrylic and oil on canvas	210 × 300 in
126	The Ten Commandments	1985	Acrylic and oil on canvas	210 × 300 in
127	The Ten Commandments	1985	Acrylic and oil on canvas	210 × 300 in
128	The Ten Commandments	1985	Acrylic and oil on canvas	210 × 300 in
129	Apocalypse	1988	Silkscreen	38 × 38 in
130	Glory Hole	1980	Acrylic, spray enamel and ink on paper	48 × 35.5 in
133	Gil	1988	Ink on paper	20 × 20.125 in
134	DJ84	1983	Sumi ink on paper	31 × 42.75 in
139	Corinthian Column by Keith Haring and LA II	1981	DayGlo and ink on wood column	118 × 20 × 20 in
177-2	Keith Haring a Milano... Salvatore Ala. Jun 11-84	1984	Poster	Unknown
182	Apocalypse	1988	Silkscreen	38 × 38 in
187	A Pile of Crowns for Jean-Michel Basquiat	1988	Acrylic on canvas	108 × 120 in
191	Apocalypse	1988	Silkscreen	38 × 38 in
192	The Valley (Page 1)	1989	Etching	10 × 9 in
193	The Valley (Page 2)	1989	Etching	10 × 9 in
194	The Valley (Page 3)	1989	Etching	10 × 9 in
195	The Valley (Page 4)	1989	Etching	10 × 9 in
200	The Valley (Page 5)	1989	Etching	10 × 9 in
202	The Valley (Page 6)	1989	Etching	10 × 9 in
204	The Valley (Page 7)	1989	Etching	10 × 9 in
205	The Valley (Page 8)	1989	Etching	10 × 9 in
206	The Valley (Page 9)	1989	Etching	10 × 9 in
207	The Valley (Page 10)	1989	Etching	10 × 9 in
209	69	1986	Acrylic on canvas	33 × 36 in
210	Self Portrait with Juan	1988	Acrylic on canvas	48 × 36 in
212	The Valley (Page 11)	1989	Etching	10 × 9 in
213	The Valley (Page 12)	1989	Etching	10 × 9 in
214	The Valley (Page 13)	1989	Etching	10 × 9 in
215	The Valley (Page 14)	1989	Etching	10 × 9 in
216	The Valley (Page 15)	1989	Etching	10 × 9 in
217	The Valley (Page 16)	1989	Etching	10 × 9 in
218	BMW Z1	1990	Paint on a BMW Z1	154.4 × 67 × 48.3 in
220-2	Shafrazi Gallery	1984	Sculpture	Unknown
226	Capoeira Dancers	1987	Polyurethane paint on aluminum	28.5 × 28 × 25 in
238	Julia	1987	Painted aluminum sculptures	24 × 19.625 × 14.625 in
241	Barcelona Mural	1989	Mural	Unknown
242	Carmine Street Mural	1989	Mural	Unknown
244	Boys Club Mural	1987	Mural	Unknown
248	Monte Carlo Mural	1989	Mural	Unknown
252	Free South Africa	1985	Poster	Unknown
253	Ignorance = Fear	1989	Poster	24 × 43.25 in
254	Crack Down	1986	Poster	22 × 17.25 in
259	Acrobats	1986	Painted aluminum sculptures	48 × 31.25 × 29 in
269	Self Portrait	1989	Painted aluminum sculptures	48 × 27.5 × 33 in
279	Story of Red and Blue	1989	Lithograph	22 × 16.5 in
280	Story of Red and Blue (#1 – #4)	1989	Lithograph	22 × 16.5 in
281	Story of Red and Blue (#5 – #8)	1989	Lithograph	22 × 16.5 in
282	Story of Red and Blue (#9 – #12)	1989	Lithograph	22 × 16.5 in
283	Story of Red and Blue (#13 – #16)	1989	Lithograph	22 × 16.5 in
284	Story of Red and Blue (#17 – #20)	1989	Lithograph	22 × 16.5 in
304	Shafrazi Gallery Installation	1982	Painting installation	N/A
319-2	Apartheid	1984		120 × 144 in

==== Footnotes ====
^{1}Artwork is in the shape of a circle

=== Untitled works ===
Artwork number	Year	Medium	Dimensions	Notes
1	1979	Chalk on paper	53.5 × 73 in	
2	1978	Sumi ink on paper	20 × 26 in	
3	1979	Ink and acrylic on paper	67 × 94.75 in	
4	1978	Graphite on graph paper	Unknown	
8	1982	Marker ink and acrylic on canvas	86 × 86 in	
9	1982	Acrylic on canvas	96 × 96 in	Made by Haring in collaboration with LA II
10	1982	Vinyl paint on vinyl tarp	73 × 69 in	
11	1982	Vinyl paint on vinyl tarp	84 × 94 in	
12	1983	Vinyl paint on vinyl tarp	120 × 120 in	
13	1984	Acrylic on canvas	94 × 94 in	
14	1984	Acrylic on canvas	60 × 60 in	
15	1984	Acrylic on canvas	120 × 60 in	
17	1985	Acrylic on canvas	120 × 156 in	
18	1985	Acrylic and oil on canvas	120 × 156 in	
19	1986	Acrylic and oil on canvas	96 × 96 in	
20	1986	Acrylic and oil on canvas	96 × 144 in	
21	1986	Enamel paint and acrylic on canvas tarp	84 × 196 in	
22	1988	Acrylic on canvas	120 × 120 in	
24	1989	Acrylic on canvas	40 × 40 in	
26	1989	Acrylic on canvas	40 × 40 in	
32	1989	Enamel and acrylic on canvas	72 × 72 in	
33	1984	Chalk on paper	88.5 × 46 in	
34	1984	Chalk on paper	Unknown	
35	1982	Chalk on paper	Unknown	
36	1982	Chalk on paper	Unknown	
37	1982	Chalk on paper	Unknown	
38	1982	Chalk on paper	Unknown	
39	1982	Chalk on paper	Unknown	
40	1982	Chalk on paper	Unknown	
41	1982	Chalk on paper	Unknown	
42	1982	Chalk on paper	Unknown	
43	1982	Chalk on paper	Unknown	
44	1982	Chalk on paper	Unknown	
45	1982	Chalk on paper	Unknown	
46	1982	Chalk on paper	Unknown	
47	1982	Chalk on paper	Unknown	
48	1982	Chalk on paper	88 × 45 in	
49	1982	Chalk on paper	87 × 46 in	
50	1983	Chalk on paper	87 × 46 in	
51	1983	Chalk on paper	86.75 × 45 in	
52	1983	Chalk on paper	49 × 68 in	
53	1983	Chalk on paper	87.25 × 45.25 in	
54	1983	Chalk on paper	87 × 45 in	
55	1983	Chalk on paper	49 × 68 in	
56	1984	Chalk on paper	87.25 × 45.25 in	
57	1984	Chalk on paper	87.25 × 45.25 in	
58	1984	Chalk on paper	Unknown	
59	1984	Chalk on paper	Unknown	
60	1985	Chalk on paper	Unknown	
61	1982	Chalk on paper	Unknown	
62	1984	Acrylic on muslin	47.5 × 60 in	
63	1984	Acrylic on canvas	120 × 120 in	
64	1984	DayGlo on muslin	94 × 94 in	
66	1984	Acrylic on muslin	94 × 94 in	
67	1985	Acrylic on canvas	300 × 383 in	Also known as "Palladium Backdrop"
70	1986	Acrylic on canvas	59 × 59 in	
71	1986	Acrylic and oil on canvas	96 × 96 in	
72	1986	Acrylic and oil on canvas	96 × 96 in	
75	1983	Ink on paper	41 × 52 in	
76	1984	Gouache and black ink on paper	72 × 37.5 in	
77	1984	Gouache and black ink on paper	72 × 37.5 in	
78	1984	Gouache and black ink on paper	72 × 37.5 in	
79	1984	Gouache and black ink on paper	72 × 37.5 in	
81	1985	Chalk on paper	45 × 60	
82	1984	Chalk on paper	80 × 42 in	
83	1985	Acrylic on canvas	48 × 48 in	
86	1985	Acrylic on canvas	48 × 48 in	
87	1989	Acrylic on canvas	38 × 72 in	Also known as "For James Ensor"
88	1987	Paint on paper	26 × 40 in	
90	1984	Acrylic on paper	114 × 157 in	
92	1988	Acrylic on canvas	10 ft in diameter	Artwork is in the shape of a circle
93	1987	Acrylic on canvas	96 × 192 in	
94	1984	DayGlo on muslin	40 × 40 in	
96	1985	Ink on paper	23 × 23 in	
97	1988	Sumi ink on paper	26 × 40 in	
98	1988	Acrylic on canvas	96 × 96 in	
99	1989	Sumi ink on paper	38 × 50 in	
100	1984	Encaustic on wood	Unknown	
101	1984	Encaustic on wood	Unknown	
102	1984	Encaustic on wood	Unknown	
103	1987	Mural	Unknown	Located in the Museum of Contemporary Art in Antwerp
107	1989	Mural	Unknown	Located in Chicago; also known as "The Chicago Mural"
114	1989	Acrylic on canvas	36 × 72 in	Also known as "For James Ensor 2"
115	1980	Acrylic, spray enamel and ink on paper	44.5 × 54 in	
118	1978	Black ink on paper	114 × 106 in	
131-2	1985	Acrylic on canvas	120 × 120 in	
132	1985	Synthetic polymer, DayGlo and acrylic on canvas	Unknown	Also known as "Madonna;" made by Haring in collaboration with Andy Warhol
135	1989	Sumi ink on paper	30 × 22.25 in	
136	1989	Sumi ink on paper	30 × 22.25 in	
137	1989	Sumi ink on paper	30 × 22.25 in	
138	1981	Sumi ink and acrylic on paper	107 × 186 in	
140	1981	DayGlo and acrylic on wood	4 ft in diameter	Artwork is in the shape of a circle
141	1982	Enamel and DayGlo on metal	72 × 1.5 × 90.5 in	
142-2	1982	Enamel and DayGlo on metal	72 × 1.5 × 90.5 in	
143	1982	Enamel and DayGlo on metal	72 × 1.5 × 90.5 in	
144	1989	Gouache and black ink on paper	24.875 × 28.5 in	
145	1989	Gouache and black ink on paper	24.875 × 28.5 in	
146	1989	Gouache and black ink on paper	24.875 × 28.5 in	
147	1989	Gouache and black ink on paper	24.875 × 28.5 in	
148	1989	Gouache and black ink on paper	24.875 × 28.5 in	
149	1989	Gouache and black ink on paper	24.875 × 28.5 in	
150	1989	Gouache and black ink on paper	24.875 × 28.5 in	
151	1989	Gouache and black ink on paper	24.875 × 28.5 in	
152	1989	Gouache and black ink on paper	24.875 × 28.5 in	
153	1989	Gouache and black ink on paper	24.875 × 28.5 in	
154	1989	Gouache and black ink on paper	24.875 × 28.5 in	
155	1989	Gouache and black ink on paper	24.875 × 28.5 in	
156	1989	Gouache and black ink on paper	24.875 × 28.5 in	
157	1989	Gouache and black ink on paper	24.875 × 28.5 in	
158	1989	Gouache and black ink on paper	24.875 × 28.5 in	
159	1989	Gouache and black ink on paper	24.875 × 28.5 in	
160	1989	Gouache and black ink on paper	24.875 × 28.5 in	
161	1980	Black ink on poster board	48 × 90.625 in	
162	1980	Black ink on poster board	48 × 91.625 in	
163	1980	Sumi ink on paper	20 × 27.125 in	Part of the "8 Untitled Drawings" series
167	1980	Sumi ink on paper	20 × 27.125 in	Part of the "8 Untitled Drawings" series
168	1980	Sumi ink on paper	20 × 27.125 in	Part of the "8 Untitled Drawings" series
169	1980	Sumi ink on paper	20 × 27.125 in	Part of the "8 Untitled Drawings" series
170	1980	Sumi ink on paper	20 × 27.125 in	Part of the "8 Untitled Drawings" series
171	1980	Sumi ink on paper	20 × 27.125 in	Part of the "8 Untitled Drawings" series
172	1980	Sumi ink on paper	20 × 27.125 in	Part of the "8 Untitled Drawings" series
174	1980	Sumi ink on paper	20 × 27.125 in	Part of the "8 Untitled Drawings" series
164	1988	Gouache and Sumi ink on paper	30 × 40 in	
165	1980	Spray paint, acrylic and black ink on paper	48 × 67.5	
166	1981	Sumi ink on paper	38 × 50 in	
175	1984	DayGlo on muslin	Unknown	
176	1984	DayGlo on muslin	Unknown	
178	1984	DayGlo on plaster	Unknown	Made by Haring in collaboration with LA II
179	1989	Sumi ink on paper	38 × 50 in	
180	1984	DayGlo on muslin	Unknown	
181	1984	DayGlo on muslin	Unknown	
183	1984	Acrylic on canvas	50 × 119.75 in	
184	1984	DayGlo on plaster	Unknown	
185	1984	Marker on terracotta	Unknown	Also known as "Untitled Vases"
186	1988	Acrylic on canvas	60 × 60 in	Also known as "Untitled No. 8"
188	1981	Marker ink on fiberglass	40 × 28 in	
189	1984	Marker on terracotta	30.5 × 22 × 22 in	
190	1983	Body painting	Unknown	
196-2	1984	Body painting	Unknown	
197-2	1984	Body painting	Unknown	
198-2	1984	Body painting	Unknown	
199-2	1984	Body painting	Unknown	
203	1981	Body painting	Unknown	
211	1984	Vinyl paint on vinyl tarp	72 × 72 in	
219	1980	Mixed media, collage	Unknown	
221	1978	Pen and ink in sketchbook	8 × 10 in	
222	1980	Mixed media, collage	Unknown	
223	1980	Mixed media, collage	Unknown	
224	1980	Acrylic, spray enamel and ink on paper	Unknown	
225	1982	Mural	Unknown	Located at Houston Street in New York; no longer exists
227	1982	Vinyl ink on vinyl tarpaulin	72 × 72 in	
228	1983	Chalk on paper	28.5 × 28.5 in	
235	1989	Painted aluminum sculptures	120 × 155.625 × 113.375 in	Also known as "Two Dancing Figures"
237	1987	Painted aluminum sculptures	24 × 18.25 × 12 in	Also known as "Ringed Figure"
238	1987	Painted aluminum sculptures	24 × 15.75 × 14.875 in	Also known as "S-MAN"
255	1982	Vinyl paint on vinyl tarp	72 × 72 in	
256	1984	Acrylic on canvas	94 × 282 in	
257	1984	Acrylic on canvas	60 x.119.75 in	
258	1985	Acrylic and oil on canvas	120 × 180 in	
260	1981	Sumi ink on paper	38 × 50 in	
261	1982	Ink on paper	72 × 66 in	
262	1983	Gouache and black ink on paper	38 × 49.625 in	
263	1983	Gouache and black ink on paper	37.375 × 71.625 in	
264	1983	Gouache and black ink on paper	37.375 × 71.625 in	
265	1984	Gouache and black ink on paper	32 × 39.75 in	
266	1984	Gouache and black ink on paper	22.875 × 28.75 in	
267	1984	Gouache and black ink on paper	24 × 36 in	
268	1984	Gouache and black ink on paper	23.625 × 35.375 in	
270	1987	Painted aluminum sculptures	48 × 27.5 × 33 in	Also known as "Figure on Baby"
271	1980	Ink on paper	48 × 43 in	
272	1981	Ink on vellum	43 × 48 in	
273	1981	Ink on vellum	42 × 54 in	
274	1981	Ink on vellum	39.5 × 48 in	
275	1981	Ink on vellum	41.25 × 52 in	
276	1981	Ink on vellum	41.75 × 59.5 in	
277	1981	Ink on vellum	41.25 × 46.75 in	
278	1981	Marking pen	42.25 × 46.75 in	
285	1981	Ink on vellum	42 × 49 in	
286	1981	Ink on vellum	41 × 57 in	
287	1981	Ink on vellum	41.5 × 52 in	
288	1981	Acrylic and marker on metal	47.25 × 47.25 in	Made by Haring in collaboration with LA II
289	1981	Acrylic and marker on metal	24.5 × 21 in	
290	1981	Acrylic on vinyl	96 × 96 in	
291	1981	Acrylic on vinyl	96 × 96 in	
292-2	1981	Marking pen on drum	29 × 14 in	
293	1982	Acrylic on canvas	3.9375 ft in diameter	Artwork is in the shape of a circle
294	1982	Acrylic on canvas	96 × 96 in	
295	1982	Vinyl ink on vinyl tarpaulin	72 × 72 in	
296	1982	Vinyl ink on vinyl tarpaulin	80.75 × 80.75 in	Made by Haring in collaboration with LA II
297	1982	Vinyl ink on vinyl tarpaulin	144 × 144 in	
298	1982	Vinyl ink on vinyl tarpaulin	144 × 144 in	
299	1982	Vinyl ink on vinyl tarpaulin	84 × 84 in	
300	1982	Vinyl ink on vinyl tarpaulin	108.25 × 108.25 in	
301	1982	Ink and acrylic on paper	182 × 290 cm	
302	1983	Acrylic on tarp	68 × 68 in	
303	1985	Acrylic on fiberglass sculpture	33 × 16.5 × 10.5 in	
305	1983	Ink on paper	43 × 50.75 in	
306	1983	Ink on paper	43 × 50.75 in	
307	1983	Ink on paper	43 × 50.75 in	
308	1983	Ink on paper	43 × 50.75 in	
309	1983	Ink on paper	43 × 50.75 in	
310	1983	Ink on paper	73.25 × 101.5 in	
311	1983	Marking pen on terracotta	42.25 × 31.5 × 31.5 in	
312	1983	Encaustic on wood	35 × 36 × 2.5 in	
313	1983	Acrylic on canvas	63 × 63 in	
314-2	1983	Acrylic on canvas	63 × 63 in	
315	1983	Acrylic on canvas	63 × 63 in	
316	1984	Acrylic on canvas	94.5 × 94.5 in	
317	1984	Acrylic on canvas	60 × 60 in	
318	1984	Acrylic on canvas	39.5 × 39.5 in	
320	1984	Encaustic on wood	85 × 78.75 in	
321	1984	Encaustic on wood	137.75 × 35.5	
