= Brudziński =

Brudziński/ Brudzinski (feminine: Brudzińska, plural: Brudzińscy) is a Polish surname

== People ==
- Bob Brudzinski (born 1955), American football linebacker
- Grzegorz Brudziński (born 1959), Polish referee
- Joachim Brudziński (born 1968), Polish Minister of the Interior, Deputy Marshal of the Sejm
- Józef Brudziński (1874–1917), Polish pediatrician
- Magdalena Brudzińska, Sirrah (band) violinist
- Tadeusz Brudziński (1902–1960), Polish engineer
- Zygmunt Brudziński (1905–1959), Polish–Soviet War and Silesian Uprisings soldier

== Other ==
- Brudziński's sign, medical signs which may occur in meningitis or meningism

== See also ==
- Brodziński
