= Józef Brudziński =

Polish pediatrician (1874–1917)

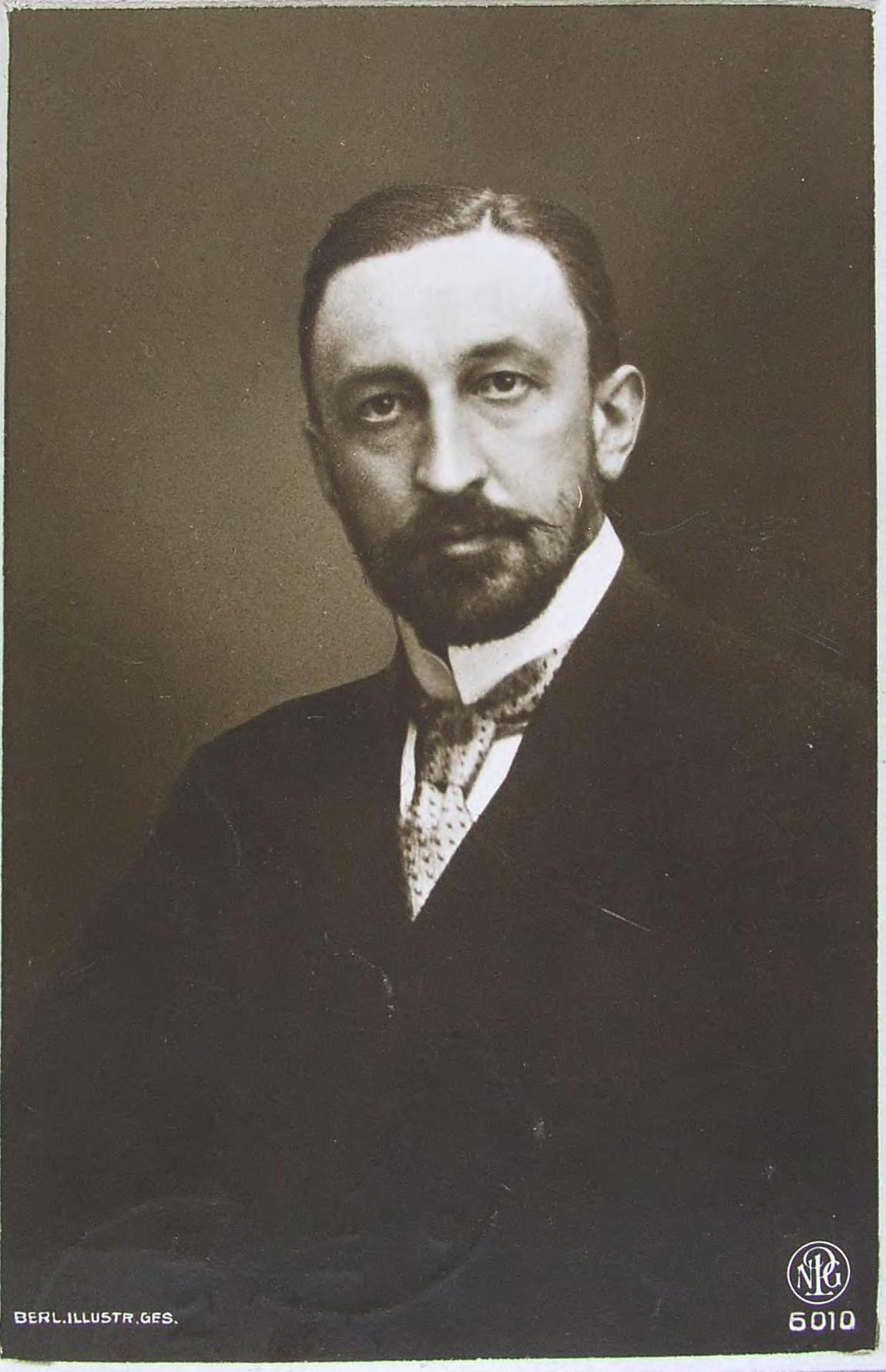
- Brudziński c. 1910
- Born: Józef Polikarp Brudziński; 26 January 1874; Bolewo, Poland
- Died: 18 December 1917 (aged 43); Warsaw, Poland
- Occupation: Pediatrician

Józef Polikarp Brudziński (26 January 1874 – 18 December 1917) was a Polish pediatrician born in the village of Bolewo (now in Mława County).

== Biography ==
He studied medicine in Tartu and Moscow, and in 1897 moved to Kraków, where he trained in pediatrics. Later, he worked in Graz under Theodor Escherich (1867–1911), and in Paris with Doctors Jacques-Joseph Grancher (1843–1907), Antoine Marfan (1858–1942) and Victor Henri Hutinel (1849–1933).

In 1903 he practiced medicine at the Anne-Marie Kinderhospital in Łódź, relocating in 1910 to Warsaw, where he designed a children's hospital with financial assistance from philanthropist Sophie Szlenker. He was a catalyst in the re-establishment of a Polish university in Warsaw, where in 1915, he became rector. In 1908 he founded the first Polish journal of pediatrics, titled Przegląd Pediatryczny.

Brudziński is remembered for his work involving prophylaxis of infectious diseases in children, as well as studies of neurological indications associated with meningitis. Today, his name is lent to four eponymous medical signs associated with reflexes observed in meningitis.

- Brudziński's neck sign: With the patient lying on his back and the neck is bent forward, reflective flexion of the knees take place.
- Brudziński's symphyseal sign: Pressure over symphysis pubis leads to knee, hip flexion and leg abduction.
- Brudziński's cheek phenomenon: Pressure beneath the zygomatic bone leads to flexion of the forearm.
- Brudziński's reflex: Passive flexion of one knee into the abdomen leads to involuntary flexion in the opposite leg, and stretching of a limb that was flexed leads to contralateral extension.

He died on December 18, 1917, at only 43 years of age due to nephrotic syndrome.
