= Meningism =

Symptoms similar to meningitis but not caused by meningitis

- Other names: Meningismus, pseudomeningitis
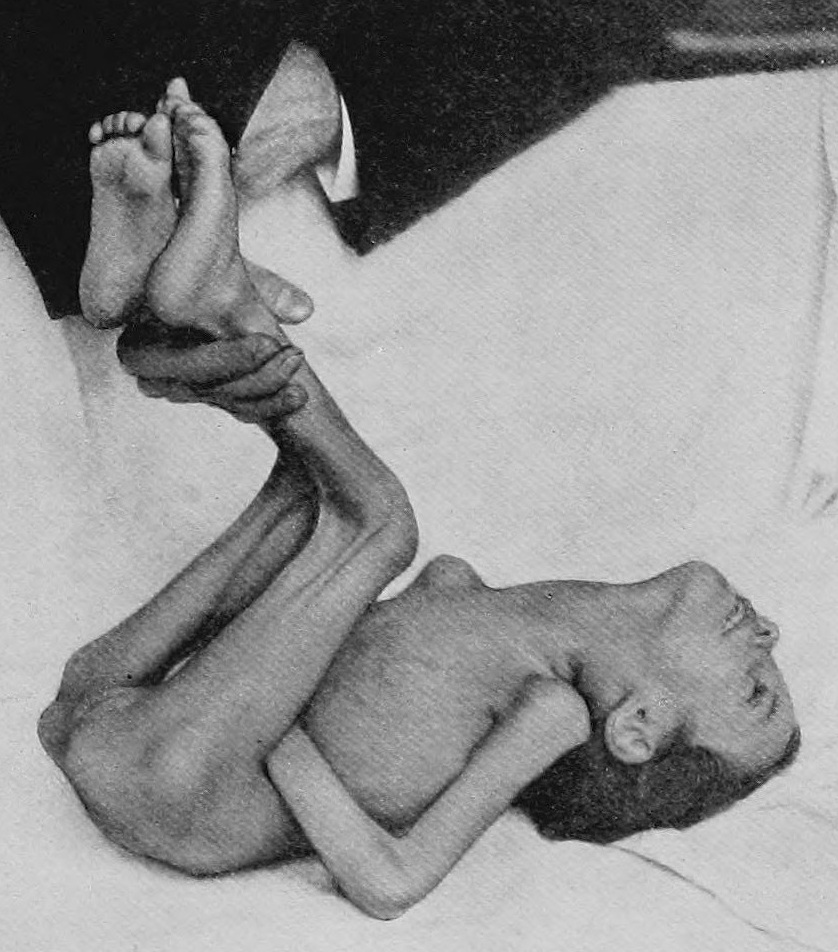
- Positive Kernig's sign in cerebrospinal meningitis
- Differential diagnosis: Meningitis

Meningism is a set of symptoms similar to those of meningitis but not caused by meningitis. Whereas meningitis is inflammation of the meninges (membranes that cover the central nervous system), meningism is caused by nonmeningitic irritation of the meninges, usually associated with acute febrile illness, especially in children and adolescents. Meningism involves the triad (3-symptom syndrome) of nuchal rigidity (neck stiffness), photophobia (intolerance of bright light) and headache. It therefore requires differentiating from other CNS problems with similar symptoms, including meningitis and some types of intracranial hemorrhage. Related clinical signs include Kernig's sign and three signs all named Brudzinski's sign.

Although nosologic coding systems, such as ICD-10 and MeSH, define meningism/meningismus as meningitis-like but in fact not meningitis, many physicians use the term meningism in a loose sense clinically to refer to any meningitis-like set of symptoms before the cause is definitively known. In this sense, the word implies "suspected meningitis". The words meningeal symptoms can be used instead to avoid ambiguity, thus reserving the term meningism for its strict sense.

== Signs and symptoms ==
The main clinical signs that indicate meningism are nuchal rigidity, Kernig's sign and Brudzinski's signs. None of the signs are particularly sensitive; in adults with meningitis, nuchal rigidity was present in 30% and Kernig's or Brudzinski's sign only in 5%.

=== Nuchal rigidity ===
Nuchal rigidity is the inability to flex the neck forward due to rigidity of the neck muscles; if flexion of the neck is painful but full range of motion is present, nuchal rigidity is absent.

=== Kernig's sign ===
Kernig's sign (after Waldemar Kernig (1840–1917), a Russian neurologist) is positive when the thigh is flexed at the hip and knee at 90 degree angles, and subsequent extension in the knee is painful (leading to resistance). This may indicate subarachnoid hemorrhage or meningitis. Patients may also show opisthotonus—spasm of the whole body that leads to legs and head being bent back and body bowed forward.

=== Brudzinski's signs ===
Jozef Brudzinski (1874–1917), a Polish pediatrician, is credited with several signs in meningitis. The most commonly used sign (Brudzinski's neck sign) is positive when the forced flexion of the neck elicits a reflex flexion of the hips, with the patient lying supine.

Other signs attributed to Brudzinski:

- The symphyseal sign, in which pressure on the pubic symphysis leads to abduction of the leg and reflexive hip and knee flexion.
- The cheek sign, in which pressure on the cheek below the zygoma leads to rising and flexion in the forearm.
- Brudzinski's reflex, in which passive flexion of one knee into the abdomen leads to involuntary flexion in the opposite leg, and stretching of a limb that was flexed leads to contralateral extension.

== See also ==
- Meningitis
- Meningoencephalitis
