= Brodziński =

Brodziński/ Brodzinski (feminine: Brodzińska/ Brodzinska, plural: Brodzińscy) is a Polish surname and may refer to:

- Anna Brodzińska, fashion designer
- Anne Brodzinsky, Zach Braff mother
- Bryce Brodzinski (born 2000), hockey player, drafted in 2019 NHL entry draft by Philadelphia Flyers
- Darryl J. Brodzinski, Undeniable: Live at Blues Alley executive producer
- Easton Brodzinski (born 1996), hockey player
- Grażyna Brodzińska (born 1951), Polish soprano, opera and operetta singer, and musical actress
- Greg Brodzinski, Philadelphia Phillies bullpen catcher coach
- Irena Brodzińska, First female law students in Poland (upon their admittance to the University of Warsaw in 1915)
- Jonny Brodzinski (born 1993), hockey player
- Kazimierz Brodziński (1791–1835), Polish Romantic poet
- Leopold Brodziński (1894–1942), Polish actor, writer, murdered in Auschwitz concentration camp
- Michael Brodzinski (born 1995), hockey player, drafted in 2013 NHL entry draft by San Jose Sharks
- Mike Brodzinski (born 1964), hockey player, father of Bryce, Easton, Jonny and Michael
- Witold Brodziński, Polish Reformed Church president consistory

== See also ==
- Brudziński
