= Tuttomondo =

Mural by Keith Haring in Pisa, Italy

- English: All World
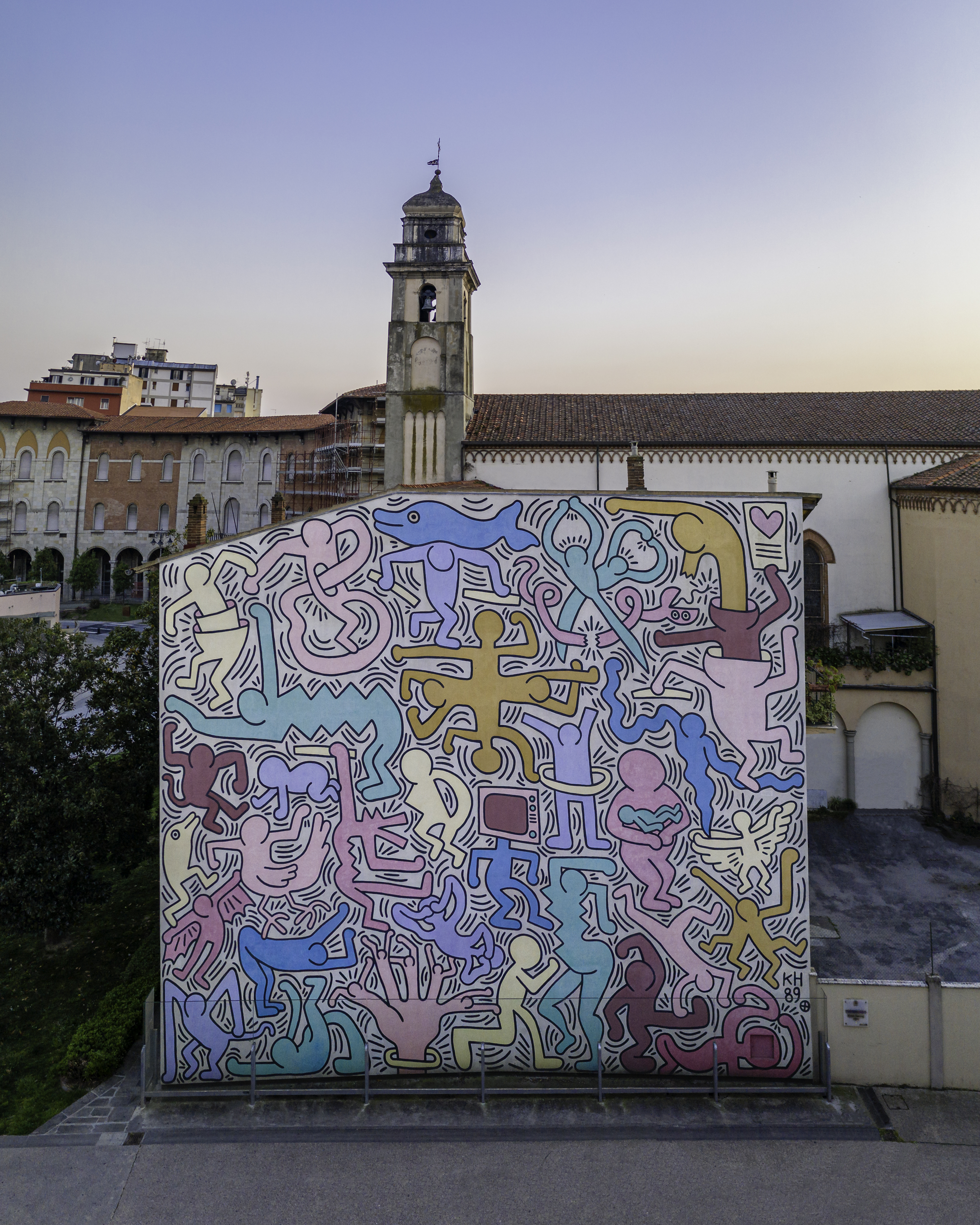
- Artist: Keith Haring
- Year: 1989
- Movement: Pop art
- Location: Pisa, Italy

Tuttomondo (English: All World) is a mural created by American artist Keith Haring in 1989. Located on the rear wall of the Sant'Antonio Abate church in Pisa, it is one of the last public murals executed before his death from AIDS-related complications in 1990. It is also one of the few outdoor public works created by Haring for permanent display.

== Background ==
Italian university student Piergiorgio Castellani met artist Keith Haring on the streets of the East Village, Manhattan during his winter-break in 1988. Known for being approachable and creating public murals in international locations such as the Tower at Necker Children's Hospital in Paris about the Berlin Wall, Castellani invited Haring to "create an impactful work of art" in Pisa, which they began planning at Haring's Broadway Street studio in SoHo the next day. In 1989, Castellani's family arranged with the City of Pisa for Haring to realize what he later called one of his most important projects.

== Installation ==
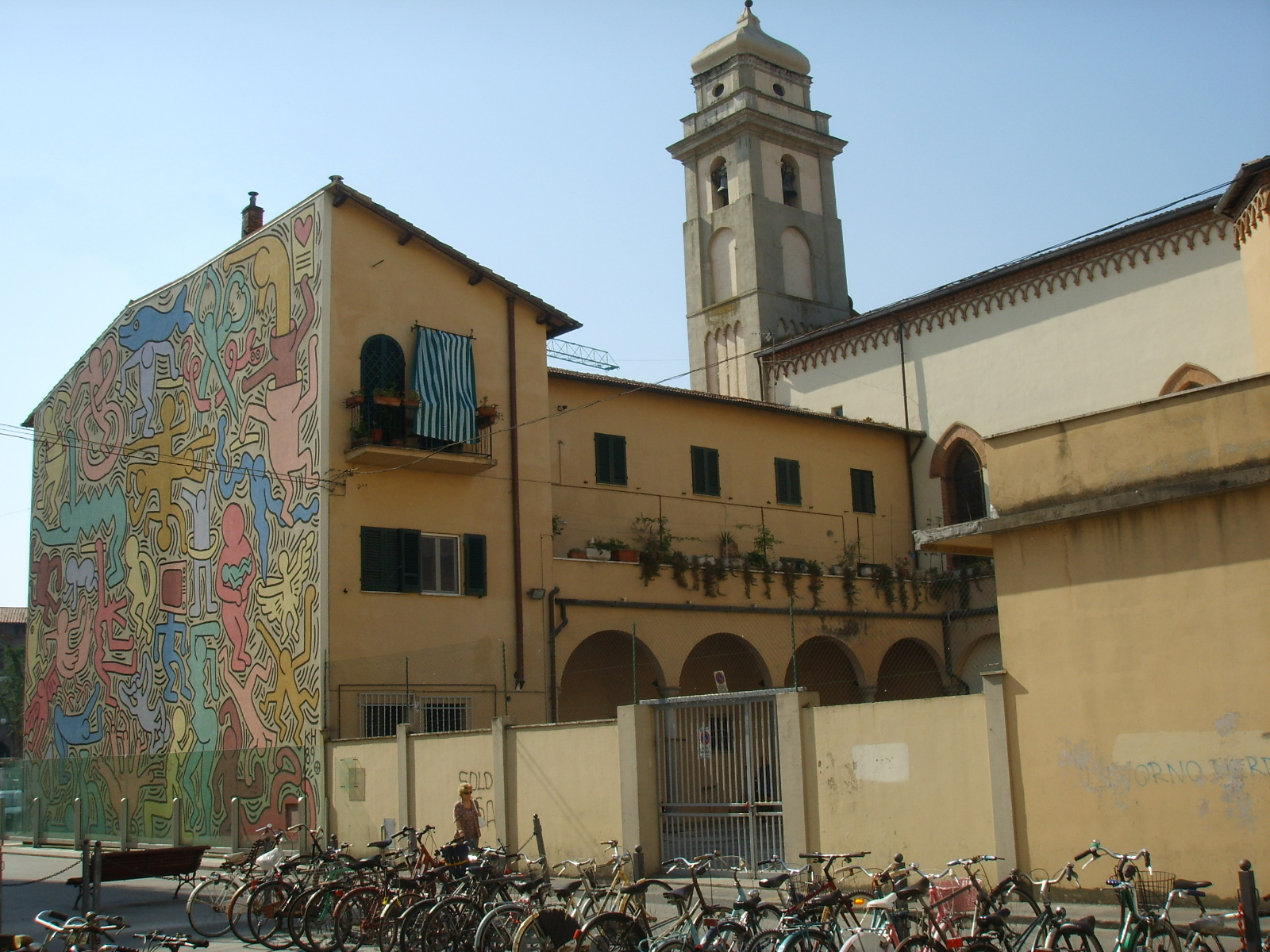
The Tuttomondo mural and the church of Sant'Antonio Abate

In June 1989, Haring created the 180-square meter mural on the exterior southern wall of the Church of Sant'Antonio Abate. The mural took a week to complete. "Every day there would be more and more people." Haring later recalled. "When I put my last stroke on the wall, it all seems incredibly Felliniesque. It all seems utterly unreal–beyond anything I had ever experienced before."

The mural depicts 30 figures painted in Haring' cartoon-like style with an overarching theme of peace and harmony: "The 'human' scissors are the image of solidarity between Man in defeating the serpent (that is evil), which is already eating the arm of the figure next to it; the woman with a baby in her arms represents maternity, and the two men supporting the dolphin refer to Man's relationship with nature."

Tuttomondo is often erroneously referred to Haring's last public work, but he created another mural a few months later at the ArtCenter College of Design in Pasadena in November 1989. After its completion, Haring gave the vineyard owning Castellani family an original drawing that could be used as a wine label. For the 30th anniversary of the mural in 2019, they used it on a line of Super Tuscan wines to benefit the artist residency program at Materia Prima.

== Restoration ==
In 2012, the mural was restored by the Department of Public Works of the Municipality of Pisa.
