= Sant'Antonio Abate, Pisa =

Church building in Pisa, Italy

Coordinates: 43°42′40″N 10°23′51″E

Church of Sant'Antonio Abate
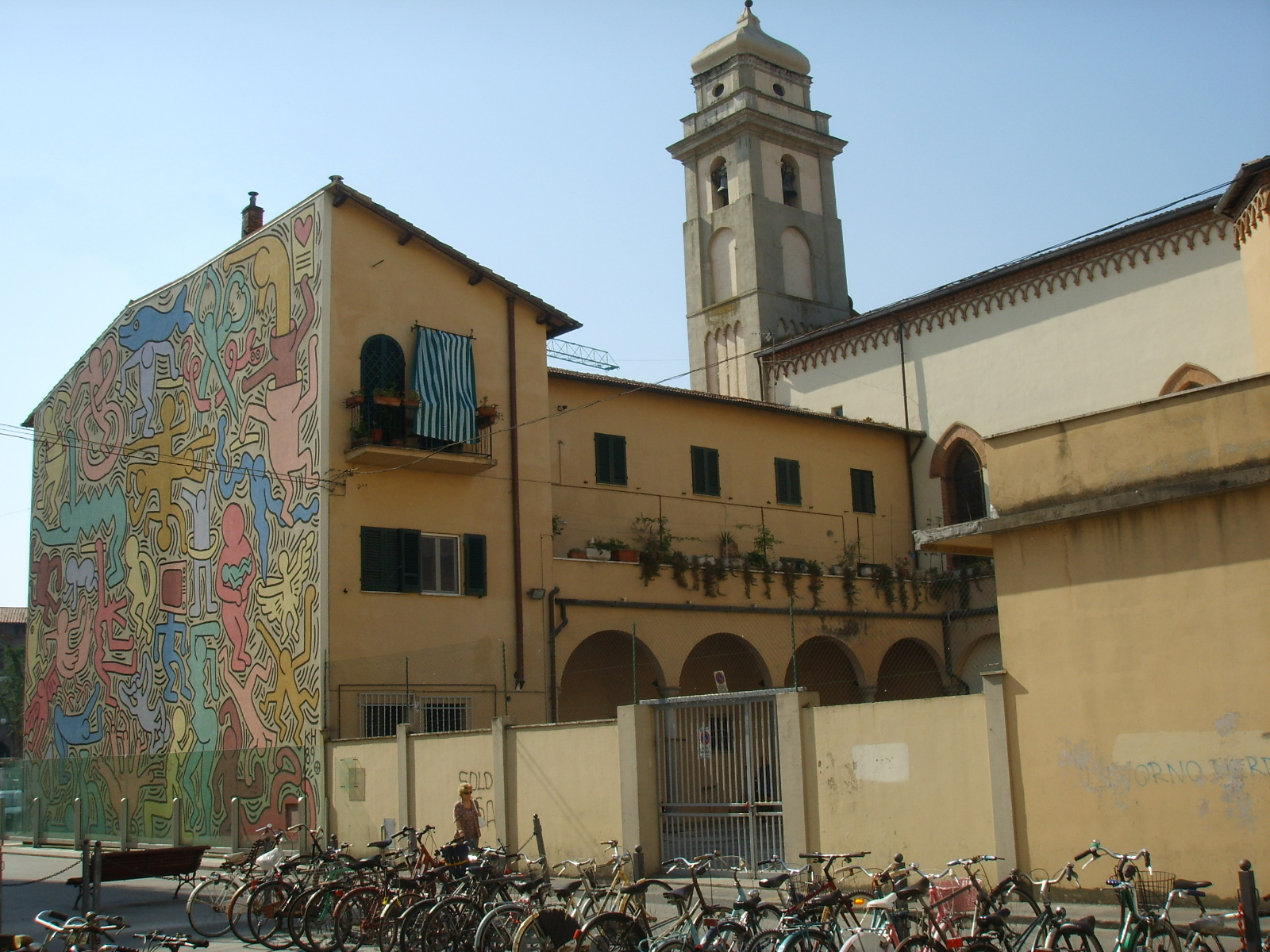
- Side of church with mural by Keith Haring

- Location within Italy

Religion
- Affiliation: Roman Catholic
- Province: Pisa

Location
- Location: Pisa, Italy
- Coordinates: {

Architecture
- Type: Church
- Style: Romanesque
- Groundbreaking: 13th century

Sant'Antonio Abate is a Romanesque-style, Roman Catholic church, located facing Piazza Sant'Antonio in Pisa, region of Tuscany, Italy.

== History ==
The church was founded in 1341 with an adjacent convent. It was nearly destroyed during World War II, and was rebuilt after the war. The inferior façade, in two colors of marble, was the design product of Lupo, Giovanni di Gante, and Simone di Matteo of Siena.

=== Mural ===
On a rear wall of the convent, facing Via Zandonai, is a vast 1989 mural, titled Tuttomondo, by Keith Haring. The mural was one of the last public works by Haring.

== Gallery ==
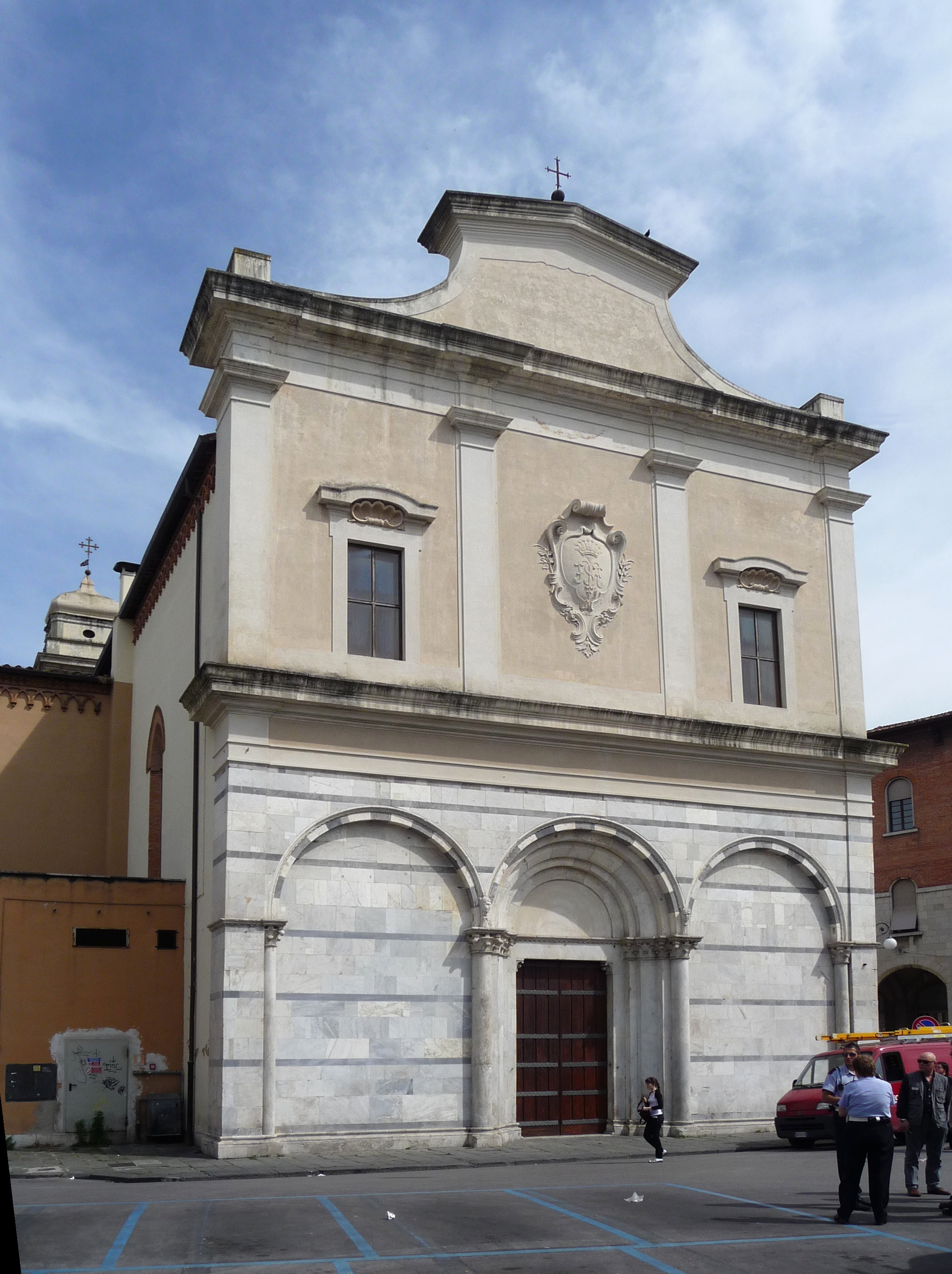
Facade

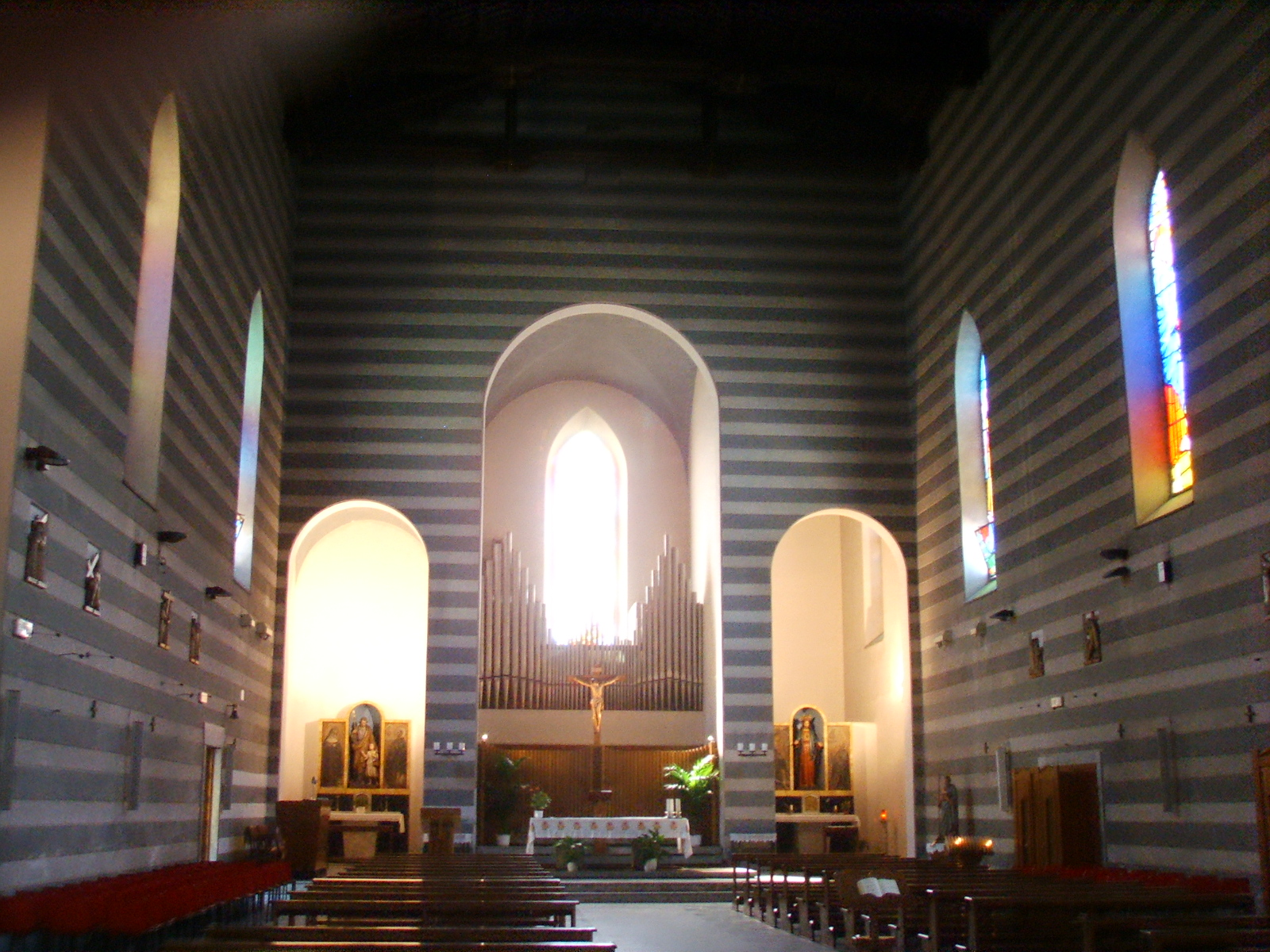
Interior

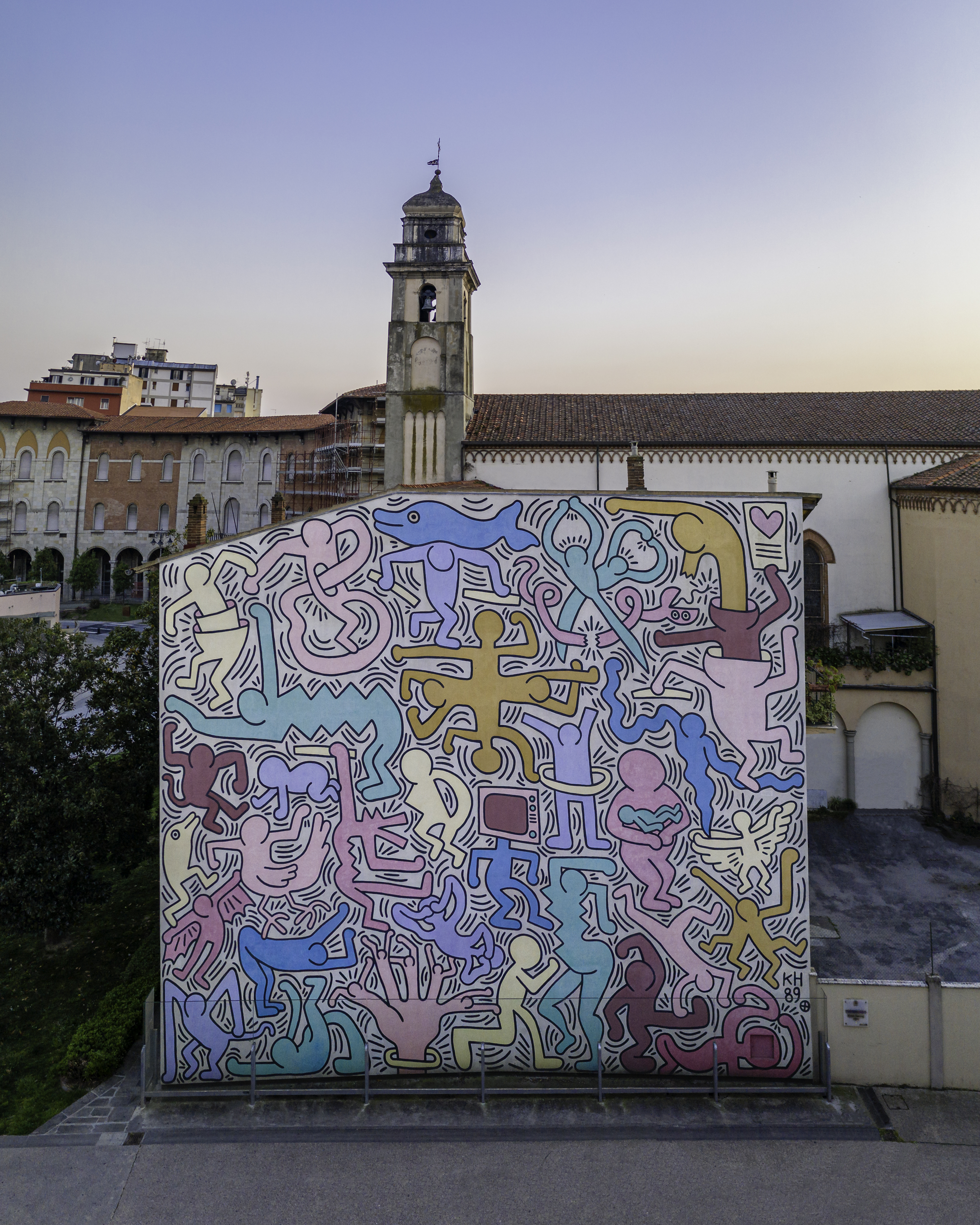
Keith Haring, Tuttomondo, 1989
