= Bolewo =

- Village
- Location within Poland
- Coordinates: 52°59′N 20°27′E
- Country: Poland
- Voivodeship: Masovian
- County: Mława
- Gmina: Stupsk

Bolewo [bɔˈlɛvɔ] is a village in the administrative district of Gmina Stupsk, within Mława County, Masovian Voivodeship, in east-central Poland.
