= Necker–Enfants Malades Hospital =

Coordinates: 48°50′42″N 2°18′56″E

- Assistance Publique – Hôpitaux de Paris
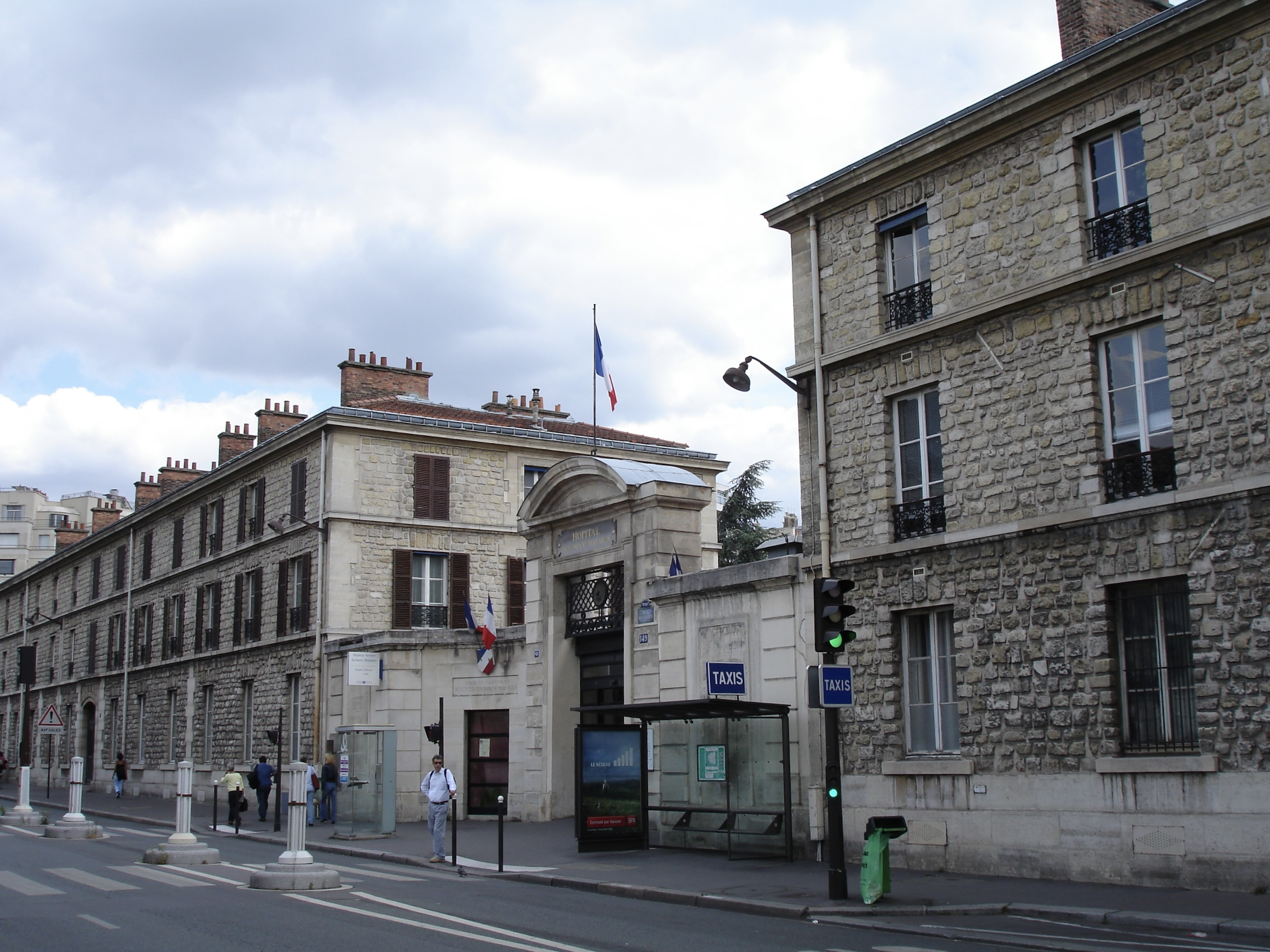

Geography
- Location: 149 rue de Sèvres; 75015 Paris, France

Organisation
- Type: Teaching
- Affiliated university: Paris Cité University

Services
- Emergency department: Yes
- Beds: 600
- Speciality: Pediatrics

History
- Founded: 1920 by merger of Necker Hospital (founded 1778) and Sick Children's Hospital (founded 1801)

Links
- Website: hopital-necker.aphp.fr
- Lists: Hospitals in France

The Necker–Enfants Malades Hospital (French: Hôpital Necker-Enfants Malades [opital nɛkɛʁ ɑ̃fɑ̃ malad]) is a French teaching hospital in the 15th arrondissement of Paris. It is a hospital of the Assistance Publique – Hôpitaux de Paris group and is affiliated to the Université Paris Cité. Necker–Enfants Malades Hospital was created in 1920 by the merger of Necker Hospital (Hôpital Necker), which was founded in 1778 by Suzanne Necker, with the physically contiguous Sick Children's Hospital (Hôpital des Enfants Malades), the oldest children's hospital in the Western world, founded in 1801.

== History ==
The Hôpital Necker was founded in 1778 by Madame Necker, born Suzanne Curchod, mother of Madame de Staël and wife of Jacques Necker, Louis XVI's finance minister. Jacques Necker was a leader in the movement to reform crowded hospitals by building smaller treatment centers closer to the patients' neighborhoods. Madame Necker subsequently remodeled an old monastery into the hospital, which prior to the French Revolution was known as the Hospice de Charité. It was a Catholic institution where a baptism certificate and a confession were requirements for admission. Many poor parishioners would come to the hospital for their last rites before death. Hospitals at the time were seen as "gates to heaven" which were run by the Catholic Sisters of Charity, rather than the scientific institutions run by doctors they would later become. Male and female patients were kept separate from each other, as many hospitals of the time did. Triage procedures, established all over Paris in 1802, systematically excluded pregnant women, the mentally ill, and venereal patients. Patients were divided into four categories: fever, malignant fever, surgical, and convalescent. At the hospital, the first ever therapeutic bacteriophages were applied in the year 1919.

The Hôpital des Enfants Malades (Hospital for Sick Children), not to be confused with the foundling hospital, the Hôpital des Enfants Trouvés, was created by the Conseil général des Hospices (General Hospices Council) in January 1801 to help manage the health and social structures of Paris. With the aim of reorganising the hospital, the Council proposed a new classification based on the common distinction between hospitals and special hospitals and announced the creation of a hospital "for the children of both sexes under the age of fifteen years" (4 December 1801). The newly formed Hôpital des Enfants Malades opened in June 1802 on the site of the previous orphanage hospital Hôpital de l'Enfant Jésus ("Baby Jesus hospital"). It was the first paediatric hospital in the Western world.

The two physically contiguous hospitals were merged in 1920, but the Necker division continued to care for adults and Enfants malades for children.

== Mural ==
In 1987, American artist, Keith Haring, created a mural named Tower, covering a stairwell of the hospital. He painted the mural while in Paris for the 10th anniversary exhibition of American artists at the Centre Georges Pompidou.

The stairwell became derelict over time and paint worn off and was condemned by hospital's administrators. However, it was conserved and fully restored in September 2017. The attached surgery center the stairwell had once attached to had been demolished and a new hospital building had been constructed. The mural now stands as a "totem" and centerpiece of the hospital gardens.

== Famous Physicians ==
French physician René Laennec invented the stethoscope in 1816 while he was working at the Hôpital Necker. Previously, doctors placed their heads directly on their patient's chest and listened for any irregular sounds to aid in diagnosis. But when a large young woman came to the hospital, he realized that this method would be less effective given her size. Instead, he used a tightly rolled up piece of paper to press against the patient's chest, which made the heartbeat much clearer than ever before. Further experimentation yielded Laennec's famous hollow wooden tube, the forerunner of today's stethoscopes. His invention's ability to magnify the internal sounds of the body advanced the medical practice of auscultation, and proved beneficial to the Hôpital Necker, which had a high fatality rate for Phthisis pulmonalis. This was because Laennec discovered with his stethoscope that patients who developed the disease first displayed a particular irregularity how their voices were manifested within their bodies, thus allowing patients to be diagnosed earlier.

Among eminent physicians working at the Hôpital des Enfants Malades were Auguste Chaillou, Eugène Bouchut, Director Jacques-Joseph Grancher), Director Victor Henri Hutinel, Eugène Apert and Édouard Kirmisson.

== Gallery ==
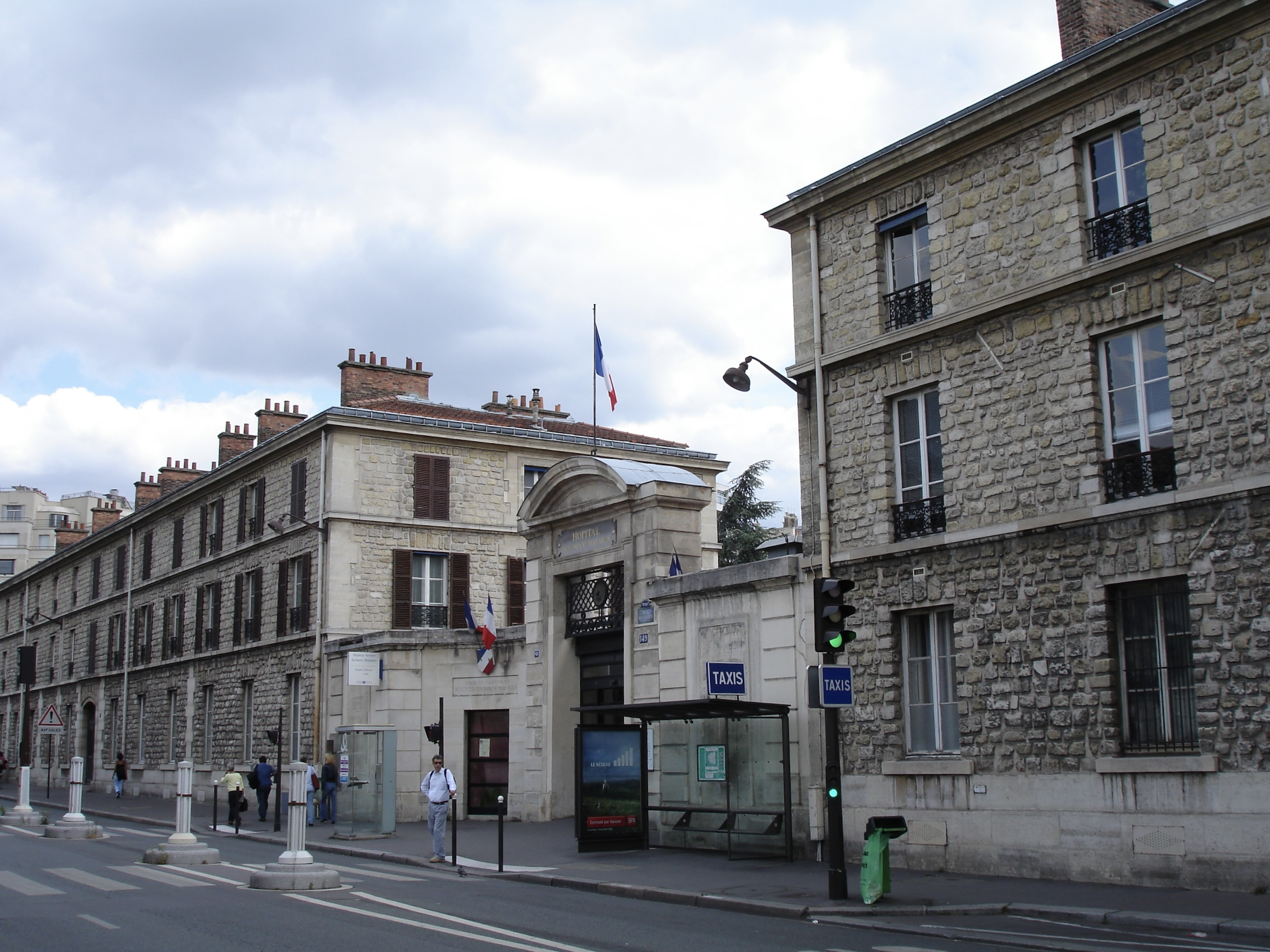
The entrance of Hôpital des Enfants malades in Rue de Sèvres.

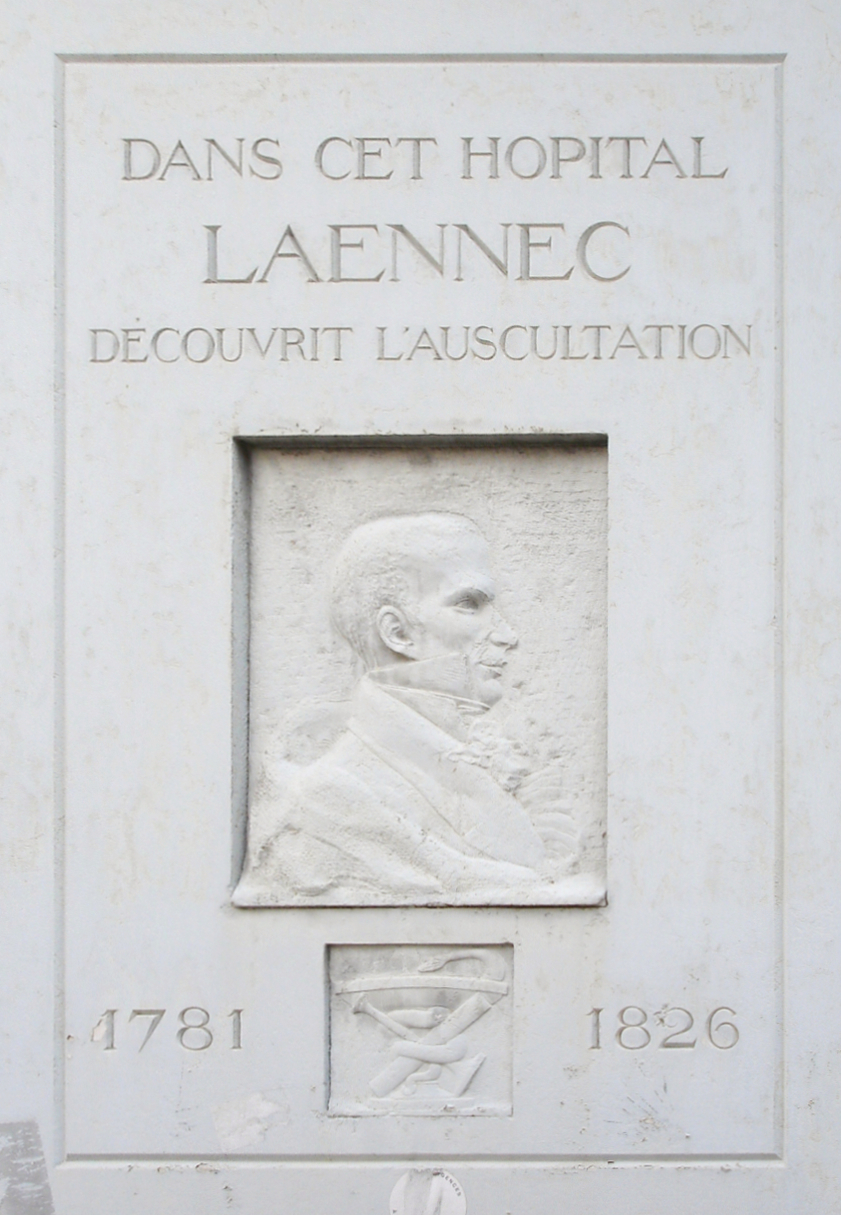
Laennec's memorial tablet in the front of the old hospital. "Here, Laennec discovered the Stethoscope".

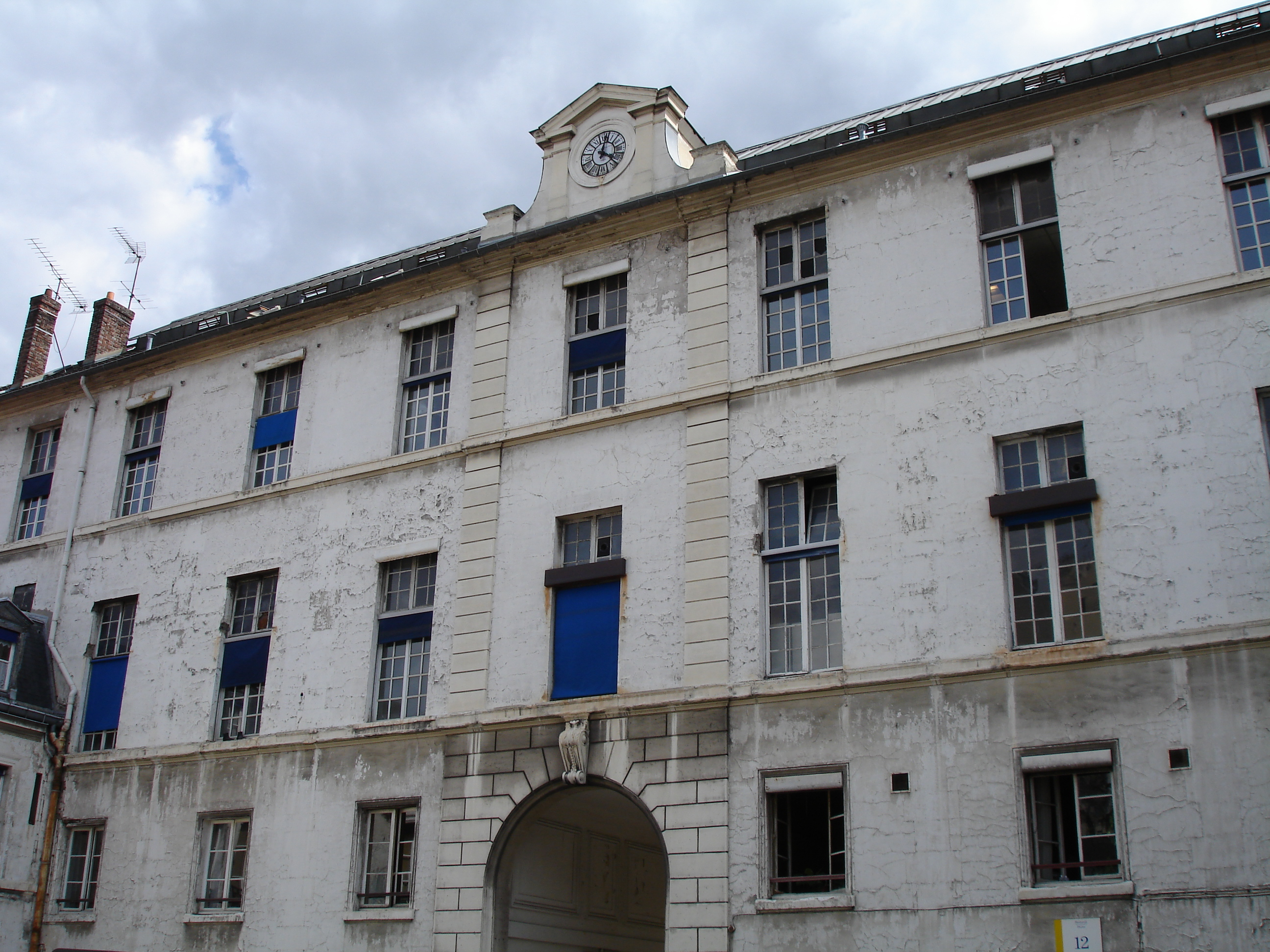
Entrance of the historical Necker hospital ("Carré Necker").

== See also ==
- Great Ormond Street Hospital
