= Woldemar Kernig =

Baltic German neurologist (1840–1917)

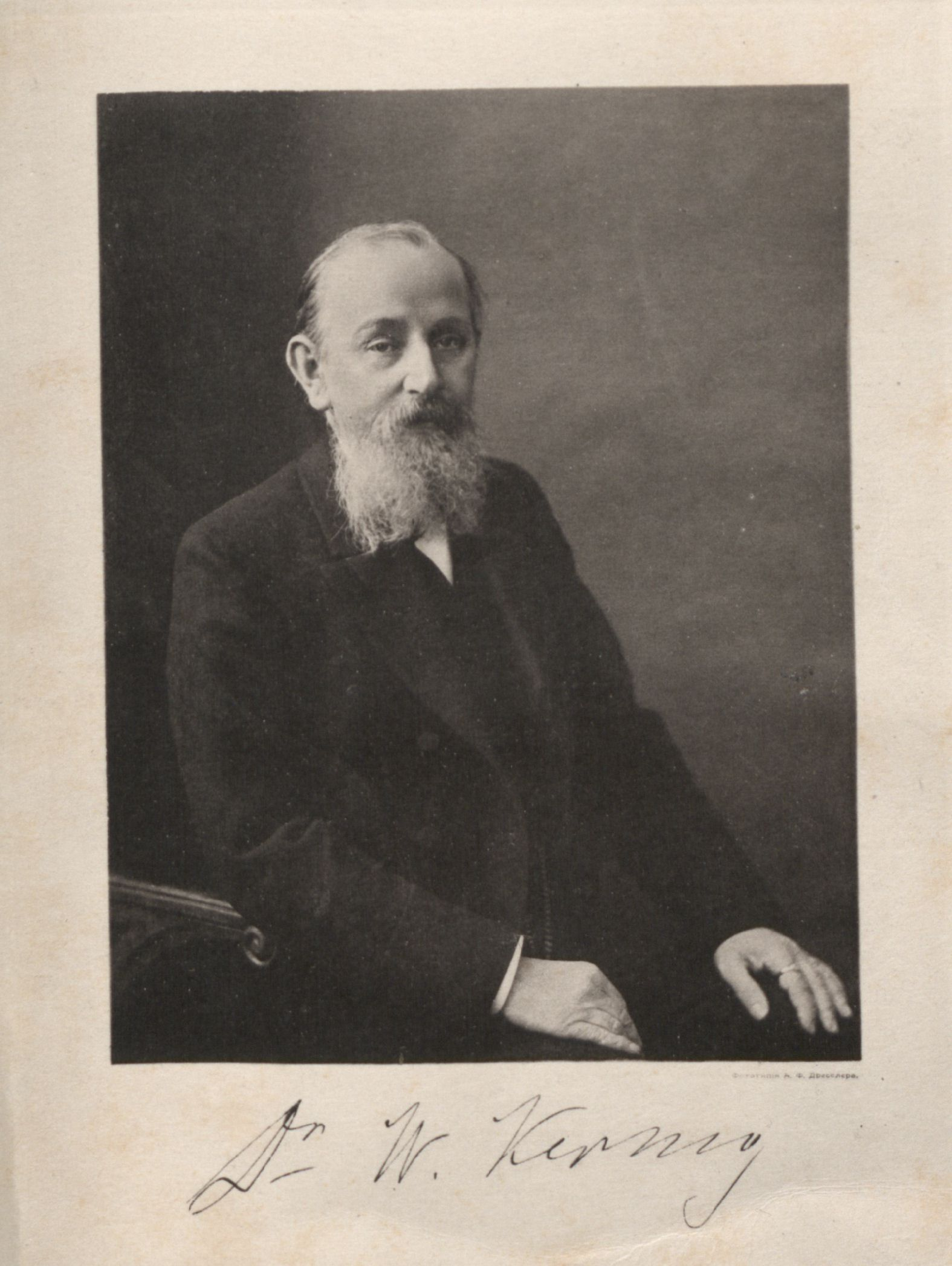
- Born: 28 June [O.S. 16 June] 1840; St. Petersburg, Russia
- Died: 18 April 1917 (aged 76); St. Petersburg, Russia
- Education: University of Dorpat
- Known for: Kernig's sign, which may indicate subarachnoid haemorrhage or meningitis
- Scientific career
- Fields: internal medicine, neurology
- Workplaces: Obuchow Hospital in St. Petersburg

Woldemar Kernig, better known as Vladimir Mikhailovich Kernig (Russian: Владимир Михайлович Керниг; Latvian: Voldemārs Kernigs; 28 June 1840 – 18 April 1917), was a Russian internist and neurologist of Baltic German descent whose medical discoveries saved thousands of people with meningitis. He is best known for his pioneering work on diagnostics. Kernig's sign is named after him.

== Biography ==
Woldemar Kernig was born in St. Petersburg in 1840 to a bookbinder of German origin, Benjamin Mikhail Kernig (1788–1862) and his spouse Wilhelmina Elizaveta (née Person). He received his early education at St. Peter's School from 1852 to 1856. In 1864, he graduated from Universität Dorpat with the degree of Doctor of Medicine for his dissertation about variations in body temperature in sick and healthy people (German: Experimentelle Beiträge zer Kenntniss der Wärmeregulirung beim Menschen). In the same year, he began to work at Obukhovskaya Hospital in St. Petersburg, becoming a physician-resident in 1865.

From 1873 to 1890, he was a doctor at a school for deaf-mutes, and from 1881 to 1886 he taught internal medicine in medical courses for women. From 1884 he was a consultant in internal medicine for the Office of the Institutions of Empress Maria (Russian: Ведомство учреждений императрицы Марии, romanized: Vedomstvo uchrezhdeniy imperatritsy Marii). He was chairperson of the Society of German Physicians in St. Petersburg.

From 1890 to 1911, he was chief physician at Obukhovskaya Hospital. In 1911, he entered retirement with the title "Respected Consultant of the Hospital".

He died in Petrograd on 19 April 1917. He was buried in the Smolensky Lutheran Cemetery.

== Kernig's sign ==
In Kernig's original 1882 publication, he wrote that in patients with meningitis who are seated upright with hips and knees flexed, extending the knee beyond 135 degrees would be painful. Today patients are put into a supine position instead of being seated upright.

== Other achievements ==
In 1904, Kernig described acute pericarditis after severe attacks of angina pectoris and gave an explanation of its pathogenesis, forming part of the foundational research on myocardial infarction. He was one of the principal organizers of higher women's medical education in Russia and provided initiative for the establishment of the Medical Institute for Women (Russian: Женский медицинский институт, romanized: Zhenskiy meditsinskiy institut).

== See also ==
- List of Baltic German scientists

== Sources ==
- Koehler, P. J. (29 April 2014). "Kernig, Vladimir". Encyclopedia of the Neurological Sciences. Academic Press. p. 806. ISBN 978-0-12-385158-1.

== Publications ==
- Über Milzabscesse nach Febris recurrens. St. Petersburger medicinische Zeitschrift, 1867, XII.
- Über subfebrile Zustände von erheblicher Dauer. Deutsches Archiv für klinische Medicin, Leipzig, 1879, XXIV.
- Über ein krankheitssymptom der acuten meningitis. St. Petersburger Medizinische Woschenschrift, 1882;7:398
- Vorläufiger Bericht über die in der Frauenabteilung des Obuchow-Hospitals nach Koch’scher Methode behandelten Schwindsüchtigen. Deutsches Archiv für klinische Medicin, Leipzig, 1891, XVI.
- Über subcutane Injectionen an den Lungenspitzen ohne pathologische Veränderungen an denselben. Deutsches Archiv für klinische Medicin, Leipzig, 1898; XXXIV.
- Bericht über die mit Tuberculin R im Obuchow-Frauenhospital behandelten Lungenkranken. St. Petersburger medicinische Wochenschrift, 1898; XXIII.
- Russian: О перикадите и других объективных изменениях в сердце после приступов грудной жабы, romanized: O perikardite i drugikh ob'ektivnykh izmeneniyakh v serdtse posle pristupov grudnoy zhaby (Russian: «Русский врач», romanized: Russkiy vrach, 1904, № 44)
