= Victor Henri Hutinel =

French physician (1849–1933)

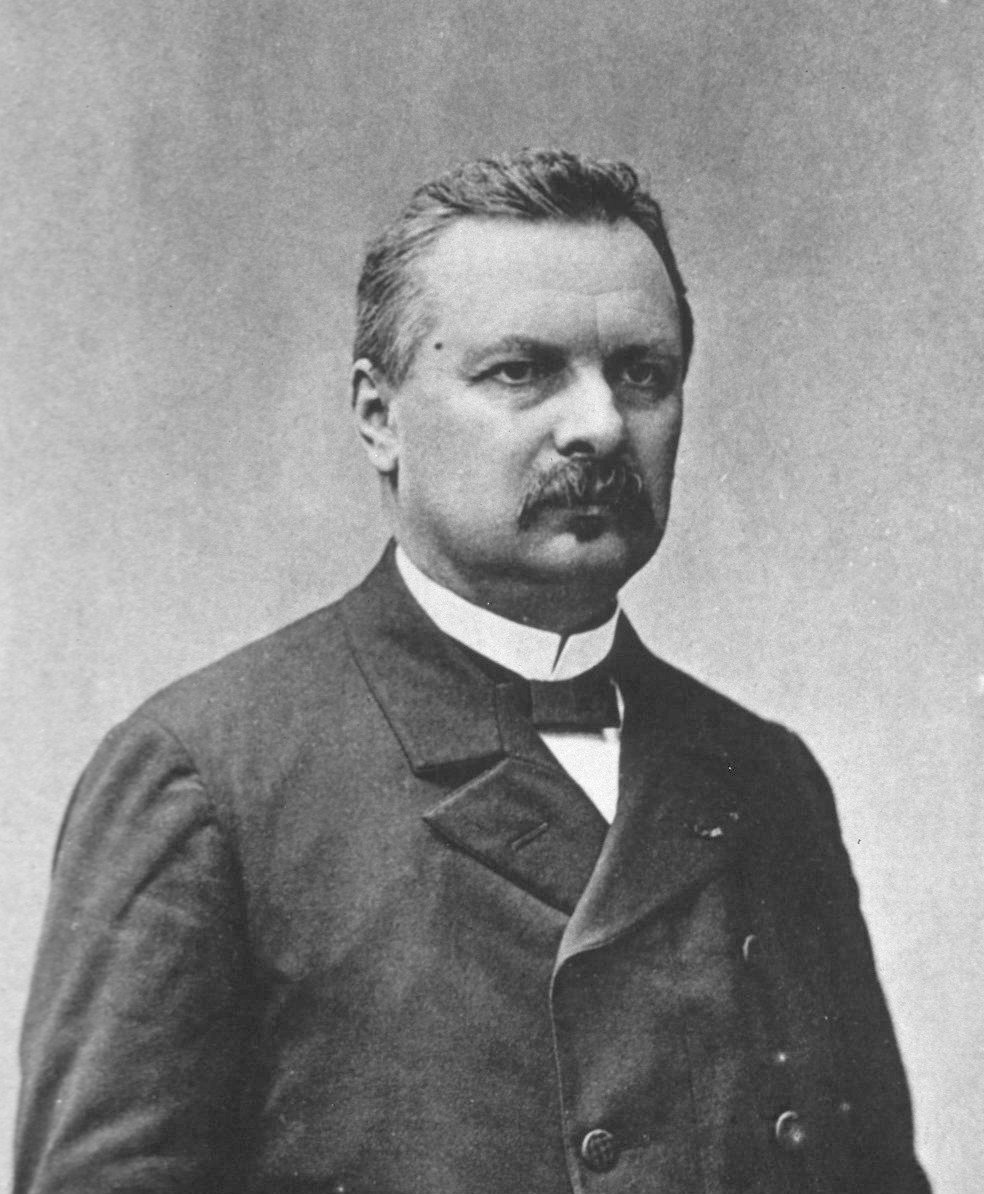
Victor Henri Hutinel

Victor Henri Hutinel (French pronunciation: [viktɔʁ ɑ̃ʁi ytinɛl]; 15 April 1849 – 21 March 1933) was a French physician who was a native of Châtillon-sur-Seine, Côte-d'Or. He specialized in pediatric medicine and childhood diseases.

He studied medicine in Nancy, and later Paris, where he became an externe in 1871. He earned his medical doctorate in 1877, and in 1879 became médecin des hôpitaux. In 1897 he was professor of internal pathology, and in 1907 became a professor of pediatrics, succeeding Jacques-Joseph Grancher (1843–1907) as director at the Hôpital des Enfants-Malades in Paris.

Among his written publications was a five-volume work on childhood diseases called Les maladies des enfants. Another name for cirrhosis of the liver associated with childhood tuberculous pericarditis is sometimes referred to as "Hutinel's cirrhosis".
