= Kernig's sign =

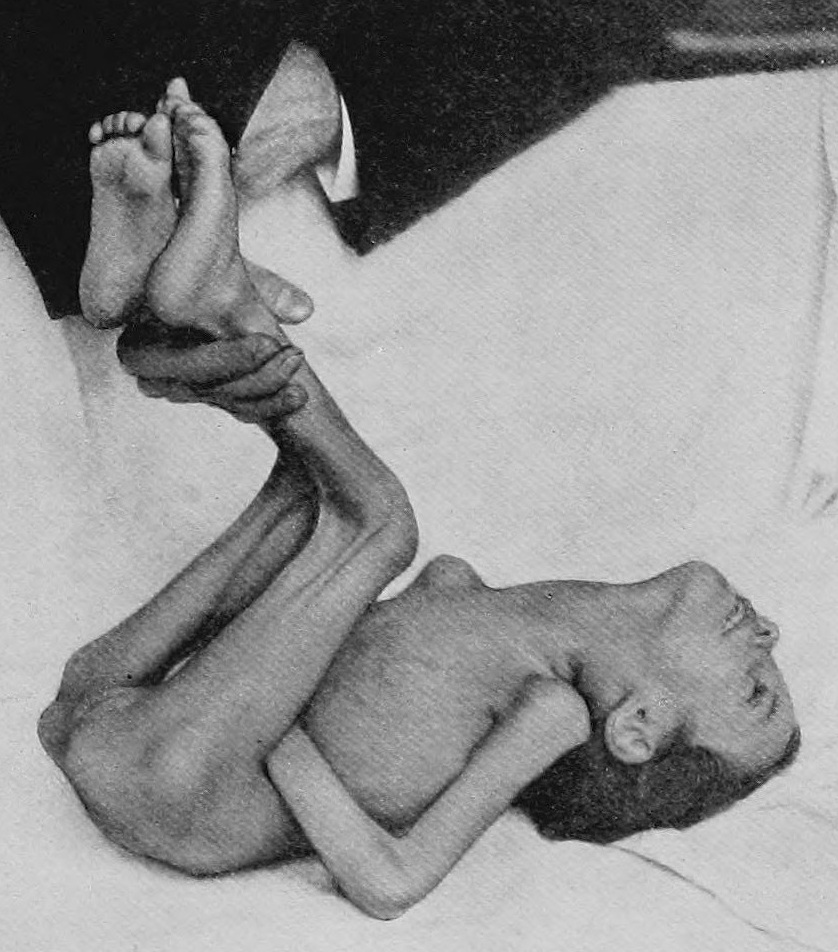
- Positive Kernig's sign in meningitis
- Differential diagnosis: subarachnoid hemorrhage or meningitis

Kernig's sign is a test used in physical examination to look for evidence of irritation of the meninges or meningitis. The test involves flexing the thighs at the hip, and the knees, at 90 degree angles, and assessing whether subsequent extension of the knee is painful (leading to resistance), in which case it is deemed positive. This may indicate subarachnoid haemorrhage or meningitis. Patients may also show opisthotonus—spasm of the whole body that leads to legs and head being bent back and body bowed forward.

A review of available literature failed to show empirically tested, peer reviewed evidence for the tests efficacy; also noting its low sensitivity of 5%, meaning that lack of the sign is not diagnostically dispositive, though specificity is 95%, meaning the presence of the sign is almost certainly diagnostic. Kernig's should not be relied on when meningitis is suspected and a lumbar puncture should be performed.

== Name ==
The test is named after Woldemar Kernig (1840–1917), a Russian neurologist.

== See also ==
- Brudziński's sign
