= Tower (Keith Haring) =

Mural by Keith Haring in Paris, France

- Artist: Keith Haring
- Year: 1987
- Movement: Pop Art
- Dimensions: 2700 cm × 1300 cm (1,100 in × 510 in)
- Condition: Restored
- Location: Paris, France
- 48°50′43″N 2°18′56″E
- Owner: Necker-Enfants Malades Hospital

Tower (French: Tour) is a mural by American artist Keith Haring executed in 1987. The mural covers the exterior of a preserved stairwell from the now demolished building of the Necker-Enfants Malades Hospital in Paris, France. It is one of two public murals in France by the artist.

== Description ==
The 88.5 foot-tall mural is composed of black line figures overlaid on bright-colored shapes. William Shank, former chief conservator of the San Francisco Museum of Modern Art, described the mural:

His freehand design depicts a large pregnant woman, his signature crawling ‘radiant babies,’ and a handful of bouncing figures of adults interacting with children. All of the figures were applied in thick black lines, at close-range and without preliminary sketches, over free-form shapes of bright yellows, greens, blues and reds.

== Historical Information ==
=== Conception ===
Haring painted the mural while in Paris for the 10th anniversary exhibition of American artists at the Centre Pompidou. It covers the surface of what was once an exterior stairwell of the Necker-Enfants Malades Hospital. Haring had described the Necker hospital as the "ugly building" and wrote in his journal in 1987 that: “I made this painting to amuse the sick children in this hospital, now and in the future”.

It was painted with the assistance of Haring's then boyfriend and member of the House of Xtravaganza Juan Rivera. They completed the mural over the course of three days without the use of preparatory sketches, using a crane to suspend themselves from the top of the structure.

=== Restoration ===
Planning for a restoration of the mural began in 2011 as the stairwell and paint surface had become so derelict as to be condemned by the hospital's officials. Conservator William Shank described how: "iron armature was poking through the painted surface alarmingly in many key places, disrupting the visual harmony of the mural," and that "the black lines themselves had suffered from extreme seasonal changes in temperature, lifting and peeling away from the tower over about eighty percent of the surface".

Gallerist Jérôme de Noirmont led restoration efforts in collaboration with the Keith Haring Foundation. Funding was primarily provided by the Daniel and Nina Carasso Foundation and through a charity auction organized by Sotheby's. Restoration was undertaken by conservators Antonio Rava and William Shank, who had also restored Haring's 1989 mural Tuttomondo in Pisa, Italy.

By the time the Tower was fully restored in September 2017, the 1950s surgery center the stairwell had once attached to had been demolished and a new hospital building had been constructed. The mural now stands as a "totem" and centerpiece of the hospital gardens.
