= Brudziński's sign =

- Differential diagnosis: Meningitis, Meningism

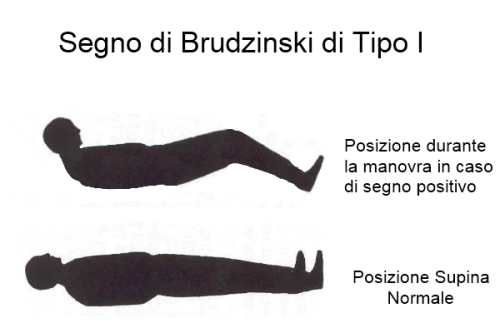
Illustration of "Brudzinski Sign Type I"

Brudziński's sign or a Brudziński sign is any of three medical signs, all of which may occur in meningitis or meningism. All three are named after Józef Brudziński. Like many borrowed words in English, the name is often written without the diacritic (Brudzinski) and is pronounced /bruːˈdʒɪnski/.

== Brudziński cheek sign ==
The Brudziński cheek sign or Brudziński's cheek phenomenon is a clinical sign in which pressure on the cheek elicits a reflex action, usually a twitching of the area near the eye or upper lip, and flexion of the forearm when pressure is applied to upper arm with a sphygmomanometer. It is found in patients with meningitis, and is analogous to the Brudziński symphyseal sign in the lower limb.

== Brudziński symphyseal sign ==
The Brudziński symphyseal sign is a clinical sign in which pressure on the pubic symphysis elicits a reflex flexion of the hip and knee, and abduction of the leg. It is found in patients with meningitis, and is analogous to the Brudziński cheek sign in the upper limb.

This sign was also independently discovered by a Brazilian clinician, Aloísio De Castro (1881-1959), in 1912, and is commonly called Aloísio De Castro's Sign in Brazil.

== Brudziński neck sign ==
The Brudziński neck sign or Brudziński's symptom is a clinical sign in which forced flexion of the neck elicits a reflex flexion of the hips. It is found in patients with meningitis, subarachnoid haemorrhage and possibly encephalitis. It is not very commonly seen.

=== Pathophysiology ===
The pain felt on Kernig's sign is due to meningeal irritation caused by movement of the spinal cord within the meninges. In the Brudzinski's neck sign, this movement with neck flexion is cancelled out by the flexion of the hip; much like two persons pulling on either side of a single rope.

== See also ==
- Meningism
- Kernig's sign
