= Semmelweis reflex =

Cognitive bias

The Semmelweis reflex or "Semmelweis effect" is the reflex-like tendency to reject new evidence or new knowledge because it contradicts established norms, beliefs, or paradigms.

== Origins and historical context ==
The term derives from the name of Ignaz Semmelweis, an Austrian-Hungarian physician who discovered in 1847 that childbed fever mortality rates fell ten-fold when doctors disinfected their hands with a chlorine solution before moving from one patient to another, or, most particularly, after an autopsy. (At one of the two maternity wards at the university hospital where Semmelweis worked, physicians performed autopsies on every deceased patient.) Semmelweis's procedure saved many lives by stopping the ongoing contamination of patients (mostly pregnant women) with what he termed "cadaverous particles", twenty years before germ theory was developed. Despite the overwhelming empirical evidence, his fellow doctors rejected his hand-washing suggestions, often for non-medical reasons. For instance, some doctors refused to believe that a gentleman's hands could transmit disease.

While there is uncertainty regarding its origin and generally accepted use, the expression "Semmelweis Reflex" was used by the author Robert Anton Wilson. In the book The Game of Life (with Timothy Leary), Wilson provided the following polemical definition of the Semmelweis reflex: "Mob behavior found among primates and larval hominids on undeveloped planets, in which a discovery of important scientific fact is punished".

In the preface to the fiftieth anniversary edition of his book The Myth of Mental Illness, Thomas Szasz says that Semmelweis's biography impressed upon him at a young age, a "deep sense of the invincible social power of false truths."

== Explanation ==
=== Semmelweis reflex as a cognitive bias ===
==== Confirmation bias ====
Confirmation bias is the tendency to favour information that is consistent with prior beliefs or values. When Semmelweis introduced the handwashing proposal, the existing beliefs on disease transmission that other doctors held at that time included miasma theory, which suggests diseases were spread through “bad air”. It was also a common belief that childbed fever happens due to factors like inherent weakness of the patients rather than unclean hands. The handwashing proposal contradicted existing beliefs, which may have led people to be biased against accepting the proposal, despite empirical evidence showing that handwashing significantly reduces maternal mortality rates from 18% to less than 3%.

==== Authority bias ====
Authority bias reveals people are more likely to be influenced by the opinions of authority figures. In the days before the medical professions made the connection between germs and disease, senior doctors, including Semmelweis’ professor Johann Klein, were scornful of Semmelweis' idea of preventing bacterial infections through antimicrobial strategies that are now widely accepted. The leading obstetrician, Charles Meigs, was firmly against Semmelweis’s doctrine because “doctors are gentlemen, and gentlemen’s hands are clean.” Throughout human history, obeying authority figures often give better a means of survival because they normally have greater access to resources at the top of the social hierarchy. As a result, although the authority figures can be wrong, the medical community tends to believe them rather than Ignaz Semmelweis, a professor assistant at that time.

=== Semmelweis reflex as belief perseverance ===
The Semmelweis reflex also exemplifies how belief perseverance causes individuals to adhere to their initial beliefs despite contradicting evidence. The human brain has fully developed the cerebral cortex and the prefrontal cortex (PFC), which equips individuals with the power to resist primitive instincts and adaptability but also maintains the status quo and avoids deliberate changes. Therefore, belief perseverance can be interpreted as a coping mechanism that reflects the human tendency to resist change and discomfort.

=== Semmelweis reflex as groupthink ===
The Semmelweis proposal was met with unanimous rejection and hostility from the medical community in the 19th century, exemplifying the phenomenon of groupthink, where consensus overrides consideration of alternatives. There may have been pressure to conform to the common beliefs, hindering individuals from accepting Semmelweis's innovative idea. In an open letter, Semmelweis slammed other doctors as “ignorant murderers”, which only served to further isolate him as an outlier from the group. Research on barriers to the transmission of new ideas highlights the challenge of adopting innovative concepts, especially when they are perceived as superior by external entities, as this could pose a threat to the collective pride of the group.

=== Semmelweis reflex as theory-induced blindness ===
In the book Thinking, Fast and Slow, Daniel Kahneman used the term “theory-induced blindness” to explain how a false theory survived for so long. When people accept a theory, System 1 internalised it as a tool for thinking, making it difficult to realise any potential flaws. Even after discovering that the theory doesn't explain the model well, system 1 automatically assumes that there must be a way to explain it but may not look deeper into what that explanation is. On the other hand, discarding an inherent theory is difficult because it requires the deliberate involvement of system 2.

== Modern examples ==
=== Freud's methodology ===
Sigmund Freud developed his theory of psychological (not somatic) illness in Vienna from the 1890s to the 1930s. Like Semmelweis, the Viennese college of physicians did not accept his theories and rejected them. Even after Freud had become internationally known and respected, he never became "o. Professor" in Vienna, but remained an hourly-paid Privatdozent, giving his one lecture on Saturdays 8 to 10 am. A tradition that is sometimes carried on by certain lecturers till today by scheduling the introduction to psychoanalytical methods in that unusual and unpopular time slot.

=== Albert Einstein's "Teutonic" critics ===
Albert Einstein's approach to relativity was heavily vilified by virtually all major German physicists, calling Einstein's work "Jewish physics," lasting from the 1900s to 1945. The singular exception was Max Planck, who championed Einstein's work and enabled its publication. Einstein had to work as a patent-office clerk not as a scientist while in Europe.

=== Robert Bárány Nobel Prize Laureate ===
Not unlike Einstein or Semmelweis was the 1915 Nobel Prize Laureate for Medicine/Physiology, the Austro-Hungarian HNO-Doctor mobbed by the University of Vienna professoriate. Bárány was accused after winning the Nobel Prize, accused by one of his pre-war employers, Gustav Alexander, to have failed to cite and thus plagiarized Alexander's work. Meanwhile, Bárány failed to secure employment in his field in Vienna, which led him to move to Uppsala, where he was appointed professor. Bárány made several attempts to clear his name, including self-reporting his alleged transgression to the University of Vienna disciplinary committee, yet he was not allowed to see Alexander's case against him nor to speak before the committee. The University of Vienna ended the investigation in 1922 favourably for Gustav Alexander and has since not cleared Bárány's name.

=== Jane Goodall's research methodology ===
Famous primate researcher Jane Goodall was for many years in the beginning of her career subject to heavy and vitriolic criticisms by colleagues in the field. One case in point that the established researchers at the time abhorred was that she gave her primates personal names rather than identification numbers.

=== Airborne transmission of Covid-19 ===
The delayed recognition of COVID-19's airborne transmission has been seen as a modern example of the Semmelweis reflex. Despite some evidence indicating aerosol spread, the focus of WHO was primarily on droplet transmission because almost all infectious diseases are spread through droplets. It wasn’t until December 2021 that the WHO officially recognised airborne transmission, which shows the challenge of shifting entrenched beliefs, especially when the prevailing understanding aligns with established norms. Integrating innovative perspectives swiftly in existing frameworks poses a significant challenge. As the epidemiologist Christopher Dye says, “What the WHO says is normally based on a consensus of expert advice and opinion.”

=== Suzanne Simard's critics ===
Suzanne Simard's unconventional and highly innovative ways of researching tree underground communication networks ("mother trees") has likewise triggered Semmelweis-reflex as a kind of belittling that was has been referred to as a "forceful scientific backlash"

== Interventions ==
To mitigate the Semmelweis reflex, one needs to critically evaluate beliefs that are taken for granted, which requires the deliberate engagement of system 2 thinking. Research examining dual-process interventions in diagnostic reasoning shows cognitive forcing tools and guided reflection can enhance diagnostic accuracy. These interventions encourage individuals to actively consider alternative diagnoses that may not be intuitive, thereby enabling them to consciously confront potential biases. However, conflicting findings from other studies suggest that these strategies might not consistently yield the desired results, particularly among students and young doctors.

== Critiques and future research ==
Most research on the Semmelweis reflex primarily focuses on its historical origins and implications in medical and healthcare settings, particularly in diagnosis. However, the reluctance to embrace new ideas is not limited to medical professionals; it can also hinder progress and innovation within all walks of life. Research on the effects of Semmelweis reflex in different fields is therefore needed to develop more applicable interventions.

== See also ==
- Belief perseverance
- Cognitive dissonance
- Confirmation bias
- Conservatism (belief revision)
- Galileo gambit
- Luddite
- Not invented here
- Paradigm shift
