= Hospitalism (public health) =

German mathematician

Hospitalism was the name of public health crisis that developed in early 1860's and that was formalised in an article by Scottish obstetrician James Young Simpson, professor of medicine and midwifery at Edinburgh University in 1869, that described how large hospitals, due to their size, location, overcrowding and poor ventilation were causing excessive deaths of patients who had contracted septic diseases like pyaemia, gangrene, erysipelas and pyaemia.
