= Mayrhofer =

Mayrhofer is a German surname meaning "from the region of Mayrhof" in Austria. Notable people with the surname include:

- Carl Mayrhofer (1837–82), Austrian obstetrician
- Johann Mayrhofer (1787–1836), Austrian poet and librettist known for his friendship with Franz Schubert
- Manfred Mayrhofer (1926–2011), Austrian linguist who specialized in Indo-Iranian languages
- Wolfgang Mayrhofer (born 1958), Austrian sailor who competed in the 1980 Olympics, academic in the field of management and organisational behaviour
- Gregor Mayrhofer (born 1987), German conductor, pianist and composer

== Other uses ==
- 1690 Mayrhofer, an asteroid named after Austrian amateur astronomer Karl Mayrhofer (1903–82)
