= Ede Flórián Birly =

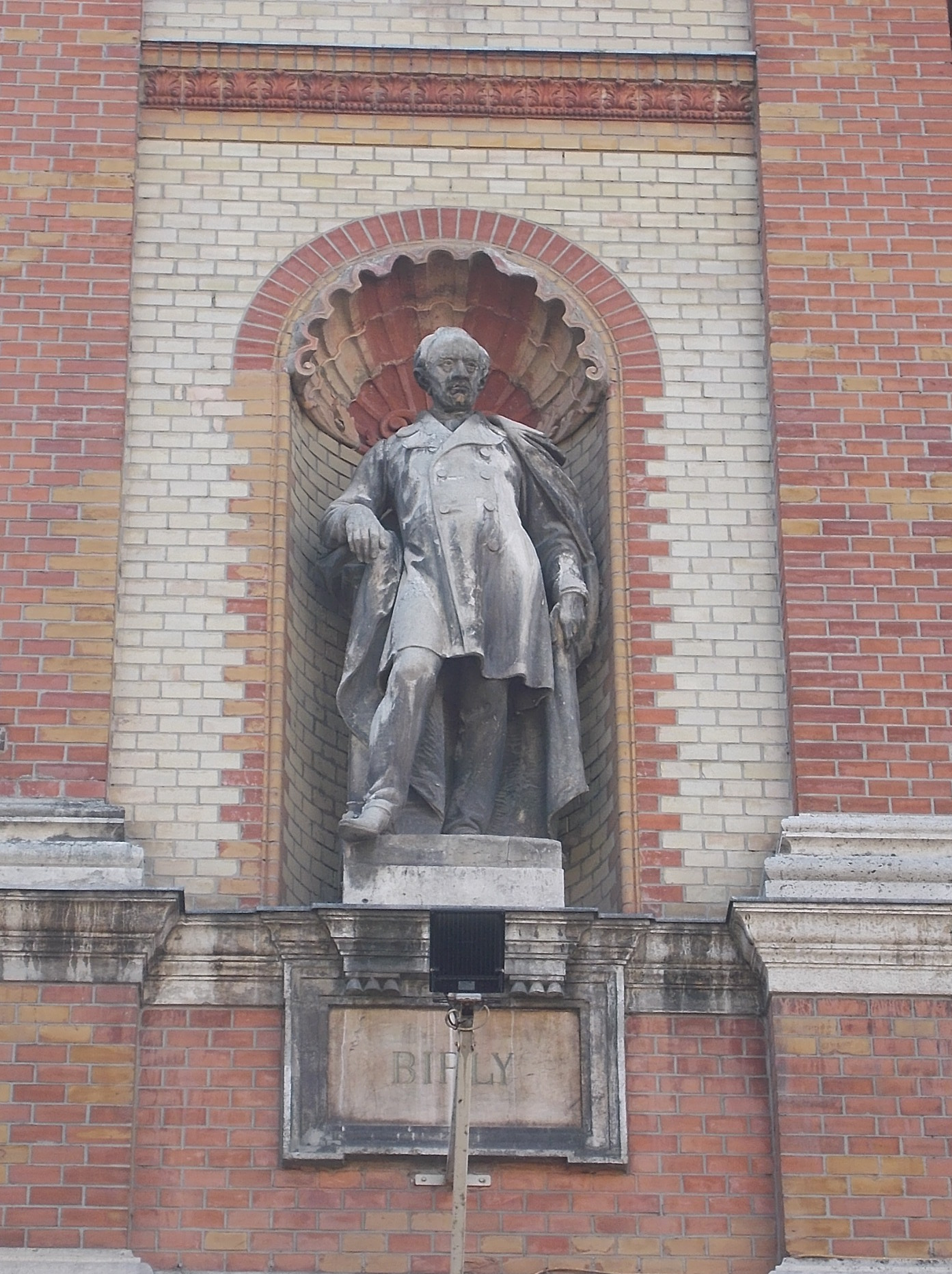
Statue of Birly, Obstetrics and Gynecology Clinic, Semmelweis University

Ede Flórián Birly (1787–1854) was Professor of Theoretical and Practical Obstetrics at the University of Pest. He was one of Semmelweis's principal opponents.
