= Semmelweis Museum of Medical History =

Semmelweis Museum, Library and Archive of the History of Medicine
- Semmelweis Orvostörténeti Múzeum, Könyvtár és Levéltár
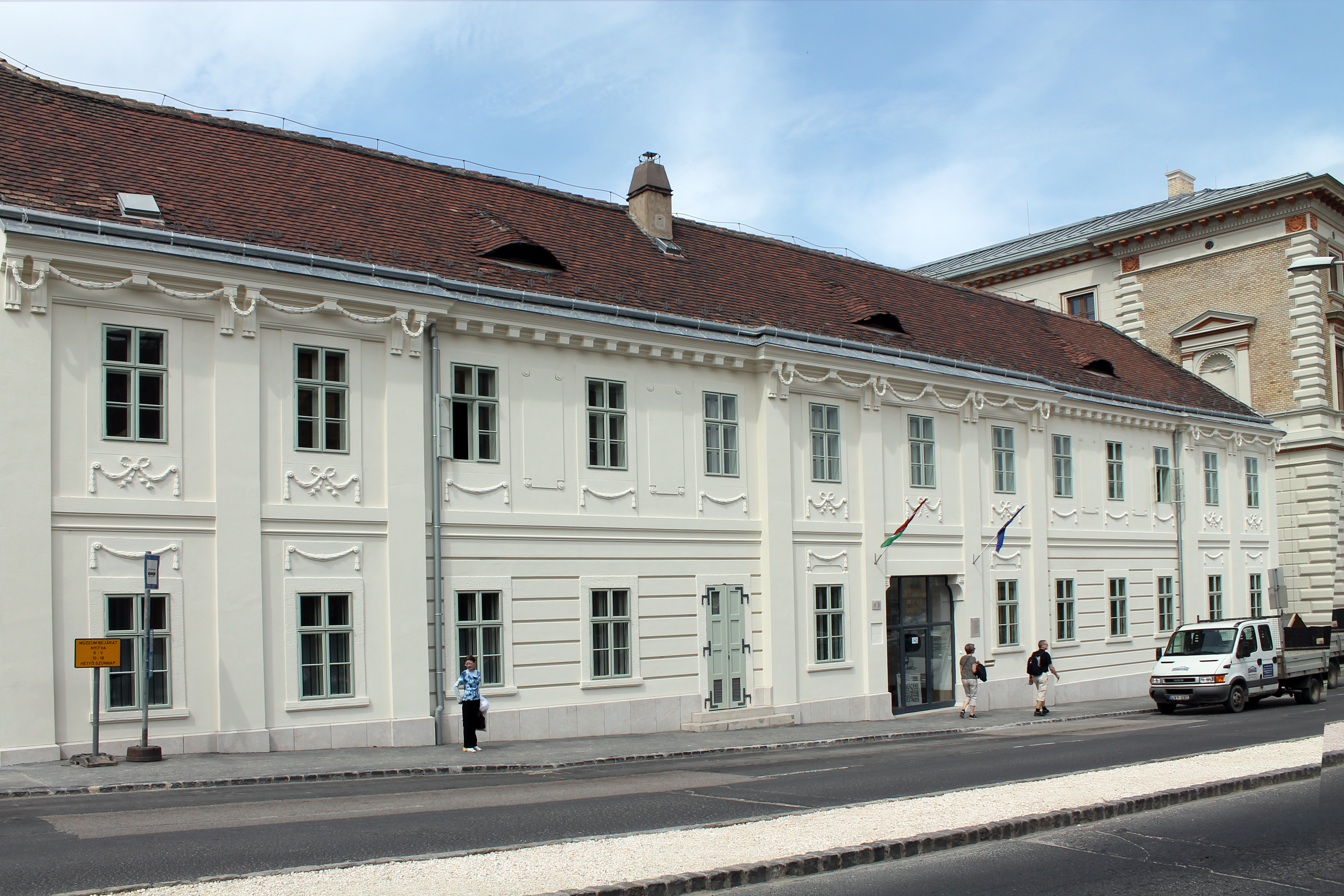
- Semmelweis Museum in Meindl House
- Established: 1965
- Location: 1-3 Apród utca, Tabán, Várkerület district, Budapest, Hungary
- Coordinates: 47.493352°N 19.043211°E
- Type: museum of the history of medicine
- Founder: Hungarian Ministry of Health
- Director: Benedek Varga
- Owner: Government of Hungary
- Website: semmelweismuseum.hu

The Semmelweis Museum, Library and Archive of the History of Medicine (Hungarian: Semmelweis Orvostörténeti Múzeum, Könyvtár és Levéltár) is a museum, library and archive in Budapest, Hungary. It was founded in 1965, and became a department of the Hungarian National Museum in 2017. The museum is located in the 18th-century house where Ignaz Semmelweis was born in 1818. The exhibition covers the development of healthcare in Hungary and the main stages in the history of medicine in Europe.

== Meindl House ==
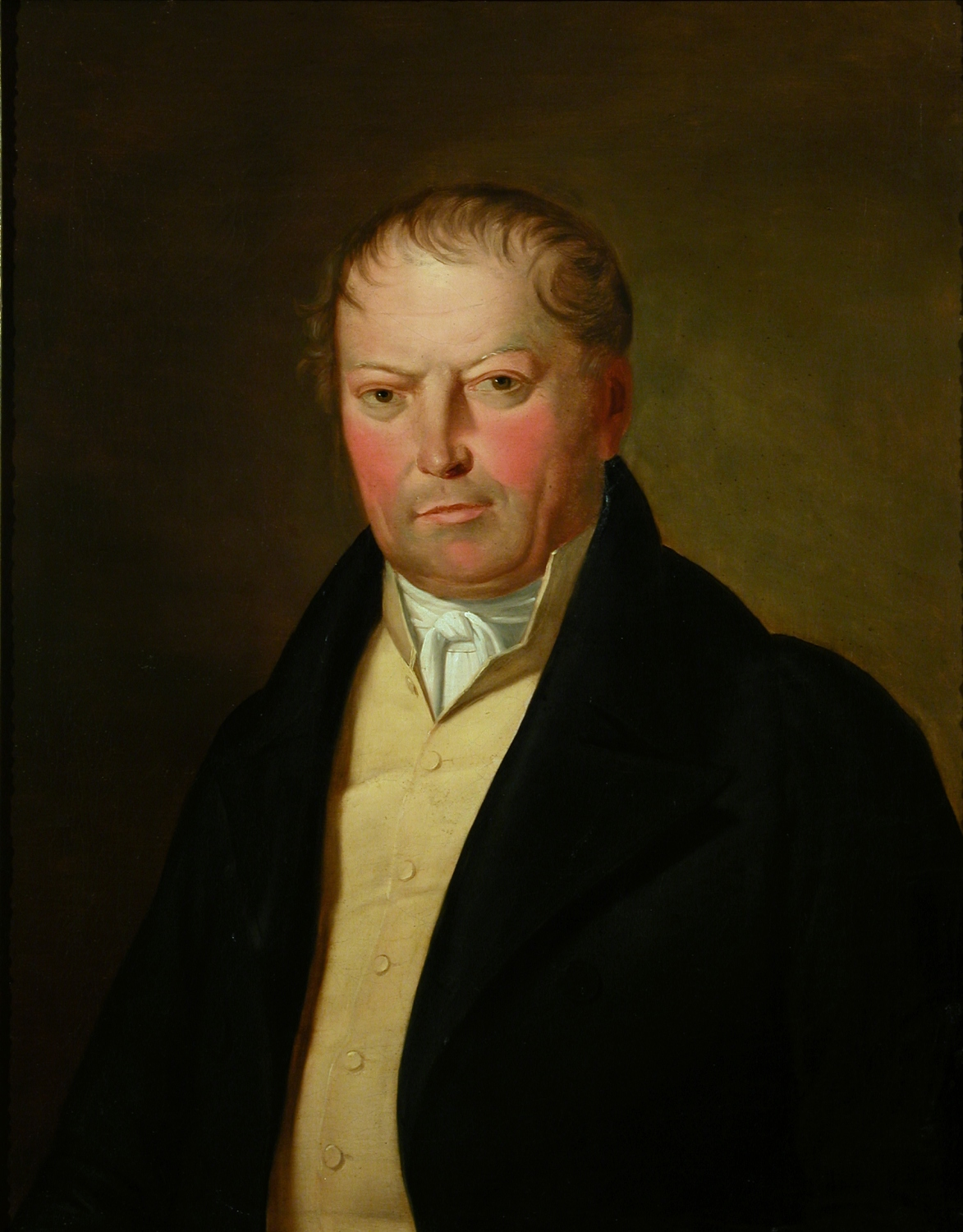
Joseph Semmelweis, grocer and the father of Ignaz Semmelweis.

Meindl House is an 18th-century building at the foot of Várhegy (Castle Hill) in the Tabán neighbourhood, near the Danube river (the present address is no. 1-3 Apród utca). The house is a listed national monument due to its architectural significance and being the birthplace of Ignaz Semmelweis, an early pioneer of antiseptic procedures. Described as the "saviour of mothers", Semmelweis discovered that the incidence of childbed fever could be drastically reduced by requiring hand disinfection in obstetrical clinics.

Ignaz Semmelweis was born in the house on 1 July 1818; he was the fifth child of Joseph Semmelweis and Theresia Müller. The Semmelweis family were ethnic Germans, his father was born in Kismarton near the Austrian border, and his mother was the daughter of a coachbuilder from Buda. Joseph Semmelweis was granted citizenship in Buda in 1806 and, in the same year, he opened a wholesale business for spices and general consumer goods. The shop was named Zum weißen Elefanten (At the White Elephant), and it was located on the ground floor of Meindl House (to the right of the entrance). Joseph Semmelweis lived in a flat on the first floor with his growing family. There was a cafe on the ground floor (on the left side) that belonged to the owner of the house, Johann Meindl. In 1823 Joseph Semmelweis relocated his grocery shop to the other side of the street into a house that he bought a year before. The Semmelweis family also moved into this house before 1830; Ignaz Semmelweis left Buda in 1837 when he went to study at the university in Vienna.

Meindl House was constructed around 1790 but it was rebuilt in Late Baroque (Zopf) style after the Great Tabán Fire of 1810. At the time its location near the Pest-Buda Floating Bridge was prominent. The bridge connected the two cities, and the square on the Buda side was an important crossroads from where streets led to the north, south and up to Buda Castle. The latter was called Várfeljárat (Festungsauffahrt, now Apród utca), and the house was built facing this road on the corner of a flight of steep steps (now called Sándor Móric lépcső). After the Chain Bridge was opened in 1849 the area lost its role as a trade and traffic hub.

Architecturally the most interesting feature of the facade is the cornice, onetime regarded as the most beautiful in Buda; it has a twin corbels and exquisite hanging stucco garlands. Due to the steep slope of Castle Hill, the narrow rear wing of the house was built upon a stone retaining wall with four cellars dug into the ground. There were hanging corridors on three sides of the courtyard on the upper floor while the northern wing had a spacious terrace. Behind the main house there was an upper courtyard with smaller ancillary structures that were demolished in the late 1890s when the headquarters of the Directorate of Royal Gardens was built on the subdivided plot (the large building was destroyed in the war).

The house remained in possession of Johann Meindl until 1844. Later its owners were Lőrinc Jankovits (between 1844 and 1852) and Leo Schallinger (from 1852). Schallinger's heirs sold the house in 1885 to a wealthy grocer, Márton Wolf who remained its owner until his death during the final years of World War I. There were shops and pubs on the ground floor, among them the most famous clockmaker's shop in Budapest which was established by Victor Hoser and carried on by his son. The shop operated here from 1880 until 1935 when it relocated to nearby Attila körút. Another longstanding business was Mór Fried's shoemaker's shop. Herculanum mulató was a popular café chantant (zengeráj, Sängerei) in the 1880s, frequented by Crown Prince Rudolf and his friends according to local legends, and it had a beer garden in the interior courtyard.

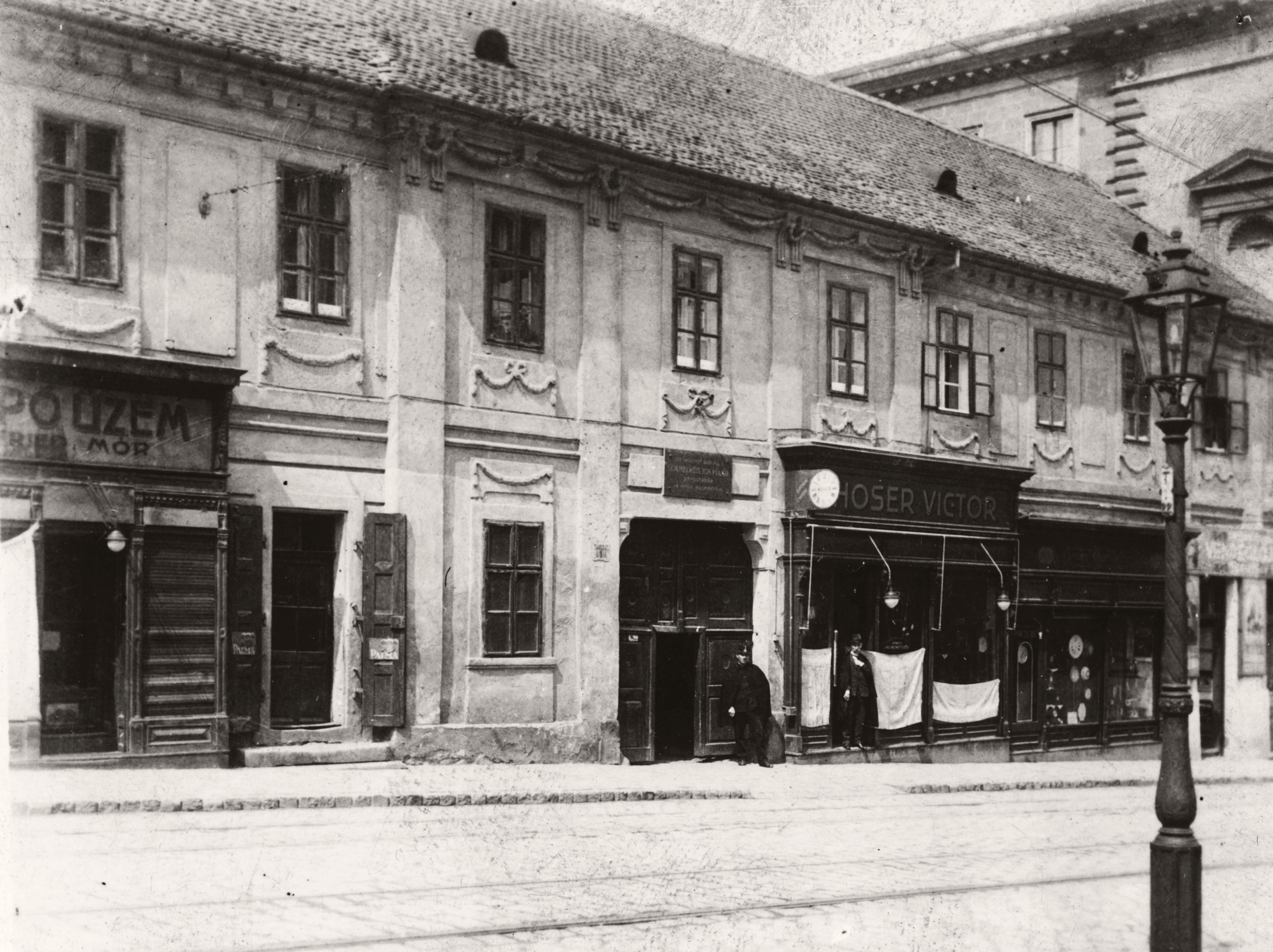
The birthplace of Ignaz Semmelweis in 1906.

In 1906 commemorations were held in Budapest to celebrate the achievements of Ignaz Semmelweis. The events were organised by the Budapesti Királyi Orvosegyesület (Budapest Royal Society of Physicians), and a red granite plaque was unveiled at his boyhood home in Apród utca.

Around 1918 the house was bought by Gyula Kalmár, the owner of a liquor factory, who wanted to demolish it in 1936 but his application for a six-storey apartment building was denied by the municipality. Two years later the municipality bought the house for 152'000 pengő with the intention to raze it as part of the ongoing urban renewal project of the Tabán area.

By that time the old house has fallen into a state of disrepair, and its occupants were extremely poor. The building was vacated in 1939 but two years later it was inhabited again by destitute families who lived there in unhealthy conditions. The fate of the house remained uncertain for years because some argued that it should be restored due to its historical connection with Semmelweis while others claimed that it has deteriorated beyond repair. Although remaining a crowded slum, it was finally listed as a protected monument in 1942 by ministerial decree. The municipality intended to create a museum and a kindergarten in the building after the war.

The surrounding area was almost completely destroyed in 1945 during the Siege of Budapest, and the ruins were cleared in the following years. Meindl House was an exception: although the northern and rear wings were lost (including the former flat of the Semmelweis family), the surviving part was hastily repaired after the war to make it habitable again. The plaque above the gate also survived the war but disappeared a few years later in unknown circumstances. Seven families lived in the remaining half of the house in 1959 without running water, also there was a car repair shop in the courtyard and a heap of overgrown rubble where the destroyed wing had stood.

== Medical history museum ==
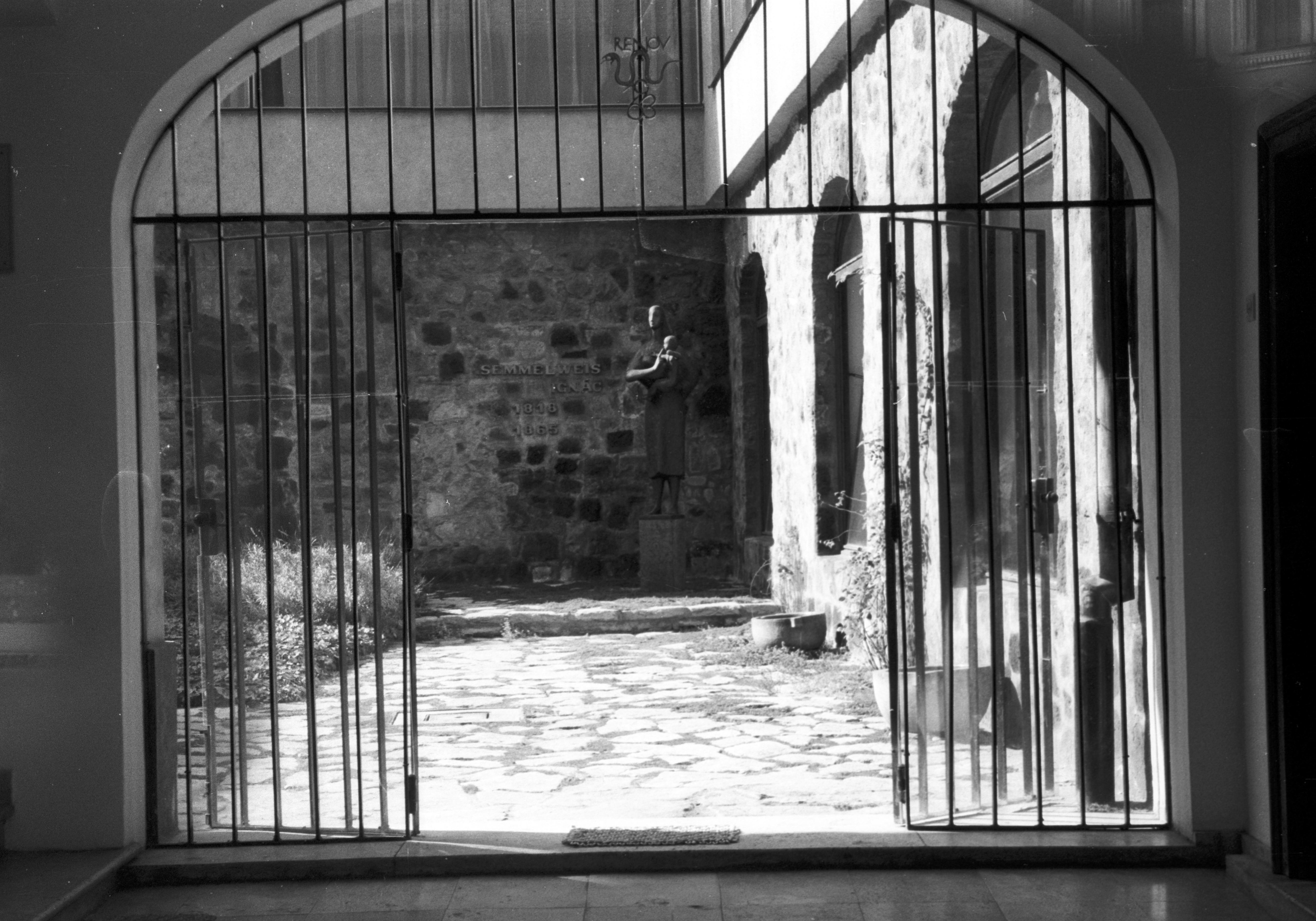
Courtyard of the museum with the tomb of Ignaz Semmelweis and the Motherhood statue in 1968.

The dilapidated building was still bearing the scars of the war in 1958 when the Ministry of Health decided the creation of a museum of medical history in the birthplace of Hungary's most famous doctor. The tenants were moved out in 1962, and the much delayed reconstruction of the house finally began. A number of artefacts and memorabilia in the Library of Medical History (Orvostörténeti Könyvtár) and the university became the nucleus of the collection but a nationwide campaign was started as well to gather more relevant objects. The museum was officially established on 13 August 1965, the 100th anniversary of Semmelweis' death.

Meindl House was reconstructed by the Budapesti Városépítési Tervező Vállalat (BVTV) according to the plans of Egon Pfannl. The exterior was carefully restored and the missing half of the building was rebuilt. The shopfronts and the doors on the ground floor were replaced by windows, and a metal framed glass door was installed to allow passers-by a glimpse into the vaulted gateway and the courtyard. The Late Baroque facade was painted red and white. The new north and west wings flanking the courtyard were built in mid-century modern style with rough-hewn stone walls on the ground floor and large ribbon windows on the upper story. The surviving parts of the house with the staircase, the hanging corridors around the courtyard and a few vaulted rooms were restored. The ground-floor spaces were converted to offices, library, council room and other auxiliary uses while the upper floor housed the exhibition with the Ignaz Semmelweis Memorial Room at the northwest corner, and the relocated interior of the Török Pharmacy in a neighbouring room. The modern exhibition spaces were designed by István Németh who worked on the new interiors of Buda Castle at the time.

The remains of Ignaz Semmelweis were moved from the Kerepesi Cemetery to the museum in 1963, and reinterred in a niche of the retaining wall on the western side of the courtyard. This tomb became the fifth burial place of the famous doctor. Motherhood, a bronze sculpture by Miklós Borsos was unveiled in front of it on 13 August 1965.

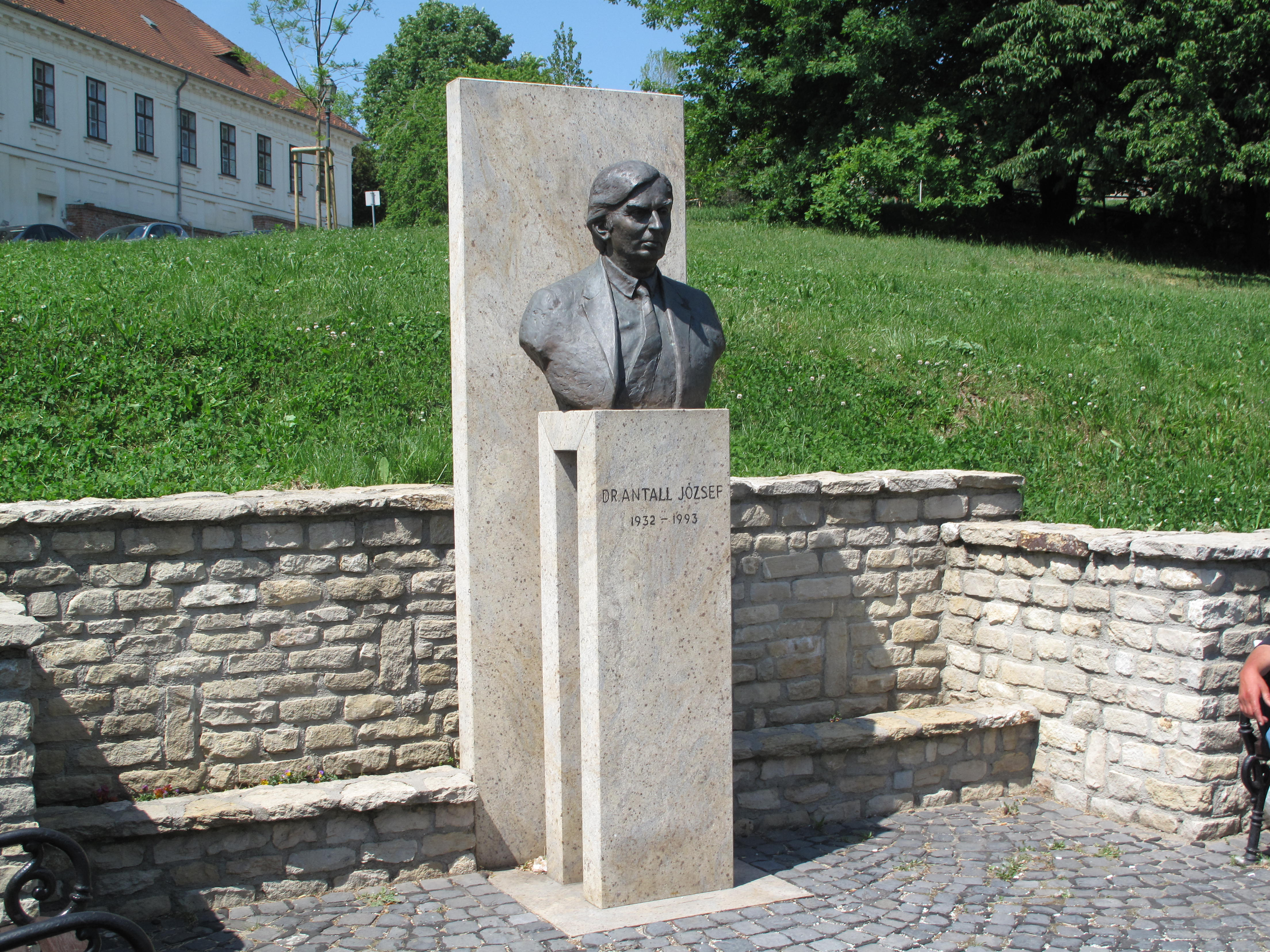
The bust of József Antall, director general of the museum and later Prime Minister of Hungary in Apród utca.

The first director of the museum was a distinguished gynecologist and medical historian, Sándor Fekete, the biographer of Ignaz Semmelweis. He was appointed in 1964, and served as director until his retirement in 1971. The next director was internist Emil Schultheisz (from 1972 to 1973) who was also deputy minister of health at the time. The Library of Medical History was merged into the museum in 1968, and the combined institution became a museum of national significance in 1972. The first permanent exhibition was opened in 1968 titled "Pictures from the History of Medicine" (Képek a gyógyítás múltjából). The rearranged and expanded exhibition was reopened on 21 May 1974 by Emil Schultheisz who was Minister of Health at the time. An independent exhibition on pharmaceutical history was created in 1974 in the old Arany Sas Pharmacy in Buda Castle. The permanent exhibition of the museum remained unchanged for a long time, and its basic arrangement is still the same (as of 2022).

The Semmelweis Museum of Medical History played an important part in the career of József Antall, the first democratically elected Prime Minister of Hungary after the end of communism. As a historian he wrote biographies of 80 doctors for the Lexicon of Hungarian Biographies in 1963, and became interested in the history of medicine. He started working in the museum next year as a research fellow, and was promoted to deputy director in 1967. He was appointed acting director general in 1974, and remained in this position until May 1990 when he became prime minister after the first free elections. As a medical historian Antall was recognised internationally, and under his leadership the museum has built relationships with scientific institutions in Western Europe and the US. The methodology of medical history research was developed by Antall and his colleagues in these decades as it was still a relatively new field of study at the time in Hungary. Antall also supervised the establishment of museum pharmacies in other cities (Sopron, Győr, Pécs, Székesfehérvár, Kőszeg, Kecskemét, Eger), and the preservation of protected furnitures of some 60 pharmacies. He organized the International Medical Historical Congress in 1974 in Budapest and the International Pharmaceutical-Historical Congress in 1981. The museum was a place of refuge for Antall during the years of communist dictatorship after his participation in the Hungarian Revolution of 1956, and his subsequent banishment from teaching due to his anticommunist views. It was still his workplace during the last years of the Kádár regime when he became politically active again in the opposition movements, and during the transition period to democracy.

The museum created a series of innovative temporary exhibitions and redefined itself beginning from the late 2000s; it won the Museum of the Year Award in 2010. Director general Benedek Varga was appointed to director general of the Hungarian National Museum in 2016, and the two institutions were merged. The facade of Meindl House was restored and repainted to its original cream colour in 2014.

== Governance ==
Director:

- 1964–1971: Sándor Fekete

Director Generals:

- 1972–1973: Emil Schultheisz
- 1974–1990: József Antall
- 1990–1998: Mária Vida
- 2000–2008: Károly Kapronczay
- 2008–2016: Benedek Varga

Director:

- 2021–: Benedek Varga

== Semmelweis Memorial Room ==
The first floor flat, where the Semmelweis family had lived, was totally destroyed when the house was hit by a bomb in 1945. Nothing is known about its original arrangement or furniture. A memorial room was established in the corner room on the first floor with the aim of recreating the atmosphere of Semmelweis' home in Pest in the 1860s. In 1964 the museum bought a few pieces of Biedermeier furniture (writing desk, bookcases, coffee table) and a 19th-century Shiraz rug from Ignác Semmelweis' grandson, obstetrician Kálmán Semmelweis-Lehocky. The pieces were inherited from Ignác Semmelweis according to the family tradition. The late 19th-century white ceramic stove was bought on the art market. The bookcases contain the remnants of Semmelweis' personal library with books of classical authors and contemporary journals of obstetrics. The memorial room was rearranged in 2020, and a new exhibition was added.

Two oval portrait medallions by August Canzi showing Ignaz Semmelweis and his wife, Mária Weidenhofer on their betrothal in 1857 were also bought from the doctor's grandson. The watercolour remains the only authentic painting from Semmelweis' adult life, created by a well-known contemporary artist working in Pest-Buda. Another portrait was painted about 1830 by Lénárt Landau, a painter in Pest. This oil-painting shows him as a child holding a Latin grammar-book in his hands. It was exhibited at the Semmelweis celebrations in 1894, and has been loaned permanently to the museum by its owner, the Budapest Historical Museum. The oil portraits of his parents, Theresia Müller and Joseph Semmelweis, from an unknown contemporary painter, were also put on display in the memorial room. The portraits of his maternal grandparents, Philipp Müller and Theresia Anderlin are hung above a bookcase; they were painted by Johann Volnhoffer in 1795.
