= Semmelweis-Frauenklinik =

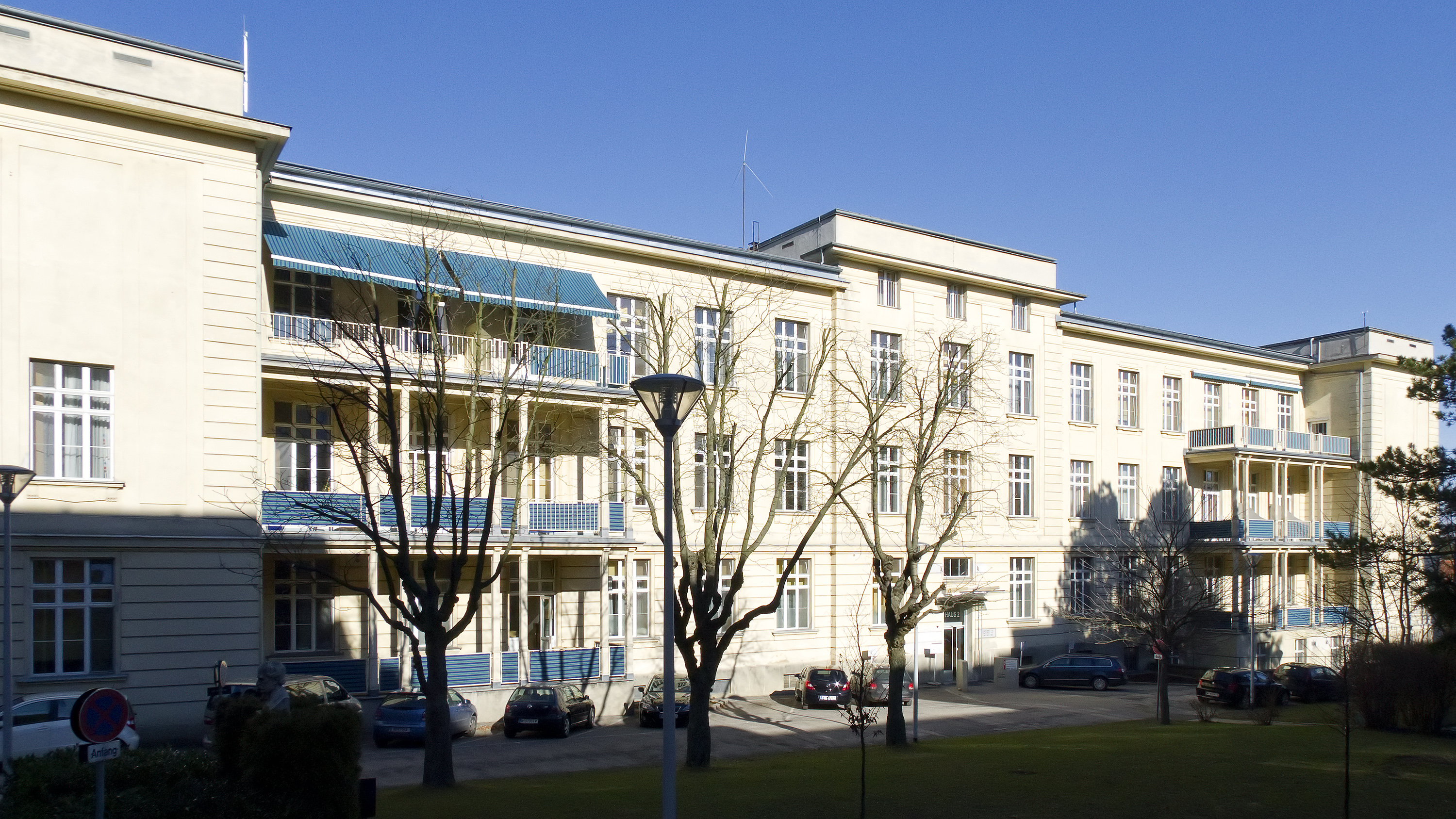

Geography
- Location: Währing, Vienna, Austria
- Coordinates: 48.2347°N 16.3194°E

Organisation
- Type: Specialist

Services
- Speciality: Women's clinic

History
- Constructed: 1908
- Opened: 1910

Links
- Lists: Hospitals in Austria

The Semmelweis-Frauenklinik (English: Semmelweis Women's Clinic) was a women's clinic in the 18th district of Vienna known as Währing. It is named after Ignaz Semmelweis. The clinic was registered as a historically significant place and used to be found at Bastiengasse 36–38 in Vienna. It encompasses six five-story pavilions surrounded by a park.

In the complex is a statue commemorating Kaiser Franz Joseph I of Austria, completed in 1910 by sculptor Georg Leisek. A bust of Ignaz Semmelweis by Rudolf Schmidt, commissioned in 1944, is also located on the grounds. The portal of the clinic is in the Art Nouveau style and features the coat of arms of Lower Austria.

== History ==
The clinic was constructed between 1908 and 1910 under a contract from the Lower Austrian Landesregierung (English: provincial parliament). The architects were Karl Otto Limbach and Max Haupt and was originally the location of the Lower Austrian Home for Children (German: Niederösterreichische Landes-Zentralkinderheim). In 1943, the city of Vienna added two pavilions which were the original Semmelweis-Frauenklinik. In 2002, it was subsumed into the Rudolfstiftung Hospital System. As a result of the reorganization of the Vienna Hospital System, the Semmelweis-Frauenklinik is to become a part of the newly created Krankenhaus Nord (English: North Hospital).

The Semmelweis-Frauenklinik treated about 5,500 female inpatients yearly. The clinic houses the Rudolfstiftung Hospital's departments of gynecology and obstetrics and the department of anesthesiology. The seven clinics were focused on diseases of the pelvis, dysplasia, obstetrics, gynecology, psychosomatic dysfunction, and ultrasound for prenatal diagnostics, as well as urogynecology.

The Semmelweis-Frauenklinik also had a wellness center for women, parents, and girls, founded in 1992 by the Institute for Female and Male Health (German: Instituts für Frauen- und Männergesundheit).
