= Ignaz Semmelweis =

Early pioneer of antiseptic procedures

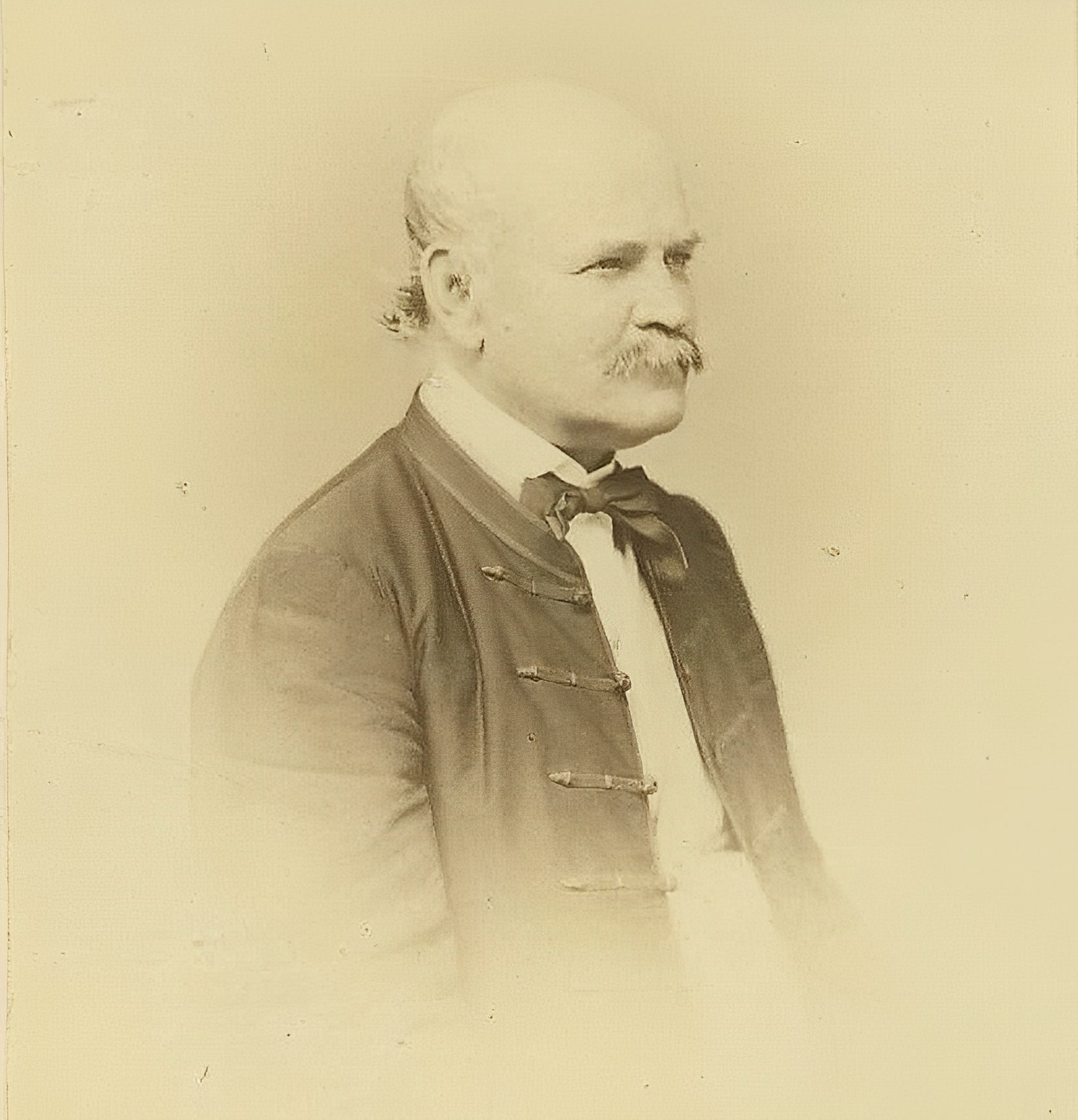
- Semmelweis in 1860
- Born: Semmelweis Ignác Fülöp; 1 July 1818; Buda, Kingdom of Hungary, Austrian Empire
- Died: 13 August 1865 (aged 47); Oberdöbling, Austrian Empire
- Education: University of Vienna (MD, 1844)
- Occupations: Medical doctor, scientist
- Known for: Introducing hand disinfection standards, in obstetrical clinics, from 1847
- Spouse: Mária Weidenhofer (m. 1857)
- Children: 5
- Scientific career
- Fields: Obstetrics, surgeries
- Workplaces: Vienna General Hospital, Szent Rókus Kórház

Ignaz Philipp Semmelweis (German: [ˈɪɡnaːts ˈfɪlɪp ˈzɛml̩vaɪs]; Hungarian: Semmelweis Ignác Fülöp [ˈsɛm(ː)ɛlvɛjs ˈiɡnaːts ˈfyløp]; 1 July 1818 – 13 August 1865) was a Hungarian medical doctor and scientist of German descent who was an early pioneer of antiseptic procedures, known as the "saviour of mothers". Postpartum infection, also known as puerperal fever or childbed fever, was common in the 19th century, and often fatal. Semmelweis demonstrated that the incidence of infection could be drastically reduced by requiring healthcare workers in obstetrical clinics to disinfect their hands. In 1847, he proposed hand washing with chlorinated lime solutions at Vienna General Hospital's First Obstetrical Clinic, where doctors' wards had thrice the mortality of midwives' wards. The maternal mortality rate dropped from 18% to less than 2%, and he published a book of his findings, Etiology, Concept and Prophylaxis of Childbed Fever, in 1861.

Despite his research, Semmelweis's observations conflicted with the established scientific views of the time, and his ideas were rejected by the medical community. He could not offer a theoretical explanation for his findings of reduced mortality due to hand washing; additionally, some doctors were offended by the suggestion that they should wash their hands, and mocked him for it. In 1865, the increasingly outspoken Semmelweis purportedly suffered a nervous breakdown and was committed to an asylum by his colleagues. In the asylum, he was beaten by the guards. He died 14 days later from a gangrenous wound on his right hand that may have been caused by the beating.

Semmelweis's findings only gained widespread acceptance years after his death, when Louis Pasteur confirmed the germ theory of disease, giving Semmelweis's observations a scientific explanation, and Joseph Lister, acting on Pasteur's research, pioneered antiseptic surgical methods with great success.

== Family and early life ==
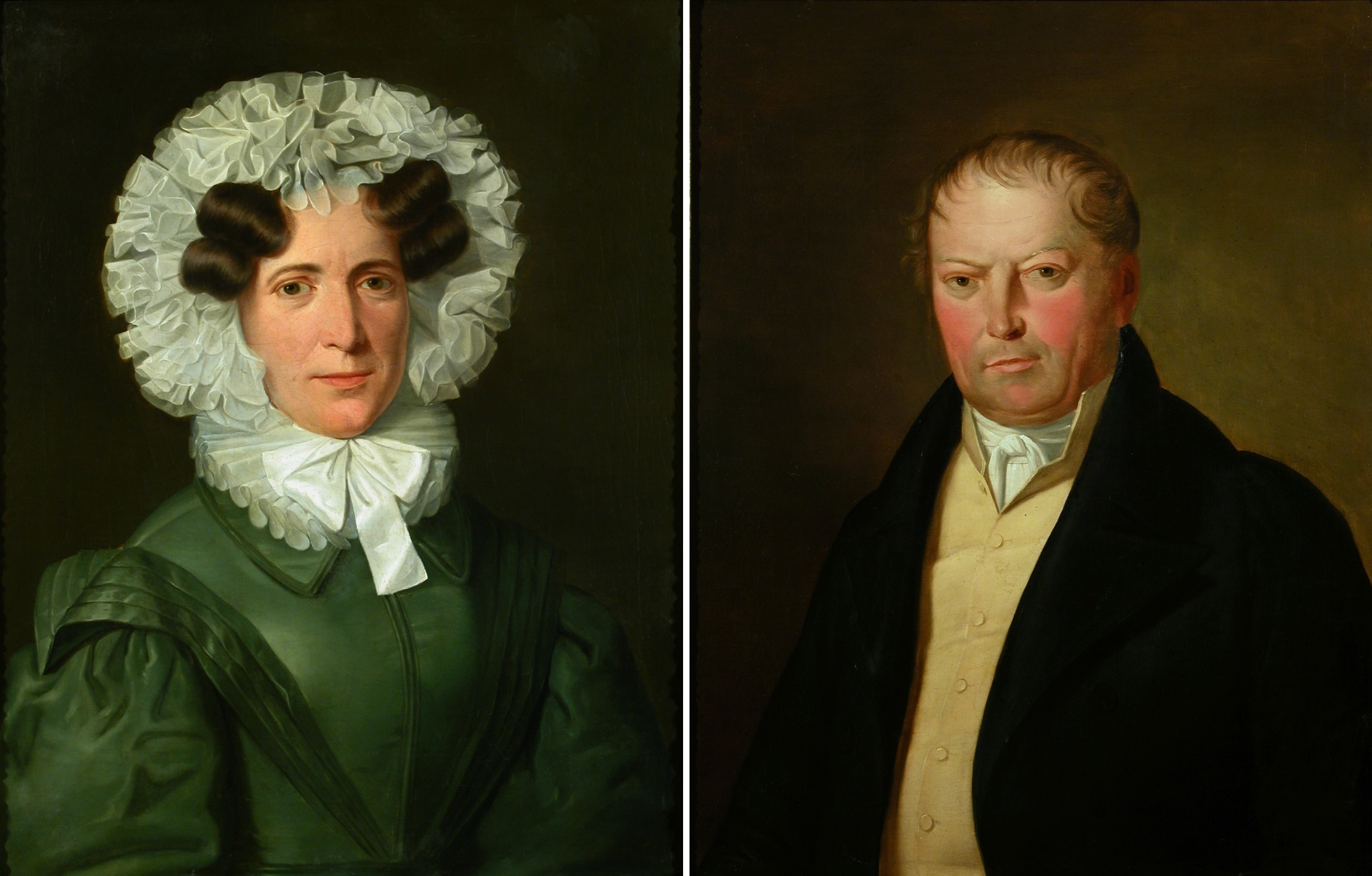
Theresia Müller and Joseph Semmelweis, the parents of Ignaz Semmelweis

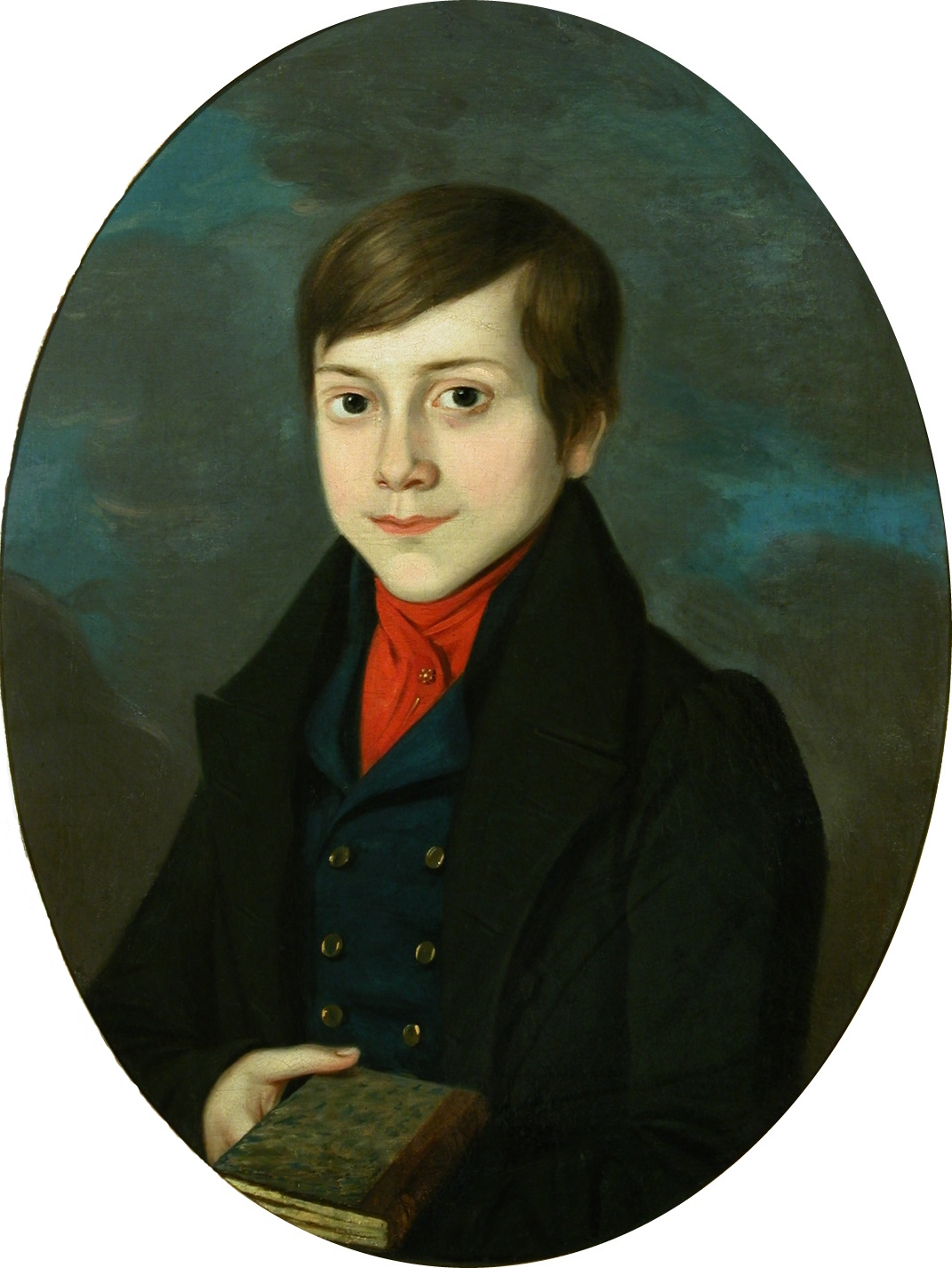
Child portrait of Semmelweis, 1830

Ignaz Semmelweis was born on 1 July 1818 in the Tabán neighbourhood of Buda, Kingdom of Hungary, (Note: Hungary was officially recognized as "(an independent kingdom) within the Habsburg Monarchy". Orsolya Szakaly, "Opportunity or Threat? Napoleon and the Hungarian Estates", in Collaboration and Resistance in Napoleonic Europe, Michael Rowe (ed.), Palgrave Macmillan 2003 ISBN 978-0-333-98454-3) Austrian Empire. He was the fifth child out of 10 of the prosperous grocer family of József Semmelweis and Teréz Müller.

Of German ancestry, his father was an ethnic German born in Kismarton, in the Kingdom of Hungary (now Eisenstadt, Austria), and his mother an ethnic German from Buda. József Semmelweis was granted citizenship in Buda in 1806 and, in the same year, he opened a wholesale business for spices and general consumer goods. (Note: Translated from: Spezereien- und Kolonialwarengroßhandlung) The company was named Zum weißen Elefanten (At the White Elephant) in the Meindl House (today's Semmelweis Museum of Medical History, located at 1–3 Apród Street, Budapest). By 1810, he was a wealthy man and married Teréz Müller, daughter of the coachbuilder Fülöp Müller.

Ignaz began studying law at the University of Vienna in the autumn of 1837, but switched to medicine. He was awarded his doctor of medicine degree in 1844. After failing to obtain an appointment in a clinic for internal medicine, Semmelweis specialized in obstetrics. His teachers included Carl von Rokitansky, Joseph Škoda, and Ferdinand von Hebra.

== Work on cause of child bed fever mortality ==
=== Position at Vienna General Hospital ===
Semmelweis was appointed assistant to Professor Johann Klein in the First Obstetrical Clinic of the Vienna General Hospital on 1 July 1846. (Note: Details: On 1 July 1844 Semmelweis became a trainee physician's assistant at the Vienna maternity clinic (in German, Aspirant Assistentarztes an der Wiener Geburtshilflichen Klinik) and on 1 July 1846 he was appointed an ordinary physician's assistant (in German, ordentlicher Assistentarzt). On 20 October 1846, his predecessor Franz Breit (an obstetrician) returned and Semmelweis was demoted. By 20 March 20 1847, Breit was appointed professor in Tübingen and Semmelweis resumed the Assistentarzt position.)

There were two maternity clinics at the Viennese hospital. The First Clinic had an average maternal mortality rate of about 10% due to puerperal fever. The Second Clinic's rate averaged less than 4%. Women begged to be admitted to the Second Clinic, due to the reputation of the First Clinic. Semmelweis described desperate women begging on their knees not to be admitted to the First Clinic.

Women began purposefully giving birth in the streets, pretending to have given birth en route to the hospital so they could avoid being admitted to the clinic where the risk of infection, birth complications and death were substantially higher.

Semmelweis was puzzled that puerperal fever was rare among women giving street births, prompting his curiosity as to what protected those who delivered outside the clinic.

=== Analysis of childbed fever mortality ===
Troubled by the mortality discrepancy between the two clinics, Semmelweis searched for differences. He excluded overcrowding as a cause since the Second Clinic was always more crowded. He eliminated climate because the two clinics were in close geographical proximity to each other. He altered the position in which mothers gave birth, and proposed that the giving of last rites by priests in the clinic was terrifying women after birth, causing them to develop the fever.

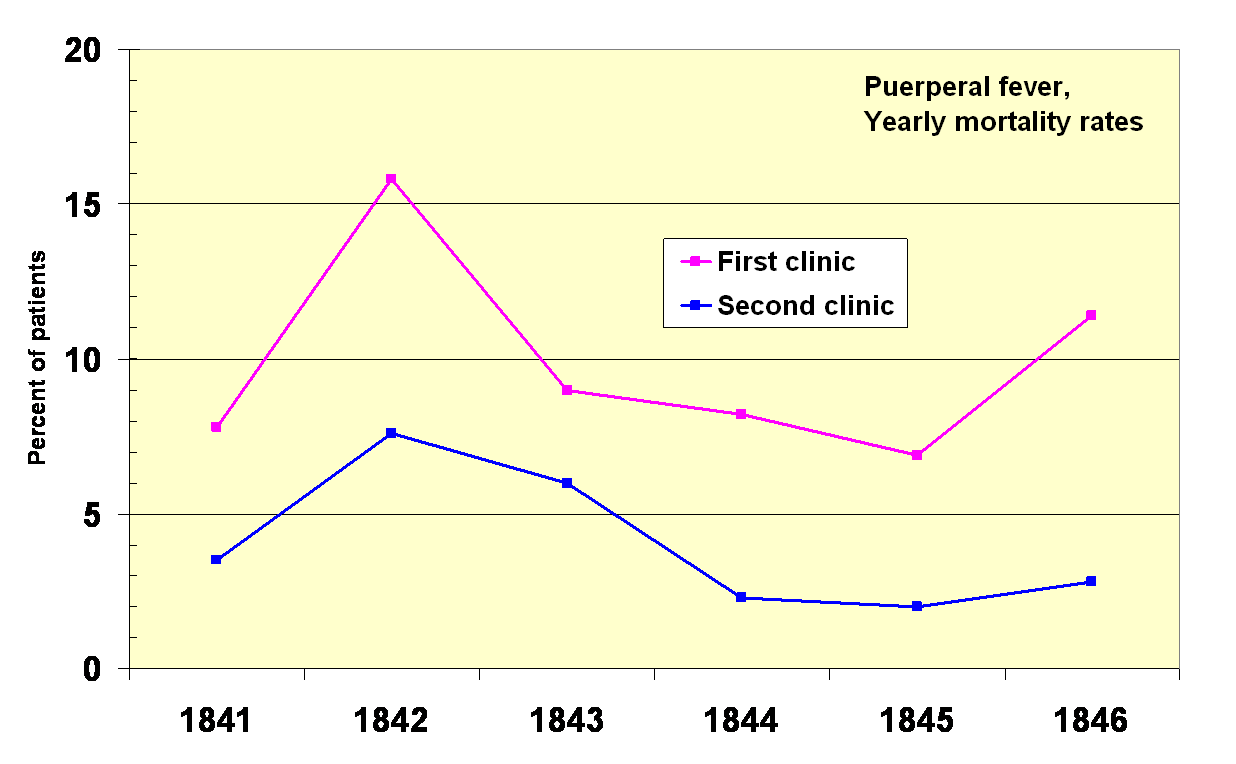
Puerperal fever mortality rates for the First and Second Clinics at the Vienna General Hospital 1841–1846.

Puerperal fever mortality rates for the First and Second Clinic at the Vienna General Hospital 1841–1846.
	First clinic			Second clinic		
Year	Births	Deaths	Rate (%)	Births	Deaths	Rate (%)
1841	3,036	237	7.8	2,442	86	3.5
1842	3,287	518	15.8	2,659	202	7.6
1843	3,060	274	9.0	2,739	164	6.0
1844	3,157	260	8.2	2,956	68	2.3
1845	3,492	241	6.9	3,241	66	2.0
1846	4,010	459	11.4	3,754	105	2.8

=== Theory of cadaverous poisoning ===
Semmelweis' breakthrough occurred in 1847, following the death of his good friend Jakob Kolletschka, who had been accidentally poked with a student's scalpel while performing a post mortem examination. Kolletschka's autopsy showed a pathology similar to that of the women who were dying from puerperal fever. Semmelweis immediately proposed a connection between cadaveric contamination and puerperal fever.

He proposed that he and the medical students carried "cadaverous particles" on their hands (Note: Semmelweis's reference to "cadaverous particles" were (in German) "an der Hand klebende Cadavertheile") from the autopsy room to the patients they examined in the First Obstetrical Clinic. This explained why the student midwives in the Second Clinic, who were not engaged in autopsies and had no contact with corpses, saw a much lower mortality rate.

The germ theory of disease had not yet been accepted in Vienna. Thus, Semmelweis concluded some unknown "cadaverous material" caused childbed fever. He instituted a policy of using a solution of chlorinated lime (calcium hypochlorite) for washing hands between autopsy work and the examination of patients. He did this because he found that this chlorinated solution worked best to remove the putrid smell of infected autopsy tissue, and thus perhaps destroyed the causal "poisonous" or contaminating "cadaveric" agent hypothetically being transmitted by this material. The result was the mortality rate in the First Clinic declined 90% and was then comparable to that in the Second Clinic. The mortality rate in April 1847, before the new hand washing procedures were instituted, was 18.3%. The new procedures started in mid-May leading to lower rates: June 2.2%, July 1.2%, and August 1.9%. In two months in the year following this discovery, for the first time since the introduction of anatomical orientation, the death rate was zero.

== Efforts to reduce childbed fever ==
Semmelweis's hypothesis, that there was only one cause, that the primary factor was cleanliness, was extreme at the time and was largely ignored, rejected, or ridiculed. He was dismissed from the hospital for political reasons and harassed by the medical community in Vienna, being eventually forced to move to Budapest.

Semmelweis was outraged by the indifference of the medical profession and began writing open and increasingly angry letters to prominent European obstetricians, at times denouncing them as irresponsible murderers. His contemporaries, including his wife, presumed he was losing his mind, and in 1865, nearly 20 years after his breakthrough, he was committed to the Landesirrenanstalt Döbling (provincial lunatic asylum). He died there of septic shock only 14 days later, possibly as the result of being severely beaten by guards. Semmelweis's practice earned widespread acceptance only years after his death when Louis Pasteur further developed the germ theory of disease, offering a theoretical explanation for Semmelweis's findings. He is considered a pioneer of antiseptic procedures.

=== Conflict with established medical opinion ===
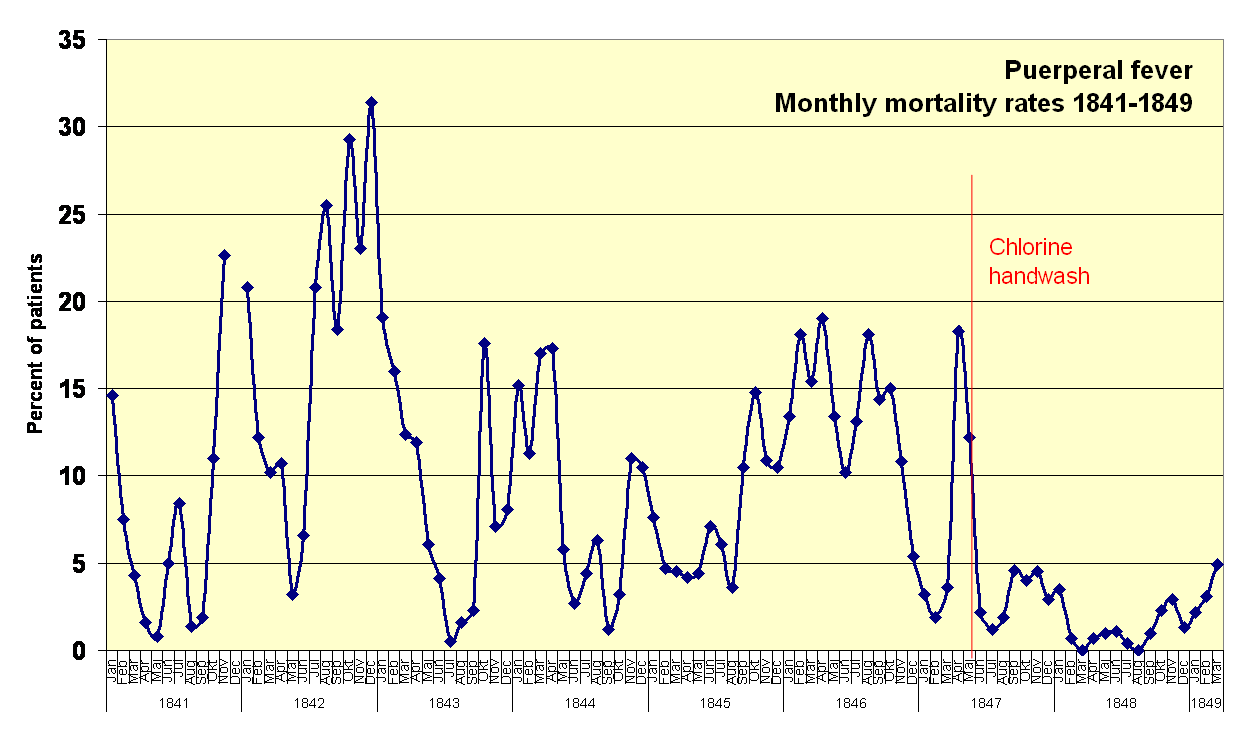
Puerperal fever monthly mortality rates for the First Clinic at Vienna Maternity Institution 1841–1849. Rates drop markedly when Semmelweis implemented chlorine hand washing mid-May 1847 (see rates).

Semmelweis's observations conflicted with the established scientific and medical opinions of the time. The theory of diseases was highly influenced by ideas of an imbalance of the basic "four humours" in the body, a theory known as dyscrasia, for which the main treatment was bloodlettings. Medical texts at the time emphasized that each case of disease was unique, the result of a personal imbalance, and the main difficulty of the medical profession was to establish precisely each patient's unique situation, case by case.

The findings from autopsies of deceased women also showed a confusing multitude of physical signs, which emphasized the assumption that puerperal fever was not one, but many different, yet unidentified, diseases.

Also, some historians of science argue that resistance to path-breaking contributions of obscure scientists is common and "constitutes the single most formidable block to scientific advances".

As a result, his ideas were rejected by the medical community. Other, subtler factors may also have played a role. Some doctors, for instance, were offended at the suggestion that they should wash their hands, feeling that their social status as gentlemen was inconsistent with the idea that their hands could be unclean. (Note: See for instance Charles Delucena Meigs, in which there is a link to an original source document.)

Semmelweis's results lacked scientific explanation at the time. That became possible only in the 1860s and 1870s, when Louis Pasteur, Joseph Lister, Robert Koch, and others further developed the germ theory of disease.

During 1848, Semmelweis widened the scope of his washing protocol, to include all instruments coming in contact with patients in labour, and used mortality rates time series to document his success in virtually eliminating puerperal fever from the hospital ward.

=== Hesitant publication of results and first signs of trouble ===
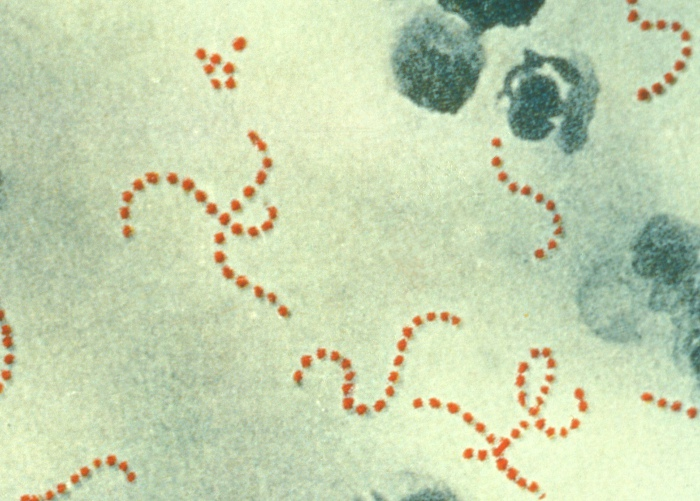
Streptococcus pyogenes (red-stained spheres) is responsible for most cases of severe puerperal fever. It is commonly found in the throat and nasopharynx of otherwise healthy carriers.

Toward the end of 1847, accounts of the work of Semmelweis (as well as the similar conclusions of Oliver Wendell Holmes Sr., working in the United States of America) began to spread around Europe. Semmelweis and his students wrote letters to the directors of several prominent maternity clinics describing their recent observations. Ferdinand von Hebra, the editor of a leading Austrian medical journal, announced Semmelweis's discovery in the December 1847 and April 1848 issues of the medical journal. Hebra claimed that Semmelweis's work had a practical significance comparable to that of Edward Jenner's introduction of cowpox inoculations to prevent smallpox.

In late 1848, one of Semmelweis's former students wrote a lecture explaining Semmelweis's work. The lecture was presented before the Royal Medical and Surgical Society in London and a review published in The Lancet, a prominent medical journal. (Note: The author of the lecture was Charles Henry Felix Routh, but it was delivered by Edward William Murphy since Routh was not a Fellow of the Royal Medical and Surgical Society. (Lecture: On the Causes of the Endemic Puerperal Fever of Vienna, Medico-chirurgical Transactions 32(1849): 27–40. Review: Lancet 2(1848): 642f.) For a list of some other reviews, see Frank P. Murphy, "Ignaz Philipp Semmelweis (1818–1865): An Annotated Bibliography," Bulletin of the History of Medicine 20 (1946), 653–707: 654f.) A few months later, another of Semmelweis's former students published a similar essay in a French periodical.

As accounts of the dramatic reduction in mortality rates in Vienna were being circulated throughout Europe, Semmelweis had reason to expect that the chlorine washings would be widely adopted, saving tens of thousands of lives. Early responses to his work also gave clear signs of coming trouble, however. Some physicians had clearly misinterpreted his claims. Additionally, initial responses to Semmelweis's findings tended to downplay their significance by arguing that he had said nothing new. James Young Simpson, for instance, saw no difference between Semmelweis's groundbreaking findings and the idea presented in an 1843 paper by Oliver Wendell Holmes Sr. that childbed fever was contagious (i.e. that infected persons could pass the infection to others).

In fact, Semmelweis was warning against all decaying organic matter, not just against a specific contagion that originated from victims of childbed fever themselves. This misunderstanding, and others like it, occurred partly because Semmelweis's work was known only through secondhand reports written by his colleagues and students. At this crucial stage, Semmelweis himself had published nothing. These and similar misinterpretations continued to cloud discussions of his work throughout the century.

Some accounts emphasize that Semmelweis neither wished to communicate his method officially to the learned circles of Vienna, nor was eager to explain it on paper.

=== Political turmoil and dismissal from the Vienna hospital ===
In 1848, a series of tumultuous revolutions swept across Europe. The resulting political turmoil would affect Semmelweis's career. In Vienna on 13 March 1848, students demonstrated in favor of increased civil rights, including trial by jury and freedom of expression. The demonstrations were led by medical students and young faculty members and were joined by workers from the suburbs. Two days later in Hungary, demonstrations and uprisings led to the Hungarian Revolution of 1848 and a full-scale war against the ruling Habsburgs of the Austrian Empire. In Vienna, the March demonstration was followed by months of general unrest.

No evidence indicates Semmelweis was personally involved in the events of 1848. Some of his brothers were punished for active participation in the Hungarian independence movement, and the Hungarian-born Semmelweis likely was sympathetic to the cause. Semmelweis's superior, professor Johann Klein, was a conservative Austrian, likely uneasy with the independence movements and alarmed by the other revolutions of 1848 in the Habsburg areas. Klein probably mistrusted Semmelweis.

When Semmelweis's term was about to expire, Carl Braun also applied for the position of "assistant" in the First Clinic, possibly at Klein's own invitation. Semmelweis and Braun were the only two applicants for the post. Semmelweis's predecessor, Franz Breit, had been granted a two-year extension. Semmelweis's application for an extension was supported by Joseph Škoda and Carl von Rokitansky and by most of the medical faculty, but Klein chose Braun for the position. Semmelweis was obliged to leave the obstetrical clinic when his term expired on 20 March 1849.

The day his term expired, Semmelweis petitioned the Viennese authorities to be made docent of obstetrics. A docent was a private lecturer who taught students and who had access to some university facilities. At first, because of Klein's opposition, Semmelweis's petition was denied. He reapplied, but had to wait until 10 October 1850 (more than 18 months), before finally being appointed docent of 'theoretical' obstetrics. The terms refused him access to cadavers and limited him to teaching students by using leather-fabricated mannequins only. A few days after being notified of his appointment, Semmelweis left Vienna abruptly and returned to Pest. He apparently left without so much as saying goodbye to his former friends and colleagues, a move that might have offended them. According to his own account, he left Vienna because he was "unable to endure further frustrations in dealing with the Viennese medical establishment".

=== Life in Budapest ===
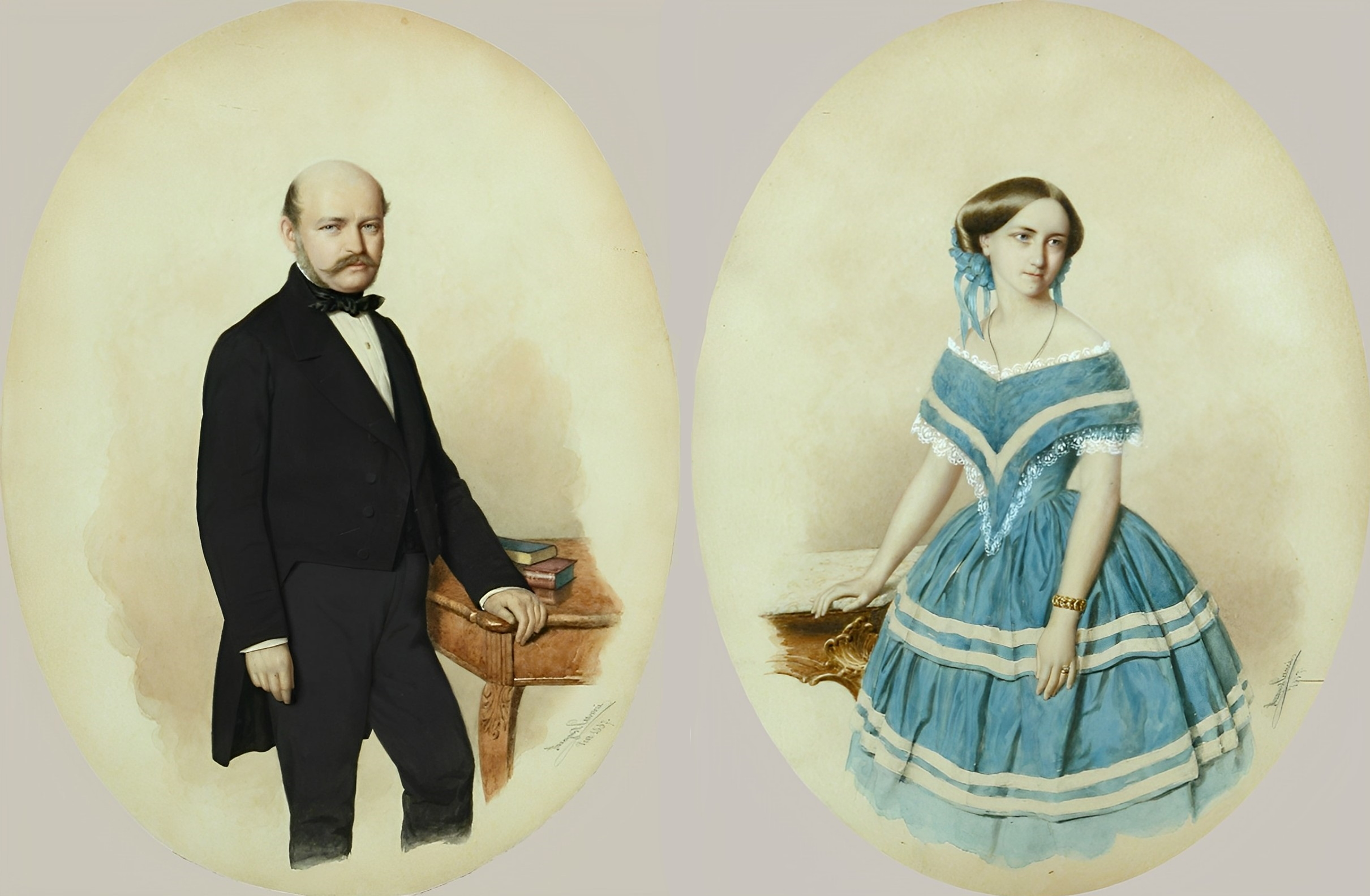
Wedding portraits of Semmelweis and Mária Weidenhofer by Ágost Canzi (1857)

During 1848–1849, some 70,000 troops from the Habsburg-ruled Austrian Empire thwarted the Hungarian independence movement, executed or imprisoned its leaders and in the process destroyed parts of Pest. Semmelweis, upon arriving from the Habsburg Vienna in 1850, likely was not warmly welcomed in Pest.

On 20 May 1851, Semmelweis took the relatively insignificant, unpaid, honorary head-physician position of the obstetric ward of Pest's small Szent Rókus Hospital. He held that position for six years, until June 1857. Childbed fever was rampant at the clinic; at a visit in 1850, just after returning to Pest, Semmelweis found one fresh corpse, another patient in severe agony, and four others seriously ill with the disease. After taking over in 1851, Semmelweis virtually eliminated the disease. During 1851–1855, only eight patients died from childbed fever out of 933 births (0.85%).

Despite the impressive results, Semmelweis's ideas were not accepted by the other obstetricians in Budapest. The professor of obstetrics at the University of Pest, Ede Flórián Birly, never adopted Semmelweis's methods, continuing to believe that puerperal fever was due to uncleanliness of the bowel; therefore, extensive purging was the preferred treatment.

After Birly died in 1854, Semmelweis applied for the position. So did Carl Braun—Semmelweis's nemesis and successor as Johann Klein's assistant in Vienna—and Braun received more votes from his Hungarian colleagues than Semmelweis did. Semmelweis was eventually appointed in 1855, but only because the Viennese authorities overruled the wishes of the Hungarians, as Braun did not speak Hungarian. As professor of obstetrics, Semmelweis instituted chlorine washings at the University of Pest maternity clinic. Once again, the results were impressive.

Semmelweis declined an offer in 1857 to become professor of obstetrics at the University of Zurich. The same year, Semmelweis married Mária Weidenhofer (1837–1910), 19 years his junior and the daughter of a successful merchant in Pest. They had five children.

=== Response by the medical community ===
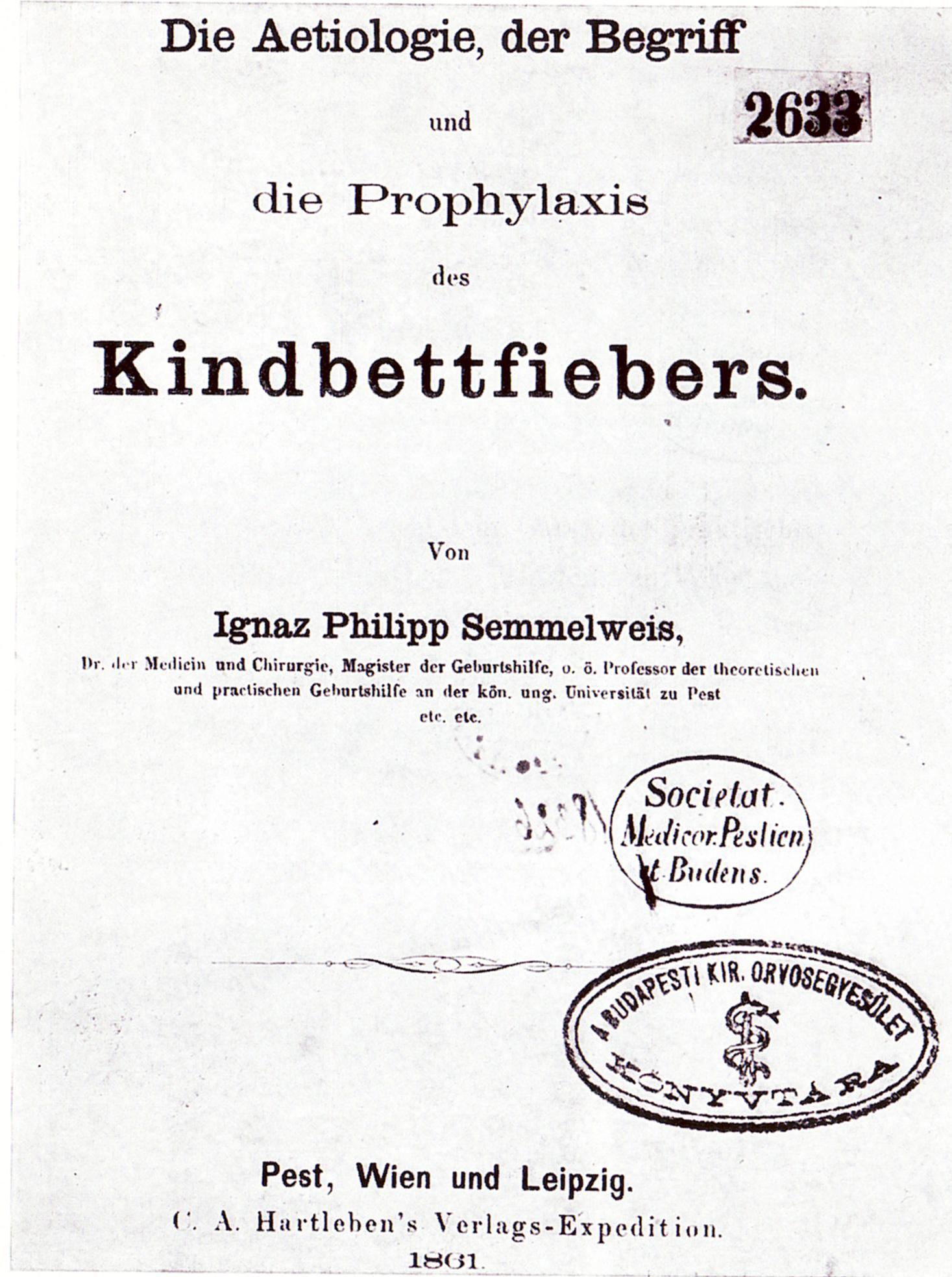
Semmelweis's main work: Die Ätiologie, der Begriff und die Prophylaxis des Kindbettfiebers, 1861 (front page)

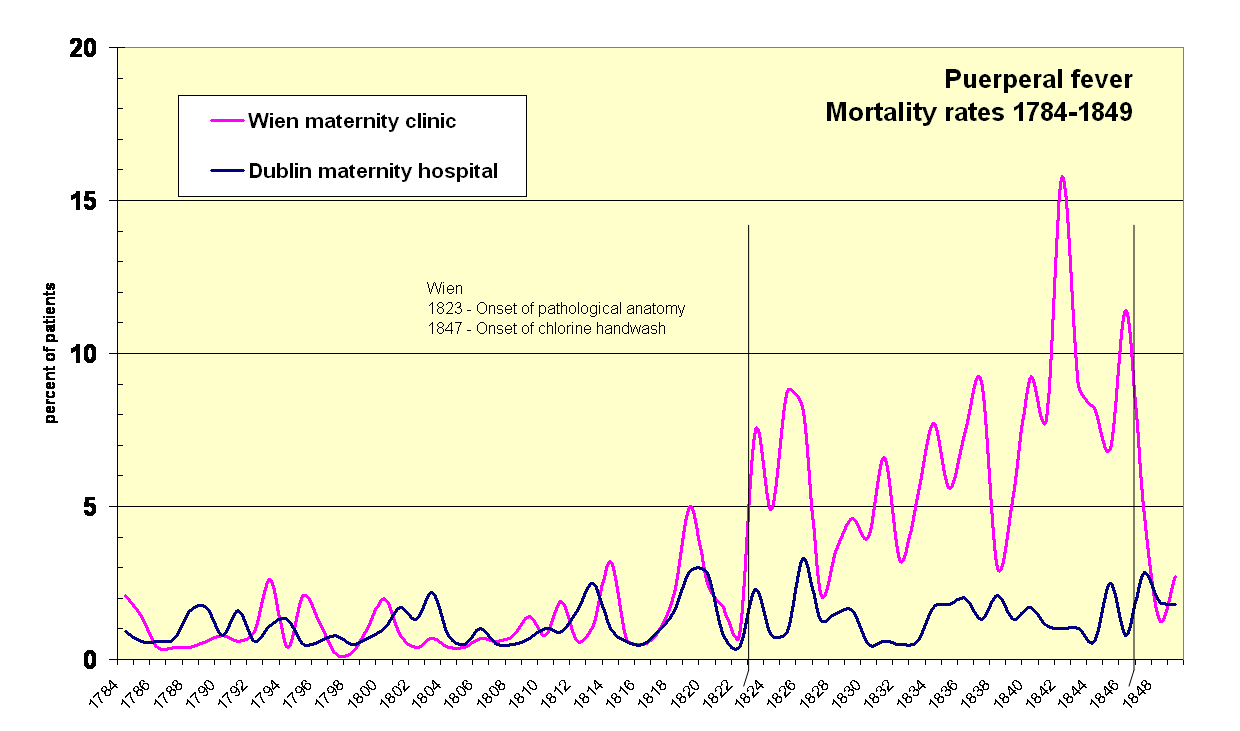
In his 1861 book, Semmelweis presented evidence to demonstrate that the advent of pathological anatomy in Wien (Vienna) in 1823 (vertical line) was accompanied by the increased incidence of fatal childbed fever. The second vertical line marks introduction of chlorine hand washing in 1847. Rates for the Dublin Rotunda maternity hospital, which had no pathological anatomy, are shown for comparison (view rates).

Semmelweis's views were much more favorably received in the United Kingdom than on the continent, but he was more often cited than understood. The British consistently regarded Semmelweis as having supported their theory of contagion. A typical example was W. Tyler Smith, who claimed that Semmelweis "made out very conclusively" that "miasms derived from the dissecting room will excite puerperal disease." One of the first to respond to Semmelweis's 1848 communications was James Young Simpson, who wrote a stinging letter. Simpson surmised that the British obstetrical literature must be totally unknown in Vienna, or Semmelweis would have known that the British had long regarded childbed fever as contagious and would have employed chlorine washing to protect against it.

In 1856, Semmelweis's assistant Josef Fleischer reported the successful results of hand washing activities at St. Rochus and Pest maternity institutions in the Viennese Medical Weekly (Wiener Medizinische Wochenschrift). The editor remarked sarcastically that it was time people stopped being misled about the theory of chlorine washings. Two years later, Semmelweis published his own account of his work in an essay entitled "The Etiology of Childbed Fever". (Note: The report was "A gyermekágyi láz kóroktana" ("The Etiology of Childbed Fever") published in Orvosi hetilap 2 (1858); a translation into German is included in Tiberius von Györy's, Semmelweis's gesammelte Werke (Jena: Gustav Fischer, 1905), 61–83. This was Semmelweis's first publication on the subject of puerperal fever. According to Győry, the substance of the report was contained in lectures delivered before the Budapester Königliche Ârzteverein in the spring of 1858.) Two years after that, he published a second essay, "The Difference in Opinion between Myself and the English Physicians regarding Childbed Fever". (Note: The article was originally published as: Ignaz Philipp Semmelweis, "A gyermekágyi láz fölötti véleménykülönbség köztem s az angol orvosok közt" Orvosi hetilap 4 (1860), 849–851, 873–876, 889–893, 913–915.) In 1861, Semmelweis published his main work Die Ätiologie, der Begriff und die Prophylaxis des Kindbettfiebers (German for "The Etiology, Concept and Prophylaxis of Childbed Fever"). (Note: Digital copy of Semmelweis' book) In his 1861 book, Semmelweis lamented the slow adoption of his ideas: "Most medical lecture halls continue to resound with lectures on epidemic childbed fever and with discourses against my theories. [...] In published medical works my teachings are either ignored or attacked. The medical faculty at Würzburg awarded a prize to a monograph written in 1859 in which my teachings were rejected". (Note: The monograph to which Semmelweis refers was a work by Heinrich Silberschmidt, "Historisch-kritische Darstellung der Pathologie des Kindbettfiebers von den ältesten Zeiten bis auf die unserige", published 1859 in Erlangen, which mentions Semmelweis only incidentally and without dealing at all with the transfer of toxic materials by the hands of physicians and midwives. The book was awarded a prize by the medical faculty of Würzburg at the instigation of Friedrich Wilhelm Scanzoni von Lichtenfels)

In a textbook, Carl Braun, Semmelweis's successor as assistant in the first clinic, identified 30 causes of childbed fever; only the 28th of these was cadaverous infection. Other supposed causes included conception and pregnancy, uremia, pressure exerted on adjacent organs by the shrinking uterus, emotional traumata, mistakes in diet, chilling, and atmospheric epidemic influences. (Note: Carl Braun's thirty causes appear in his Lehrbuch der Geburtshülfe. In the first of these, published in 1855, he mentions Semmelweis in connection with his discussion of cause number 28, cadaverous poisoning. In the later version, however, although he discusses the same cause in the same terms, all references to Semmelweis have been dropped.)

Despite this opposition, Braun, who was Assistant in the First Division in the period April 1849 to summer 1853, maintained a relatively low mortality rate in the First Division, roughly consistent with the rate Semmelweis himself achieved, as mortality rates in the period April 1849 to end 1853 show. These results suggest that Braun continued, assiduously, to require the chlorine washings.

At a conference of German physicians and natural scientists, most of the speakers rejected his doctrine, including the celebrated Rudolf Virchow, who was a scientist of the highest authority of his time. Virchow's great authority in medical circles contributed potently to Semmelweis' lack of recognition. Besides the persistent rejection (explained further-above) by his predecessor, the professor of obstetrics Ede Flórián Birly, August Breisky, an obstetrician in Prague, dismissed Semmelweis's book as naïve and referred to it as "the Koran of puerperal theology". Breisky objected that Semmelweis had not proved that puerperal fever and pyemia are identical, and he insisted that other factors beyond decaying organic matter certainly had to be included in the etiology of the disease. Carl Edvard Marius Levy, head of the Copenhagen maternity hospital and an outspoken critic of Semmelweis's ideas, had reservations concerning the unspecific nature of cadaverous particles and that the supposed quantities were unreasonably small. In fact, Robert Koch later used precisely this fact to prove that various infecting materials contained living organisms which could reproduce in the human body; that is, since the poison could be neither chemical nor physical in operation, it must be biological.

It has been contended that Semmelweis could have had an even greater impact if he had managed to communicate his findings more effectively and avoid antagonising the medical establishment, even given the opposition from entrenched viewpoints.

== Breakdown and death ==
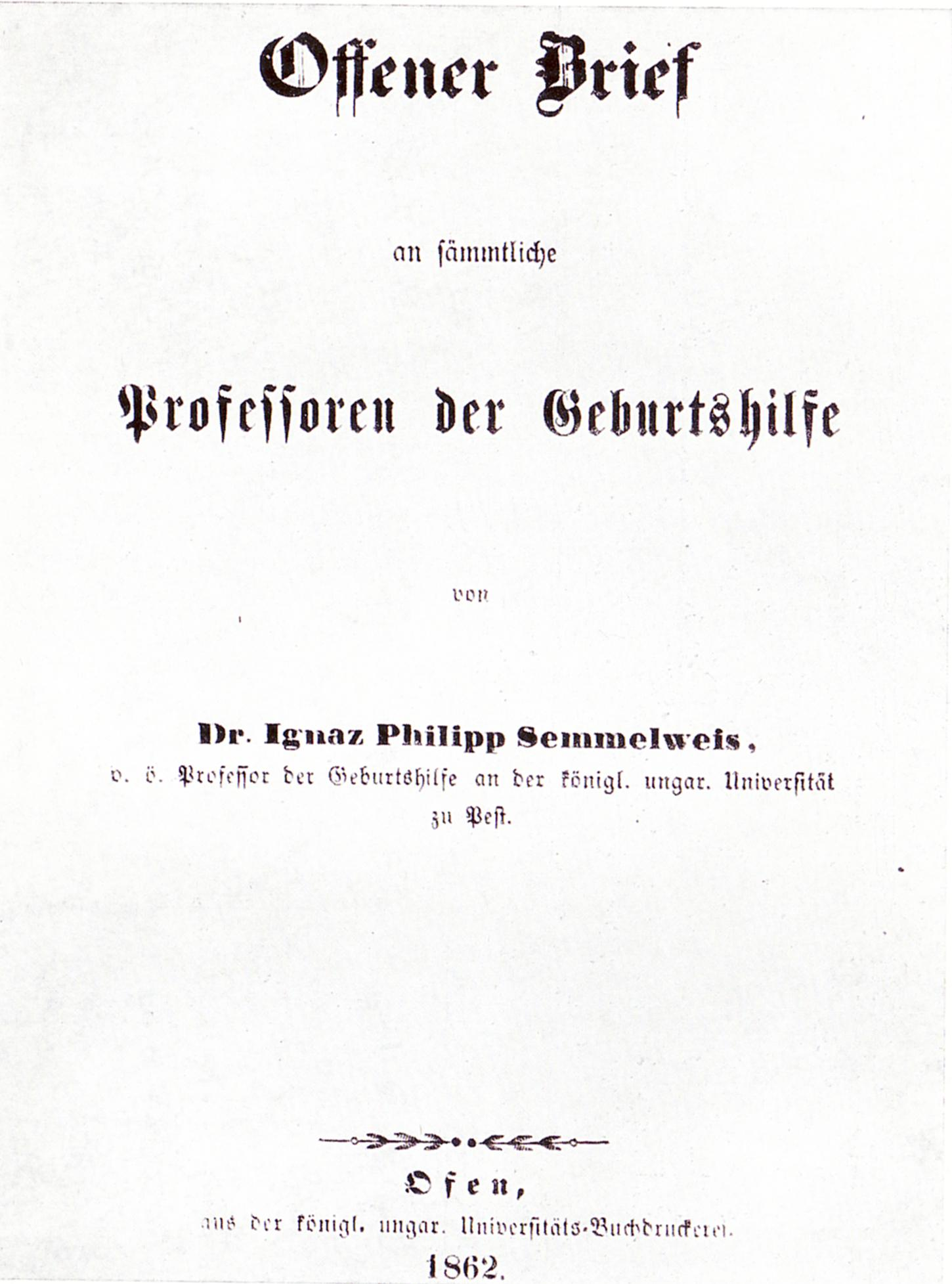
Semmelweis's 1862 Open Letter to all Professors of Obstetrics

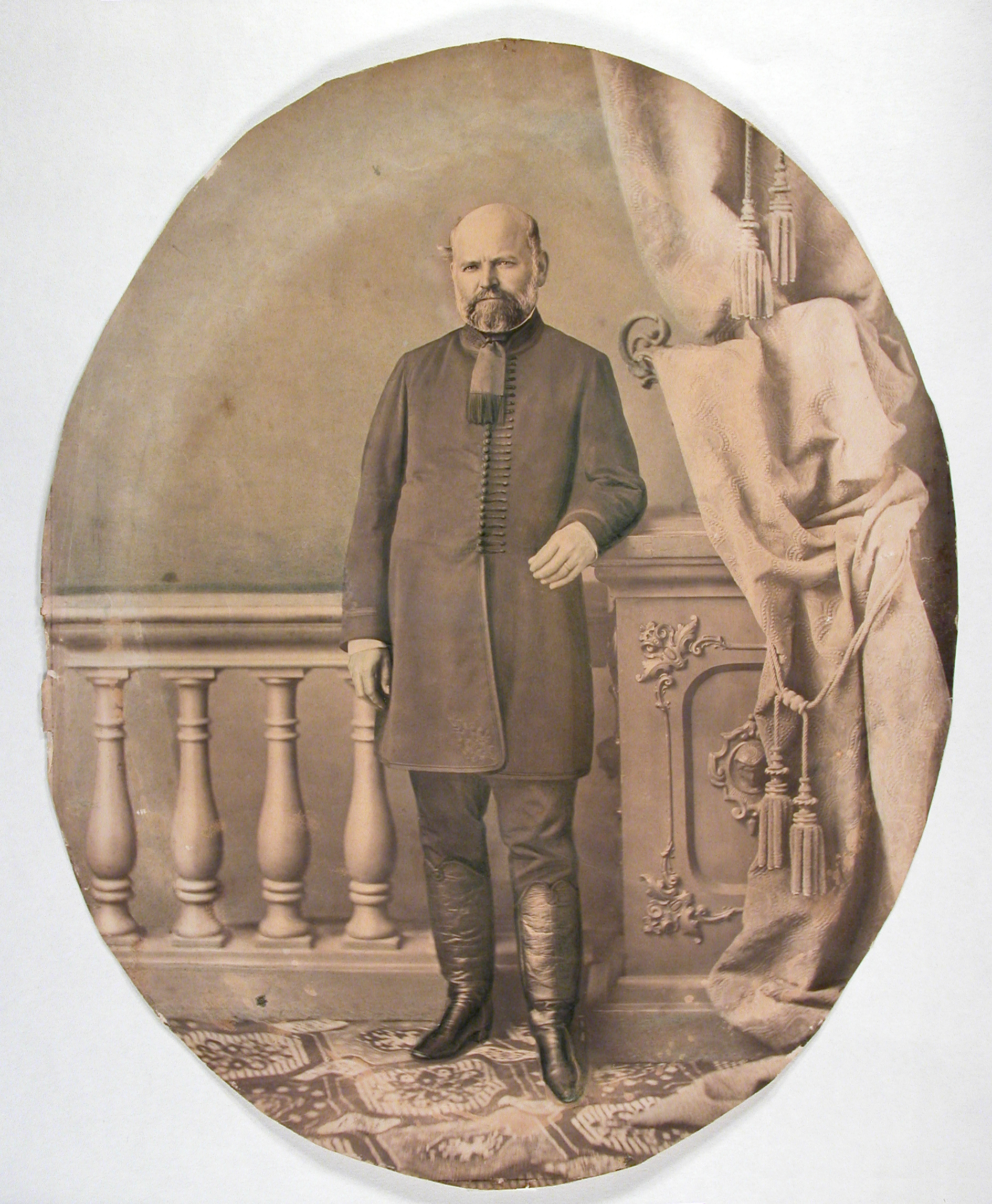
The last photograph of Ignaz Semmelweis from 1864

After a number of unfavorable foreign reviews of his 1861 book, Semmelweis lashed out against his critics in a series of open letters. (Note: The 1862 open letter is available at the Austrian national library website.) They were addressed to various prominent European obstetricians, including Späth, Scanzoni, Siebold, and to "all obstetricians". They were "highly polemical and superlatively offensive", at times denouncing his critics as irresponsible murderers or ignoramuses. He also called upon Siebold to arrange a meeting of German obstetricians somewhere in Germany to provide a forum for discussions on puerperal fever, where he would stay "until all have been converted to his theory."

In mid-1865, his public behaviour became exasperating and embarrassing to his associates. He also began to drink immoderately; he spent progressively more time away from his family, sometimes in the company of a prostitute; and his wife noticed changes in his sexual behavior. On 13 July 1865, the Semmelweis family visited friends, and during the visit, Semmelweis's behavior seemed particularly inappropriate.

Semmelweis's alleged affliction has been a subject of some debate. According to K. Codell Carter, in his biography of Semmelweis, its exact nature cannot be determined:

It is impossible to appraise the nature of Semmelweis's disorder. ... It might have been Alzheimer's disease, a type of dementia, which is associated with rapid cognitive decline and mood changes. It might have been third-stage syphilis, a then-common disease of obstetricians who examined thousands of women at gratis institutions, or it might have been emotional exhaustion from overwork and stress.

In 1865, János Balassa wrote a document referring Semmelweis to a mental institution. On 30 July, Ferdinand Ritter von Hebra lured him, under the pretense of visiting one of Hebra's "new Institutes", to a Viennese insane asylum located in Lazarettgasse (Landes-Irren-Anstalt in der Lazarettgasse). Semmelweis surmised what was happening and tried to leave. He was severely beaten by several guards, secured in a straitjacket, and confined to a darkened cell. Apart from the straitjacket, treatments at the mental institution included dousing with cold water and administering castor oil, a laxative. He died after two weeks, on 13 August 1865, aged 47, from a gangrenous wound, due to an infection on his right hand which might have been caused by the struggle. The autopsy gave the cause of death as pyemia (blood poisoning).

Semmelweis was buried in Vienna on 15 August 1865. Only a few people attended the service. Brief announcements of his death appeared in a few medical periodicals in Vienna and Budapest. Although the rules of the Hungarian Association of Physicians and Natural Scientists specified that a commemorative address be delivered in honor of a member who had died in the preceding year, there was no address for Semmelweis; his death was never even mentioned.

János Diescher was appointed Semmelweis's successor at the Pest University maternity clinic. Immediately, mortality rates increased sixfold to 6%, but the physicians of Budapest said nothing; there were no inquiries and no protests. Almost no one — either in Vienna or in Budapest — seemed to have been willing to acknowledge Semmelweis's life and work.

His remains were transferred to Budapest in 1891. On 11 October 1964, they were transferred once more to the house in which he was born. The house at 1-3 Apród utca is now a museum of medical history, honoring Ignaz Semmelweis.

== Legacy ==
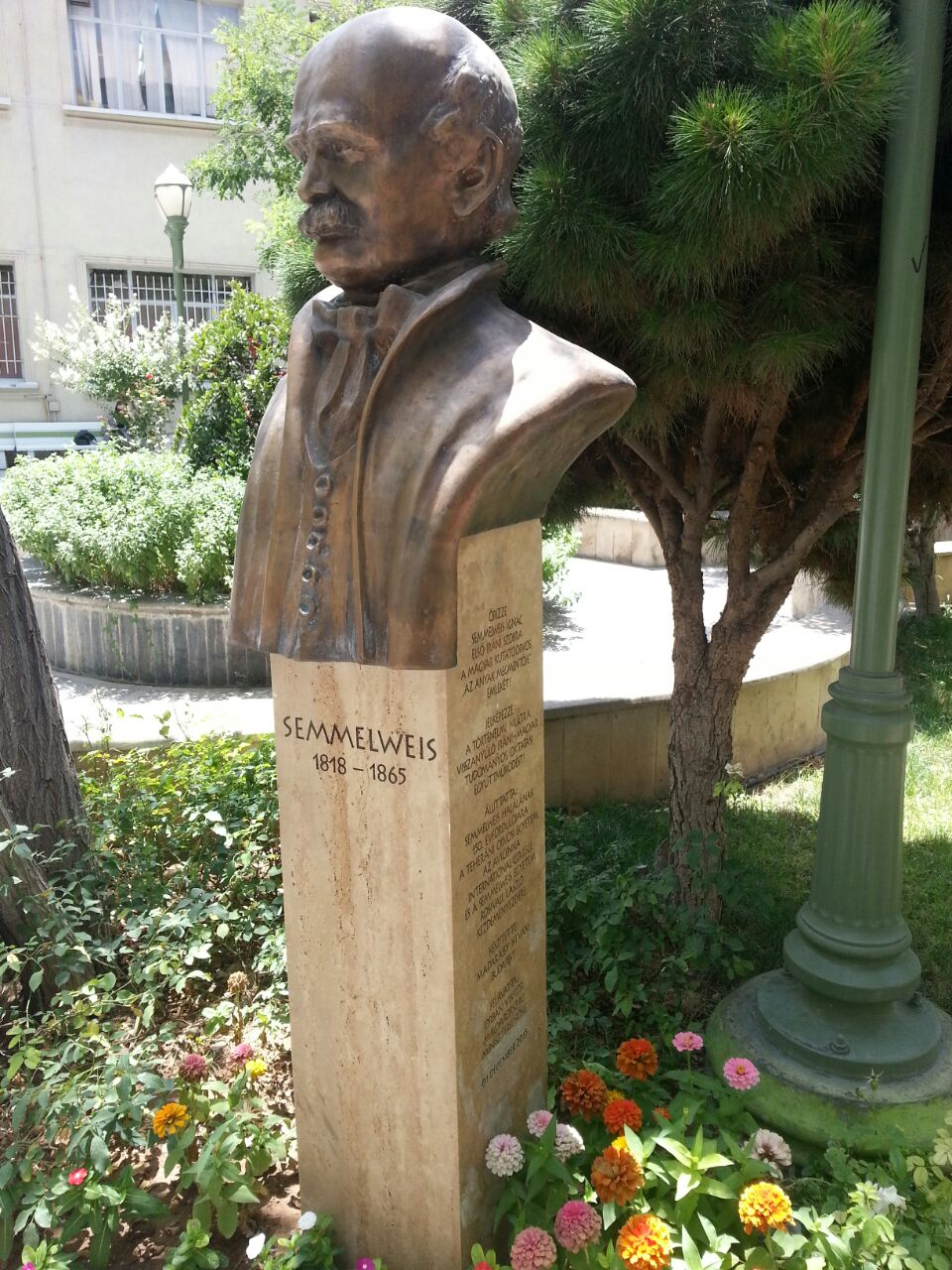
Semmelweis statue at the University of Tehran

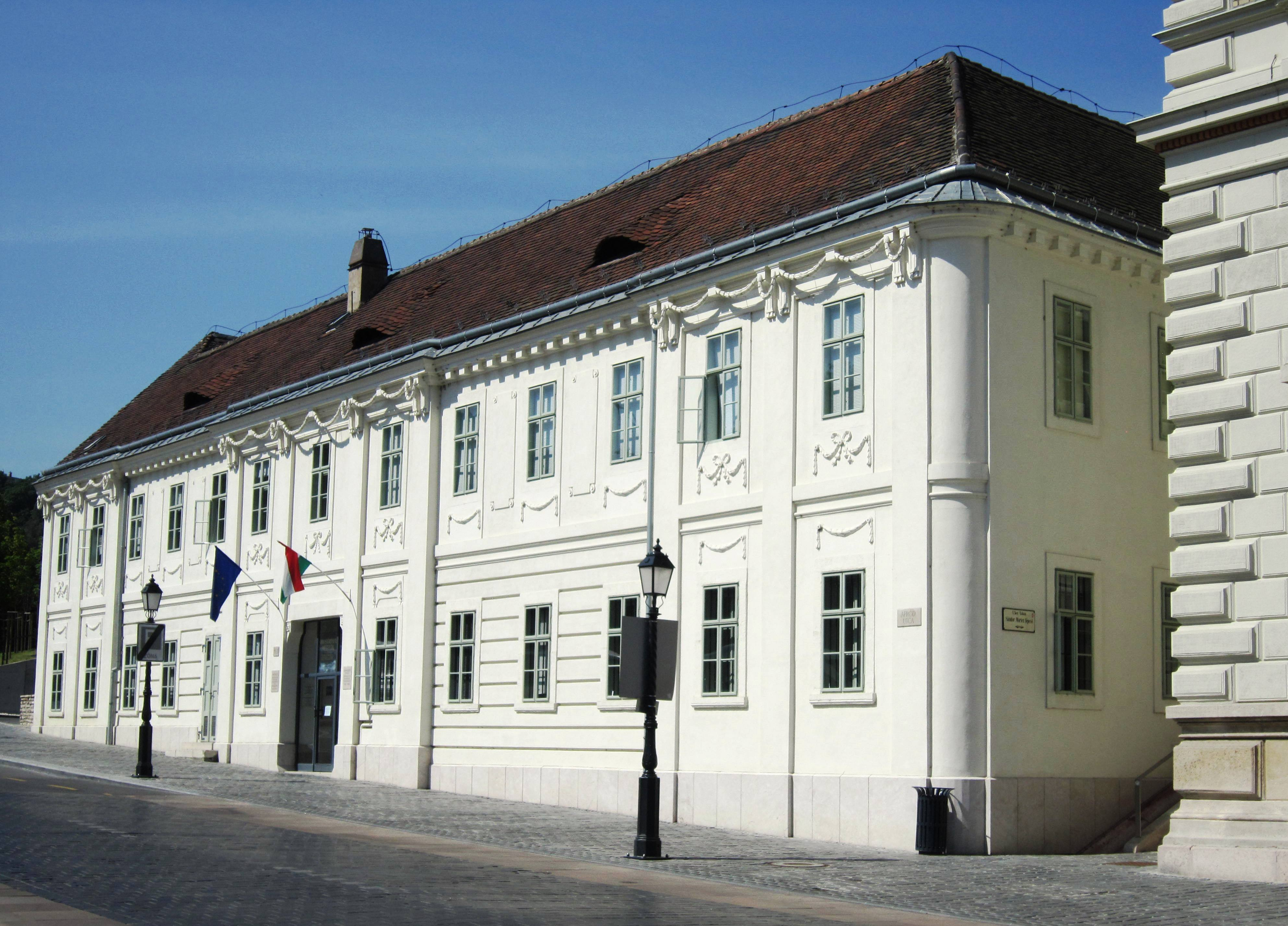
His birthplace, now Semmelweis Museum of Medical History

Semmelweis' advice on chlorine washings was probably more influential than he realized. Many doctors, particularly in Germany, appeared quite willing to experiment with the practical hand washing measures that he proposed—although virtually everyone rejected his basic and ground-breaking innovation: that the disease had only one cause, lack of cleanliness. Gustav Adolf Michaelis, a professor at a maternity institution in Kiel, replied positively to Semmelweis' suggestions, but eventually committed suicide, feeling responsible for the death of his own cousin, whom he had examined after she gave birth. Alternatively, it was the death of his niece, among others, which led him to despair.

Only belatedly did his observational evidence gain wide acceptance. More than twenty years later, Louis Pasteur's work on the germ theory of disease offered a theoretical explanation for Semmelweis' observations. Consequently, the Semmelweis story is often used in university courses with epistemology content, e.g. philosophy of science courses—to support fringe philosophies regarding scientific information, supposedly providing a historical account of which types of knowledge count as scientific (and thus accepted) knowledge, and which do not. C. Hempel, just to mention one, dedicated the first pages of his Philosophy of Natural Science to Semmelweis, arguing that the latter's method is typical of contemporary scientific research, in that the doctor framed a series of hypotheses, verifying them through falsifying experiments in accordance with Hempel's deductive-nomological model. It has been seen as an irony that Semmelweis' critics considered themselves positivists, but the rejection of his work demonstrated the flaws of positivism in the face of theories which seem magical or superstitious, such as the idea that "corpse particles" might turn a person into a corpse, with no causal mechanism being stipulated, after a simple contact. To his contemporaries, Semmelweis seemed to be reverting to the speculative theories of earlier decades that were so repugnant to his positivist contemporaries.

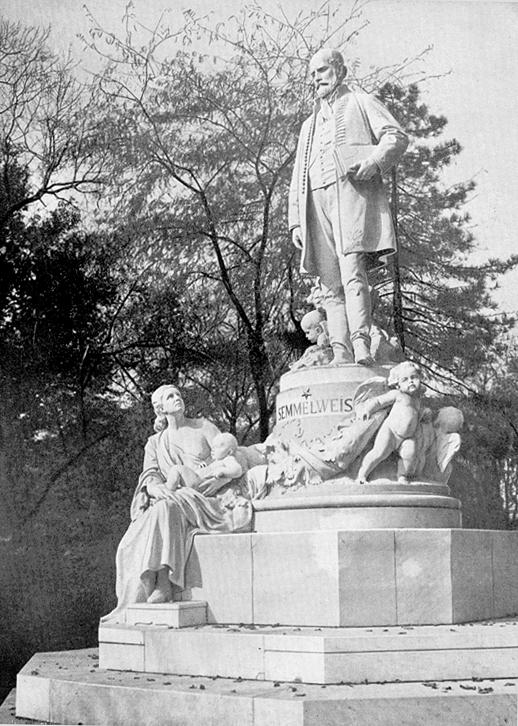
Statue of Semmelweis in front of Szent Rókus Hospital, Budapest, Hungary (erected in 1904, work of Alajos Stróbl)

Because his ideas were ridiculed and rejected by his contemporaries, a cognitive bias called the Semmelweis reflex has been established, which describes a trait of human behaviour characterized by an automatic rejection of new knowledge because it contradicts entrenched norms, assumptions, or paradigms.

Other legacies of Semmelweis include:

- Semmelweis is now recognized as a pioneer of antiseptic policy.
- Semmelweis University, a university for medicine and health-related disciplines, located in Budapest, Hungary.
- The Semmelweis Museum of Medical History is located in the house where he was born.
- The Semmelweis Klinik, a hospital for women located in Vienna, Austria.
- The Semmelweis Hospital in Miskolc, Hungary.
- The Semmelweis Hospital in Kiskunhalas, Hungary.
- In 2008, an image of Semmelweis was selected as the obverse of an Austrian commemorative coin.
- Minor planet 4170 Semmelweis is named after him.
- A postage stamp was issued by Hungary on 1 July 1932 in the "Famous Hungarians" series: Stamp:Ignác Semmelweis (1818~1865), physician.
- A postage stamp was issued by Hungary on 5 December 1954 in the "Scientists" series.
- Inclusion as a Google Doodle, beginning on 20 March 2020, to promote handwashing during the COVID-19 pandemic.
- The Ignác Semmelweis Prize, the most prestigious Hungarian medical award.
- On 13 January 2023, a bust of Semmelweis was unveiled at the Queen Mary University of London.

=== Films ===
- That Mothers Might Live (1938), US, MGM, director: Fred Zinnemann. Played by Shepperd Strudwick. Oscar for the best short film
- Semmelweis (1940), Hungary, Mester Film, director: André de Toth. Played by Tivadar Uray
- Semmelweis – Retter der Mütter (1950), East Germany, DEFA, director: Georg C. Klaren. Played by Karl Paryla
- Ignaz Semmelweis: Gynecologist (1989), West Germany/Austria/Hungary, ZDF/ORF, director: Michael Verhoeven. Played by Heiner Lauterbach
- Semmelweis (1994), the Netherlands, Humanistische Omroep Stichting, director: Floor Maas. Played by Stefan de Walle
- Docteur Semmelweis (1995), France/Poland, director: Roger Andrieux. Played by Philippe Volter
- Semmelweis (2001 short film), US/Austria, Belvedere Film, director: Jim Berry, producers: Robert Dassanowsky and Elfi von Dassanowsky. Played by Fritz Michel
- Semmelweis (2023) Film Positive Productions (Budapest, Hungary), director: Lajos Koltai

=== Literature ===
- Semmelweis, Ignác; von Györy, Tiberius (1905), Semmelweis's Gesammelte Werke Herausgegeben und zum Theil aus dem Ungarischen Übersetzt [The complete published works of Semmelweis, in part published from Hungarian] (in German), Jena Verlag von Gustav Fischer, p. 604 is the classic reference, in Latin print, not the original Gothic print.
- Louis-Ferdinand Céline completed his M.D. thesis on Semmelweis in 1924. It was published as a fictionalized biography under the title La Vie et l'œuvre de Philippe Ignace Semmelweis in 1936 (English versions: The Life and Work of Semmelweis, tr. by Robert Allerton Parker, Boston : Little, Brown and Company, 1937; Semmelweis, tr. by John Harman, Atlas Press, 2008).
- In William Forstchen's The Lost Regiment series of novels, one of the main characters is a doctor named Emil Weiss, the regiment's surgeon. On multiple occasions, it is mentioned that he had studied under Semmelweis and as such had developed effective sanitation techniques to avoid infection when treating injuries.
- Morton Thompson's 1949 novel The Cry and the Covenant is a fictionalized account based on the life of Semmelweis.
- Motherkillers, a novel by John Piper, based on the Semmelweis story.
- Genius Belabored: Childbed Fever and the Tragic Life of Ignaz Semmelweis, by Theodore G. Obenchain.
- Semmelweis Ignác rövid boldogsága [The Brief Happiness of Ignaz Semmelweis], a 2022 novel by Péter Gárdos, a fictionalized account of the life of Semmelweis.

=== Drama/plays ===
- An Enemy of the People, drama by Henrik Ibsen. The protagonist, a doctor battling both microbes and societal rejection, is at least loosely modeled on Semmelweis. (See Thomas Szasz, Liberation by Oppression: A Comparative Study of Slavery and Psychiatry, Transaction Publishers, New Brunswick & London, p. 176.)
- Semmelweis, opera-theater work by Raymond J. Lustig (music) and Matthew Doherty (libretto). Premiere production June 2018 in Miskolc, Hungary, directed by Martin Boross, featuring Szilveszter Szabó, Veronika Nádasi, and the Bela Bartok Chamber Choir of Szolnok, co-produced by Budapest Operetta Theater and Bartok Plusz Opera Festival. Nine additional Hungarian-language performances in Budapest, and a five-city tour throughout Hungary, 2018–19.
- Semmelweis by Jens Bjørneboe. Performed in 1977 at the Studio Arena Theater in Buffalo, New York with Lewis J. Stadlen, Kathy Bates, and Kim Hunter. Performed in 1978 at the Kennedy Center in Washington, D.C., with Colin Blakeley. Performed in 1981 at the Hartman Theater in Stamford, Connecticut.
- What are you fighting for, Dr Semmelweis by Titus Alexander, 1968. Performed July 1969 at the Church Hill Theatre, Edinburgh, Scotland, by pupils of the Edinburgh Rudolf Steiner School Dramatic Society, with Simon Scott as Semmelweis with music composed by Mark Edwards. Translated into German as Um was kämpfen Sie, Dr. Semmelweis? by Concilia Viegener and performed by a Steiner school in Brazil.
- Semmelweis by Peter Russell. A 90-minute play broadcast 9 August 1971 on BBC Radio 4 featuring Sandor Eles in the title role.
- Dr Semmelweis a new play by Stephen Brown with Mark Rylance. Delayed by the COVID-19 pandemic and opening at the Bristol Old Vic in January 2022. A West End run of Dr Semmelweis opened at the Harold Pinter Theatre in June 2023, again to critical acclaim, with Mark Rylance in the title role.

== See also ==
- Claude Pouteau
- Carl Mayrhofer
- Museum of Health Care
- Semmelweis Frauen-Klinik
- Semmelweis effect
