= Franz Breit =

Austrian obstetrician

Franz Breit (1 July 1817, in Mieders – 17 August 1868, in Tübingen) was an Austrian obstetrician.

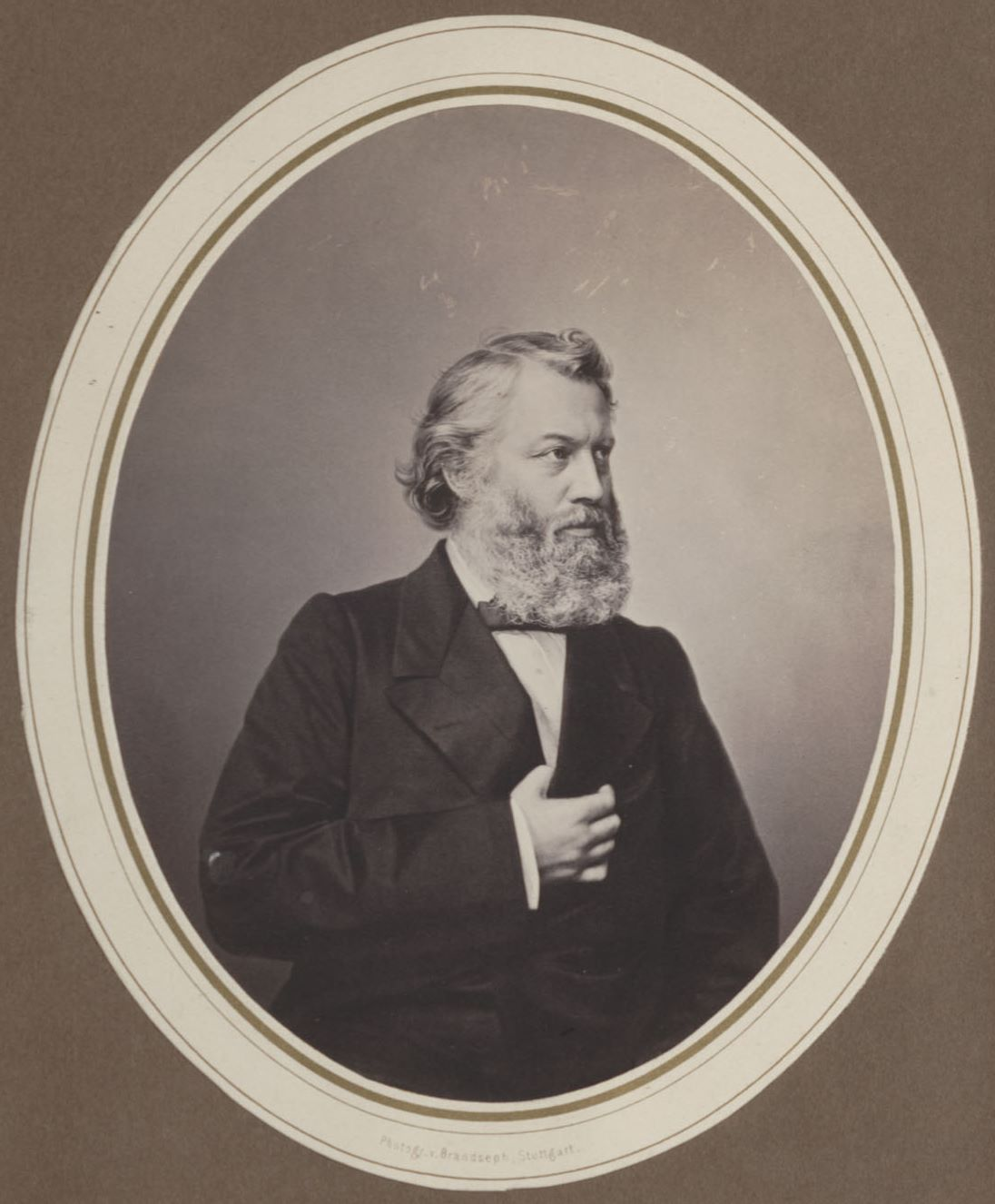
Franz Breit

He studied medicine in Vienna, Prague and Padua, and was later an obstetrician and assistant to professor Johann Klein of the maternity clinic at the Vienna General Hospital in Austria. He was appointed to professor and chair of obstetrics at the University of Tübingen on 20 March 1847 allowing Ignaz Semmelweis to become assistant to the professor. Franz Breit succeeded Eduard Lumpe as assistant to professor Klein.

Among his written works were three obstetrical treatises published in Roser and Wunderlich's Archiv für physiologische Heilkunde. In 1854 he published Über die Krankheiten der Symphysis ossium pubis wahrend Schwangerschaft, Geburt und Wochenbett (On the diseases of the symphysis pubis ossium during pregnancy, childbirth and the puerperium).
