= Etiology, Concept and Prophylaxis of Childbed Fever =

1861 pioneering medical book written by Ignaz Semmelweis

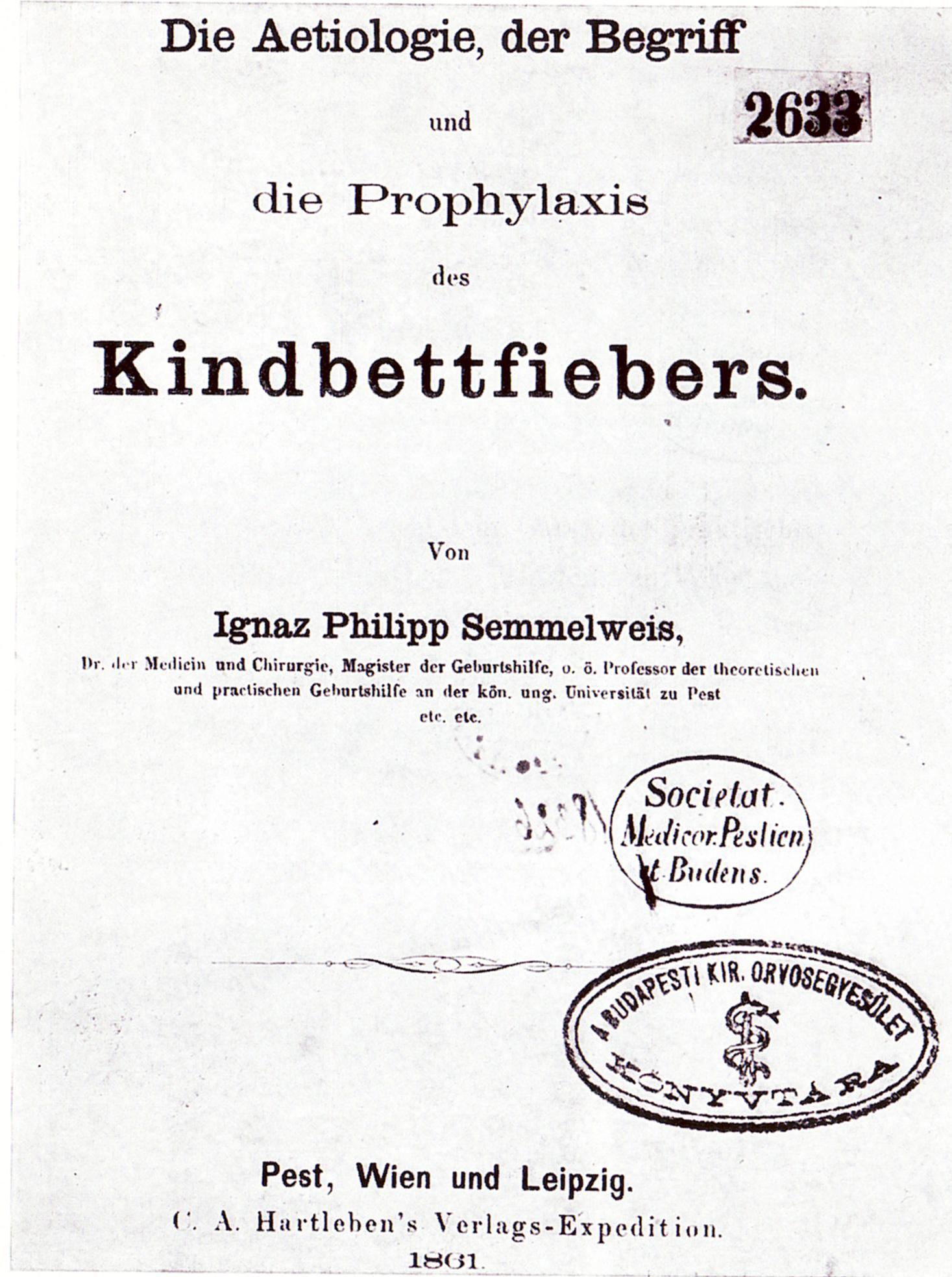
- Front page of the first edition
- Author: Ignaz Semmelweis
- Original title: Die Aetiologie, der Begriff und die Prophylaxis des Kindbettfiebers
- Language: German
- Publisher: C. A. Hartleben's Verlag-Expedition
- Publication date: 1861
- Publication place: Austrian Empire
- Pages: 524

Etiology, Concept and Prophylaxis of Childbed Fever (German: Die Ätiologie, der Begriff und die Prophylaxis des Kindbettfiebers) is a pioneering medical book written by Ignaz Semmelweis and published in 1861, which explains how hygiene in hospitals can drastically reduce unnecessary deaths. The book and concept saved millions of mothers from a preventable streptococcal infection.

The book is 524 pages long and includes studies in hospitals conducted in Vienna in 1847. It is claimed to be one of the most comprehensive medical studies ever published. It was translated into English in 1983 by Dr. K. Codell Carter.

Semmelweis's findings challenged conventional ideas about the incidence of puerperal fever (also known as postpartum infections or childbed fever), finding that it could be drastically reduced by requiring hand disinfection in obstetrical clinics. He also cites bed hygiene by washing linens after each patient.

Puerperal fever was a deadly infection, common in mid-19th-century hospitals. Semmelweis proposed the practice of washing hands with chlorinated lime solutions in 1847 while working in Vienna General Hospital's First Obstetrical Clinic, where doctors' wards had three times the mortality of midwives' wards.

Semmelweis had his life ruined at the time of publication because his ideas, though now proved and trusted, seemed impossible. The book contains a 100-page section purely dedicated to disproving many of the claims his critics had made about his research and ideas. Due to said critique, Semmelweis's personal life fell apart, leading to behavioral issues and his eventual death.

Despite this, in today's world Semmelweis is described as the "saviour of mothers."
