= Carl Braun (obstetrician) =

Austrian obstetrician

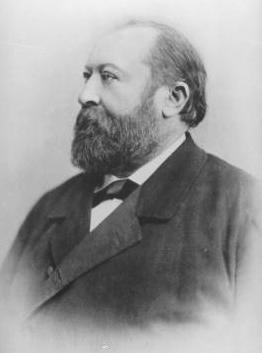
- Carl Ritter von Fernwald Braun, approx 1880
- Born: 22 March 1822; Zistersdorf, Niederösterreich, Austria
- Died: 28 March 1891 (aged 69); Wien, Cisleithania, Austro-Hungary
- Scientific career
- Fields: Obstetrics
- Workplaces: Vienna General Hospital

Carl Braun (22 March 1822 – 28 March 1891), sometimes Carl Rudolf Braun alternative spelling: Karl Braun, or Karl von Braun-Fernwald, name after knighthood Carl Ritter von Fernwald Braun was an Austrian obstetrician. He was born 22 March 1822 in Zistersdorf, Austria, son of the medical doctor Carl August Braun.

== Career ==
Carl Braun studied in Vienna from 1841 and, in 1847, took the position of Sekundararzt (assistant doctor) in the Vienna General Hospital. In 1849 he succeeded Ignaz Semmelweis as assistant to professor Johann Klein at the hospital's first maternity clinic, a position he held until 1853.

In 1853, after Braun became a Privatdozent, he was appointed ordinary professor of obstetrics in Trient and vice-director of the Tiroler Landes-Gebär- und Findelanstalt. In November 1856 he was called to Vienna to succeed Johann Klein as professor of obstetrics. On Braun's recommendation, the hospital's first gynaecology clinic was created in 1858, under his direction. He is credited for establishing gynaecology as an independent field of study.

In 1867–1871 he was appointed dean of the medical faculty, and in the academic year 1868/69 was made rector of the University of Vienna. He was knighted in 1872 (cf. the title Ritter) and in 1877 became a Hofrat, a title reserved for very eminent professors.

His name is associated with a disorder of pregnancy called the "Braun-Fernwald sign". This sign is described as an asymmetrical enlargement and softening of the uterine fundus at the site of implantation at 4–5 weeks.

== Views on puerperal fever ==
In full harmony with his contemporaries, Braun identified 30 causes of childbed fever opposing Ignaz Semmelweis's thesis that 'cadaverous poisoning' was the only cause of childbed fever. Despite this scholar opposition, Braun maintained a relatively low mortality rate in the First Division, roughly consistent with the rate Semmelweis himself achieved, as historical mortality rates of puerperal fever in the period April 1849 to end 1953 show. These results suggest that Braun continued, assiduously, to require hand disinfection before attending women and did not let mortality return to the high levels before Semmelweis introduced the chlorine washings.

== Works ==
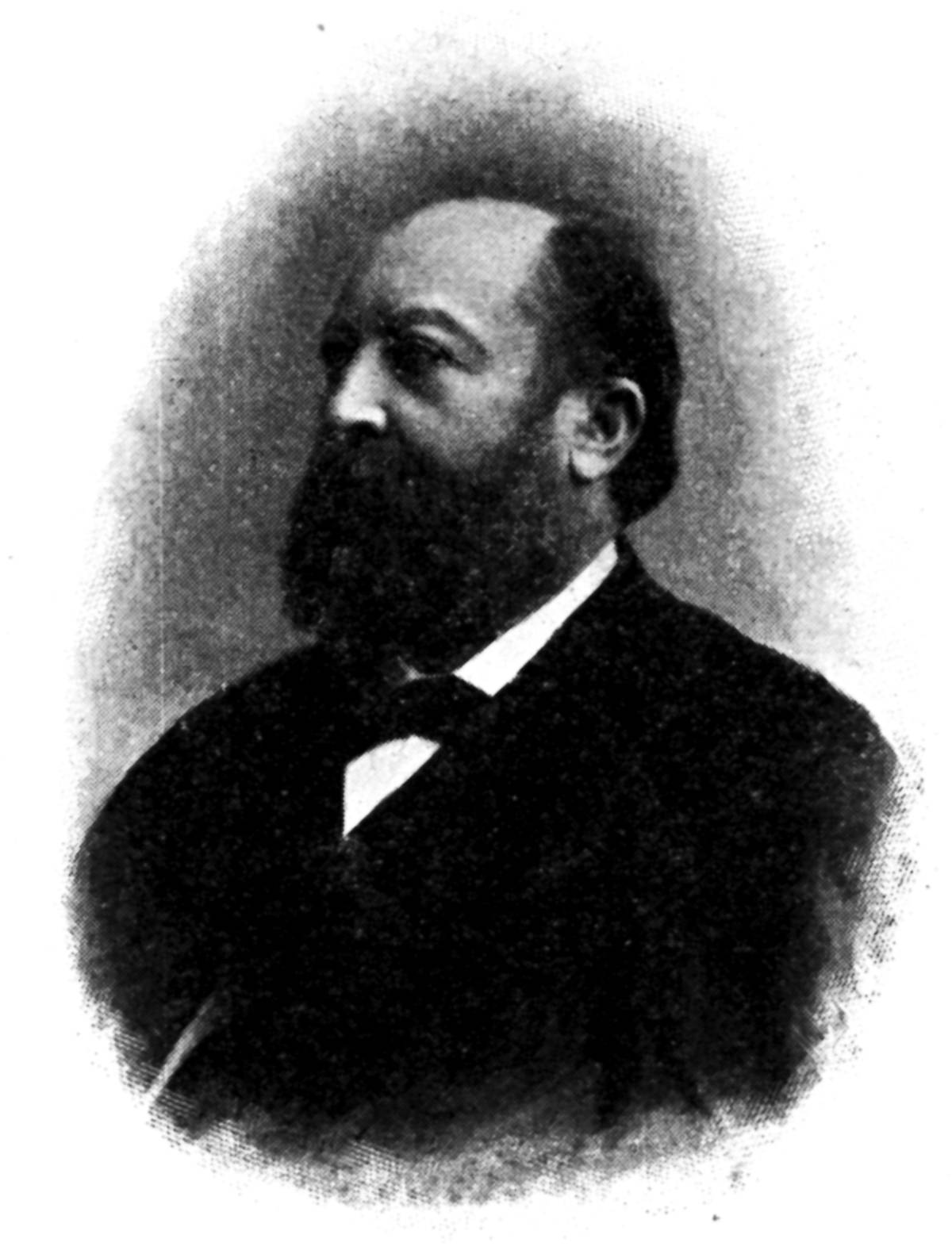
Photo from biography

- Klinik der Geburtshilfe und Gynäkologie (im Verein mit Chiari und Spaeth, Erlangen 1855) ([The] Maternity and Gynaecology Clinik, together with Chiari and Spaeth, Erlangen 1855)
- Lehrbuch der Geburtshilfe mit Berücksichtigung der Puerperalprocesse und der Operationstechnik (Wien 1857) (Textbook of obstetrics [also] concerning the puerperal process and surgical technique). Google book search https://books.google.com/books?id=3OOCGAAACAAJ
- Lehrbuch der gesammten Gynäkologie (2. Aufl., Ib. 1881) (Textbook of Gynaecology, 2nd ed. 1881). WorldCat entry: http://www.worldcat.org/oclc/8179918
- Über 12 Fälle von Kaiserschnitt und Hysterectomie bei engem Becken (mit achtmaligem günstigem Ausgang) (On 12 cases of caesarean section and hysterectomy with narrow pelvis (with eight successful outcomes))
