= Johann Klein =

Johann Klein (25 March 1788 – 11 April 1856) was professor of obstetrics at the University of Salzburg and at the University of Vienna. Johann Baptist Chiari was his son-in-law. In Vienna, he was succeeded by professor Carl Braun in 1856.

In the maternity clinic at the Vienna General Hospital there was a position as assistant to professor Klein. The position was held by:

- Eduard Lumpe
- Franz Breit, 1843?–1847 (except 1 July 1846 – 20 October 1846, when Semmelweis was Assistent)
- Ignaz Semmelweis, 1847–1849
- Carl Braun, 1849–1853

It was normal to grant the Assistent a two-year extension; indeed both Breit and Braun were granted extensions, Semmelweis was not however. Klein seems to have felt threatened by the younger members of the faculty, and he opposed both Semmelweis and his theories, specifically, Klein advocated the idea that physicians' hands could not transmit disease to their patients.
