= Pyaemia =

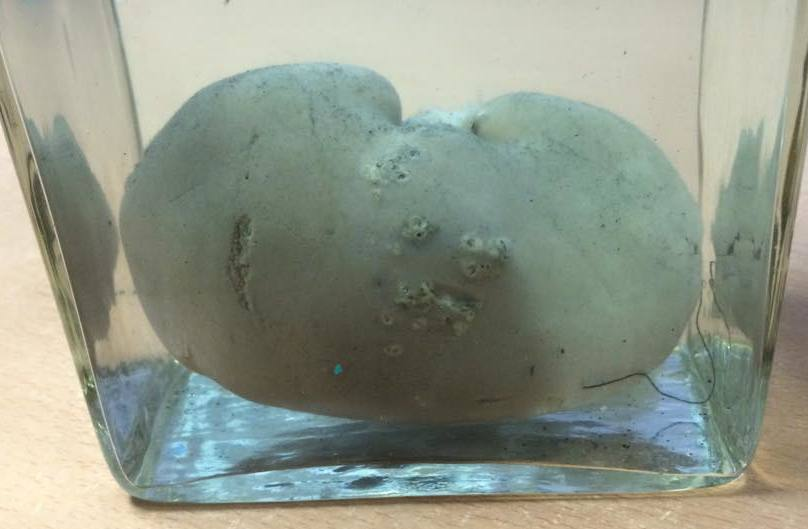
- Pyemic abscesses of kidney

Pyaemia (or pyemia) is a type of sepsis that leads to widespread abscesses of a metastatic nature. It is usually caused by the pus-forming organisms in the blood. Apart from the distinctive abscesses, pyaemia exhibits the same symptoms as other forms of septicaemia. It was almost universally fatal before the introduction of antibiotics.

Sir William Osler included a three-page discussion of pyaemia in his textbook The Principles and Practice of Medicine, published in 1892. He defined pyaemia as follows:

A general disease, characterized by recurring chills and intermittent fever and the formation of abscesses in various parts, all of which result from the contamination of the blood by products arising from a focus contaminated by the bacteria of suppuration.

Earlier still, Ignaz Semmelweis – who later died of the disease – included a section titled "Childbed fever is a variety of pyaemia" in his treatise, The Etiology of Childbed Fever (1861). Jane Grey Swisshelm, in her autobiography titled Half a Century, describes the treatment of pyaemia in 1862 during the American Civil War.

== Types ==
- arterial p. Pyaemia resulting from dissemination of emboli from a thrombus in cardiac vessels.
- cryptogenic p. Pyaemia of an origin that is hidden in the deeper tissues.
- metastatic p. Multiple abscesses resulting from infected pyaemic thrombi.
- portal p. Suppurative inflammation of the portal vein.

== Symptoms ==
The disease is characterized by intermittent high temperature with recurrent chills; metastatic processes in various parts of the body, especially in the lungs; septic pneumonia; empyema. It may be fatal. Clinical sign and symptoms can be differ according to system it involves.

== Diagnosis ==
features of systemic inflammatory response syndrome tachycardia >90beats/min tachypnea >24/min temperature >38 or <36

== Treatment ==
Antibiotics are effective. Prophylactic treatment consists in prevention of suppuration.

== Cultural references ==
- Ignaz Semmelweis, the original proponent of hand-washing in the practice of medicine, was widely scorned for his belief and was committed to an insane asylum where he died at age 47 of pyaemia, after being beaten by the guards, only 14 days after he was committed.
- The nihilistic character Bazarov in Ivan Turgenev's Fathers and Sons dies of pyaemia.
- Miller Huggins, manager of the New York Yankees, died of pyaemia while managing the team during the 1929 season.
- Blind Boy Fuller died at his home in Durham, North Carolina on February 13, 1941, at 5 p.m. of pyemia due to an infected bladder, gastrointestinal tract and perineum, plus kidney failure.
- Casper, a wounded soldier in Nostalgia, by Dennis McFarland, is dying of pyemia after his lower arm is amputated.
