= Contemporary reaction to Ignaz Semmelweis =

Reactions to Semmelweis' discovery for reducing childbed fever

Ignaz Semmelweis discovered in 1847 that hand-wash with a solution of chlorinated lime reduced the incidence of fatal childbed fever tenfold in maternity institutions. However, the contemporary reaction to Ignaz Semmelweis was not positive; his subsequent mental disintegration led to him being confined to an insane asylum, where he died in 1865.

Semmelweis's critics claimed his findings lacked scientific reasoning. The failure of the nineteenth-century scientific community to recognize Semmelweis's findings, and the nature of the flawed critiques outlined below, spurred support for fringe philosophies of epistemology such as positivism (despite many of his critics being themselves positivists who have demonstrated its flaws).

== Absorption of cadaveric material ==
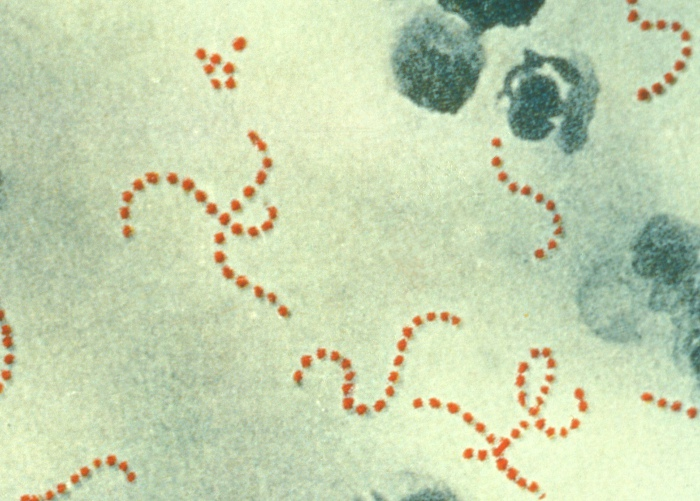
Streptococcus pyogenes (red-stained spheres) is responsible for most cases of severe puerperal fever. It is commonly found in the throat and nasopharynx of otherwise healthy carriers.

Semmelweis's key claim was that physicians contaminated their hands with "cadaveric particles" in the morgue while conducting autopsies. He pointed out that ordinary washings with soap did not remove these particles, because the hands could retain a stench for several days in spite of such washings. When physicians later carried out gynaecological examinations, the cadaveric particles were absorbed by the patient, in particular if they came into contact with the freshly exposed uterus, or with genital tract lesions caused by the birth process. Semmelweis was convinced that every case of childbed fever was caused by resorption of cadaveric particles. With this etiology, Semmelweis identified childbed fever as purely an iatrogenic disease—that is, one caused by doctors. (Friedrich Wilhelm Scanzoni von Lichtenfels took personal offense at this, and never forgave Semmelweis for it—Scanzoni remained one of the most ardent critics of Semmelweis.)

A few childbed fever case stories, described below, did not fit well into Semmelweis's theory and led him to expand it, also to comprise other types of decaying organic matter, for instance secretions from an infected knee or from a cancer tumor.

In a case of discharging cancer of the innermost part of the uterus, Semmelweis wrote:

In October 1847, a patient was admitted with discharging medullary carcinoma [cancer of the innermost part] of the uterus. She was assigned the bed at which the rounds were always initiated. After examining this patient, those conducting the examination washed their hands with soap only. The consequence was that of twelve patients then delivering, eleven died. The ichor from the discharging medullary carcinoma was not destroyed by soap and water. … Thus, childbed fever is caused not only by cadaverous particles adhering to hands but also by ichor from living organisms.

And in a case of a discharging carious knee, he wrote:

A new tragic experience persuaded me that air could also carry decaying organic matter. In November of the same year, an individual was admitted with a discharging carious left knee. […] the ichorous exhalations of the carious knee completely saturated the air of her ward. In this way the other patients were exposed and nearly all the patients in that room died. […] The ichorous particles that saturated the air of the maternity ward penetrated the uteruses already lacerated in the birth process. The particles were resorbed, and childbed fever resulted.

Even with the most meticulous chlorine-washings there seemed to be an unavoidable mortality rate of about 1 percent. He therefore suggested that self-infection took place - that internally generated cadaveric particles were responsible, for instance tissue crushed in the birth process and eventually turning gangrenous.

Most of the objections from Semmelweis's critics stemmed from his claim that every case of childbed fever was caused by resorption of cadaveric particles. Some of Semmelweis's first critics even responded that he had said nothing new - it had long been known that cadaveric contamination could cause childbed fever. But this was only one of many possible causes for childbed fever. The findings from autopsies of deceased women also showed a confusing multitude of various symptoms, which emphasised the assumption that puerperal fever was not one disease, but rather many different diseases, which remained unidentified. Semmelweis's critics were also quick to point out that he had virtually no evidence for his self-infection theory.

== Impact of Professor Levy's criticism ==
Carl Edvard Marius Levy's paper was first published in 1848, in a Danish journal. A translation was published in Germany by Gustav Adolf Michaelis in 1850. The actual impact on the medical community of the criticism is unclear. Semmelweis only learned of the essay in 1858 but evidently found it significant enough to address it thoroughly in his 1861 publication. The purpose of quoting the Levy paper was that it demonstrated the nature of the criticism, in particular the intricate theoretical reasoning that completely overshadowed Semmelweis' experimental results.

== Semmelweis's misconception of childbed fever ==
Today it is well known that Semmelweis was wrong about the theory of cadaveric contamination. What Semmelweis did not know is that chlorinated lime not only destroys the stench on contaminated hands, but also the bacteria there—the germ theory of disease had yet to be developed. Many of the epidemics of childbed fever were probably caused by streptococcus infections—either type A, which is commonly found in the throat and nasopharynx of otherwise healthy carriers, or type B, which lives on the skin. Type B is also found in the genitals of about 5–30% of pregnant women. It is therefore necessary for the physician to disinfect their hands before every examination and not, as Semmelweis thought, only after visits to the morgue.

== See also ==
- Carl Braun (obstetrician)
- Germ theory denialism
- Historical mortality rates of puerperal fever
- History of science
