= Carl Edvard Marius Levy =

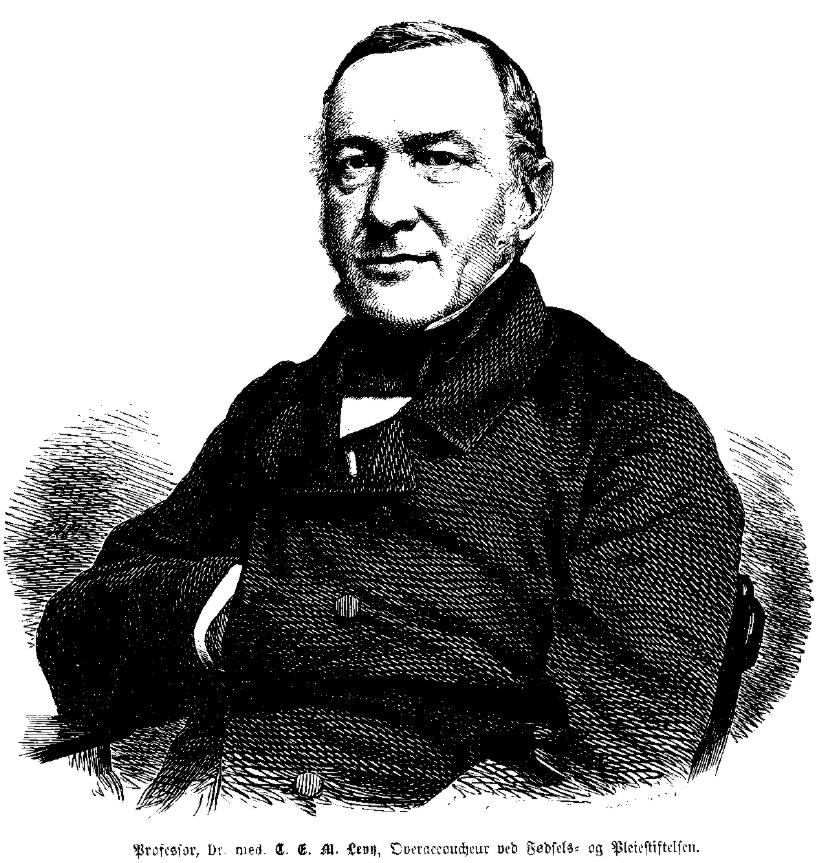
- Carl Edvard Marius Levy
- Born: 10 September 1808; København (Copenhagen), Danmark
- Died: 30 December 1865 (aged 57); København (Copenhagen), Danmark
- Scientific career
- Fields: Obstetrics, Pediatrics

Carl Edvard Marius Levy (10 September 1808 – 30 December 1865) was professor and head of the Danish Maternity institution in Copenhagen (Fødsels- og Plejestiftelsen). His name is sometimes spelled "Carl Eduard Marius Levy" or, in foreign literature, "Karl Edouard Marius Levy".

Levy graduated 1831 from Copenhagen University in Medicine and surgery. Received the university gold medal in 1830. Licentiat (PhD) degree in 1832. Doctorate degree in 1833. He then embarked on a three-year scientific journey which took him to France, Italy and England. Professor extraordinarius in obstetrics in 1841, professor ordinarius in 1850.

He founded the monthly medical journal: Hospitals-Meddelelser. He also founded the Doctor's Association Den Almindelige Danske Lægeforening in 1857, which he headed until 1859. He suffered and would die from a heart defect.

He was born Jewish but converted to Christianity in 1840-1841 in order to pursue an academic career.

According to his biography, rampant epidemics of childbed fever at the Copenhagen maternity institution tested his ingenuity and determination. Repeated closures of the institution and the creation of interim locales proved fruitless. After a study tour to England and Ireland in 1846 he completely rebuilt and reformed the maternity institution, however with unsatisfactory results.

Professor Carl Braun in Vienna said about the Copenhagen hospital, that "because this is the most appropriate and noteworthy newly constructed maternity hospital, in which every step has been taken to halt puerperal fever epidemics, we allow ourselves to estimate that in this new building under Levy's direction no puerperal fever epidemics will occur."

Professor Levy was an outspoken critic of Ignaz Semmelweis' ideas, that childbed fever was an iatrogenic disease. Semmelweis theorized that decaying matter on the hands of doctors, who had recently conducted autopsies, was brought into contact with the genitals of women giving birth during the medical examinations at the maternity clinic. Semmelweis proposed a radical hand washing theory using chlorinated lime, now a known disinfectant, and demonstrated dramatic reductions in mortality rates. In a rather infamous concluding remark, Professor Levy writes:

These are my impressions of Dr. Semmelweis's experiences; for these reasons I must judge provisionally that his opinions are not clear enough and his findings not exact enough to qualify as scientifically founded.

The above translation is rather benign compared to the punch in the original Danish quote. For more of his criticism, see Semmelweis' ideas rejected as unscientific.

== See also ==
- Two-page obituary published in Illustreret Tidende, Årgang 7, Nr. 328, 07/01-1866 from which the picture is sourced. "Professor Dr. med. Levy". Illustreret Tidende. 7 (328): 125–126. 7 January 1866.. Pdf versions of pages available here, and here
- Entry in the Danish biography (1887–1905) Dansk biografisk lexikon (in Danish). Available online. Levy's biography is in Volume X, page 255 and onwards, see here and onwards.
