= Lichtenfels =

Lichtenfels may refer to:

== Places ==
- Lichtenfels, Hesse in Germany
- Lichtenfels, Bavaria in Germany
  - Lichtenfels station
  - 1. FC Lichtenfels, a German association football club
- Lichtenfels (district) in Bavaria
- Lichtenfels, Greenland, a former settlement

== People with the surname ==
- Friedrich-Karl Freiherr von Dalwigk zu Lichtenfels (1907–1940), German Major in the Luftwaffe during World War II
- Julius Lichtenfels (1884–1968), German fencer
- Eduard Peithner von Lichtenfels (1833–1913), Austrian painter
- Friedrich Wilhelm Scanzoni von Lichtenfels (1821–1891), German gynecologist and obstetrician
- Gustav Scanzoni von Lichtenfels (lawyer) (1885-1977), grandson of Friedrich Wilhelm Scanzoni von Lichtenfels
- Gustav Scanzoni von Lichtenfels (1855–1924), German general of World War I

== Ships ==
- SS Lichtenfels (1929), a heavy lift ship, built for the DDG Hansa shipping company
