= Penis captivus =

Supposed rare occurrence during sex

Penis captivus is an occurrence during human sexual intercourse when the muscles in the vagina clamp down on the penis much more firmly than usual, making it impossible for the penis to be withdrawn from the vagina. According to a 1979 article in the British Medical Journal, this condition was unknown in the twentieth century, but a subsequent letter to the same journal reported an apparent case of penis captivus in 1947. Penis captivus should not be confused with vaginismus, though a relation between the supposed event of penis captivus and the occurrence of vaginismus is assumed in the existing descriptions.

== Reported cases ==
In an article published in the British Medical Journal in 1979, Dr F. Kräupl Taylor reviewed the literature on penis captivus and concluded that while "almost all the cases mentioned in medical publications and in textbooks are based on hearsay and rumour", two papers published by nineteenth-century German gynaecologists – Scanzoni (1870) and Hildebrandt (1872) – who had personally dealt with cases of the condition "leave no doubt about the reality of this unusual symptom", which, however, "is so rare that it is often regarded nowadays as no more than a prurient myth". Scanzoni's patient was "a completely healthy young woman, married for six months". She and her husband had to abstain from sexual intercourse because her intense vaginal contractions were "most painful to him and ... did on several occasions end in a spasm ... which sometimes lasted more than ten minutes and made it impossible for the couple to separate". Hildebrandt's patient had been married for about a year. Sexual intercourse with her husband had always been painless until one particular evening. Hildebrandt gives the husband's account of what happened:

He reported that just at the moment when he thought intercourse, which had been quite normal till then, had come to an end, he suddenly felt that he, or rather his glans, was held back deep in the vagina, tightly gripped and imprisoned, while his whole penis was in the vagina. All attempts at withdrawal failed. When he forced the attempts, he caused severe pain to himself and his wife. Bathed in perspiration through agitation, alarm and his failure to free himself, he was finally forced to resign himself to waiting in patience. He could not say how many minutes this lasted, his imprisonment seemed endless. Then — the hindrance vanished on its own; he was free.

Finding no later reports that were properly authenticated, Kräupl Taylor was of the opinion that the symptom "does not seem to have occurred in the past 100 years or so. If there had been, during that time, a case of penis captivus that needed medical intervention or admission to hospital it would have been eagerly reported in a medical journal with as much detail and evidence as possible."

In a letter published in the British Medical Journal in 1980 in response to Kräupl Taylor's article, Dr Brendan Musgrave recalled that in 1947 when he was a houseman at the Royal Isle of Wight County Hospital he had seen a case of this seemingly rare condition. "I can distinctly remember the ambulance drawing up and two young people, a honeymoon couple I believe, being carried on a single stretcher into the casualty department. An anaesthetic was given to the female and they were discharged later the same morning." To check the veracity of his memory, Dr. Musgrave had rung his old friend Dr S.W. Wolfe, "who was the other houseman at the hospital at the time. He confirmed my story, his exact words being 'I remember it well.'"

In her memoir An Impossible Woman (1975), Graham Greene's friend dottoressa Elisabeth Moor recounts how she was once urgently called to the Hotel Eden-Paradiso in Anacapri, Italy. "And there I found a young German girl, in the bathtub in a pool of blood, who begged me to do what I could; I should help her as she was bleeding to death" from "a tear in the vagina". The girl had been having sex with a man and her vagina had clamped tightly around his swollen penis. In freeing his penis, the man had inflicted "a heavily bleeding tear. A very deep wound." He had then fled. After Dottoressa Moor had staunched the bleeding, she and a colleague she had summoned stitched the girl up. "She healed very well." Dottoressa Moor adds, "These cases are not as rare as you think." She mentions – though only as hearsay – "a much worse case" involving a Swiss girl that occurred in Lucerne, Switzerland, during the war and resulted in "dreadful injuries" when the man panicked: "they had got stuck inside each other. It needed two or three doctors to help to undo them."

== Hoax report ==
A report of the phenomenon in an 1884 article by one Egerton Yorrick Davis in the Philadelphia Medical News was later discovered to be a hoax perpetrated by Sir William Osler. Historians speculate that he was annoyed by an editorial published in the same journal by Dr. Theophilus Parvin, "An Uncommon Form of Vaginismus". Both men served on that respected journal's editorial board.

== See also ==
- Bulbus glandis – Male canine erectile tissue
- Priapism – Medical condition where an erection lasts excessively long
- Rectal foreign body – Large bodies found in the rectum in medical context
- Vaginismus – Involuntary muscle spasm that interferes with vaginal penetration
- Vagina dentata – Folk story and cautionary tale
