= Septic abortion =

Miscarriage due to uterine infection

Septic abortion is any type of abortion (intentional termination or miscarriage), due to an upper genital tract bacterial infection including the inflammation of the endometrium during or after 20 weeks of gestation. The genital tract during this period is particularly vulnerable to infection, and sepsis in most cases is caused by a combination of factors both due to facility conditions and/or individual predispositions. The infection often starts in the placenta and fetus, with a potential complication of also affecting the uterus, that can result in sepsis spreading to surrounding organs, or pelvic infections.

== Causes ==
By definition, septic abortion is caused by a variety of bacterial infections. Bacteria can come from vaginal and endocervical flora or can be transmitted sexually. The development of sepsis is primarily due to two scenarios. When there is an incomplete abortion caused by the pathogens that result in products of conception remaining in the body. The second scenario occurs intentional septic procedures leads to the spread of the infection from the placenta or fetus to the uterus; this can subsequently cause pelvic septicaemia. Possible pathogens include Neisseria gonorrhoeae, Chlamydia trachomatis, Escherichia coli, Mycoplasma hominis, Clostridium perfringens, Klebsiella and Proteus species, staphylococcal strains, and other gram-positive or gram-negative bacteria. In 2011, an analysis was done to determine if a pregnant woman should be screened for Group B Streptococcus which has been found to be a cause for many diseases including septic abortion. Within the large range of potential pathogens, in third world countries tetanus is the most common cause, while in the U.S. Clostridium perfringens is the most common cause especially in induced abortions. In situations where intentional abortion is performed illegally or in impoverished countries, there is a higher risk of septic complications because it is likely that the procedure was performed by non-professionals in unhygienic settings, making way for more exposure to infectious bacteria. Put in perspective, infection caused 62% of illegal abortion and 51% of miscarriages, however infection only caused 21% of deaths from legally performed septic abortions.

== Epidemiology ==
From 2015-2017, approximately 73.3 million abortions occurred worldwide each year. Furthermore, data from 2010-2014 showed that around 45% of these abortions were unsafe abortions, where 98% of these unsafe abortions occurred in developing countries. In particular, it was estimated that over 50% of the unsafe abortions occurred in Asia, with most in south and central Asia, and Africa. Global data from a 2008 systematic analysis also estimated that complications from unsafe abortions accounted for 13% of all maternal deaths. Furthermore, in a retrospective case study, it was found that maternal mortality associated with septic abortion was approximately 19%; however a systematic review of global data is still needed.

Septic abortion is of highest prevalence in vulnerable populations living in resource-poor environments, with prevalence reaching as high as 86% in these populations. Within such environments, the incidence of septic abortion is highest among teenagers, and in areas with restrictive abortion laws due to a higher utilization of illicit abortion procedures carried out by non-doctors due to the inherent barriers in obtaining abortion. Therefore, "societies with high fertility rate, low contraceptive usage, and legal obstacles to safe termination of pregnancy" predisposes the society to a higher prevalence of septic abortion.

Nevertheless, although the incidence of septic abortion is highest among teenagers between the ages of 16 and 24 years, which constitutes two-thirds of the population affected by septic abortion, septic complications are still common in older married people who are assigned female at birth. The epidemiology of septic abortion is therefore dictated by risk factors and barriers to safe abortion.

Especially considering the emergence of antibiotic resistant bacteria, septic abortions are of high concern for the medical community.

== Signs and symptoms ==
Signs and symptoms related to septic abortion are mainly:

- High fever, usually above 101 °F / 38 °C
- Chills
- Severe abdominal pain and/or cramping /or strong perineal pressure
- Beginning miscarriage symptoms (heavy bleeding and or cramping) that suddenly stops and does not resume
- Prolonged or heavy vaginal bleeding
- Foul-smelling vaginal discharge
- Backache or heavy back pressure

A cold or urinary tract infection may mimic many of the symptoms.

As the condition becomes more serious, signs of septic shock may appear, including:

- Low blood pressure (hypotension)
- Low body temperature (hypothermia)
- Little or no urine output (oliguria)
- Respiratory distress (dyspnea and labored breathing)

Septic shock may lead to kidney failure, bleeding diathesis, and disseminated intravascular coagulation (DIC). Intestinal organs may also become infected, potentially causing scar tissue with chronic pain, intestinal blockage, and infertility.

If the septic abortion is not treated quickly and effectively, the woman may die.

== Diagnosis ==
Septic abortion is diagnosed using clinical evaluation, bacterial cultures, and ultrasonography on people who present with signs and symptoms with intrauterine infections following by an abortion within 20 weeks of gestation. Medical history and physical examination are used as the first line in identifying people who are suspected of having a septic abortion. A woman may present initially with a fever, ill appearance, abdominal pain, vaginal bleeding, trauma to the cervix and other potentially worrisome symptoms of an infection. Differential diagnosis of a septic abortion includes incomplete abortion with a cause of fever or spontaneous abortion with signs of inflammation redness of the lining of the uterus.

=== Clinical evaluation and lab test ===
Clinical findings are based on any infections ranging in severity in any patient presenting with fevers over 38 °C or 100.4 °F with severe abdominal pain and peritonitis, and foul smelling vaginal discharge. A complete blood count (CBC) with differential should be done in people with a fever to assess the presence of leukocytosis and brandemic which are the infection markers. Labs such as electrolyte levels, glucose, blood urea nitrogen (BUN), creatinine, liver function test (LFT), antibody screening, lactate levels and coagulation studies such as prothrombin time (PT), activated partial thromboplastin time (aPTT) and fibrinogen should be looked at for any abnormalities especially with people with excessive bleeding.

=== Microbiology ===
In individuals who are suspected to have a septic abortion, there are a few variations of cultures that are taken for further diagnostic and treatment implications. Anaerobic bacterial, high vaginal, and cervical cultures can be used to identify the septic types and species of the offending microorganism. Primary organisms isolated are the non-clostridial anaerobic, microaerophilic bacteria, anaerobic streptococci. Group A of Beta haemolytic streptococci is the most pathogenic and is usually introduced into the genital tract externally as they are not normally found in the normal vaginal flora. Groups B and D are less virulent but it is also not found as the part of vaginal flora.

Table 1: pathogenic organisms in Septic Abortion

Anaerobic	Aerobic
Bacteroides fragilis Bacteroides melaninogenicus Peptostreptococcus species Peptococcus species Fusobacterium species Clostridium perfringens Clostridium tetani	Escherichia coli Enterobacter species Beta haemolytic streptococci Proteus species Klebsiella aerogenes Pseudomonas aeruginosa Neisseria gonorrhoeae Staphylococcus aureus Streptococcus milleri

=== Ultrasonography and other Imaging Techniques ===
Ultrasonography, also known as "ultrasound", is often used following a clinical diagnosis to confirmed the specific location and the origin of a septic abortion. Computed tomography (CT) or magnetic resonance imaging (MRI) may be also used. Findings of a septic abortion include:

- An enlarged uterus with or without hemorrhage
- Intrauterine materials
- Free or unexpected fluid
- Formation of abscess
- Intrauterine air

== Risk factors ==
The risk of post-abortion sepsis is increased by mainly the following factors:

- The fetal membranes surrounding the fetus have ruptured, sometimes without being detected
- The woman has a sexually transmitted infection such as chlamydia
- An intrauterine device (IUD) was left in place during the pregnancy
- Tissue from the fetus or placenta is left inside the uterus after a miscarriage or elective abortion procedure
- Insertion of tools, chemicals, or soaps into the uterus
- Undergoing septic abortion under illegal conditions (unsafe abortion)
- Undergoing septic abortion procedures in resource-poor areas (unsafe abortion)
- Incomplete septic abortion such as late uterine evacuation
- Delayed treatment

== Complications ==
These are some of the complications that may occur especially if treatment is delayed:

- Sepsis
- Septic pelvic thrombophlebitis
- Pelvic abscess (a build up of fluid in the fallopian tube, ovaries, or parametric tissue that is also infected with bacteria)
- Bacteraemia (a build up of bacteria in the blood stream)
- Disseminated intravascular coagulopathy
- Renal failure
- Septic shock (most often caused by Clostridium welchii and Clostridium perfringens)
- Death

== Treatment ==
The woman should have intravenous fluids to maintain blood pressure and urine output (oliguria or hypouresis are both names from roots meaning "not enough urine"; these terms refer to the low output of urine). Broad-spectrum intravenous antibiotics should be given until the fever is gone. There are different antibiotic regimens which are almost equal such as intravenous clindamycin, penicillin plus chloramphenicol, cephalothin plus kanamycin. And only one research found that tetracycline is more effective to decrease the time of fever than penicillin G. However, new studies are needed to establish the most effective antibiotic in septic abortion.

A dilatation and curettage (D&C) or misoprostol may be ultilized to clean the uterus of any residual tissue. Rh negative blood should be given to the woman in addition to an injection of Rh immune globulin, unless the father is also known to be Rh negative. The removal of the infected tissue is often one of the most effective treatments for septic abortion. In cases so severe that abscesses have formed in the ovaries and tubes, it may be necessary to remove the uterus by hysterectomy, and possibly other infected organs as well.

After successful treatment of a septic abortion, a woman may be tired for several weeks. In case of substantial bleeding, iron supplementation may be helpful. Sexual intercourse or the use of tampons should be avoided until recommended by the healthcare provider.

== Prevention ==
=== Primary prevention ===
Most complications and deaths associated with septic abortions can be prevented by reducing the chances of unwanted pregnancies through comprehensive sexual education and optimal use of effective contraceptions. Unwanted pregnancies can be avoided and reduced by improving social equality which would prevent women from coercive sexual relationships. A 2015 meta-analysis study showed that motivational interviewing on contraceptive use can increase the effective use of it immediately after interview and up to four months post-intervention. Another factor for preventing unsafe abortion is having access to safe, legal, and comprehensive abortion services. According to the World Health Organization (WHO), 22 million unsafe abortions occur each year globally. Studies have shown that women appear to have low knowledge on abortion regulations and laws in their countries. In other words, the lack of knowledge on legal status of abortion can cause women to seek abortion services that are unsafe. Systematic reviews have shown that education on legal situation of abortion services and knowledge on accessible safe services would reduce the chance of women seeking for unsafe options that would lead to complications such as septic abortions.

=== Secondary prevention ===
Secondary prevention of septic abortions can be achieved by early detection and treatment of inflammation of the lining of the uterus that could prevent more serious infections. Initial assessments of patient's history, and symptoms can be helpful in understanding the severity of the problem. Physical exams and pelvic exams as well as blood cultures should be used to determine the main reason behind the infection. It has been found that variety of bacteria can lead to infected abortions and no one antibiotic is preferred. Therefore, investigating blood cultures would be an important step to guide antibiotic therapy. Following up to date guidelines and well-studied treatment regimens is recommended.

=== Tertiary prevention ===
Tertiary prevention of septic abortion are approaches that minimize organ disability or death risk from the infection. If the infection is not eradicated and managed, it can lead to septic shock and acute respiratory distress syndrome (ARDS). In severe cases, women with high fever, pelvis peritonitis, and tachycardia should be hospitalized for a course of antibiotic and evacuation of the remaining pregnancy tissue. If there is no response from emptying of the uterus, the patient could be indicated for another procedure called laparotomy. finally, patients with severe sepsis may develop ARDS. In that case, blood oxygen saturation should be monitored and adequate ventilation has to start if the saturation level drops below optimal levels.
