= Scanzoni =

Scanzoni may refer to:

- Friedrich Wilhelm Scanzoni von Lichtenfels (1821–1891), a Bohemia-born German gynecologist and obstetrician
- Gustav Scanzoni von Lichtenfels (lawyer) (1885–1977), grandson of Friedrich Wilhelm Scanzoni von Lichtenfels
- Gustav Scanzoni von Lichtenfels (1855–1924), German general of World War I, active in Attack at Fromelles
- Letha Dawson Scanzoni (born 1935), an independent scholar, author, and editor
