= Hospitals-Meddelelser =

- Discipline: Medicine
- Language: Danish
- Edited by: Carl Edvard Marius Levy (1848-1856) and Søren Eskildsen Larsen (1848-1853)

Publication details
- History: 1848–1856
- Publisher: Superintendent of Copenhagen Hospitals (Denmark)
- Frequency: monthly

Standard abbreviations
- ISO 4: Hosp.-Meddelelser

Indexing
- OCLC no.: 50352611

Hospitals-Meddelelser (English: Hospital Communications) was a Danish medical journal founded by Carl Edvard Marius Levy and published from 1848 to 1856. Søren Eskildsen Larsen, the chief surgeon at Almindelig Hospital, was co-editor from 1848 to 1853.
