= Historical mortality rates of puerperal fever =

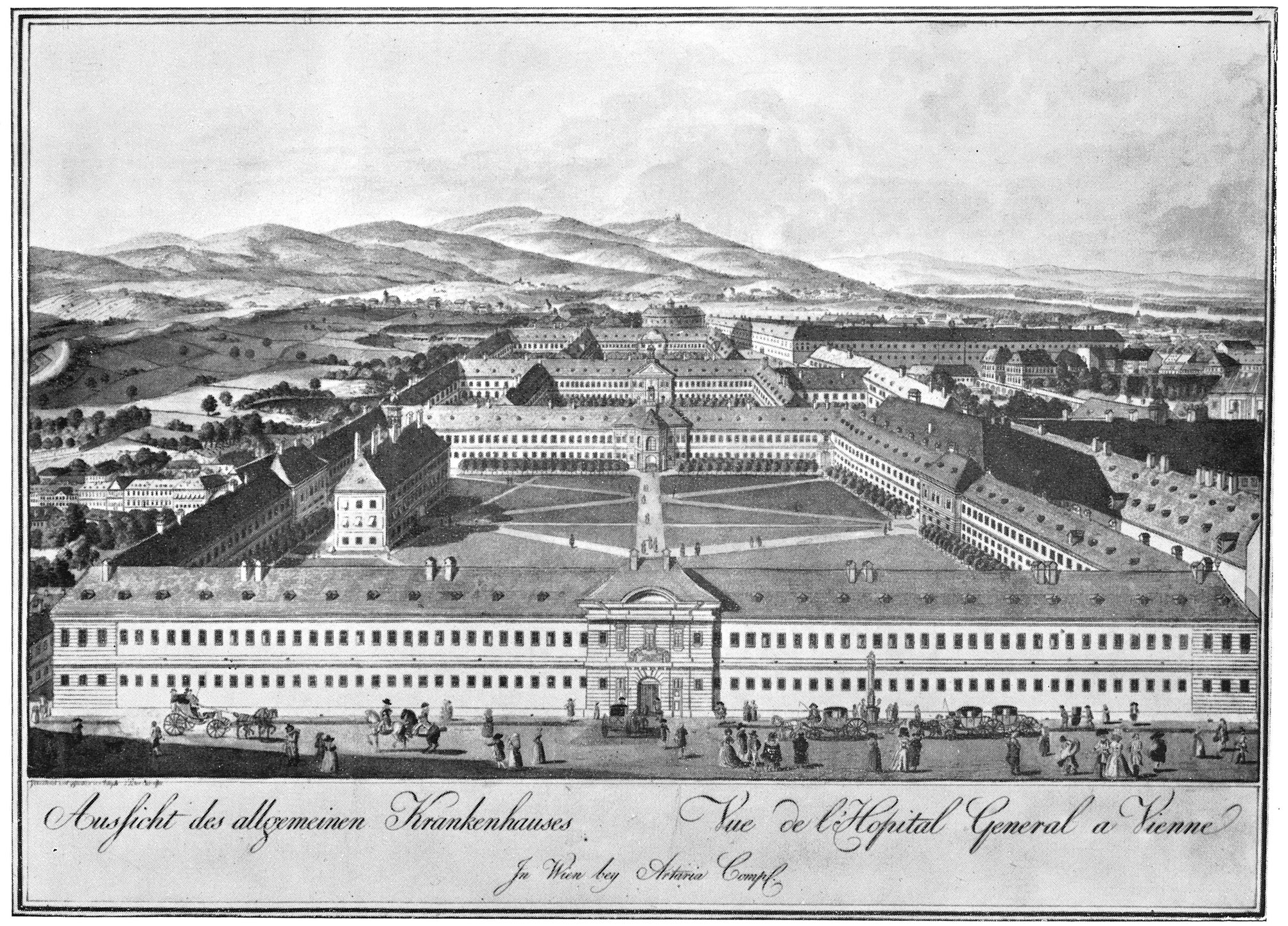
Vienna General Hospital in 1784. Semmelweis worked at the maternity clinic. Copper engraving by Josef & Peter Schafer

Historically, puerperal fever was a devastating disease. It affected women within the first three days after childbirth and progressed rapidly, causing acute symptoms of severe abdominal pain, fever and debility.

The most common infection causing puerperal fever is genital tract sepsis caused by contaminated medical equipment or unhygienic medical staff who contaminate the mother's genital tract during the delivery. Other types of infection that can lead to sepsis after childbirth include urinary tract infection, breast infection (mastitis) and respiratory tract infection (more common after anaesthesia due to lesions in the trachea). Puerperal fever is now rare in the West due to improved hygiene during delivery, and the few infections that do occur are usually treatable with antibiotics.

== The work of Dr. Ignaz Semmelweis ==
Dr. Ignaz Semmelweis worked at the Vienna General Hospital's maternity clinic on a 3-year contract from 1846–1849. There, as elsewhere in European and North American hospitals, puerperal fever, or childbed fever, was rampant, sometimes climbing to 40 percent of admitted patients. He was disturbed by these mortality rates, and eventually developed a theory of infection, in which he theorized that decaying matter on the hands of doctors, who had recently conducted autopsies, was brought into contact with the genitals of birthgiving women during the medical examinations at the maternity clinic. He proposed a radical hand washing theory using chlorinated lime, now a known disinfectant.

At the time however, the germ theory of infection had not been developed and Semmelweis' ideas ran contrary to key medical assumptions and practices. His ideas were rejected and ridiculed. Quite unusually, his contract was not renewed, effectively expelling him from the medical community in Vienna. He died as an outcast in a mental institution.

=== Puerperal fever – a modern disease ===
An 1841 account of epidemic childbed fever states that insofar as existing historical documents permit one to judge, childbed fever is a modern disease. The cases reported by Hippocrates that are generally identified as such are not puerperal fever. There are only examples of bilious fever, then common, which among maternity patients was no different from its appearance among non-maternity patients or men; Hippocrates himself never identified it as a separate and distinguishable disease.

=== Hospital Hôtel-Dieu de Paris ===
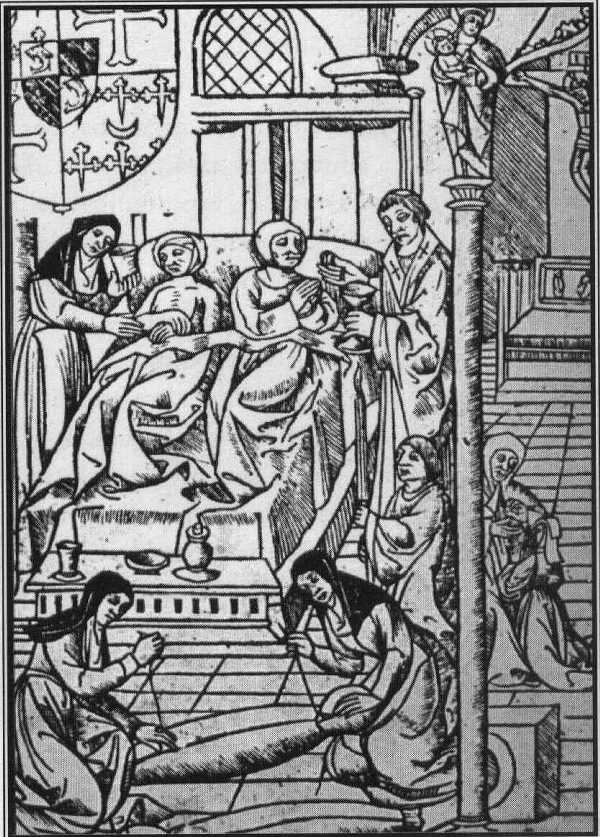
Hôtel Dieu in Paris, about ad 1500. The priest on the right is issuing the last sacraments, while a nun administers to the patient on the left. Patients often slept two, three and even four to a bed

We encounter the first, as yet unclear indication of childbed fever in the second half of the 17th century at the Hôtel-Dieu in Paris. Phillipe Peu relates that mortality among the newly delivered was very great and greater in certain seasons than others. The year 1664 was particularly devastating.

Another account states that the lower abdominal infection, la fièvre puerpérale, had raged every winter since 1774 among the maternity patients of the Hôtel-Dieu, and that often as many as 7 of every 12 patients suffered from it.

=== The maternity clinic at Würzburg ===
For the relatively small maternity clinic at Würzburg in Germany, Franz Kiwisch von Rotterau reported 27 deaths from 102 patients (26.5%) cared for during one year, much higher than the Viennese hospital. Semmelweis explained this from the need in small hospitals to use every patient as teaching material. In contrast, "in Vienna there is such an excess of teaching material that hundreds of individuals are not used for teaching and thus are not infected".

=== Inconsistencies in data ===
There are various inconsistencies in the datasets reported by Semmelweis and provided below. Inconsistencies exist for instance in reported yearly rates, and monthly rates (if aggregated to yearly basis). One of the causes may be that Semmelweis used different sources. He points out several times that actual mortality rates were higher than reported ones, because during childbed fever epidemics, the maternity ward was overwhelmed with dying women, who were then transferred to the general hospital, and therefore not registered at the maternity ward, when dying. Some women were also released from the maternity ward, either healthy or not so healthy, only to be readmitted to the general hospital when symptoms appeared or worsened. See also a similar underreporting practice at the Charité hospital in Berlin, Joseph Hermann Schmidt.

There were two maternity clinics at the Vienna General Hospital. Semmelweis is not always specific, if the numbers are for both clinics, or for his own clinic only. The figures presented below are exactly as reported in (the 1983 translation by Carter of) Semmelweis' 1861 publication.

There are also at times minor arithmetical errors in his computed rates; for this reason all rates on this page are computed.

== Mortality rates at the Vienna General Hospital ==
=== Monthly mortality rates for birthgiving women 1841–49 ===
The table below shows monthly incidence rates from 1841–1849, Semmelweis' handwashing policy was implemented from June 1847 to February 1849.

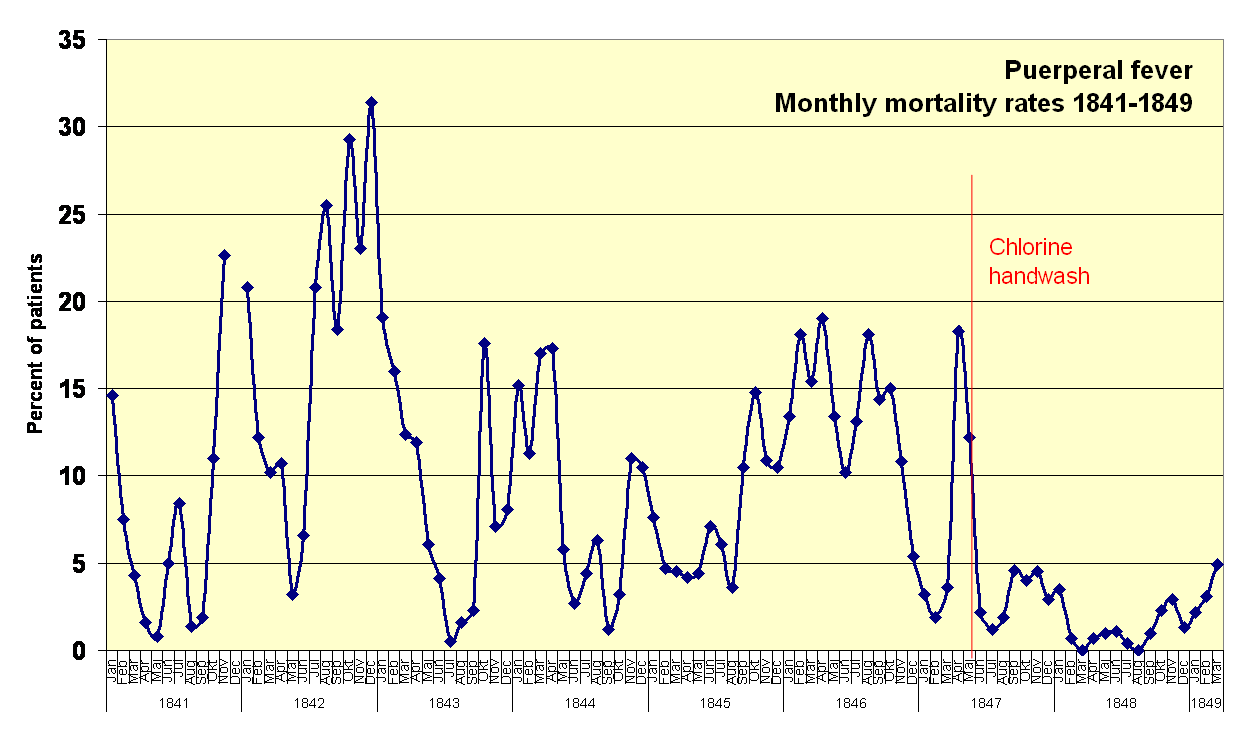
Puerperal fever monthly mortality rates at Vienna Maternity Institution 1841–1849. Rates drop when implementing handwash

Puerperal fever mortality rates for birthgiving women at the first clinic at the Vienna General Hospital 1841–1849 reported by Semmelweis.
Year	Month	Births	Deaths	Rate (%)	Notes
1841	January 1841	254	37	14.6	
	February 1841	239	18	7.5	
	March 1841	277	12	4.3	
	April 1841	255	4	1.6	
	May 1841	255	2	0.8	
	June 1841	200	10	5.0	
	July 1841	190	16	8.4	
	August 1841	222	3	1.4	
	September 1841	213	4	1.9	
	October 1841	236	26	11.0	
	November 1841	235	53	22.6	
	December 1841	na	na	na	
1842	January 1842	307	64	20.8	
	February 1842	311	38	12.2	
	March 1842	264	27	10.2	
	April 1842	242	26	10.7	
	May 1842	310	10	3.2	
	June 1842	273	18	6.6	
	July 1842	231	48	20.8	
	August 1842	216	55	25.5	
	September 1842	223	41	18.4	
	October 1842	242	71	29.3	
	November 1842	209	48	23.0	
	December 1842	239	75	31.4	
1843	January 1843	272	52	19.1	
	February 1843	263	42	16.0	
	Mar 1843	266	33	12.4	
	April 1843	285	34	11.9	
	May 1843	246	15	6.1	
	June 1843	196	8	4.1	
	July 1843	191	1	0.5	
	August 1843	193	3	1.6	
	September 1843	221	5	2.3	
	October 1843	250	44	17.6	
	November 1843	252	18	7.1	
	December 1843	236	19	8.1	
1844	January 1844	244	37	15.2	
	February 1844	257	29	11.3	
	March 1844	276	47	17.0	
	April 1844	208	36	17.3	
	May 1844	240	14	5.8	
	June 1844	224	6	2.7	
	July 1844	206	9	4.4	
	August 1844	269	17	6.3	
	September 1844	245	3	1.2	
	October 1844	248	8	3.2	
	November 1844	245	27	11.0	
	December 1844	256	27	10.5	
1845	January 1845	303	23	7.6	
	February 1845	274	13	4.7	
	March 1845	292	13	4.5	
	April 1845	260	11	4.2	
	May 1845	296	13	4.4	
	June 1845	280	20	7.1	
	July 1845	245	15	6.1	
	August 1845	251	9	3.6	
	September 1845	237	25	10.5	
	October 1845	283	42	14.8	
	November 1845	265	29	10.9	
	December 1845	267	28	10.5	
1846	January 1846	336	45	13.4	
	February 1846	293	53	18.1	
	March 1846	311	48	15.4	
	April 1846	253	48	19.0	
	May 1846	305	41	13.4	
	June 1846	266	27	10.2	
	July 1846	252	33	13.1	
	August 1846	216	39	18.1	
	September 1846	271	39	14.4	
	October 1846	254	38	15.0	
	November 1846	297	32	10.8	
	December 1846	298	16	5.4	
1847	January 1847	311	10	3.2	
	February 1847	312	6	1.9	
	March 1847	305	11	3.6	
	April 1847	312	57	18.3	
	May 1847	294	36	12.2	Handwashing policy instituted mid-May
	June 1847	268	6	2.2	
	July 1847	250	3	1.2	
	August 1847	264	5	1.9	
	September 1847	262	12	4.6	
	October 1847	278	11	4.0	
	November 1847	246	11	4.5	
	December 1847	273	8	2.9	
1848	January 1848	283	10	3.5	strict controls enforced on students' negligent hand-wash
	February 1848	291	2	0.7	
	March 1848	276	0	0.0	
	April 1848	305	2	0.7	
	May 1848	313	3	1.0	
	June 1848	264	3	1.1	
	July 1848	269	1	0.4	
	August 1848	261	0	0.0	
	September 1848	312	3	1.0	
	October 1848	299	7	2.3	
	November 1848	310	9	2.9	
	December 1848	373	5	1.3	
1849	January 1849	403	9	2.2	
	February 1849	389	12	3.1	
	March 1849	406	20	4.9	Semmelweis' employment terminated

=== Explanatory power of his theory of cadaverous poisoning ===
From his theory of decaying matter on the hands of examining physicians as a cause for childbed fever he was able to explain other features in the dataset, for instance why mortality rates were remarkably higher during winter than summer, because of increased student activity and scheduled autopsies immediately before the rounds at the maternity clinic. He writes:

The prevailing opinion is that winter is the season most conducive to outbreaks of childbed fever. This is explained by the different activities of those who visit the maternity hospital. These activities are determined by the season. After the long vacation in August and September, students resume their studies, including obstetrics, with renewed diligence. In winter the influx of students into the maternity hospital is so great that individuals must wait weeks and even months for their turn to study. In summer, during vacation, half or even two-thirds of the places are vacant. In winter, the pathological and forensic autopsies and the medical and surgical wards are visited industriously by those who also visit the maternity hospital. In summer, the diligence is noticeably less. The charming surroundings of Vienna are more attractive than the reeking morgue or the sultry wards of the hospital.

In winter the assistant of obstetrics holds practical operative exercises on cadavers before the afternoon rounds at the maternity ward at four o'clock, because in the mornings students are otherwise engaged, and following the afternoon rounds, at five o'clock, it is already too dark. In summer the heat is too oppressive before the afternoon visit, and the operative exercises are held in the evening following afternoon rounds.

He was able to explain additional features:

The assistant of the first clinic seldom visited the morgue in the months of December 1846 and January, February, and March 1847. The students followed his example. The opportunity for them to contaminate their hands with cadaverous particles was thereby greatly reduced. Restricting examinations to the minimum also reduced the opportunity for the genitals of patients to be touched by contaminated hands. For these reasons, mortality in the first clinic was reduced during these months.

I had Carl von Rokitansky's permission to dissect all female corpses, including those not already set aside for autopsy, in order to correlate the results of my examinations with autopsies. I devoted nearly every morning before the professor's rounds in the obstetrical clinic to these studies. On 20 March 1847, I reassumed the position of assistant in the first clinic. Early that morning I conducted my gynecological studies in the morgue. I then went to the labor room and began to examine all the patients, as my predecessors and I were obliged to do, so that I could report on each patient during the professor's morning rounds. My hands, contaminated by cadaverous particles, were thereby brought into contact with the genitals of so many women in labor that in April, from 312 deliveries, there were 57 deaths (18.3 percent). Only God knows the number of patients who went prematurely to their graves because of me. I have examined corpses to an extent equaled by few other obstetricians.

He was also able to explain why women with extended dilation invariably died:

"Infection occurs most often during dilation. [...] ..it is frequently necessary to penetrate the uterus in manual examination to determine the location and position of the fetus. Thus, before chlorine washings, almost every patient whose period dilation was extended died of childbed fever."

=== Yearly mortality rates for birthgiving women 1833–58 for first and second clinics ===
A second clinic was started in 1833 because of the large number of women being admitted to the maternity ward. Medical students and midwife students undertook their studies at both clinics. In 1841 however, these two groups were separated. Thereafter, medical students attended the first clinic only, and midwife students attended the second clinic only. Joseph Späth was professor at the second clinic.

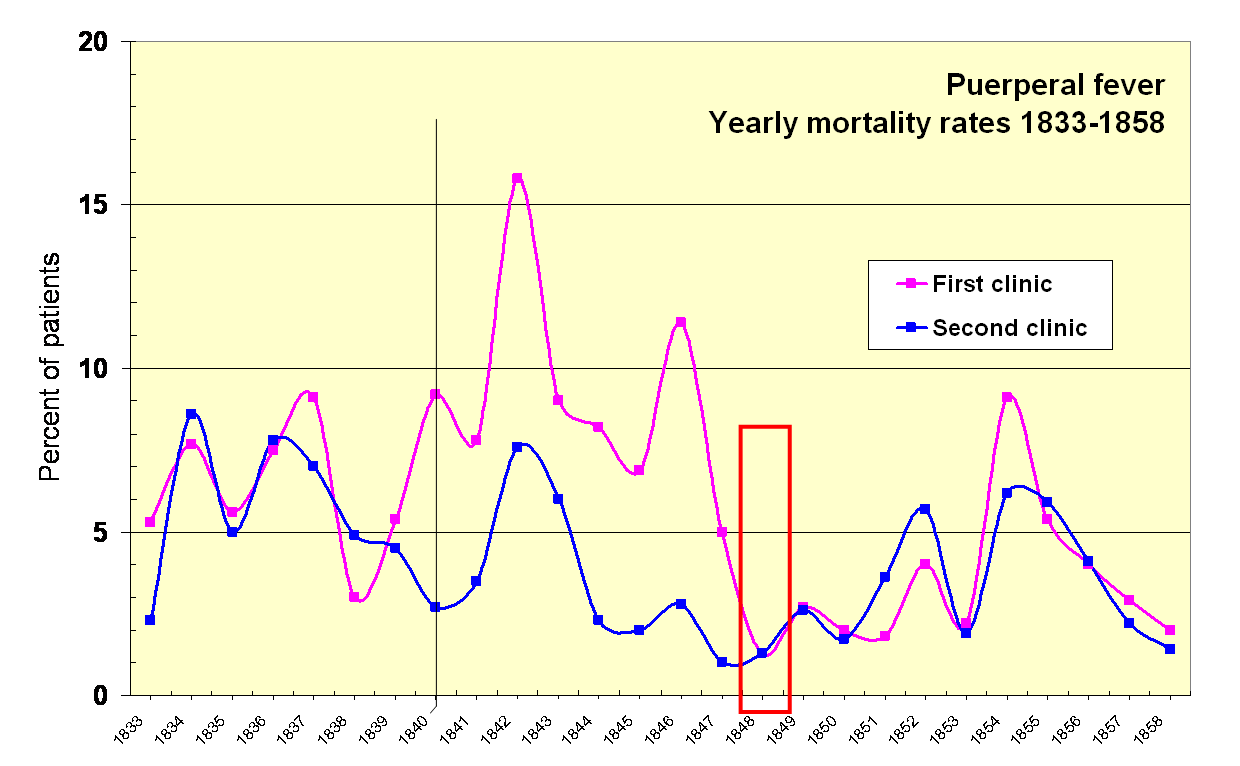
Puerperal fever yearly mortality rates at Vienna Maternity Institution 1833–1858 for first and second obstetrical clinics. Period with Semmelweis' handwashing policy marked with red rectangle

Puerperal fever mortality rates for birthgiving women at the first and second clinic at the Vienna General Hospital 1833–1858 reported by Semmelweis. From 1841 only midwives worked in the second clinic, after which mortality rates were markedly lower than the first clinic. Semmelweis instituted a handwashing policy in the first clinic by mid-May 1847. His employment was terminated March 20, 1849
	First clinic			Second clinic			
Year	Births	Deaths	Rate (%)	Births	Deaths	Rate (%)	Note
1833	3,737	197	5.3	353	8	2.3	Second clinic started
1834	2,657	205	7.7	1,744	150	8.6	
1835	2,573	143	5.6	1,682	84	5.0	
1836	2,677	200	7.5	1,670	131	7.8	
1837	2,765	251	9.1	1,784	124	7.0	
1838	2,987	91	3.0	1,779	88	4.9	
1839	2,781	151	5.4	2,010	91	4.5	
1840	2,889	267	9.2	2,073	55	2.7	
1841	3,036	237	7.8	2,442	86	3.5	Only midwives worked in the second clinic
1842	3,287	518	15.8	2,659	202	7.6	
1843	3,060	274	9.0	2,739	164	6.0	
1844	3,157	260	8.2	2,956	68	2.3	
1845	3,492	241	6.9	3,241	66	2.0	
1846	4,010	459	11.4	3,754	105	2.8	
1847	3,490	176	5.0	3,306	32	1.0	Handwashing in first clinic mid-May
1848	3,556	45	1.3	3,319	43	1.3	
1849	3,858	103	2.7	3,371	87	2.6	Semmelweis dismissed in March
1850	3,745	74	2.0	3,261	54	1.7	
1851	4,194	75	1.8	3,395	121	3.6	
1852	4,471	181	4.0	3,360	192	5.7	
1853	4,221	94	2.2	3,480	67	1.9	
1854	4,393	400	9.1	3,396	210	6.2	
1855	3,659	198	5.4	2,938	174	5.9	
1856	3,925	156	4.0	3,070	125	4.1	
1857	4,220	124	2.9	3,795	83	2.2	
1858	4,203	86	2.0	4,179	60	1.4	

=== Yearly mortality rates for birthgiving women 1784–1849 ===
Semmelweis seeks to demonstrate that the advent of pathological anatomy, and consequently the increase in autopsies, is correlated to the incidence of childbed fever. From 1789–1822 professor Johann Lucas Boër was assigned the teaching post at the maternity ward, however he left the post discouraged of what was then regarded as an enormous mortality rate. He was succeeded by professor Johann Klein who reformed obstetrics to an anatomical orientation emphasizing the value of pathological autopsies. Mortality rates jump markedly.

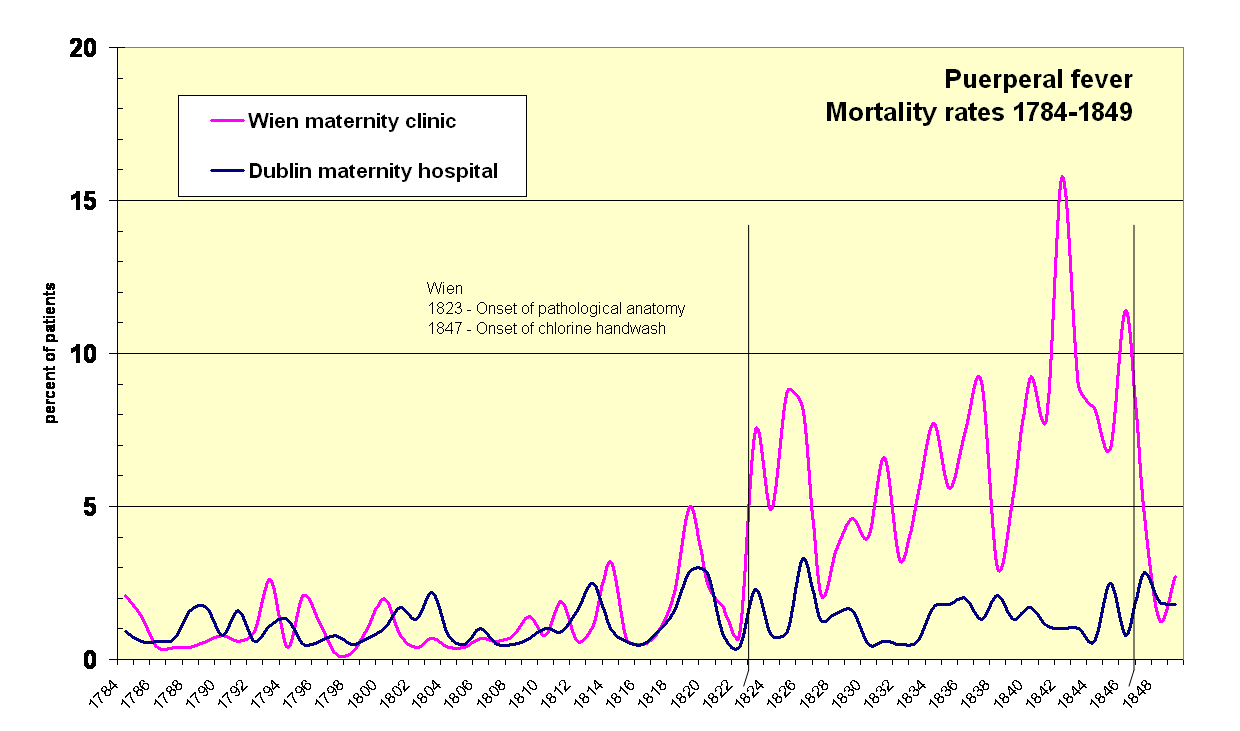
Yearly puerperal fever mortality rates 1784–1849 in Wien and Dublin. Semmelweis seeks to demonstrate that the advent of pathological anatomy in Wien in 1823 is correlated to the incidence of childbed fever. See section below for data for Dublin.

Yearly puerperal fever mortality rates for birthgiving women at Vienna General Hospital's maternity clinic for the period 1784–1849 reported by Semmelweis.
Year	Births	Deaths	Rate (%)	Note
1784	284	6	2.1	No pathological anatomy
1785	899	13	1.4	
1786	1,151	5	0.4	
1787	1,407	5	0.4	
1788	1,425	5	0.4	
1789	1,246	7	0.6	
1790	1,326	10	0.8	
1791	1,395	8	0.6	
1792	1,579	14	0.9	
1793	1,684	44	2.6	
1794	1,768	7	0.4	
1795	1,798	38	2.1	
1796	1,904	22	1.2	
1797	2,012	5	0.2	
1798	2,046	5	0.2	
1799	2,067	20	1.0	
1800	2,070	41	2.0	
1801	2,106	17	0.8	
1802	2,346	9	0.4	
1803	2,215	16	0.7	
1804	2,022	8	0.4	
1805	2,112	9	0.4	
1806	1,875	13	0.7	
1807	925	6	0.6	
1808	855	7	0.8	
1809	912	13	1.4	
1810	744	6	0.8	
1811	1,050	20	1.9	
1812	1,419	9	0.6	
1813	1,945	21	1.1	
1814	2,062	66	3.2	
1815	2,591	19	0.7	
1816	2,410	12	0.5	
1817	2,735	25	0.9	
1818	2,568	56	2.2	
1819	3,089	154	5.0	
1820	2,998	75	2.5	
1821	3,294	55	1.7	
1822	3,066	26	0.8	
1823	2,872	214	7.5	Pathological anatomy begins
1824	2,911	144	4.9	
1825	2,594	229	8.8	
1826	2,359	192	8.1	
1827	2,367	51	2.2	
1828	2,833	101	3.6	
1829	3,012	140	4.6	
1830	2,797	111	4.0	
1831	3,353	222	6.6	
1832	3,331	105	3.2	
1833	3,737	197	5.3	
1834	2,657	205	7.7	
1835	2,573	143	5.6	
1836	2,677	200	7.5	
1837	2,765	251	9.1	
1838	2,987	91	3.0	
1839	2,781	151	5.4	
1840	2,889	267	9.2	
1841	3,036	237	7.8	Separation of clinics
1842	3,287	518	15.8	hereafter numbers refer to first clinic only
1843	3,060	274	9.0	
1844	3,157	260	8.2	
1845	3,492	241	6.9	
1846	4,010	459	11.4	
1847	3,490	176	5.0	Chlorine washings begin mid-May
1848	3,556	45	1.3	
1849	3,858	103	2.7	Semmelweis dismissed from hospital in March

=== Yearly mortality rates for newborn infants 1841–46 for first and second clinics ===
The mortality rate for newborn infants was also higher in the first clinic.

Puerperal fever mortality rates for newborn infants at the first and second clinic at the Vienna General Hospital 1841–1846 reported by Semmelweis.
	First clinic			Second clinic		
Year	Births	Deaths	Rate (%)	Births	Deaths	Rate (%)
1841	2,813	177	6.3	2,252	91	4.0
1842	3,037	279	9.2	2,414	113	4.7
1843	2,828	195	6.9	2,570	130	5.1
1844	2,917	251	8.6	2,739	100	3.7
1845	3,201	260	8.1	3,017	97	3.2
1846	3,533	235	6.7	3,398	86	2.5

== Yearly patient mortality rates at the Dublin Maternity Hospital 1784–1849 ==
Semmelweis compared mortality rates in Vienna with maternity institutions in the United Kingdom where mortality rates were lower. He wished to show that childbed fever was related to pathological anatomy. His choice, Dublin Maternity Hospital, was like the Viennese hospital, a large teaching institution for physicians.

He argued that, as a rule, German and French maternity hospitals are associated with large general hospitals. Therefore, their students occupy themselves in morgues, and in medical and surgical wards, as well as in maternity wards. In this way they become carriers of the decaying matter responsible for childbed fever.

Contrary hereto, maternity hospitals in the United Kingdom were independent institutions; removed from general hospitals. The students are forced to concern themselves exclusively with obstetrics, they do not carry out pathological autopsies.

Yearly puerperal fever mortality rates for birthgiving women at Dublin Maternity Hospital for the period 1784–1849 reported by Semmelweis.
Year	Births	Deaths	Rate (%)
1784	1261	11	0.9
1785	1292	8	0.6
1786	1351	8	0.6
1787	1347	10	0.7
1788	1469	23	1.6
1789	1435	25	1.7
1790	1546	12	0.8
1791	1602	25	1.6
1792	1631	10	0.6
1793	1747	19	1.1
1794	1543	20	1.3
1795	1503	7	0.5
1796	1621	10	0.6
1797	1712	13	0.8
1798	1604	8	0.5
1799	1537	10	0.7
1800	1837	18	1
1801	1725	30	1.7
1802	1985	26	1.3
1803	2028	44	2.2
1804	1915	16	0.8
1805	2220	12	0.5
1806	2406	23	1
1807	2511	12	0.5
1808	2665	13	0.5
1809	2889	21	0.7
1810	2854	29	1
1811	2561	24	0.9
1812	2676	43	1.6
1813	2484	62	2.5
1814	2508	25	1
1815	3075	17	0.6
1816	3314	18	0.5
1817	3473	32	0.9
1818	3539	56	1.6
1819	3197	94	2.9
1820	2458	70	2.8
1821	2849	22	0.8
1822	2675	12	0.4
1823	2584	59	2.3
1824	2446	20	0.8
1825	2740	26	0.9
1826	2440	81	3.3
1827	2550	33	1.3
1828	2856	43	1.5
1829	2141	34	1.6
1830	2288	12	0.5
1831	2176	12	0.6
1832	2242	12	0.5
1833	2138	12	0.6
1834	2024	34	1.7
1835	1902	34	1.8
1836	1810	36	2
1837	1833	24	1.3
1838	2126	45	2.1
1839	1951	25	1.3
1840	1521	26	1.7
1841	2003	23	1.1
1842	2171	21	1
1843	2210	22	1
1844	2288	14	0.6
1845	1411	35	2.5
1846	2025	17	0.8
1847	1703	47	2.8
1848	1816	35	1.9
1849	2063	38	1.8

== Contamination of midwives' hands ==
The second obstetrical clinic at Vienna General Hospital that instructed midwife students evidently had a lower mortality rate than the first obstetrical clinic, where physicians were instructed.

While the midwife students in Vienna were not partaking in autopsies, there were still opportunities for them to contaminate their hands. In a lecture in 1846 Jakob Kolletschka is reputed to have said, "It is here no uncommon thing for midwives, especially in the commencement of their practice, to pull off legs and arms of infants, and even to pull away the entire body and leave the head in the uterus. Such occurrences are not altogether uncommon; they often happen."

The Maternité in Paris was an exception. It was exclusively for the education of midwives, but it had a mortality rate as great as Paul-Antoine Dubois's Paris Clinic for the education of physicians. In the Maternité, midwives participated in autopsies as frequently physicians would elsewhere.

The hospital midwives and some of their students accompanied the physician on his daily rounds through the infirmary for maternity patients. Each student was assigned a diseased patient for particular observation and was expected to prepare a short case history of the birth and of the physician's treatment. Autopsies were conducted in a building in the garden somewhat removed from the maternity hospital; these were usually attended by student midwives. I was often astonished to see the active part some of the young women took in the dissection of corpses. With bare and bloody arms, holding large knives in their hands, laughing and quarreling, they cut the pelvis apart, having received permission from the physician to prepare the corpse for him.
