= Alexander Gordon (physician) =

Scottish physician (1752–1799)

- Born: 20 May 1752; Milton of Drum, Aberdeenshire, Scotland
- Died: 19 October 1799 (aged 47); Logie, Aberdeenshire, Scotland
- Education: Marischal College, Aberdeen
- Occupations: Physician and obstetrician
- Known for: Demonstrating infectious nature of puerperal fever
- Medical career
- Institutions: Aberdeen Dispensary
- Notable works: Treatise on the Epidemic Puerperal Fever of Aberdeen

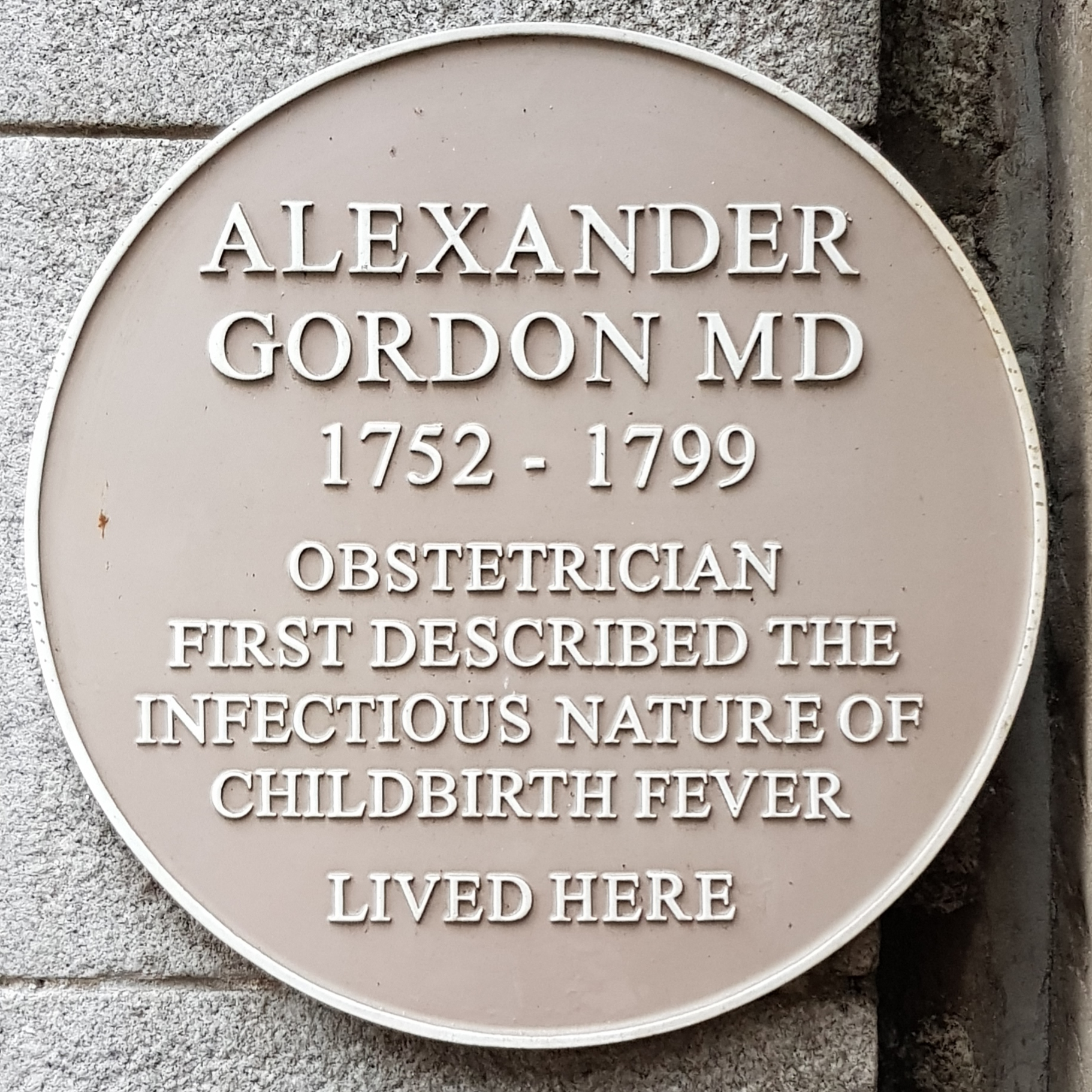
Plaque commemorating Alexander Gordon MD at Belmont Street, Aberdeen

Alexander Gordon MA, MD (20 May 1752 – 19 October 1799) was a Scottish obstetrician best known for clearly demonstrating the contagious nature of puerperal sepsis (childbirth fever). By systematically recording details of all visits to women with the condition, he concluded that it was spread from patient to patient by the attending midwife or doctor, and he published these findings in his 1795 paper "Treatise on the Epidemic Puerperal Fever of Aberdeen". On the basis of these conclusions, he advised that the spread could be limited by fumigation of the clothing and burning of the bed linen used by women with the condition and by cleanliness of her medical and midwife attendants. He also recognised a connection between puerperal fever and erysipelas, a skin infection later shown to be caused by the bacterium Streptococcus pyogenes, the same organism that causes puerperal fever. His paper gave insights into the contagious nature of puerperal sepsis around half a century before the better-known publications of Ignaz Semmelweis and Oliver Wendell Holmes and some eighty years before the role of bacteria as infecting agents was clearly understood. Gordon's textbook The Practice of Physik gives valuable insights into medical practice in the later years of the Enlightenment. He advised that clinical decisions be based on personal observations and experience rather than ancient aphorisms.

== Early life and education ==
Gordon's Treatise on the Epidemic Puerperal Fever of Aberdeen

Alexander Gordon was born in 1752 in the farmstead of Milton of Drum, Aberdeenshire, Scotland. His father, also Alexander Gordon, was a tenant farmer at Milton of Drum, some nine miles to the west of Aberdeen city centre. Alexander's twin brother James achieved a degree of local fame for his role in developing the swede, which would go on to become a staple of the Scottish diet. Between 1771 and 1775 Alexander Gordon studied for an arts degree at the University of Aberdeen's Marischal College, graduating Master of Arts (MA). Intent on a career in medicine he received some clinical teaching by 'walking the wards' at Aberdeen Infirmary. Because Aberdeen at that time did not have regular undergraduate classes in medicine and the university did not award medical degrees, he enrolled in medical classes in Leyden, Holland, one of the leading medical schools in Europe and a favourite destination for Scots to study medicine. In 1779–80 he attended the lectures of the anatomist Alexander Monro secundus in Edinburgh, and the notes which he made of those lectures are retained in the library of the University of Aberdeen. He did not graduate in medicine at either Leiden or Edinburgh but acquired sufficient knowledge to sit and pass the examination at the Company of Surgeons (later the Royal College of Surgeons) and earn a Certificate of Proficiency.

== Medical career ==
Gordon enlisted in the Royal Navy in 1780 as a surgeon's mate. In 1781 he was promoted to surgeon, and in 1785, as was common at the time, he left the navy on half pay. From April 1785 he stayed in London as a resident pupil at the Store Street Lying-in Hospital. There he attended lectures on childbirth given by obstetricians Thomas Denman and William Osborne and gained practical experience by attending deliveries. He also attended the Middlesex Lying-in Hospital. For further experience in surgery he attended dissections and lectures at the Westminster Hospital.

Aware that there was no practising obstetrician in Aberdeen he returned there in 1785, taking the post of physician to the Aberdeen Dispensary in February 1786. This post involved seeing patients in the Dispensary and in their homes.

He was awarded the degree of MD from the University of Aberdeen in 1788.

=== Aberdeen puerperal fever epidemics ===
Between 1789 and 1792 Aberdeen witnessed two epidemics, of erysipelas and of puerperal fever, both of which started and ended within the same time period. Puerperal fever had not previously been recognised in the city, but it was a condition with which Gordon was familiar through his experience in London. Meticulous note-keeping was a feature of the Scottish Enlightenment, and Gordon kept careful notes of all his medical visits. By recording the names of the midwives and doctors who had attended affected women and their dates of attendance, he concluded that the medical attendants were the carriers of the disease. He localised as the carriers of the illness a small number of midwives and also demonstrated that he himself had been a carrier of it. He confessed that "It is a disagreeable declaration for me to mention that I myself was the means of carrying the disease to a great number of women."

Gordon treated the illness with venesection (bleeding) and purging, both standard remedies at the time for inflammatory conditions, but he also emphasised the need for cleanliness on the part of the medical and nursing attendants, which was not generally accepted at that time.

He considered that the cause of puerperal sepsis was a "specific contagion or infection" rather than a "noxious constitution of the atmosphere", a reference to the miasma theory that was the generally accepted cause of such illnesses. He speculated that the disease was transmitted by "putrid particles" explaining that "after delivery infectious matter is readily and copiously admitted by the numerous patulous orifices [of the birth canal] which are open to imbibe it."

He recognised a relationship with the spread of an epidemic of the skin infection erysipelas, which began, peaked, and ended over the same period of time as the puerperal fever epidemic. He concluded that "the cause was obvious, for the infectious matter which produces erysipelas was at the time readily absorbed by the lymphatics which were open to receive it."

His views on prevention were also innovative. He wrote "The patient's apparel and bedclothes ought either to be burnt or thoroughly purified; and the nurses and physicians ought carefully to wash themselves and to get their apparel properly fumigated before it be put on again." These recommendations were influenced by the success of the naval surgeon James Lind (1716–94) and the military surgeon Sir John Pringle (1707–82), who had improved the outcome of infectious disease by the introduction of sanitary improvements in the Royal Navy and the British army, respectively. In his treatise Gordon quotes from the works of each of these.

As was common Gordon had named the patients and midwives in his Treatise, and this had made him unpopular with both groups. The midwives he wrote "raised an odium against my practice..." He had realised the risks involved in divulging the names, writing "I saw the danger of disclosing the fatal secret." As the midwives and women of Aberdeen turned against him, he bitterly described "the ungenerous treatment which I met with from that very sex whose sufferings I was at so much pains to relieve." By the end of his time in Aberdeen his patients, the midwives, fellow doctors, and the Aberdeen public had all become openly hostile toward him.

Gordon's clear demonstration of the contagious nature of puerperal fever and his advocacy of disinfection of the hands and clothes of medical attendants was published 48 years before The Contagiousness of Puerperal Fever (1843) by Oliver Wendall Holmes. Holmes quoted from and gave generous credit to Gordon. Ignaz Semmelweiss published his seminal work Die Aetilogie der Begriff und die Prophylaxis des Kindbettfiebers 66 years after Gordon's Treatise, and it made no mention of Gordon or his work.

=== The Practice of Physik ===
Gordon's textbook of medicine was written between 1786 and 1795 and remained in possession of his family until 1913, when it was donated to the Library of Aberdeen University. In it Gordon described contemporary medical practice, which was becoming increasingly based on evidence from recorded observations. He wrote of his admiration for "the rational physician". Yet he continued to practice 'humoral' medicine as shown by his use of venesection and purging in women with puerperal fever. His advocacy of the need for a humane and caring attitude towards patients was clearly influenced by John Gregory, Professor of the Practice of Physic at the University of Edinburgh and one of the originators of secular concepts of medical ethics.

== Family and later life ==
On 5 February 1784 Gordon married Elizabeth Harvie. They had two daughters, Elizabeth, who died young, and Mary, who married one of Gordon's pupils, Robert Harvey of Braco. Gordon's grandson Alexander Harvey (1811–1889) was Professor of Materia Medica at the University of Aberdeen.

Gordon left Aberdeen in 1795 when he was recalled to the Royal Navy, serving as surgeon on HMS Adamant from January to April 1796 and on HMS Overyssel until August 1799.

He contracted pulmonary tuberculosis and returned to the farm of his brother James in Logie, Aberdeenshire, where he died in 1799.

== Selected publications ==
- Observations of the Efficacy of Cold-Bathing in the Prevention and Cure of Diseases. (1786) Aberdeen. J Chalmers & Co.
- Treatise on the Epidemic Puerperal Fever of Aberdeen (1795) London, G. G. and J. Robinson
- The practice of Physick (2011) (Transcribed with Glossary and Notes by P Bennett). Milton Keynes: AuthorHouse;.
