= Septic pelvic thrombophlebitis =

Rare postpartum complication

Septic pelvic thrombophlebitis (SPT), also known as suppurative pelvic thrombophlebitis, is a rare postpartum complication which consists of a persistent postpartum fever that is not responsive to broad-spectrum antibiotics, in which pelvic infection leads to infection of the vein wall and intimal damage leading to thrombogenesis in the ovarian veins (left or right, although right is more common due to dextroversion of the uterus). The thrombus is then invaded by microorganisms. Ascending infections cause 99% of postpartum SPT.

Septic pelvis thrombophlembitis is a cause of post-operative fever from untreated postpartum endometritis or parametritis. After 48 hours of unresolved postpartum endometritis (notably 48 hours of fever that is unaffected by antibiotics), SPT is assumed until proven otherwise (with pelvic radiography). Imaging studies can be helpful in patient refractory to broad-spectrum parenteral antibiotics to look for abscess, retained products, or septic pelvic thrombophlebitis. Current treatments consist of a combination of antibiotics selected based on suspected pathogen(s), and anticoagulants.

Though the greatest risk factors involve delivery or delivery-related complications, in some rare cases, SPT may arise after abortion procedures and in non-pregnant people with pelvic infections, pelvic surgeries, uterine fibroids, or underlying cancer.

SPT can also be further subcategorized into ovarian vein thrombosis (OVT) or puerperal ovarian vein thrombophlebitis (POVT) and deep septic pelvic thrombosis (DSPT).

== Pathogenesis ==
Septic pelvic thrombophlebitis (SPT) is an inflammatory process that, in conjunction with the physiological conditions of postpartum and proximity with potentially infected tissues (e.g. endometrium, chorion, amniotic fluid), leads to the formation of a clot blocking the ovarian vein. Injury of the ovarian vein endothelium during delivery or pelvic operations and bacterial invasion from nearby tissues triggers an inflammatory response within the vein wall. Bacteria, viruses and physical trauma can trigger prothrombic processes within the body through inflammation and tissue factor expression on endothelial cells and monocytes that activates the intrinsic coagulation pathway.

In addition to the intravascular vessel wall damage, Virchow's triad of thrombogenesis is completed by the hypercoagulable state of pregnancy up to 6 weeks postpartum and blood stasis from both laying down in a hospital bed for an extended amount of time without walking and pregnancy-induced ovarian venous dilatation. Deep vein thrombosis is generally a concern in operations involving the pelvis or lower extremities wherein during recovery, a person's ability to ambulate is limited after the operation. Blood stasis and thrombogenesis within the ovarian vein specifically is especially of concern after cesarean sections due to the combination of inevitable physical trauma to the intima of pelvic blood vessels, the three-fold increase in diameter if the ovarian veins, and that pooling of the blood in the pelvis as this is the lowest part of the person while laying in a hospital bed. Notably, most cases of SPT involve the right ovarian vein rather than the left ovarian vein due to its greater length, weaker valves, and left-to-right venous flow in the pelvic region while sitting in the upright position.

Ovarian veins have close connections with the uterine and vaginal venous plexuses that are in proximity to tissues commonly host to pathogens, notably in cases of vaginosis or endometritis. Pathogens from these adjacent tissues infect the forming clot, and contributing to a positive feedback loop of inflammation. Bacterial organisms associated with SPT include anaerobic and aerobic streptococci, Proteus species, Bacteriodes species, staphylococci, E. coli, and Klebsiella. Sepsis occurs after the pathogens infect and proliferate in the thrombus within the lumen, leading to persistent bacteremia. Fatal complications include septic shock and septic pulmonary embolism, leading to acute respiratory distress syndrome.

== Signs and symptoms ==
Septic pelvic thrombophlebitis (SPT) is often difficult to diagnose due to the absence of physical signs and symptoms. SPT initially and most commonly presents as a fever anywhere from 5 to 21 days after delivery. Temperatures of fever have been reported to be within 103 °F to 104 °F.

The symptoms of SPT are similar to those of endometritis. Clinical signs include:

- prolonged spiking fever
- pain on palpation of uterus
- midline lower abdominal pain
- malodorous lochia (vaginal discharge)
- tachycardia
- tender abdominal mass
- shortness of breath

In rare cases, more serious postpartum complications may occur as a result of SPT such as pulmonary embolism.

== Risk factors ==
Septic pelvic thrombophlembitis (SPT) occurs most often in bedridden patients after giving birth, or after having undergone a Caesarean section. The main risk factor of developing SPT is postpartum endometritis, which in turn is most commonly caused by a Caesarean section. The blood often pools in the pelvis as this is the lowest part of the patient while laying in a hospital bed. Other risk factors for developing endometritis, and subsequently SPT include:

- Bacterial vaginosis
- Chorioamnionitis
- Large amount of meconium in amniotic fluid
- Manual removal of the placenta
- Prolonged labor
- Multiple cervical examinations
- Multiple gestations
- Pre-eclampsia
- pelvic inflammatory disease
- intrauterine device insertion

== Diagnosis ==
Septic pelvic thrombophlebitis (SPT) is mostly suspected when a spiking fever is not resolved using a broad spectrum antibiotic therapy. People often experience flank or abdominal pain which is non-colic and constant. The pain can vary in intensity and location. Most often, SPT is diagnosed by the presence of fever, leucocytosis or positive blood cultures despite treating them with the standard antibiotic therapy. Due to the nature of SPT, such as rare incidence and lack of specific clinical signs and symptoms, it is often misdiagnosed.

SPT is very complex and difficult to see through scans because sometimes small blood clots cannot be detected by these machines. Due to the difficulty in suspecting thrombi in the ovarian veins, sometimes a presumptive diagnosis can be made in persons, especially in postpartum women. This is the reason even healthy postpartum women are considered for anticoagulation therapy without no visualization of a thrombus in their scans.

=== Imaging ===
The best way to surely diagnose SPT is by using a contrast-enhanced computed tomography (CT) scan. Imaging tools such as computed tomography (CT) and magnetic resonance imaging (MRI) are used to visually confirm presence of a thrombosed vessel. CT and MRI show comparable results in diagnosing SPT but ultrasound has a lower detection ability. Ultrasound can be helpful in some cases when there is already a confirmed thrombus present in addition to a positive blood culture result. It is not useful to evaluate a dural or pelvic vein thrombophlebitis because of its poor penetration abilities.

Once the scan confirms the presence of a clot in addition to inflammation indicating thrombosis, it can be inferred looking at the blood cultures and symptoms that SPT is present. Other laboratory tests like the complete blood count, blood chemistries, liver tests, enzyme tests, INR/ PT ratios for anticoagulation can also be done. Ultrasonographic imaging can also support diagnosis of SPT.

In the diagnosis of OVT, a characteristic sonographic finding will be an extended hypoechoic mass located anteriorly to the psoas. Additionally, sonographic imaging will show a thrombosed and enlarged ovarian vein.

=== Laboratory results ===
Septic pelvic thrombophlebitis will show laboratory results reflective of active inflammation such as elevated C-reactive protein (CRP) and white blood cell count (WBC).

If available, both central and peripheral tip cultures should be sent for testing. Depending on type and site of infection, gram stain and purulent culture can also be sent.

=== Differential diagnosis ===
There are many other conditions that can mimic SPT, for example deep vein thrombosis (DVT) or other symptoms commonly experienced by cancer therapy patients. Cancer therapy patients can also be experiencing bacterium positive results due to other agents which they cannot fight due to severe immuno-compromised abilities.

Since septic pelvic thrombophlebitis is a diagnosis of exclusion, other causes of postpartum fever must be considered, such as infection of cesarean section wounds, episiotomy or laceration sites as well as endometritis, endomyometritis, mastitis, and physiologic breast engorgement.

== Treatment ==
=== Invasive procedures ===
Before pharmacological therapy was introduced, surgical procedures such as surgical excision of the thrombosed vein and venous ligation (tying off the vein in order to prevent blood from collecting in the vein) were the mainstays of treatment for septic pelvic thrombophlebitis. These procedures are now only reserved for severe cases of SPT when pharmacological therapy is not effective.

The advancement of medical technology and diagnostic tools has allowed for non-invasive treatment for SPT, such as anticoagulant and antimicrobial therapy.

=== Pharmacological therapy ===
Septic pelvic thrombophlebitis (SPT) is often associated with postpartum endometritis, so antibiotics are selected based on guidelines to treat endometritis. The first line treatment includes a combination of intravenous clindamycin and gentamicin. If enterococcus is suspected or isolated, ampicillin or vancomycin may be added to therapy. Clindamycin and gentamicin are not effective against enterococcus. Treated individuals typically respond to antibiotic treatment within 48 hours and fevers resolve within 96 hours. Intravenous administration of antibiotics are continued until the fever is resolved, pain improves, and the leukocyte count returns to baseline.

Clindamycin is an expensive antibiotic relative to other classes of antibiotics such as cephalosporins and penicillins. Therefore, there is concern about the availability of this drug in low-income settings. There is a study that compared the use of penicillin plus gentamicin versus clindamycin plus gentamicin, which showed an increased rate of treatment failure of postpartum endometritis while on the penicillin and gentamicin combination. Although there is stronger evidence supporting the clinical efficacy of the clindamycin and gentamicin combination to treat postpartum endometritis, economic factors play a large role when selecting the best treatment regimen for a person.

The use of anticoagulation therapy is due to the underlying etiology of SPT which involves the promotion of the coagulation cascade. A report revealed a rare case where a person developed a pulmonary embolism as a result of SPT and were successfully treated with warfarin. However, in most or all cases, unfractionated heparin or low-molecular-weight heparin have been used.

Heparin is commonly used in addition to antimicrobial therapy for the treatment of SPT. It is added to therapy if the person still has a persistent fever after five days despite being on antibiotics. In a study which looked at forty-six postpartum persons with SPT who received heparin in addition to penicillin or chloramphenicol, over ninety percent responded with favorable outcomes such as reduced fever by no more than seven days. The average length of heparin treatment which has been shown to induce an afebrile, or reduced fever, state is typically eight to nine days.

However, there is conflicting evidence which shows that the addition of heparin does not provide any added therapeutic benefit to antimicrobial therapy. A study involving fifteen persons who were diagnosed with SPT over a three year period compared clinical outcomes of persons with SPT who received only antimicrobial therapy versus the addition of heparin to antimicrobial therapy. The study concluded that there was no statistically significant difference in clinical outcomes, such as the length of fever and duration of their hospital stay.

In people with persistent fevers after receiving antimicrobial therapy, a CT scan is recommended for further investigation.

== Epidemiology ==
Septic pelvic thrombophlebitis is a rare complication of pregnancy. A report states that a pregnant woman undergoing a cesarean section increases the risk of developing SPT . The incidence of SPT occurred in about 1 per 9000 vaginal deliveries and 1 per 800 cesarean sections. The overall incidence of SPT was 1 per 3000 deliveries.

In a study that involved 44,922 deliveries, fifteen women were diagnosed with pelvic thrombophlebitis. However, no complications or deaths were reported.

== History ==
Septic pelvic thrombophlebitis was first described and diagnosed by von Recklinhausen at the end of the 19th century. It was initially described as a pelvic infection where there was the presence of a thrombosis in one or both of the ovarian veins. This disease had a high incidence and mortality during this time period. Since this discovery occurred prior to the antibiotic era, von Recklinhausen proposed surgical excision as the preferred treatment. In 1951, Collins published and advocated the practice of ligature of the inferior vena and ovarian veins as the most effective treatment. It was reported that there was a 90 percent survival rate after the surgery. It was not until the late 1960s that combination antibiotic and heparin therapy became the preferred treatment plan for SPT. After pharmacological therapy became the preferred treatment for SPT, mortality rates drastically decreased. Furthermore, the advances in diagnostic tools (e.g. computed tomography and magnetic resonance imaging) and understanding of the disease contributed to improving treatment outcomes. Although the management of this disease has seen much improvement since its discovery at the end of the 19th century, there is still controversy in deciding what the most optimal treatment plan is. Antibiotic therapy is still the preferred treatment if SPT is expected, but adding on heparin is still up for debate because of conflicting evidence of whether or not it provides a therapeutic benefit.
