= Joseph Hermann Schmidt =

German scientist (1804–1852)

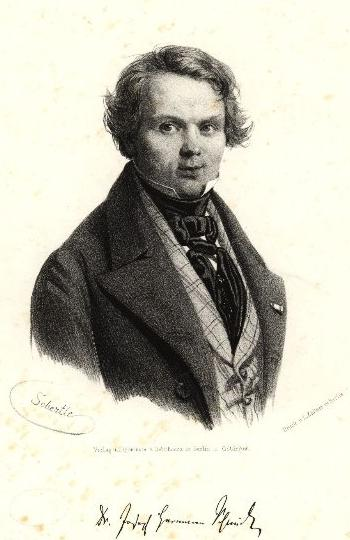
- Born: 14 June 1804; Paderborn
- Died: 15 May 1852 (aged 47); Berlin
- Scientific career
- Institutions: Humboldt University of Berlin

Joseph Hermann Schmidt (14 June 1804 – 15 May 1852) was professor of obstetrics in Berlin, and official of the Prussian cultural ministry.

== Biography ==
He was born in 1804.

In 1834 he became head of the Paderborn general hospital and eventually also of the Paderborn maternity clinic. He wrote a textbook of obstetrics widely used in Prussia. In 1842, together with Pauline von Mallinckrodt, he founded a private institution for the blind in Paderborn. In 1844 he became an official in the Prussian Ministry of Culture, the head of the gynecological section of the Berlin Charité Clinic and professor of obstetrics at the Humboldt University of Berlin. He died in 1852 of a lung bleeding.

== Legacy ==
A biography on Schmidt was published in 1939.

== Controversy with Ignaz Semmelweis ==
Schmidt approved of obstetrical students having ready access to morgues in which they could spend time while waiting for the labor process. For this he had a controversy with Ignaz Semmelweis who identified contamination as the principal source of high mortality rates from puerperal fever. In an editorial in 1850 he wrote:

"A normal birth is often a slow process and it would be unreasonable to expect every young man .. to remain in the delivery room... In this respect it is very convenient that maternity wards are under the same roof as other clinics. [Students] are thus able to go into surgical or medical wards ... or they can go into the morgue from where they can be quickly called if significant change occurs."

While he disagreed with Semmelweis that contaminated hands was the only cause of puerperal fever he thought that Semmelweis' observations regarding the positive effects of chlorine washings were "totally sufficient to warrant caution", and stated that "this inexpensive requirement will be adopted into practice at every obstetrical clinic."

Semmelweis also scorned Schmidt of underreporting deaths from childbed fever: From 1844 to 1852 there were only 13 deaths out of 2,631 patients at the Charité. In the same period however, 442 patients "were transferred to other stations". Semmelweis was quick to point out that patients are transferred as soon as their health becomes doubtful.

== Works ==
- Joseph Hermann Schmidt (1825) De corporum heterogeneorum in plantis animalibusque Genesi
- Joseph Hermann Schmidt (1839) Lehrbuch der Geburtskunde für die Hebammen in den kgl. preußischen Staaten
