= Bělá nad Svitavou =

Municipality in the Czech Republic

- Municipality
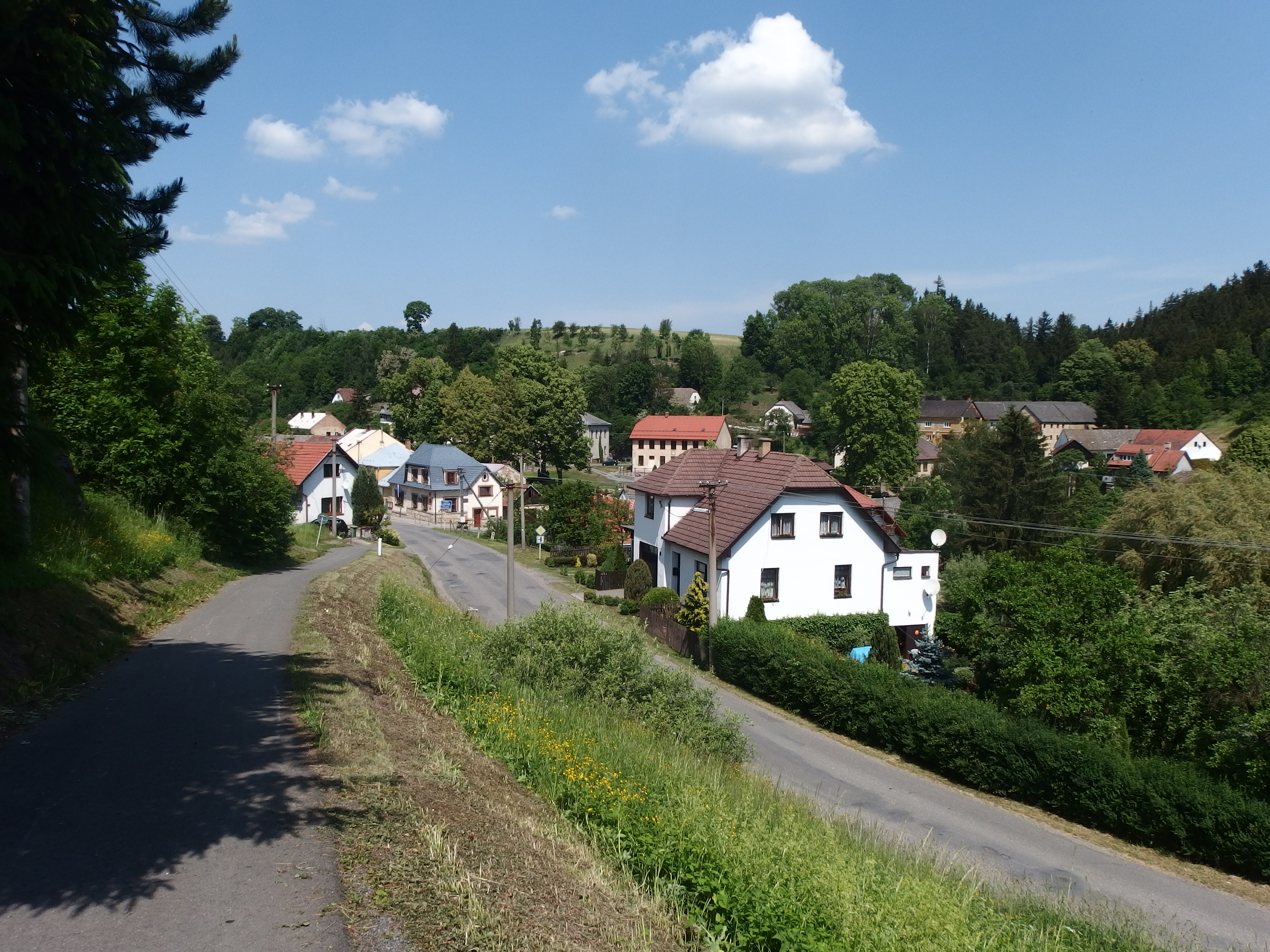
- Centre of Bělá nad Svitavou

- Flag Coat of arms

- Location in the Czech Republic
- Coordinates: 49°38′25″N 16°28′58″E
- Country: Czech Republic
- Region: Pardubice
- District: Svitavy
- First mentioned: 1502

Area
  - Total: 11.56 km^{2} (4.46 sq mi)
- Elevation: 420 m (1,380 ft)

Population (2026-01-01)
  - Total: 476
  - Density: 41.2/km^{2} (107/sq mi)
- Time zone: UTC+1 (CET)
  - Summer (DST): UTC+2 (CEST)
- Postal code: 569 05
- Website: www.obec-bela.cz

Bělá nad Svitavou is a municipality and village in Svitavy District in the Pardubice Region of the Czech Republic. It has about 500 inhabitants.

== Demographics ==
Historical population
| Year | Pop. | ±% |
|---|---|---|
| 1869 | 1,053 | — |
| 1880 | 1,167 | +10.8% |
| 1890 | 1,209 | +3.6% |
| 1900 | 1,225 | +1.3% |
| 1910 | 1,259 | +2.8% |
| 1921 | 1,098 | −12.8% |
| 1930 | 1,158 | +5.5% |
| 1950 | 693 | −40.2% |
| 1961 | 736 | +6.2% |
| 1970 | 708 | −3.8% |
| 1980 | 605 | −14.5% |
| 1991 | 498 | −17.7% |
| 2001 | 477 | −4.2% |
| 2011 | 505 | +5.9% |
| 2021 | 485 | −4.0% |
Source: Censuses

== Notable people ==
- Jakob Kolletschka (1803–1847), Czech-Austrian pathologist and forensic doctor
