= Fødselsstiftelsen =

Maternity institution in Copenhagen, Denmark

Coordinates: 55.6856°N 12.5943°E

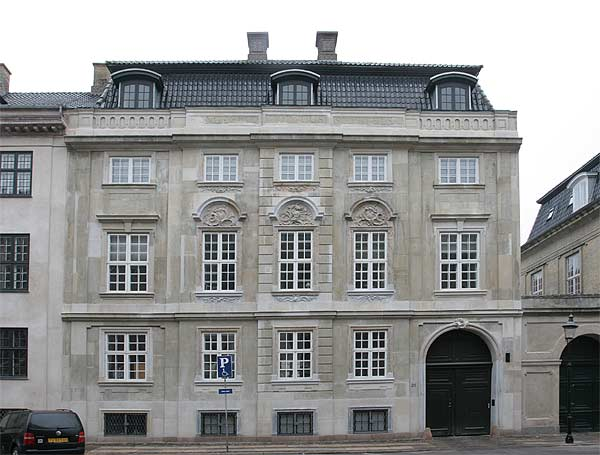
Recent photo of the old maternity house in Amaliegade

Fødselsstiftelsen, also referred to as Fødsels- og Plejestiftelsen (antiquated spelling: Fødsels- og Pleiestiftelsen; Literal translation: Maternity and Caring Institution), was a Danish maternity institution in Amaliegade in Copenhagen, Denmark.

The institution was created for women to give birth anonymously and receiving free medical care. The purpose was to avoid infanticide. The woman was offered eternal anonymity, however this ruling was changed in 2007, and the archive is now accessible, mostly for genealogy purposes.

== History ==
Frederiks Hospital, early seat of Fødsels- og Plejestiftelsen, likely in 1752 or shortly thereafter.

A primitive maternity house in Gothersgade was established by Frederick V in 1750. It was in 1759 moved to Frederiks Hospital. The Royal Maternity House was founded by Queen Juliane Marie on 9 April 1785 by moving it to a new building next to a new building next to the hospital. Its new building was the former home of the architect Lauritz de Thurah.

Fødselsstiftelsen was part of Rigshospitalet from 1910. It gradually developed into a department for complicated births. In 1994, it became part of Rigshospitalet's Juliane Marie Center.

== See also ==
- Carl Edvard Marius Levy
