= Endometritis =

Inflammation of the lining of the uterus

- Other names: Postpartum endometritis, endomyometritis
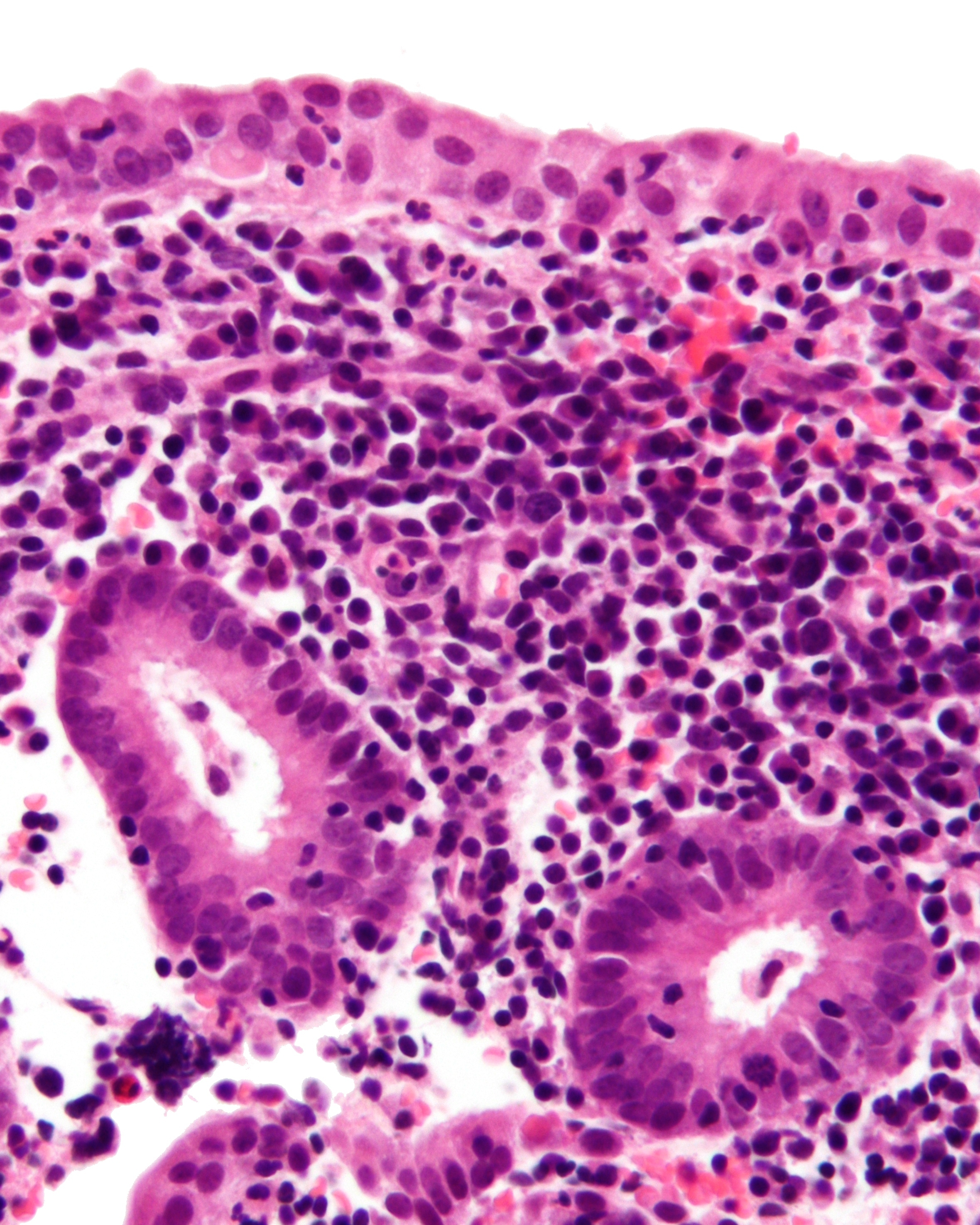
- Micrograph showing a chronic endometritis with the characteristic plasma cells. Scattered neutrophils are also present. H&E stain.
- Specialty: Gynaecology, obstetrics
- Symptoms: Fever, lower abdominal pain, abnormal vaginal bleeding, discharge
- Types: Acute, chronic
- Causes: Infectious
- Risk factors: Abortion, menstruation, childbirth, placement of an IUD, douching
- Treatment: Antibiotics
- Prognosis: Good with treatment
- Frequency: 2% (following vaginal delivery), 10% (following scheduled C-section)

Endometritis is inflammation of the inner lining of the uterus (endometrium). Signs and symptoms may include fever, lower abdominal pain, and abnormal vaginal bleeding or discharge. It is the most common cause of infection after childbirth. It is also part of spectrum of diseases that make up pelvic inflammatory disease.

Endometritis is divided into acute and chronic forms. The acute form is usually from an infection that passes through the cervix as a result of an abortion, during menstruation, following childbirth, or as a result of douching or placement of an IUD. Risk factors for endometritis following delivery include Caesarean section and prolonged rupture of membranes. Chronic endometritis is more common after menopause. The diagnosis may be confirmed by endometrial biopsy. Ultrasound may be useful to verify that there is no retained tissue within the uterus. The most common bacterial causes of endometritis are genital mycoplasmas, aerobes, and anaerobes.

Treatment is usually with antibiotics. Recommendations for treatment of endometritis following delivery includes clindamycin with gentamicin. Testing for and treating gonorrhea and chlamydia in those at risk is also recommended. Chronic disease may be treated with doxycycline. Outcomes with treatment are generally good.

Rates of endometritis are about 2% following vaginal delivery, 10% following scheduled C-section, and 30% with rupture of membranes before C-section if preventive antibiotics are not used. The term "endomyometritis" may be used when inflammation of the endometrium and the myometrium is present. The condition is also relatively common in other animals such as cows.

== Signs and symptoms ==
=== Physical exam findings ===
Acute, chronic, and postpartum endometritis present differently during physical exams. The most common symptoms of acute endometritis are vaginal discharge, sudden pelvic pain, and reoccurring pain during intercourse. Fevers and general unwellness are common in severe cases. Chronic endometritis is usually asymptomatic, although patients may present with nonspecific symptoms such as vaginal bleeding, discharge, or discomfort. People experiencing postpartum endometritis most commonly presents with fevers within 48 hours after delivery.

Symptom onset typically occurs 2-3 days following childbirth, although when fever appears within hours after delivery alongside low blood pressure, it strongly suggests an infection with β-hemolytic streptococci. In postpartum endometritis, systemic symptoms are more common than localized symptoms. On average, fevers began within 8 days after delivery.

More complicated and uncommon presentations may involve significant fever, general unwellness, sensitivity in the abdominal region, slowed intestinal activity, reduced blood pressure, and sepsis.

=== Laboratory findings ===
Blood tests commonly reveal an elevated white blood cell count, though it's important to note that such elevations can occur normally during labor and the early postpartum period without indicating infection.It should also be noted that as many as 10% of uncomplicated postpartum endometritis cases will feature clinically insignificant bacteremia. Thus, positive blood cultures do not necessarily indicate systemic infection.

== Types ==
=== Acute endometritis ===
There is very uncertain evidence supporting the use of prophylactic antibiotics to prevent endometritis after manual removal of the placenta in vaginal birth. Histologically, neutrophilic infiltration of the endometrial tissue is present during acute endometritis. The clinical presentation is typically high fever and purulent vaginal discharge. Menstruation after acute endometritis is excessive and, in uncomplicated cases, can resolve after 2 weeks of clindamycin and gentamicin IV antibiotic treatment.

In certain populations, it has been associated with Mycoplasma genitalium and pelvic inflammatory disease.

=== Chronic endometritis ===
Chronic endometritis is characterized by the presence of plasma cells in the stroma. Lymphocytes, eosinophils, and even lymphoid follicles may be seen, but in the absence of plasma cells, are not enough to warrant a histologic diagnosis. It may be seen in up to 10% of all endometrial biopsies performed for irregular bleeding. The most common organisms are Chlamydia trachomatis (chlamydia), Neisseria gonorrhoeae (gonorrhea), Streptococcus agalactiae (Group B Streptococcus), Mycoplasma hominis, tuberculosis, and various viruses. Most of these agents are capable of causing chronic pelvic inflammatory disease (PID). Patients with chronic endometritis may have an underlying cancer of the cervix or endometrium (although an infectious cause is more common). Antibiotic therapy is curative in most cases (depending on the underlying cause), with fairly rapid alleviation of symptoms after only 2 to 3 days. Women with chronic endometritis are also at a higher risk of pregnancy loss, and treatment for this improves future pregnancy outcomes.

Chronic granulomatous endometritis is usually caused by tuberculosis. The granulomas are small, sparse, and without caseation. The granulomas take up to 2 weeks to develop, and since the endometrium is shed every 4 weeks, the granulomas are poorly formed.

In human medicine, pyometra (also a veterinary condition of significance) is regarded as a form of chronic endometritis seen in elderly women, causing stenosis of the cervical os and accumulation of discharges and infection. Symptom in chronic endometritis is blood-stained discharge, but in pyometra, the patient complains of lower abdominal pain.

== Pyometra ==
Pyometra describes an accumulation of pus in the uterine cavity. For pyometra to develop, there must be both an infection and a blockage of the cervix. Signs and symptoms include lower abdominal pain (suprapubic), rigors, fever, and the discharge of pus on introduction of a sound into the uterus. Pyometra is treated with antibiotics, according to culture and sensitivity.

== See also ==
- Maternal death
- Puerperal fever
