= Jakob Kolletschka =

- Born: 24 July 1803; Bělá nad Svitavou, Bohemia
- Died: 13 March 1847 (aged 43); Vienna, Austrian Empire
- Known for: death by infection
- Scientific career
- Fields: Forensic medicine

Jakob Kolletschka (24 July 1803 – 13 March 1847) was a Czech-Austrian pathologist and forensic doctor. He was Professor of Forensic Medicine at Vienna General Hospital in Austria.

Jakob Kolletschka is mostly known for his death which eventually led Ignaz Semmelweis to his discovery of the etiology of childbed fever. Below is a quote from the original reference describing the details of his death.

In a lecture in 1846 he is reputed to have said, "It is here no uncommon thing for midwives, especially in the commencement of their practice, to pull off legs and arms of infants, and even to pull away the entire body and leave the head in the uterus. Such occurrences are not altogether uncommon; they often happen."

== Death ==
Semmelweis had left for Venice on 2 March 1847 to escape the many deaths at the Viennese maternity institution, which haunted him. He returned to Vienna on 20 March 1847.

I was immediately overwhelmed by the sad news that Professor [Jakob] Kolletschka, whom I greatly admired, had died in the interim.
The case history went as follows: Kolletschka, Professor of Forensic Medicine, often conducted autopsies for legal purposes in the company of students. During one such exercise, his finger was pricked by a student with the same knife that was being used in the autopsy. I do not recall which finger was cut. Professor Kolletschka contracted lymphangitis and phlebitis [inflammation of the lymphatic vessels and of the veins respectively] in the upper extremity. Then [...] he died of bilateral pleurisy, pericarditis, peritonitis, and meningitis [inflammation of the membranes of the lungs and thoracic cavity, of the fibroserous sac surrounding the heart, of the membranes of the abdomen and pelvic cavity, and of the membranes surrounding the brain, respectively]. A few days before he died, a metastasis also formed in one eye. I was still animated by the art treasures of Venice, but the news of Kolletschka's death agitated me still more. In this excited condition I could see clearly that the disease from which Kolletschka died was identical to that from which so many hundred maternity patients had also died. The maternity patients also had lymphangitis, peritonitis, pericarditis, pleurisy, and meningitis, and metastases also formed in many of them. Day and night I was haunted by the image of Kolletschka's disease and was forced to recognize, ever more decisively, that the disease from which Kolletschka died was identical to that from which so many maternity patients died.
