= Franz Kiwisch von Rotterau =

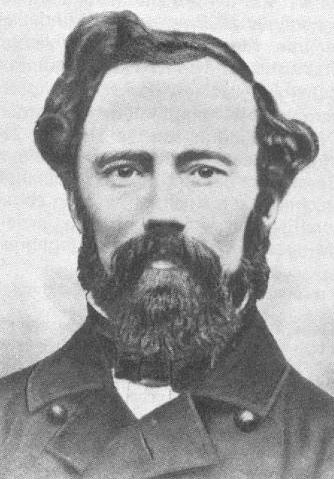
- Born: 30 April 1814; Klattau, Austrian Empire
- Died: 24 October 1852 (aged 38); Prague, Austrian Empire
- Known for: Obstetrics

Franz Kiwisch von Rotterau (30 April 1814 – 24 October 1852) was Professor of Obstetrics at the University of Würzburg and later at the University of Prague. He was one of Semmelweis's principal opponents. In Würzburg he was succeeded by Friedrich Wilhelm Scanzoni von Lichtenfels.

A native of Klattau in Bohemia, he earned his medical doctorate from Prague in 1837. Following the death of Josef Servas d'Outrepont (1775-1845) in 1845, he was appointed professor of OB/GYN at the University of Würzburg. In 1850 he succeeded Antonín Jan Jungmann (1775-1854) as professor of OB/GYN at the University of Prague. Not long afterwards he succumbed to the effects of tuberculosis, which resulted in his death at the age of 38.

His 1852 book, Klinische Vorträge (Clinical Lectures), was an influential scientific work in the field of gynaecology. Kiwisch was considered an excellent teacher by his students.

== Selected written works ==
- Conspectus morborum in clinico medico Pragensi primo semestri anni 1839 tractatorum; Doctoral dissertation (1837)
- Beiträge zur Geburtskunde; 2 booklets; (1846 and 1848)
- Klinische Vorträge über specielle Pathologie und Therapie der Krankheiten des weiblichen Geschlechtes (1852)
