= Iatrogenesis =

Causation of harm by any medical activity

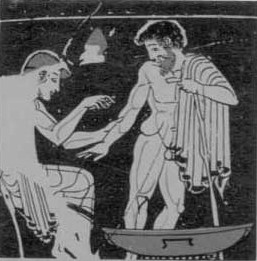
Ancient Greek painting in a vase, showing a physician (iatros) bleeding a patient

Iatrogenesis is the causation of a disease, a harmful complication, or other ill effect by any medical activity, including diagnosis, intervention, error, or negligence. First used in this sense in 1924, the term was introduced to sociology in 1976 by Ivan Illich, alleging that industrialized societies impair quality of life by overmedicalizing life. Iatrogenesis may thus include mental suffering via medical beliefs or a practitioner's statements. Some iatrogenic events are obvious, like amputation of the wrong limb, whereas others, like drug interactions, can evade recognition. In a 2013 estimate, about 20 million negative effects from treatment had occurred globally. In 2013, an estimated 142,000 persons died from adverse effects of medical treatment, up from an estimated 94,000 in 1990.

== Iatrogenic avenues ==
=== Risk associated with medical interventions ===
- Adverse effects of prescription drugs or vaccines
- Overuse of drugs (causing, for example, antibiotic resistance in bacteria)
- Prescription drug interaction
- Intentional disability for therapeutic effect (i.e., weakening the immune system to treat an autoimmune disorder or prevent organ transplant rejection, with immunosuppressants also possibly impairing normal immune function, including recovery from an infection or fighting cancer cells early)

=== Medical errors ===
- Incorrect prescription, perhaps due to illegible handwriting or computer typos
- Faulty procedures, techniques, information, methods, or equipment
- Negligence
- Hospital-acquired infections

== Causes and consequences ==
=== Medical error and negligence ===
Iatrogenic conditions need not result from medical errors, such as mistakes made in surgery, or the prescription or dispensing of the wrong therapy, such as a drug. In fact, intrinsic and sometimes adverse effects of a medical treatment are iatrogenic. For example, radiation therapy and chemotherapy—necessarily aggressive for therapeutic effect – frequently produce such iatrogenic effects as hair loss, hemolytic anemia, diabetes insipidus, vomiting, nausea, brain damage, lymphedema, infertility, etc. The loss of function resulting from the required removal of a diseased organ is iatrogenic, as in the case of diabetes consequential to the removal of all or part of the pancreas.

The incidence of iatrogenesis may be misleading in some cases. For example, a ruptured aortic aneurysm is fatal in most cases; the survival rate for treatment of a ruptured aortic aneurysm is under 25%. Patients who die during or after an operation will still be considered iatrogenic deaths, but the procedure itself remains a better bet than the probability of death if left untreated.

Other situations may involve actual negligence or faulty procedures, such as when pharmacotherapists produce handwritten prescriptions for drugs.

Another situation may involve negligence where patients are brushed off and not given proper care due to providers holding prejudice for reasons such as weight, gender, sexual orientation, ethnicity, religion, immigration status, etc. This can cause mistrust between patients and providers, leading to patients to not go in for treatment, resulting in more deaths.

=== Adverse effects ===
Adverse reactions, such as allergic reactions to drugs, even when unexpected by pharmacotherapists, are also classified as iatrogenic.

The evolution of antibiotic resistance in bacteria is iatrogenic as well. Bacterial strains resistant to antibiotics have evolved in response to the over prescription of antibiotic drugs.

Certain drugs and vaccines are toxic in their own right in therapeutic doses because of their mechanism of action. Alkylating antineoplastic agents, for example, cause DNA damage, which is more harmful to cancer cells than regular cells. However, alkylation causes severe side-effects and is actually carcinogenic in its own right, with potential to lead to the development of secondary tumors. In a similar manner, arsenic-based medications like melarsoprol, used to treat trypanosomiasis, can cause arsenic poisoning. Furthermore, aminoglycoside antibiotics can be toxic to the kidneys; these are prescribed only in severe infections where the risk of nephrotoxicity is preferable to the consequences of the infection.

Adverse effects can appear mechanically. The design of some surgical instruments may be decades old, hence certain adverse effects (such as tissue trauma) may never have been properly characterized.

=== Psychiatry ===
In psychiatry, iatrogenesis can occur due to misdiagnosis. This includes diagnosis with a false condition, as was the case of hystero-epilepsy. A potentially iatrogenic circumstance is misdiagnosis of bipolar disorder for another disorder, especially in pediatric patients considered to have major depressive disorder and prescribed stimulants or antidepressants. Other conditions such as somatoform disorder are theorized to have significant sociocultural and iatrogenic components. Chronic Fatigue Syndrome/Myalgic Encephalomyelitis was historically viewed as a psychiatric/somatoform condition, and the now-outdated treatment of Graded Exercise Therapy is known to have caused iatrogenic harm. Likewise, many neurological conditions, including multiple sclerosis, are frequently misdiagnosed as functional neurologic disorder, a diagnosis tied to several pathways of iatrogenic harm including stigma, dismissal of patients' own experience, disregard of genuine neurological disorders, and even direct harm from interactions with clinicians.

Post-traumatic stress disorder is hypothesized to be prone to iatrogenic complications based on treatment modality. Certain antipsychotics have been shown to reduce brain volumes in animals and in humans over long-term use. Some populations may be at risk of misdiagnosis, including those identified as having substance abuse disorders. At the other end of the spectrum, dissociative identity disorder is considered by a minority of theorists to be a wholly iatrogenic disorder with the bulk of diagnoses arising from a tiny fraction of practitioners.

The degree of association of any particular condition with iatrogenesis is unclear and in some cases controversial. The over-diagnosis of psychiatric conditions (with the assignment of mental illness terminology) may relate primarily to clinician dependence on subjective criteria. The assignment of pathological nomenclature is rarely a benign process and can easily rise to the level of emotional iatrogenesis, especially when no alternatives outside of the diagnostic naming process have been considered. Many former patients come to the conclusion that their difficulties are largely the result of the power relationships inherent in psychiatric treatment, which has led to the rise of the anti-psychiatry movement.

=== Iatrogenic poverty ===
Meessen et al. used the term "iatrogenic poverty" to describe impoverishment induced by medical care. Impoverishment is described for households exposed to catastrophic health expenditure or to hardship financing. Every year, worldwide, over 100,000 households fall into poverty due to health care expenses. A study reported that in the United States in 2001, illness and medical debt caused half of all personal bankruptcies. Especially in countries in economic transition, the willingness to pay for health care is increasing, and the supply side does not stay behind and develops very fast. But the regulatory and protective capacity in those countries is often lagging behind. Patients easily fall into a cycle of illness, ineffective therapies, consumption of savings, indebtedness, sale of productive assets, and eventually poverty.

=== Social and cultural iatrogenesis ===
The 20th-century social critic Ivan Illich broadened the concept of medical iatrogenesis in his 1974 book Medical Nemesis: The Expropriation of Health by defining it at three levels.

- First, clinical iatrogenesis is the injury done to patients by ineffective, unsafe, and erroneous treatments as described above. In this regard, he described the need for evidence-based medicine 20 years before the term was coined (the concept itself had been known and followed for centuries).
- Second, at another level social iatrogenesis is the medicalization of life in which medical professionals, pharmaceutical companies, and medical device companies have a vested interest in sponsoring sickness by creating unrealistic health demands that require more treatments or treating non-diseases that are part of the normal human experience, such as age-related declines. In this way, aspects of medical practice and medical industries can produce social harm in which society members ultimately become less healthy or excessively dependent on institutional care. He argued that medical education of physicians contributes to medicalization of society because they are trained predominantly for diagnosing and treating illness, therefore they focus on disease rather than on health. Iatrogenic poverty (above) can be considered a specific manifestation of social iatrogenesis.
- Third, cultural iatrogenesis refers to the destruction of traditional ways of dealing with, and making sense of, death, suffering, and sickness. In this way the medicalization of life leads to cultural harm as society members lose their autonomous coping skills. In these critiques "Illich does not reject all benefits of modern society but rejects those that involve unwarranted dependency and exploitation."

== Epidemiology ==
Globally it is estimated that 142,000 people died in 2013 from adverse effects of medical treatment, an increase of 51 percent from 94,000 in 1990. In the United States, estimated deaths per year include:

- 12,000 due to unnecessary surgery
- 7,000 due to medication errors in hospitals
- 20,000 due to other errors in hospitals
- 80,000 due to nosocomial infections in hospitals
- 106,000 due to non-error, negative effects of drugs

Based on these figures, iatrogenesis may cause as many as 225,000 deaths per year in the United States (excluding recognizable error). An earlier Institute of Medicine report estimated 230,000 to 284,000 iatrogenic deaths annually.

== History ==
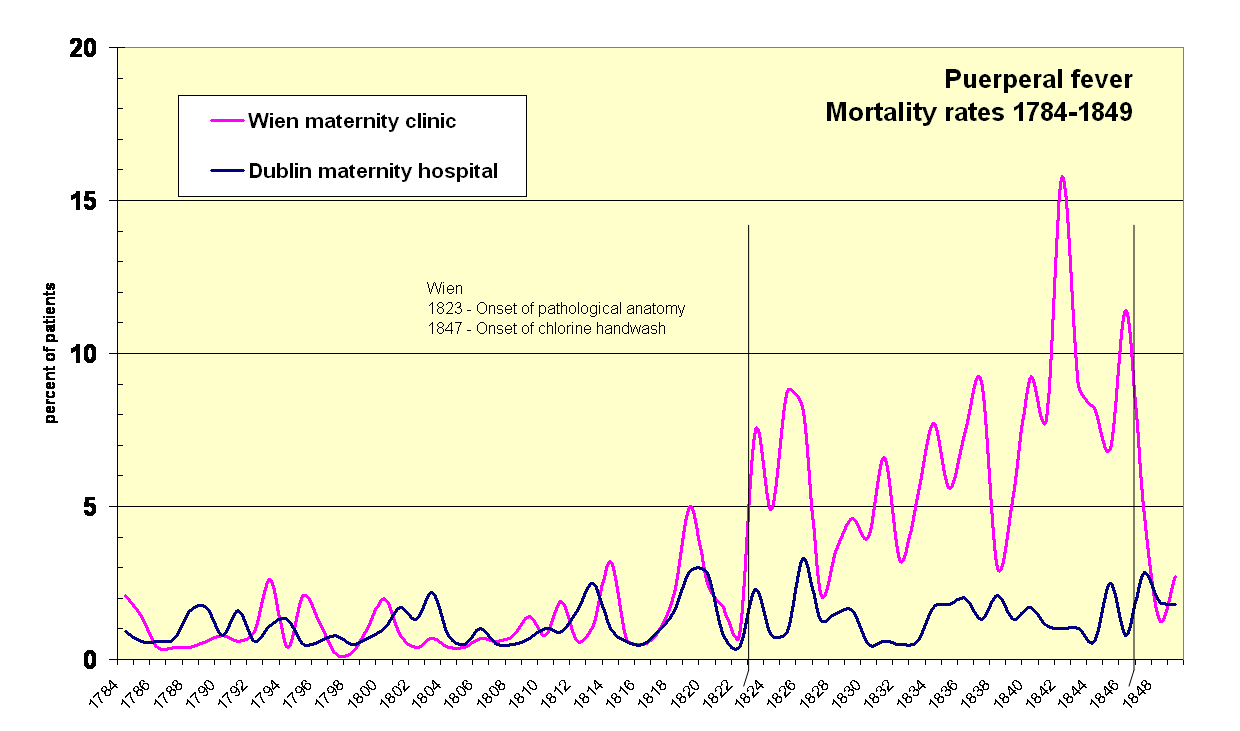
Evidence demonstrating the advent of pathological anatomy in 1823 Vienna (left vertical line) correlated with incidence of fatal childbed fever. The onset of chlorine handwash in 1847 is noted (right vertical line). For comparison, rates for Dublin maternity hospital, which had no pathological anatomy (view rates). Semmelweis 1861.

The term iatrogenesis means 'brought forth by a healer', from the Greek iatros (ἰατρός, 'healer') and genesis (γένεσις, 'origin'); as such, in its earlier forms, it could refer to good or bad effects.

Since at least the time of Hippocrates, people have recognized the potentially damaging effects of medical intervention. "First do no harm" (primum non nocere) is a primary Hippocratic mandate in modern medical ethics. Iatrogenic illness or death caused purposefully or by avoidable error or negligence on the healer's part became a punishable offense in many civilizations.

The transfer of pathogens from the autopsy room to maternity patients, leading to shocking historical mortality rates of puerperal fever (also known as "childbed fever") at maternity institutions in the 19th century, was a major iatrogenic catastrophe of the era. The infection mechanism was first identified by Ignaz Semmelweis.

With the development of scientific medicine in the 20th century, it could be expected that iatrogenic illness or death might be more easily avoided. Antiseptics, anesthesia, antibiotics, better surgical techniques, evidence-based protocols and best practices continue to be developed to decrease iatrogenic side effects and mortality.

== See also ==
- Adverse drug reaction
- Antifragile
- Bioethics
- Bloodletting
- Cascade effect
- Classification of Pharmaco-Therapeutic Referrals
- Fatal Care: Survive in the U.S. Health System
- Hospital-acquired infection
- Journal of Negative Results in Biomedicine
- List of medicine contamination incidents
- Medical malpractice
- Medicalization
- Nassim Nicholas Taleb
- Nocebo
- Paradoxical reaction
- Patient safety
- Placebo
- Polypharmacy
- Pressure ulcer
- Quaternary prevention
- Risk–benefit ratio
- Sentinel event
