= Gustav Scanzoni von Lichtenfels =

German general (1855–1924)

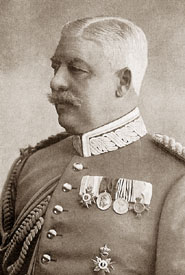
- Born: March 13, 1855; Würzburg, Lower Franconia, Bavaria
- Died: March 12, 1924 (aged 68); Munich, Bavaria, Germany
- Spouse: Emilie Lederer (m. 1882)
- Military career
- Allegiance: Germany
- Branch: Imperial German Army
- Service years: 1875–1911; 1914–1917
- Rank: General of the Artillery
- Conflicts: World War I: Second Battle of Artois 1915; Second Battle of Artois; Autumn battles, Champagne and Artois 1915; Third Battle of Artois; Somme Offensive; Attack at Fromelles

Gustav Leofried Ignaz Scanzoni von Lichtenfels (1855–1924) was a German General of the Artillery of World War I. He is known for conducting the Attack at Fromelles but was relieved before the war concluded.

== Family ==
Gustav was born as the son of the professor of obstetrics at the University of Würzburg, Friedrich Wilhelm Scanzoni von Lichtenfels and his wife Auguste (née Höniger) (1826–1891). His father was elevated to the hereditary Bavarian nobility on June 19, 1863, by King Maximilian II of Bavaria as "Scanzoni von Lichtenfels". Gustav later married Emilie Lederer (b. 1858) on March 4, 1882, in Würzburg. They had one son, Albert Scanzoni von Lichtenfels (1885–1960) who was a painter and writer.

== Initial military career ==
After attending the Humanistisches Gymnasium, Scanzoni von Lichtenfels enlisted in the Royal Bavarian 2nd Field Artillery Regiment "Horn" on October 1, 1875, as a Dreijährig-Freiwilliger. He was promoted to second lieutenant by the end of November 1877 and served as adjutant to the cavalry detachment from November 1881 to October 1885. Scanzoni then graduated from the War Academy in Munich which made him a qualifier for the General Staff, the highest adjutant position and as a military teacher. He was promoted to First Lieutenant in November 1887 and to Captain/Battery Chief on November 21, 1890. At the end of April 1894, he was appointed adjutant to the General Command of the II Royal Bavarian Corps. With his promotion to Major, Scanzoni von Lichtenfels served at the Central Office of the General Staff from November 20, 1897, to March 31, 1900, and was then transferred to the General Staff of the II Royal Bavarian Corps. From the beginning of October 1901, this was followed by employment as a department commander in the 4th Field Artillery Regiment "König". Scanzoni von Lichtenfels was promoted to Lieutenant Colonel in mid-July 1902, became regimental commander on March 9, 1904, and promoted to Colonel at the end of October 1904. From May 19, 1906, he was commander of the 6th Field Artillery Brigade in Nuremberg and was promoted to Generalmajor in early March 1907. With his promotion to Generalleutnant, Scanzoni was placed on a pension in approval of his resignation request on April 23, 1911. On the occasion of his farewell, Prince Regent Luitpold honored him on behalf of the King with the Commander of the Military Merit Order.

== World War I ==
After the German entry into World War I, Scanzoni von Lichtenfels re-enlisted as officer with a temporary pension and given command of the 6th Reserve Division on the Western Front on December 24, 1914, which was engaged in trench warfare in Flanders and Artois. He received the patent for his rank on January 11, 1915. In mid-1915, Scanzoni was involved in the Second Battle of Artois. On September 25, 1915, during the Third Battle of Artois, parts of the British 8th Division broke against the right wing of his division after blasting mines and reached the second German line of defense but was repelled by a Gegenstoẞ (improvised counter-attack). After his participation in the Attack at Fromelles during the 1916 Battle of the Somme in October 1916, he received his promotion of General of the Artillery on November 14, 1916, and was relieved of his position as divisional commander on January 13, 1917. For his service during the war, he earned both classes of the Iron Cross, the Military Order of Merit, First Class with Swords and on May 12, 1917, the Star of the Order of the Red Eagle, II class with swords.
