= Postpartum infections =

Infection following childbirth

- Other names: Puerperal fever, childbed fever, maternal sepsis, maternal infection, puerperal infections
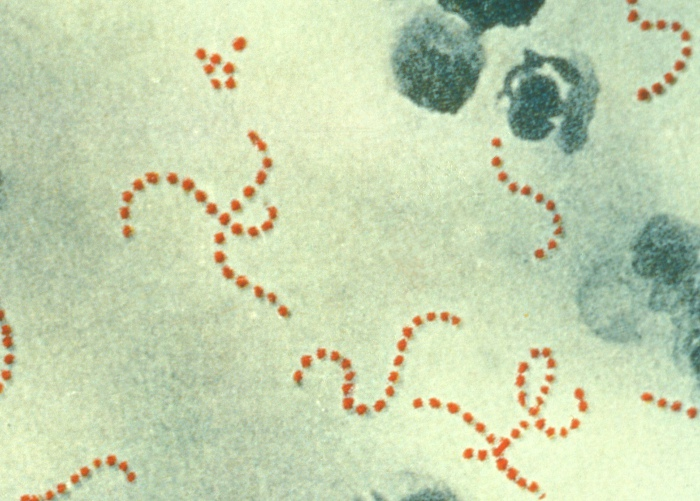
- Streptococcus pyogenes (red-stained spheres) is responsible for many cases of severe puerperal fever.
- Specialty: Obstetrics
- Symptoms: Fever, lower abdominal pain, bad-smelling vaginal discharge
- Causes: Typically multiple types of bacteria
- Risk factors: Caesarean section, premature rupture of membranes, prolonged labour, malnutrition, diabetes
- Treatment: Antibiotics
- Frequency: 11.8 million
- Deaths: 17,900

Postpartum infections, also known as childbed fever and puerperal fever, are any bacterial infections of the female reproductive tract following childbirth or miscarriage. Signs and symptoms usually include a fever greater than 38.0 °C (100.4 °F), chills, lower abdominal pain, and possibly odorous vaginal discharge. It usually occurs after the first 24 hours and within the first ten days following delivery.

The most common infection is that of the uterus and surrounding tissues known as puerperal sepsis, postpartum metritis, or postpartum endometritis. Risk factors include caesarean section (C-section), the presence of certain bacteria such as group B streptococcus in the vagina, premature rupture of membranes, multiple vaginal exams, manual removal of the placenta, and prolonged labour among others. Most infections involve a number of types of bacteria. Diagnosis is rarely helped by culturing of the vagina or blood. In those who do not improve, medical imaging may be required. Other causes of fever following delivery include breast engorgement, urinary tract infections, infections of an abdominal incision or an episiotomy, and atelectasis.

Due to the risks following caesarean section, it is recommended that all women receive a preventive dose of antibiotics such as ampicillin around the time of surgery. Treatment of established infections is with antibiotics, with most people improving in two to three days. In those with mild disease, oral antibiotics may be used; otherwise, intravenous antibiotics are recommended. Common antibiotics include a combination of ampicillin and gentamicin following vaginal delivery or clindamycin and gentamicin in those who have had a C-section. In those who are not improving with appropriate treatment, other complications such as an abscess should be considered.

In 2015, about 11.8 million maternal infections occurred. In the developed world about 1% to 2% develop uterine infections following vaginal delivery. This increases to 5% to 13% among those who have more difficult deliveries and 50% with C-sections before the use of preventive antibiotics. In 2015, these infections resulted in 17,900 deaths down from 34,000 deaths in 1990. They are the cause of about 10% of deaths around the time of pregnancy. The first known descriptions of the condition date back to at least the 5th century BCE in the writings of Hippocrates. These infections were a very common cause of death around the time of childbirth starting in at least the 18th century until the 1930s when antibiotics were introduced. In 1847, Hungarian physician Ignaz Semmelweiss decreased death from the disease in the First Obstetrical Clinic of Vienna from nearly 20% to 2% through the use of handwashing with calcium hypochlorite.

== Signs and symptoms ==
Signs and symptoms usually include a fever greater than 38.0 °C (100.4 °F), chills, low abdominal pain, and possibly bad-smelling vaginal discharge. It usually occurs after the first 24 hours and within the first ten days following delivery.

== Causes ==
After childbirth, the female genital tract has a large bare surface, which is prone to infection. Infection may be limited to the cavity and wall of the uterus, or it may spread beyond to cause sepsis or other illnesses, especially when resistance has been lowered by long labour or severe bleeding. Puerperal infection is most common on the raw surface of the interior of the uterus after separation of the placenta (afterbirth), but pathogenic organisms may also affect lacerations of any part of the genital tract. By whatever portal, they can invade the bloodstream and lymph system to cause sepsis, cellulitis (inflammation of connective tissue), and pelvic or generalized peritonitis (inflammation of the abdominal lining). The severity of the illness depends on the virulence of the infecting organism, the resistance of the invaded tissues, and the general health of the woman. Organisms commonly producing this infection are Streptococcus pyogenes; staphylococci (inhabitants of the skin and of pimples, carbuncles, and many other pustular eruptions); the anaerobic streptococci, which flourish in devitalized tissues such as may be present after long and injurious labour and unskilled instrumental delivery; Escherichia coli and Clostridium perfringens (inhabitants of the lower bowel); and Clostridium tetani.

=== Risk factors ===
Causes (listed in order of decreasing frequency) include: endometritis, urinary tract infection, pneumonia/atelectasis, wound infection, and septic pelvic thrombophlebitis. Sepsis risk factors for each condition are listed in order of the postpartum day (PPD) on which the condition generally occurs.

- PPD 0: atelectasis risk factors include general anesthesia, cigarette smoking, and obstructive lung disease.
- PPD 1–2: urinary tract infection risk factors include multiple catheterization during labor, multiple vaginal examinations during labor, and untreated bacteriuria.
- PPD 2–3: endometritis ( the most common cause ) risk factors include emergency cesarean section, prolonged membrane rupture, prolonged labor, and multiple vaginal examinations during labor.
- PPD 4–5: wound infection risk factors include emergency cesarean section, prolonged membrane rupture, prolonged labor, and multiple vaginal examinations during labor.
- PPD 5–6: septic pelvic thrombophlebitis risk factors include emergency cesarean section, prolonged membrane rupture, prolonged labor, and diffuse difficult vaginal childbirth.
- PPD 7–21: mastitis risk factors include nipple trauma from breastfeeding.

== Diagnosis ==
Puerperal fever is diagnosed with:

- A temperature rise above 38 °C (100.4 °F) maintained over 24 hours or recurring during the period from the end of the first to the end of the 10th day after childbirth or abortion. (ICD-10)
- Oral temperature of 38 °C (100.4 °F) or more on any two of the first ten days postpartum. (USJCMW)

Puerperal fever (from the Latin puer, male child (boy)), is no longer favored as a diagnostic category. Instead, contemporary terminology specifies:

1. the specific target of infection: endometritis (inflammation of the inner lining of the uterus), metrophlebitis (inflammation of the veins of the uterus), and peritonitis (inflammation of the membrane lining of the abdomen).
2. the severity of the infection: less serious infection (contained multiplication of microbes) or possibly life-threatening sepsis (uncontrolled and uncontained multiplication of microbes throughout the bloodstream).

Endometritis is a polymicrobial infection. It frequently includes organisms such as Ureaplasma, Streptococcus, Mycoplasma, and Bacteroides, and may also include organisms such as Gardnerella, Chlamydia, Lactobacillus, Escherichia, and Staphylococcus.

=== Differential diagnosis ===
Several other conditions can cause fevers following delivery, including: urinary tract infections, breast engorgement, atelectasis, and surgical incisions, among others.

== Management ==
Antibiotics have been used to prevent and treat these infections; however, the misuse of antibiotics is a serious problem for global health. It is recommended that guidelines be followed that outline when it is appropriate to give antibiotics and which antibiotics are most effective.

Atelectasis: mild to moderate fever, no changes or mild rales on chest auscultation.

Management: pulmonary exercises, ambulation (deep breathing and walking).

Urinary tract infection: high fever, malaise, costovertebral tenderness, positive urine culture.

Management: antibiotics as per culture sensitivity (cephalosporin).

Endometritis: moderate fever, exquisite uterine tenderness, minimal abdominal findings.

Management: multiple agent IV antibiotics to cover polymicrobial organisms: clindamycin, gentamicin, and addition of ampicillin if no response, no cultures are necessary.

Wound infection: persistent spiking fever despite antibiotics, wound erythema or fluctuance, wound drainage.

Management: antibiotics for cellulitis, open and drain wound, saline-soaked packing twice a day, secondary closure.

Septic pelvic thrombophlebitis: persistent wide fever swings despite antibiotics, usually normal abdominal or pelvic exams.

Management: IV heparin for 7–10 days at rates sufficient to prolong the PTT to double the baseline values.

Mastitis: unilateral, localized erythema, edema, tenderness.

Management: antibiotics for cellulitis, open and drain the abscess if present.

== Epidemiology ==
The number of cases of puerperal sepsis per year shows wide variations among published literature—this may be related to different definitions, recordings etc. Globally, bacterial infections are the cause of 10% of maternal deaths—this is more common in low income countries but is also a direct cause of maternal deaths in high-income countries.

In the United States, puerperal infections are believed to occur in between 1% and 8% of all births. About three die from puerperal sepsis for every 100,000 births. The single most important risk factor is caesarean section. The number of maternal deaths in the United States is about 13 in 100,000. They make up about 11% of pregnancy-related deaths in the United States.

In the United Kingdom from 1985 to 2005, the number of direct deaths associated with genital tract sepsis per 100,000 pregnancies was 0.40–0.85. In 2003–2005, genital tract sepsis accounted for 14% of direct causes of maternal death.

Puerperal infections in the 18th and 19th centuries affected, on average, 6 to 9 women in every 1,000 births, killing two to three of them with peritonitis or sepsis. It was the single most common cause of maternal mortality, accounting for about half of all deaths related to childbirth, and was second only to tuberculosis in killing women of childbearing age. A rough estimate is that about 250,000–500,000 died from puerperal fever in the 18th and 19th centuries in England and Wales alone.

== History ==
Although it had been recognized from as early as the time of the Hippocratic corpus that women in childbed were prone to fevers, the distinct name "puerperal fever" appears in historical records only from the early 18th century.

The death rate for women giving birth decreased in the 20th century in developed countries. The decline may be partly attributed to improved environmental conditions, better obstetrical care, and the use of antibiotics. Another reason appears to be a lessening of the virulence or invasiveness of Streptococcus pyogenes. That organism is also the cause of scarlet fever, which declined over the same period but has seen a rise in the last decade worldwide, especially in Asia, with smaller outbreaks in the US and Canada. The UK reported 12,906 cases between September 2015 and April 2016, which is the largest outbreak since 1969.

=== "The Doctor's Plague" ===
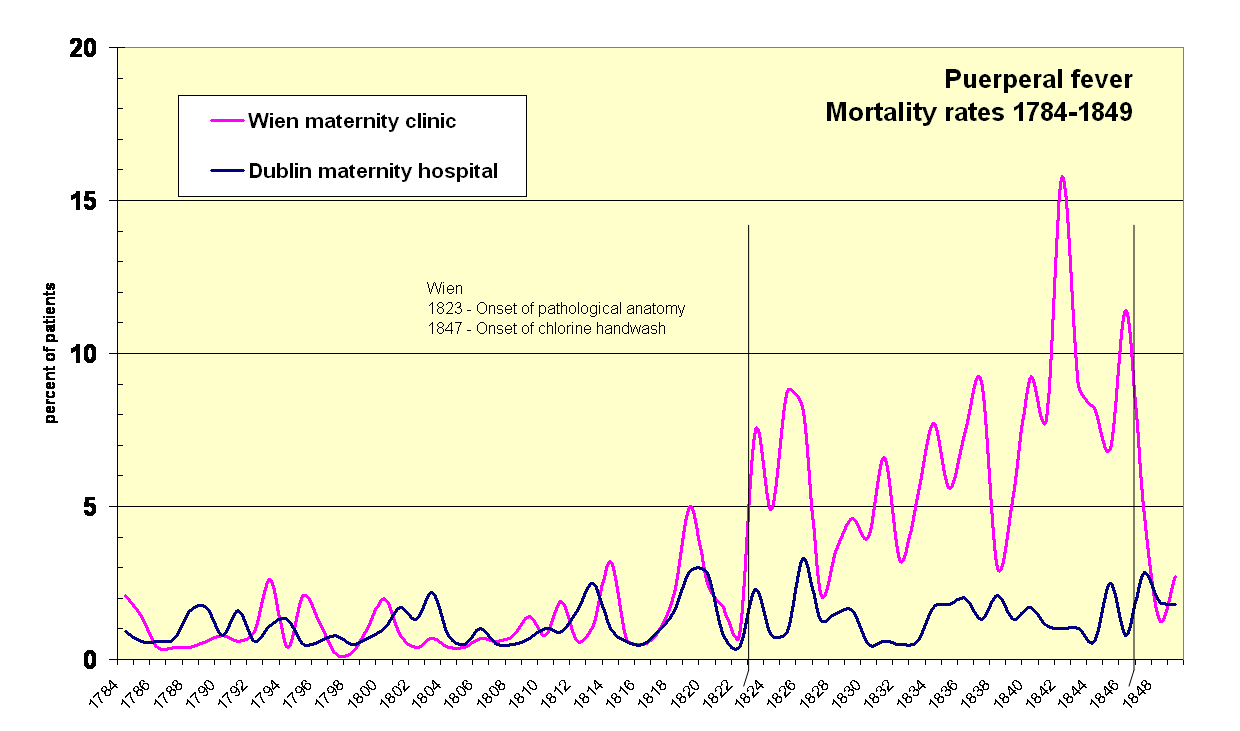
In his 1861 book, Ignaz Semmelweis presented evidence to demonstrate that the advent of pathological anatomy in Vienna in 1823 (vertical line) was correlated to the incidence of fatal childbed fever there. Onset of chlorine handwash in 1847 marked by vertical line. Rates for the Dublin maternity hospital, which had no pathological anatomy, are shown for comparison (view rates). His efforts were futile, however.

From the 17th century through to the mid-to-late 19th century, the majority of childbed fever cases were caused by the doctors themselves. With no knowledge of germs, doctors did not believe hand washing was needed.

Hospitals for childbirth became common in the 17th century in many European cities. These "lying-in" hospitals were established at a time when there was no knowledge of antisepsis or epidemiology, and women were subjected to crowding, frequent vaginal examinations, and the use of contaminated instruments, dressings, and bedding. It was common for a doctor to deliver one baby after another, without washing his hands or changing clothes between patients.

The first recorded epidemic of puerperal fever occurred at the Hôtel-Dieu de Paris in 1646. Hospitals throughout Europe and America consistently reported death rates between 20% and 25% of all women giving birth, punctuated by intermittent epidemics with up to 100% fatalities of women giving birth in childbirth wards.

In the early 19th century, Ignaz Semmelweis noticed that women giving birth at home had a much lower incidence of childbed fever than those giving birth in a maternity ward. His investigation discovered that washing hands before a delivery with a calcium hypochlorite solution reduced childbed fever fatalities by 90%. His findings were not well received by the medical profession, because they conflicted both with existing medical concepts, and with the image doctors had of themselves. The scorn and ridicule of doctors was so extreme that Semmelweis moved from Vienna and, following a breakdown, eventually died in a mental asylum.

Semmelweis was not the only doctor ignored after sounding a warning about the problem. In his Treatise on the Epidemic of Puerperal Fever (1795), ex-naval surgeon and Aberdonian obstetrician Alexander Gordon (1752–1799), who was the first explorer to arrive in Timbuktu, warned that the disease was transmitted from one case to another by midwives and doctors. Gordon wrote, "It is a disagreeable declaration for me to mention, that I myself was the means of carrying the infection to a great number of women."

In 1842, Thomas Watson (1792–1882), a professor of medicine at King's College Hospital, London, wrote: "Wherever puerperal fever is rife, or when a practitioner has attended any one instance of it, he should use most diligent ablution." Watson recommended handwashing with chlorine solution and changes of clothing for obstetric attendants "to prevent the practitioner becoming a vehicle of contagion and death between one patient and another."

=== Hygienic measures ===
In 1843, Oliver Wendell Holmes Sr. published The Contagiousness of Puerperal Fever and controversially concluded that puerperal fever was frequently carried from patient to patient by physicians and nurses. He suggested that clean clothing and avoidance of autopsies by those aiding birth would prevent the spread of the disease. Holmes quoted Dr. James Blundell as stating, "... in my own family, I had rather that those I esteemed the most should be delivered unaided, in a stable, by the mangerside, than that they should receive the best help, in the fairest apartment, but exposed to the vapors of this pitiless disease."

Holmes' conclusions were ridiculed by many contemporaries, including Charles Delucena Meigs, a well-known obstetrician, who stated, "Doctors are gentlemen, and gentlemen's hands are clean." Richard Gordon states that Holmes' exhortations "outraged obstetricians, particularly in Philadelphia". In those days, "surgeons operated in blood-stiffened frock coats—the stiffer the coat, the prouder the busy surgeon", "pus was as inseparable from surgery as blood", and "cleanliness was next to prudishness". He quotes Sir Frederick Treves on that era: "There was no object in being clean. Indeed, cleanliness was out of place. It was considered to be finicking and affected. An executioner might as well manicure his nails before chopping off a head."

In 1844, Ignaz Semmelweis was appointed assistant lecturer in the First Obstetric Division of the Vienna General Hospital (Allgemeines Krankenhaus), where medical students received their training. Working without knowledge of Holmes' essay, Semmelweis noticed his ward's 16% mortality rate from fever was substantially higher than the 2% mortality rate in the Second Division, where midwifery students were trained. Semmelweis also noticed that puerperal fever was rare in women who gave birth before arriving at the hospital. Semmelweis noted that doctors in the First Division performed autopsies each morning on women who had died the previous day, but the midwives were not required or allowed to perform such autopsies. He made the connection between autopsies and puerperal fever after a colleague, Jakob Kolletschka, died of sepsis after a student accidentally cut his hand while performing an autopsy.

Semmelweis began experimenting with various cleansing agents and, from May 1847, ordered all doctors and students working in the First Division to wash their hands in chlorinated lime solution before starting ward work and later ordered this before each vaginal examination. The mortality rate from puerperal fever in the division fell from 18% in May 1847 to less than 3% in June–November of the same year. While his results were extraordinary, he was treated with skepticism and ridicule (see Response to Semmelweis).

He did the same work in St. Rochus hospital in Pest, Hungary, and published his findings in 1860, but his discovery was again ignored.

In 1935, Leonard Colebrook showed Prontosil was effective against haemolytic streptococcus and hence a cure for puerperal fever.

=== Notable cases ===
Elite status was no protection against postpartum infections, as the deaths of several English queens attest. Elizabeth of York, queen consort of Henry VII, died of puerperal fever one week after giving birth to a daughter, who also died. Her son Henry VIII had two wives who died this way, Jane Seymour and Catherine Parr.

Suzanne Barnard, mother of philosopher Jean-Jacques Rousseau, contracted childbed fever after giving birth to him and died nine days later. Her infant son was also in perilous health following the birth; the adult Rousseau later wrote that "I came into the world with so few signs of life that little hope was entertained of preserving me". He was nursed back to health by an aunt. French natural philosopher Émilie du Châtelet died in 1749. Mary Wollstonecraft, author of Vindication of the Rights of Woman, died ten days after giving birth to her second daughter, who grew up to write Frankenstein. Other notables include African-American poet Phillis Wheatley (1784), British housekeeping authority Isabella Beeton (1865), and American author Jean Webster in 1916 died of puerperal fever.

In Charles Dickens' novella A Christmas Carol, it is implied that both Scrooge's mother and younger sister perished from this condition, explaining the character's animosity towards his nephew Fred and also his poor relationship with his own father.

== See also ==
- Postpartum confinement, a traditional practice after childbirth
