= Friedrich Wilhelm Scanzoni von Lichtenfels =

German gynecologist and obstetrician

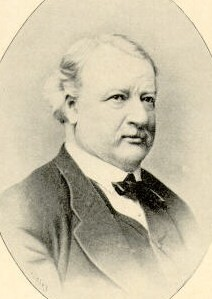
Friedrich Wilhelm Scanzoni von Lichtenfels

Friedrich Wilhelm Scanzoni von Lichtenfels (21 December 1821 – 12 June 1891) was a German gynecologist and obstetrician.

== Life ==
Scanzoni was born in Prague in Bohemia, Austrian Empire. He studied medicine in Prague and spent most of his professional career as chair of obstetrics (1850–1888) at the University of Würzburg, where he succeeded Franz Kiwisch von Rotterau.

Scanzoni was a leading authority of obstetrics in 19th-century Europe. He is best remembered today for the birthing procedure known as the "Scanzoni maneuver". In 1849 he was a major factor in the appointment of Rudolf Virchow to the chair of pathological anatomy at the University of Würzburg. He was an ardent critic of Ignaz Semmelweis. However, in later years, he became convinced Semmelweis was correct, even if he did not like to admit it.

== Associated eponyms ==
- "Scanzoni maneuver": (Scanzoni forceps technique) A method of applying an obstetrical forceps in order to rotate a fetus.
- "Scanzoni's second os": (pathologic retraction ring) A constriction at the junction of the thinned lower uterine segment with the thick retracted upper uterine segment. This condition results from obstructed labor, and is a sign of threatened rupture of the uterus.

== Selected writings ==
- Die geburtshilflichen Operationen (The obstetrical operation), 1852.
- Beiträge zur Geburtskunde und Gynäkologie (Contribution to obstetrics and gynecology), seven volumes (1854–73).
- Die Krankheiten der weiblichen Brüste und Harnwerkzeuge, second edition 1859.
- Kompendium der Geburtshilfe (Compendium of midwifery), second edition 1861.
- Die chronische Metritis (Chronic metritis), 1863.
- Lehrbuch für Geburtshilfe (Textbook for obstetrics), fourth edition 1867.
- Lehrbuch der Krankheiten der weiblichen Sexualorgane (Textbook on diseases of the female sex organs), fifth edition 1875.

== See also ==
- Gustav Scanzoni von Lichtenfels, his son
