= Chiari syndrome =

Chiari syndrome or Chiari's disease may refer to one of the following diseases named after the 19th century Austrian pathologist Hans Chiari:

- Arnold–Chiari malformation, or simply "Chiari malformation", a malformation of the brain
- Budd–Chiari syndrome, a disease with typical symptoms of abdominal pain, ascites and hepatomegaly caused by occlusion of the hepatic veins
- Chiari–Frommel syndrome, an older term for hyperprolactinaemia with extended postpartum galactorrhea and amenorrhea
