= Gustav von Bunge =

German physiologist (1844–1920)

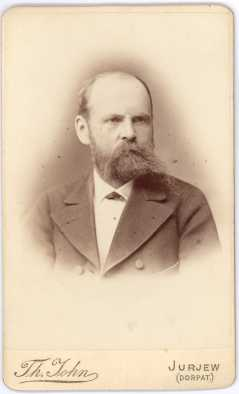
- Born: 19 January 1844; Dorpat, Russian Empire
- Died: 5 November 1920 (aged 76); Basel, Switzerland
- Education: Imperial University of Dorpat; University of Leipzig
- Known for: Research regarding alcoholism
- Scientific career
- Fields: Physiological chemistry
- Workplaces: University of Basel
- Notable students: Hans Hunziker

Gustav Piers Alexander von Bunge (19 January 1844 – 5 November 1920) was a Baltic German physiologist and physiological chemist, known for his work on the metabolism of mineral salts and iron, on the composition of milk, and for his advocacy of total abstinence from alcohol.

== Biography ==
Bunge was born on 19 January 1844 in Dorpat, Russian Empire (now Tartu, Estonia), the son of Alexander von Bunge, a botanist, and Elisabeth Karolina von Pistohlkors. He studied chemistry and mathematics at the Imperial University of Dorpat, where he obtained a doctorate and habilitation in physiology in 1874. Bunge then studied in Strasbourg and obtained a doctorate in medicine at the University of Leipzig in 1882. At Dorpat, he had as instructors Friedrich Bidder (1810–1894) and Carl Schmidt (1822–1894). In 1885, Bunge became an associate professor, and from 1886 until his death in 1920, he served as a professor of physiological chemistry at the University of Basel.

Among his more important studies were the interplay of potassium and sodium within the body; the association of sodium chloride with metabolism, and analytic studies of iron metabolism.

Bunge was the author of treatises on alcoholic spirits, of which he denounced as a "threat to health and heredity". His name is associated with "Bunge's rule", a nutritional law based on his research of human and animal milk – "that nutrients in milk are proportional to the growth of the offspring". Feeding experiments carried out in his laboratory by his student Nikolai Lunin, published in 1881, are regarded as an early step towards the discovery of vitamins, but Bunge did not accept Lunin's conclusion that natural foods contain small quantities of unknown substances essential to life. He died on 5 November 1920 in Basel, aged 76.

== Selected publications ==
- Der Vegetarianismus (Berlin, 1885; 2nd ed., 1900)
- The Alcohol Question, 1886.
- Text-Book of Physiological and Pathological Chemistry, (translated from the fourth German edition by Florence A. Starling and edited by Ernest H. Starling, 1902).
- Alcoholic Poisoning and Degeneration, 1905.
- "Text-book of organic chemistry for medical students", 1907.
