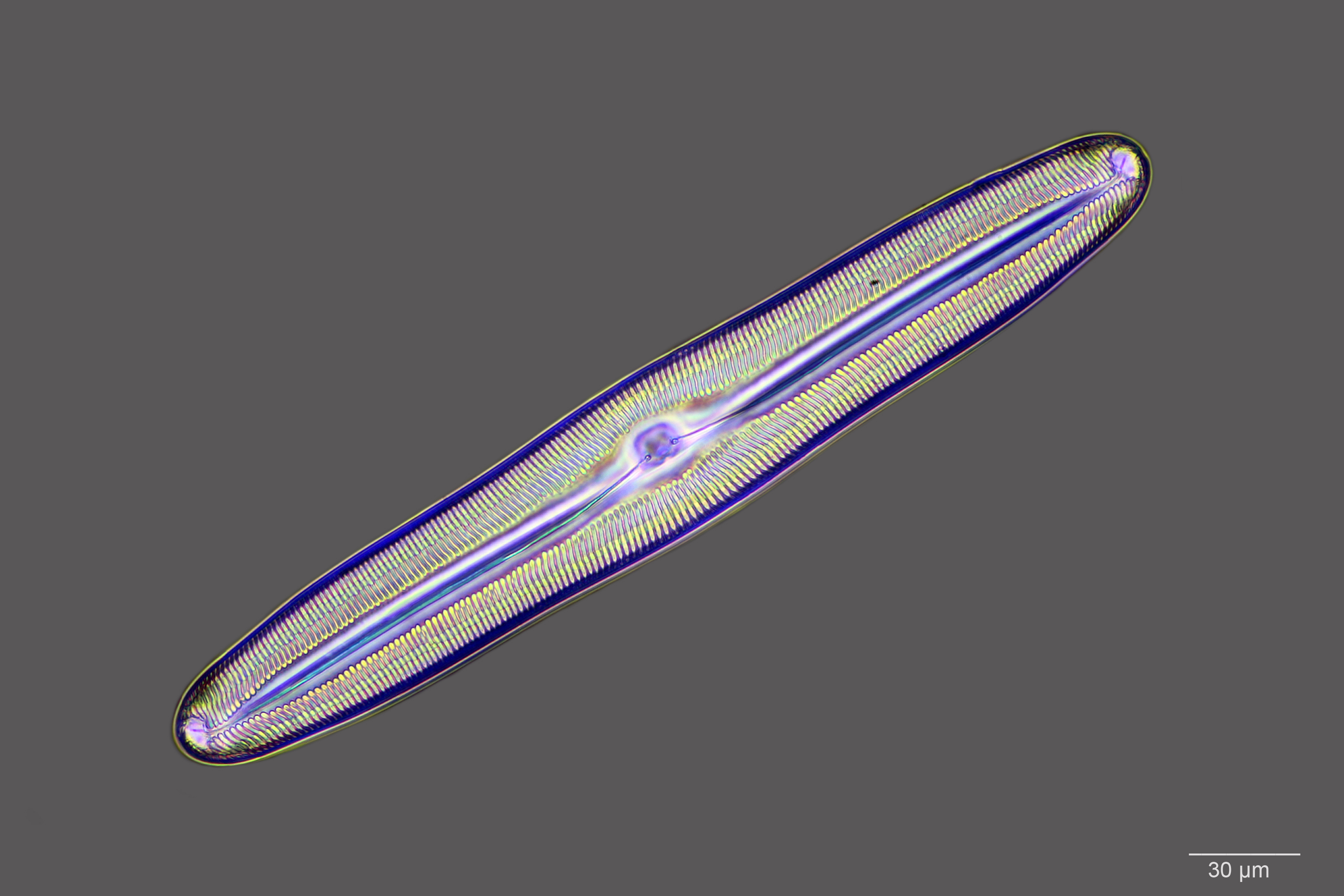
- Pinnularia major, specimen length 0.3 mm

Scientific classification
- Domain: Eukaryota
- Clade: Sar
- Clade: Stramenopiles
- Division: Ochrophyta
- Clade: Diatomeae
- Class: Bacillariophyceae
- Order: Naviculales
- Family: Pinnulariaceae
- Genus: Pinnularia; Ehrenberg

= Pinnularia =

Genus of single-celled organisms

Pinnularia is a genus of fresh water algae, more specifically a type of diatom.

== Habitat ==
Pinnularia is a predominantly fresh-water algae usually found in ponds and moist soil. They can also be found in springs, estuaries, sediments, and oceans. Members of this genus are most commonly found in 40 cm (16 in) of water, at 5 °C (41 °F).

== External structure ==
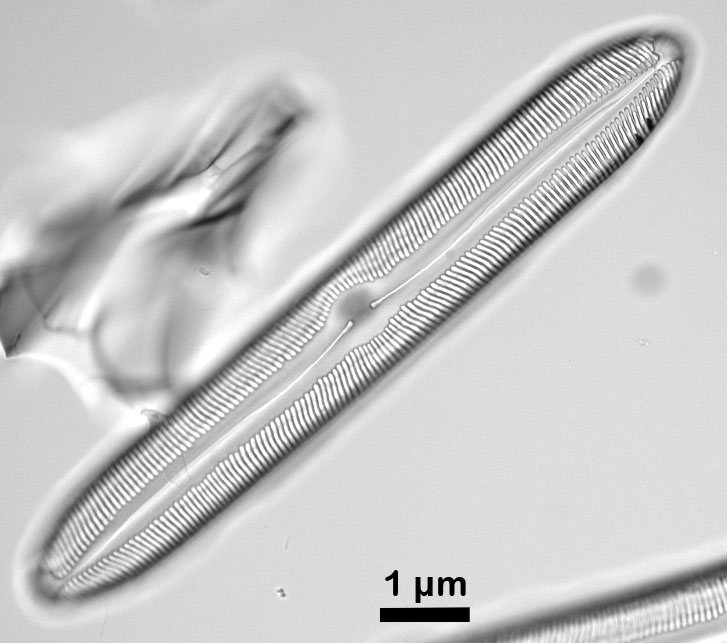
Pinnularia opulenta

Pinnularia are elongated elliptical unicellular organisms. Their cell walls are composed chiefly of pectic substances on a rigid silica framework, and composed of two halves called thecae (or less formally, valves). These halves overlap like a Petri dish and its cover, the outer larger valve called Epitheca and the smaller called hypotheca. The margins of the two thecae are covered by a connecting band called a cingulum and all together are referred to as a frustule, and the whole cell is covered by a mucilaginous layer. The surface view is called valve view and band view is called girdle view.

== Internal structure ==
The cytoplasm is arranged approximately in layers conforming to the shape of the cell's walls. A large central vacuole is present with the nucleus suspended in its centre by a transverse cytoplasmic bridge. Two chloroplasts are present along the sides of the cells, and contain chlorophyll a, c, beta-carotene and fucoxanthin pigments. One or two pyrenoids are usually present in each chloroplast, although like many heterokont algae, Pinnularia tend to store their energy as fat. The cytoplasm also contains chrysolaminarin and some volutin.

== Reproduction ==
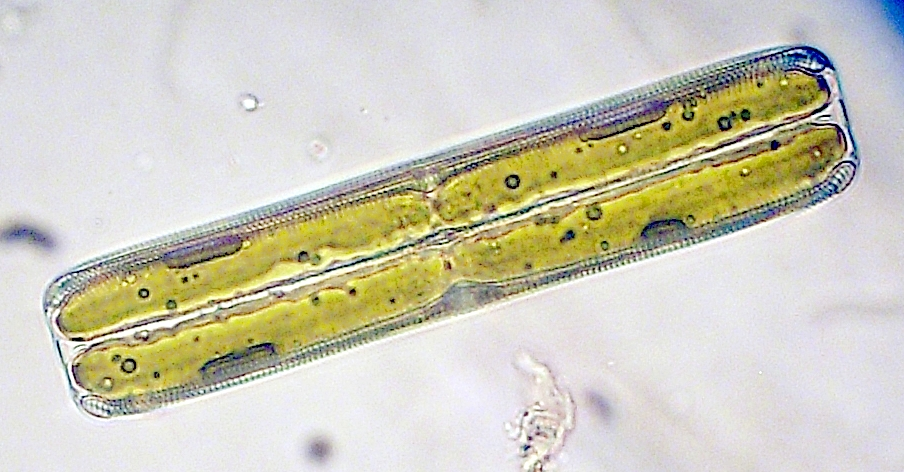
Pinnularia diatom during reproduction (cell division)

Pinnularia, like most diatoms, can reproduce by simple cell division. Nuclear division occurs by mitosis and cell divides into two parts. Each daughter receives one of the parent cell's thecae, which becomes that cell's epitheca. The cell then synthesizes a new hypotheca. Thus, one daughter is the same size as the parent, and one is slightly smaller. With subsequent generations, the average cell size of a Pinnularia population gradually becomes smaller. When a minimum average size is reached, auxospore formation occurs and sexual reproduction restores the population's average cell size.
