= Uvula (disambiguation) =

The uvula is a fleshy lobe hanging from the back of the mouth.

The uvula may also refer to:

- Uvula of cerebellum
- Uvula of urinary bladder
