= Laryngeal cyst =

Cyst involving the larynx or supraglottic locations

- Specialty: Otorhinolaryngology

Laryngeal cysts are cysts involving the larynx or more frequently supraglottic locations, such as epiglottis and vallecula. Usually they do not extend to the thyroid cartilage. They may be present congenitally or may develop eventually due to degenerative cause. They often interfere with phonation.

== Presentation ==
Hoarseness is the most common presenting symptom, while pain, stridor or laryngeal obstruction are unusual complaints. They may cause significant respiratory obstruction leading to dyspnoea or respiratory distress and even cyanosis, and jugular and epigastric retractions. Congenital lesions may present with severe airway obstruction at birth calling for emergency intervention and intubation.

== Diagnosis ==
=== Types ===
There are three types of laryngeal cysts, namely, mucous, hemorrhagic and congenital. However, a new classification system for congenital laryngeal cysts on the basis of the extent of the cyst and the embryologic tissue of origin, is proposed for the ease of initial surgical management.

== Treatment ==
Treatment can be medical or surgical. Laser endoscopic treatment is often preferred. Voice therapy is sometimes necessary.

== Epidemiology ==
Congenital cysts of the larynx with incidence of about 1.8 in 100,000 newborns.

Laryngeal cysts form 4% of all laryngeal tumors or about 5% of benign laryngeal lesions. Prevalence is about equal between the sexes.

== See also ==
- Vocal fold nodule
