= Nikolai Lunin =

Nikolai Lunin or Nikolay Lunin (Russian: Николай Лунин) may refer to the following notable people:

- Nikolai Lunin (admiral) (1907–1970), admiral in the Soviet Navy
- Nikolai Lunin (scientist) (1854 –1937), Russian scientist
