= Julius Arnold =

German pathologist

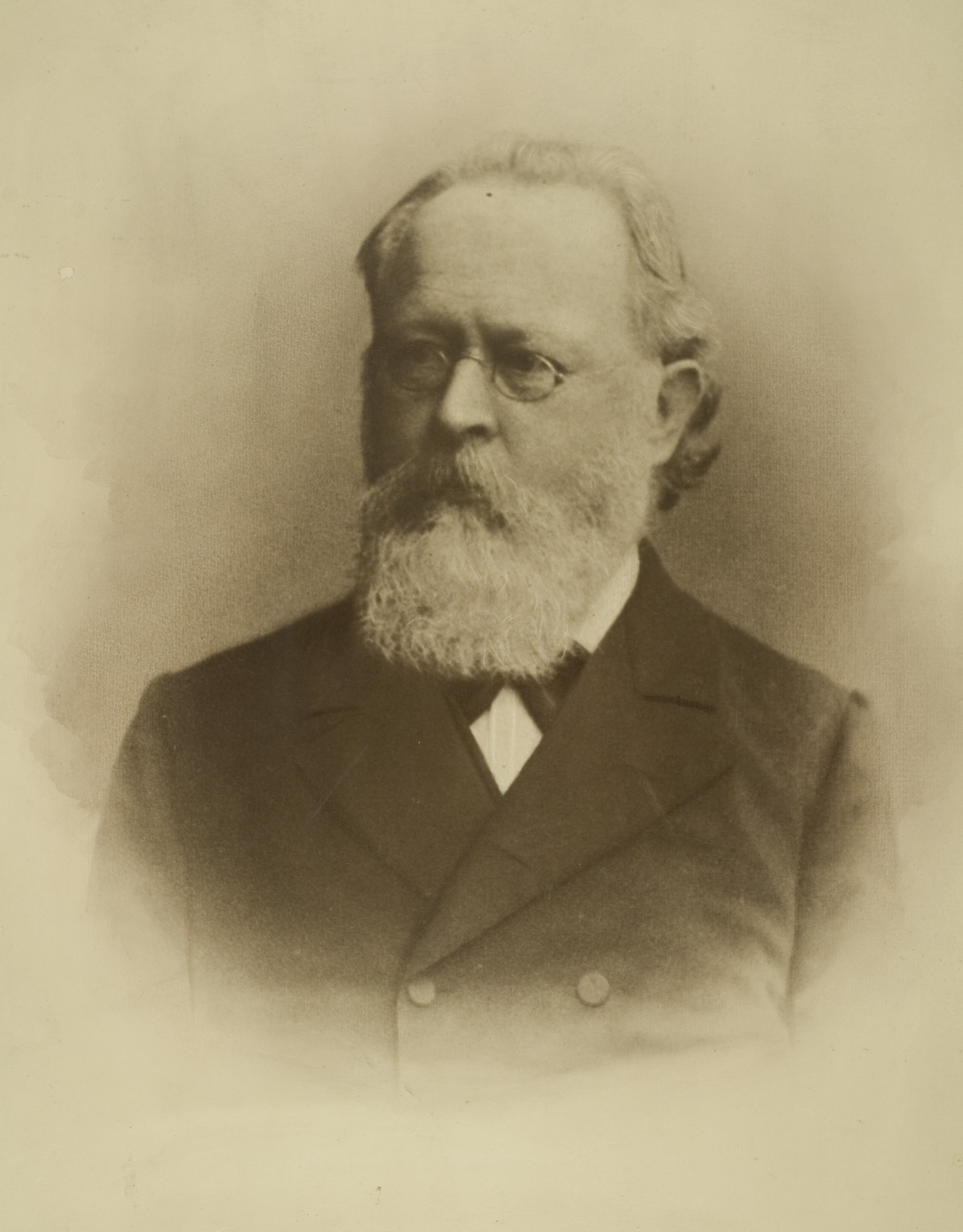
Julius Arnold (1835–1915)

Julius Arnold (19 August 1835 – 3 February 1915) was a German pathologist born in Zurich. He was the son of anatomist Friedrich Arnold (1803–1890).

He studied medicine at the Universities of Heidelberg, Prague, Vienna and Berlin, where he was a student of Rudolf Virchow (1821–1902). In 1859 he became a doctor of medicine, and in 1866 he became a professor of pathological anatomy and director of the Institute of Pathology at Heidelberg. Following his retirement he was succeeded as director of the Institute of Pathology by his former student Professor Paul Ernst. Arnold was the author of 120 articles in the fields of histology and pathological anatomy.

With Austrian pathologist, Hans Chiari, his name is lent to a condition known as Arnold–Chiari malformation, a disorder that takes place when the cerebellar tonsils and the medulla oblongata protrude through the foramen magnum into the spinal canal, without displacing the lower brain stem. Arnold described his pathological findings associated with the disorder from an infant who died shortly after delivery. He published his account of the disorder in an 1894 paper titled "Myelocyste, Transposition von Gewebskeimen und Sympodie". In 1907, two of Arnold's students coined the eponym of "Arnold–Chiari malformation" in honour of the two scientists.

Arnold died in 1915 in Heidelberg.

== Selected works ==
- Anatomische Beiträge zu der Lehre von den Schusswunden, Heidelberg 1873 – Anatomical contributions associated with gunshot wounds.
- Untersuchungen über Staubinhalation und Staubmetastase, Leipzig 1885 – Studies on dust inhalation and metastasis.
- Über den Kampf des menschlichen Körpers mit den Bakterien, Heidelberg 1888 – On the struggle of the human body with bacteria.

== See also ==
- Pathology
- List of pathologists
