= Vallecula of cerebellum =

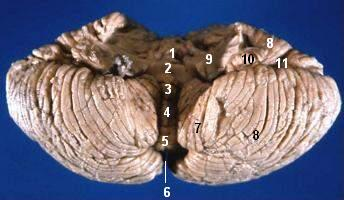
- Human cerebellum anterior view description (Vallecula cerebelli is #6)

Details

Identifiers
- Latin: vallecula cerebelli
- NeuroNames: 646
- TA98: A14.1.07.005
- TA2: 5800
- FMA: 75267

On the superior aspect of cerebellum, the vermis protrudes above the level of the hemispheres, but on the inferior surface it is sunk almost out of sight in the bottom of a deep depression between them; this depression is called the vallecula of the cerebellum, and lodges the posterior part of the medulla oblongata and the inferior vermis, which consists of the tuber vermis, pyramid, uvula and nodule.

== See also ==
- Vallecula
