= Paul Ernst =

Paul Ernst may refer to:

- Paul Ernst (biathlete) (1935–2024), Austrian Olympic biathlete
- Paul Ernst (German writer) (1866–1933)
- Paul Ernst (American writer) (1899–1985), pulp fiction writer
- Paul Ernst (pathologist) (1859–1937)

== See also ==
- Paul Ernest, philosopher of mathematics
