= Johann Baptist Chiari =

Austrian gynecologist and obstetrician (1817–1854)

Johann Baptist Chiari (15 June 1817 – 11 December 1854) was an Austrian gynecologist and obstetrician.

== Biography ==
Johann Baptist Chiari was born in Salzburg on 15 June 1817, to a family of Italian origin. In 1841 he received his medical doctorate at Vienna, where he subsequently practiced obstetrics and gynecology for most of his professional career. In 1853 he became a professor of obstetrics at the University of Prague, and for a short time worked in the Josephinum of Vienna. He died in 1854 at the age of 37 from cholera.

He was the father of pathologist Hans Chiari (1851–1916) and rhinolaryngologist Ottokar Chiari (1853–1918). He was the son-in-law of Johann Klein, to whom he was also an assistant at the first obstetrical clinic in Vienna from 1842 to 1844.

With Karl von Braun-Fernwald (1822–1891) and Joseph Späth (1823–1896), Chiari was co-publisher of an important handbook on obstetrics titled Klinik der Geburtshilfe und Gynäkologie. This textbook was the first to present the theories of Ignaz Philipp Semmelweis (1818–1865) in regards to hygiene and prevention of the spread of puerperal fever. With German gynecologist Richard Frommel (1854–1912) the eponymous "Chiari-Frommel Syndrome" is named. This is a postnatal disorder that is also known as postpartum galactorrhea-amenorrhea syndrome.
