= Heinrich Zangger =

Swiss toxicologist (1874–1957)

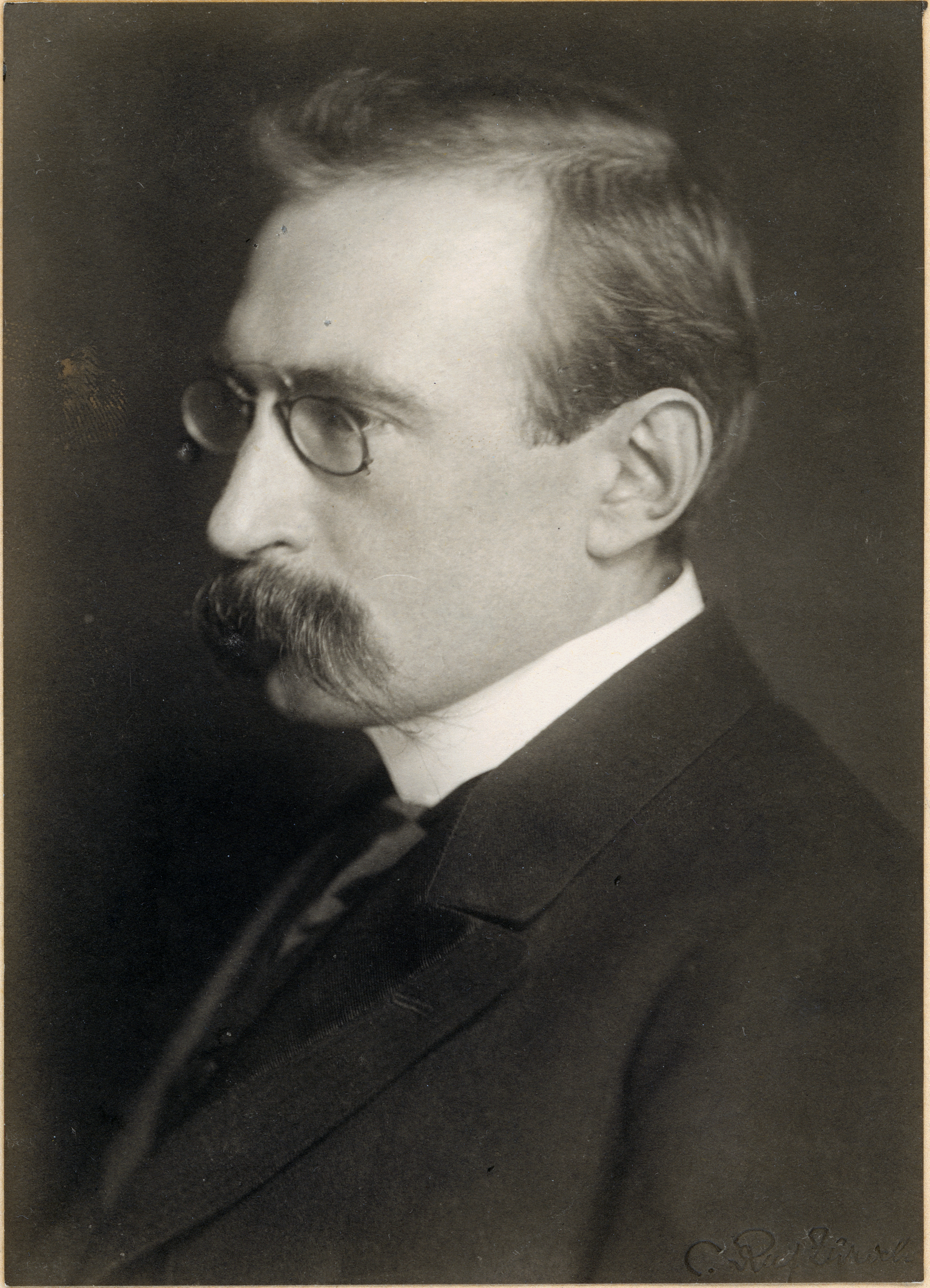
- Born: 6 December 1874; Bubikon, Switzerland
- Died: 15 March 1957 (aged 82); Zürich, Switzerland
- Education: University of Zurich (PhD, 1902)

Heinrich Zangger (6 December 1874 – 15 March 1957) was a Swiss toxicologist and coroner. He was one of the "foremost forensic scientists of his generation".

== Biography ==
Zangger was the son of a prosperous farmer and studied medicine at the University of Zurich. There he received his medical doctorate on February 19, 1902, which he wrote under the supervision of his academic promotor professor Paul Ernst. His doctoral dissertation is titled Histologisch-färbetechnische Erfahrungen im Allgemeinen und speziell über die Möglichkeit einer morphologischen Darstellung der Zellnarkose [vitale Färbung] (Histological-technical staining experiences in general and specifically about the possibility of a morphological representation of cell anesthesia [vital staining]). On April 15, 1902, he was appointed professor extraordinarius for anatomy and special physiology of domestic animals at the Faculty of Veterinary Medicine (animal hospital) of the University of Zurich.

On September 7, 1905, he was appointed professor extraordinarius for forensic medicine at the University of Zurich with effect from April 15, 1906. From March 21, 1912, until his retirement on October 15, 1941, Zangger was professor ordinarius and director of the newly founded Institute for Forensic Medicine.

In 1905 Zangger won international fame as a hero for his role in guiding the rescue in the commune Courrières of over 100 French coal miners trapped underground by an explosion. Officials in the French government had contemplated abandoning the rescue attempt when Zangger's examination of the mine shafts brought conviction to continue the rescue effort.

He was a leading expert not only in forensic medicine, but also in the aspects of law, politics, and ethics related to medicine. In 1932 he was elected to the International Committee of the Red Cross, of which he was an active member until 1947 and later an honorary member. He was involved in drafting the Zürcher Strafgesetzbuch (Zurich Criminal Code) and the Liability Act. He was also a pioneer of environmental protection and disaster medicine.

In 1924 he received the Marcel Benoist Prize for his book Vergiftungen (Poisoning), published in 1924. According to the prize citation, Zinger's book was the first to indicate many of the new dangers of poisoning associated with technological development. The book gave valuable guidelines for combating such dangers and for diagnosing the symptoms caused by the new forms of poisoning and thus for improving therapy and prevention. As early as 1925, he pointed out the danger of the additive of tetraethyl lead to fuels. In 1925 he was elected a Member of the German Academy of Sciences Leopoldina.

In 1906 he married Mathilde Mayenfisch. Robert Schulmann had a hint from Gina Zangger, Heinrich's daughter, that Evelyn Einstein, who was the adopted daughter of Hans Albert and Frieda Einstein, might have been Albert Einstein's illegitimate daughter.

Heinrich Zangger's body was buried at Friedhof Sihlfeld. His fonds are in the manuscript department of the Zentralbibliothek Zürich.

== Friendship and correspondence with Albert Einstein ==
Zangger had known Albert Einstein since 1906, when he asked Einstein for advice on a patent matter. There was a lively exchange of letters between Zangger and Einstein up until 1933. Einstein's last letter is dated 1947. Zangger was instrumental in ensuring that Einstein was appointed professor of theoretical physics at ETH Zurich in 1912. To achieve Einstein's appointment, Zangger worked with Ludwig Forrer, the member of the Swiss Federal Council, in charge of education. Zangger argued that theoretical physicists are less of a financial burden because they can work without access to a laboratory. Zannger also certified from his own experience that Einstein would be a good teacher. Zangger had attended weekly lectures by Einstein at the University of Zurich when Einstein was a lecturer in 1909 and then an associate professor before moving to Prague in 1911. The polytechnic in Zurich had recently been upgraded to a full university (i.e. Swiss Federal Institute of Technology in Zürich) with the right to award doctorates. At the time, Einstein was negotiating for a professorship in Utrecht and was thus also able to exert influence. Marie Curie and Henri Poincaré wrote letters of recommendation for Einstein.

Perhaps the best known letter of Einstein to Zangger is the November 1915 letter in which Einstein suggested that David Hilbert was the only colleague who was able to understand Einstein's newly developed theory of general relativity. In that famous letter, Einstein complained about his wife Mileva and claimed that Hilbert was attempting to take credit for general relativity.

After Einstein and his first wife separated and Einstein remained in Berlin, Heinrich Zangger greatly assisted Einstein's estranged wife and two sons, who lived in Zurich. Zangger's assistance lasted "well into the 1930s".

== Sources ==
- Hans Fischer: Heinrich Zangger – Ein großer Pionier des Gefährdungsschutzes und Kämpfer gegen die Gefahren der Umwelt (6. Dezember 1874 bis 15. März 1957) Zu seinem 100. Geburtstag. In: Gesnerus. vol. 31 (1974), nos. 3/4, pp. 149–162 (Digitalisat bei E-Periodica)
- Albrecht Fölsing: Albert Einstein, Suhrkamp 1993
- Christof Rieber: Albert Einstein. Biografie eines Nonkonformisten. Thorbecke, Ostfildern 2018, ISBN 978-3-7995-1281-7

== Selected publications ==
- Robert Schulmann (ed.), in collaboration with Ruth Jörg: Seelenverwandte. Der Briefwechsel zwischen Albert Einstein und Heinrich Zangger (1910–1947) Verlag Neue Zürcher Zeitung, Zürich 2012, ISBN 978-3-03-823784-6.
- with Ferdinand Flury, Max Cloetta, Erich Hübener: Lehrbuch der Toxikologie für Studium und Praxis. Berlin, Springer 1928.
- Vergiftungen, Leipzig, Thieme 1924
- Zangger, Hr. (1930). "Erfahrungen über Quecksilbervergiftungen" (PDF). Archiv für Gewerbepathologie und Gewerbehygiene. 1 (4): 539–560.
