= Richard Frommel =

German obstetrician and gynaecologist

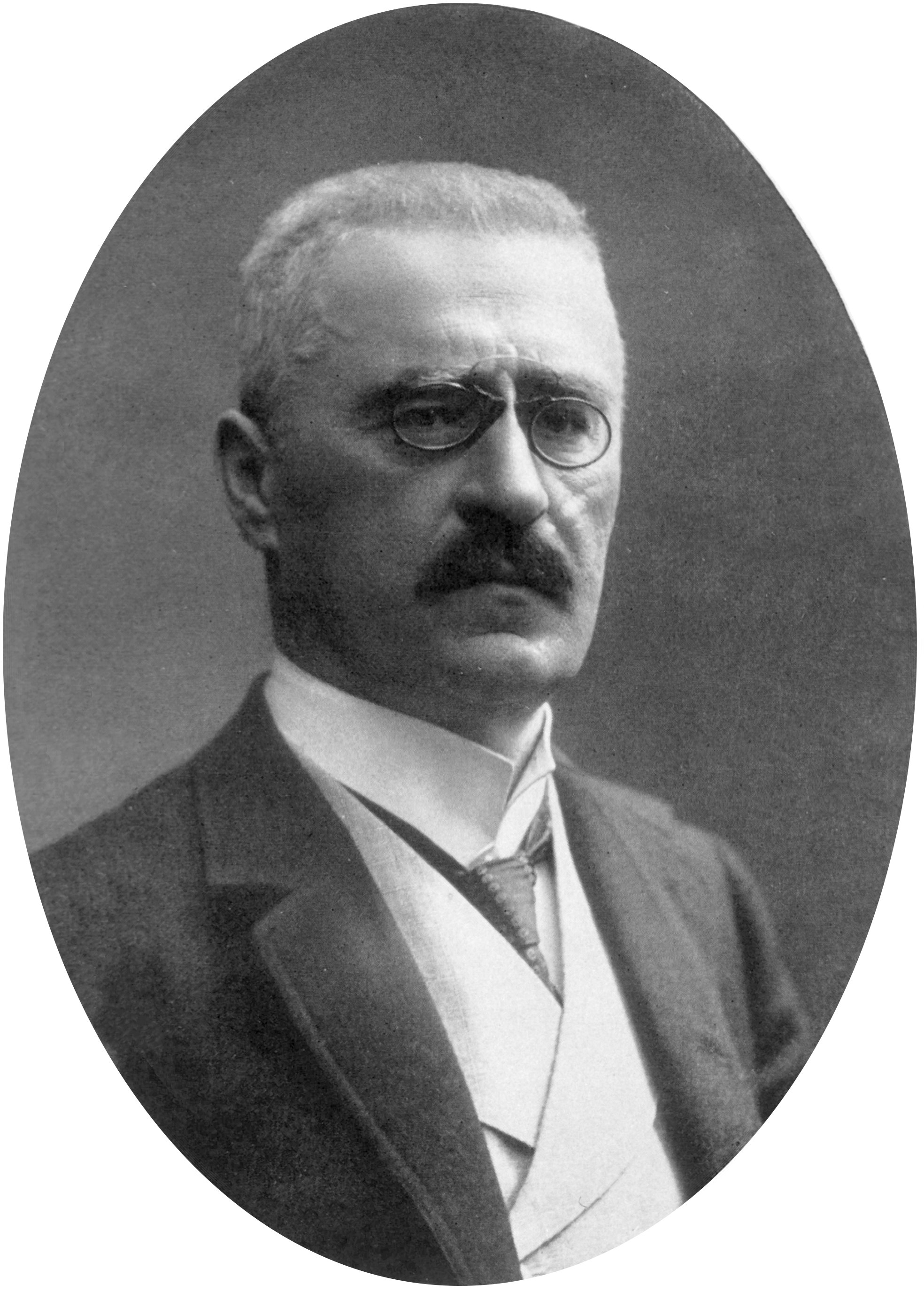
Richard Frommel

Richard Julius Ernst Frommel (16 July 1854 – 6 April 1912) was a German obstetrician and gynecologist who was a native of Augsburg.

In 1877 he received his medical doctorate at the University of Würzburg, and for the next ten years worked in Vienna, Berlin and Munich. At Berlin he was an assistant to gynecologist Karl Ludwig Ernst Schroeder (1838–1887). From 1887 until 1901 he was director of the department of obstetrics and gynaecology at the University of Erlangen. Despite a successful career in gynecology, Frommel abruptly retired from medicine in 1901 at the age of 46.

Frommel is known for his pioneer work in treatment of ruptured ectopic pregnancy. A surgical technique known as the "Frommel operation" is used as treatment for retroversion of the uterus. This surgery involves shortening the uterosacral ligaments via the abdominal route.

With Johann Baptist Chiari (1817–1854), the eponymous "Chiari-Frommel Syndrome" is named. This condition is a rare endocrine disorder that affects women who have recently given birth. It is also known as postpartum galactorrhea-amenorrhea syndrome.
