= Joseph Späth =

Austrian academic (1823–1896)

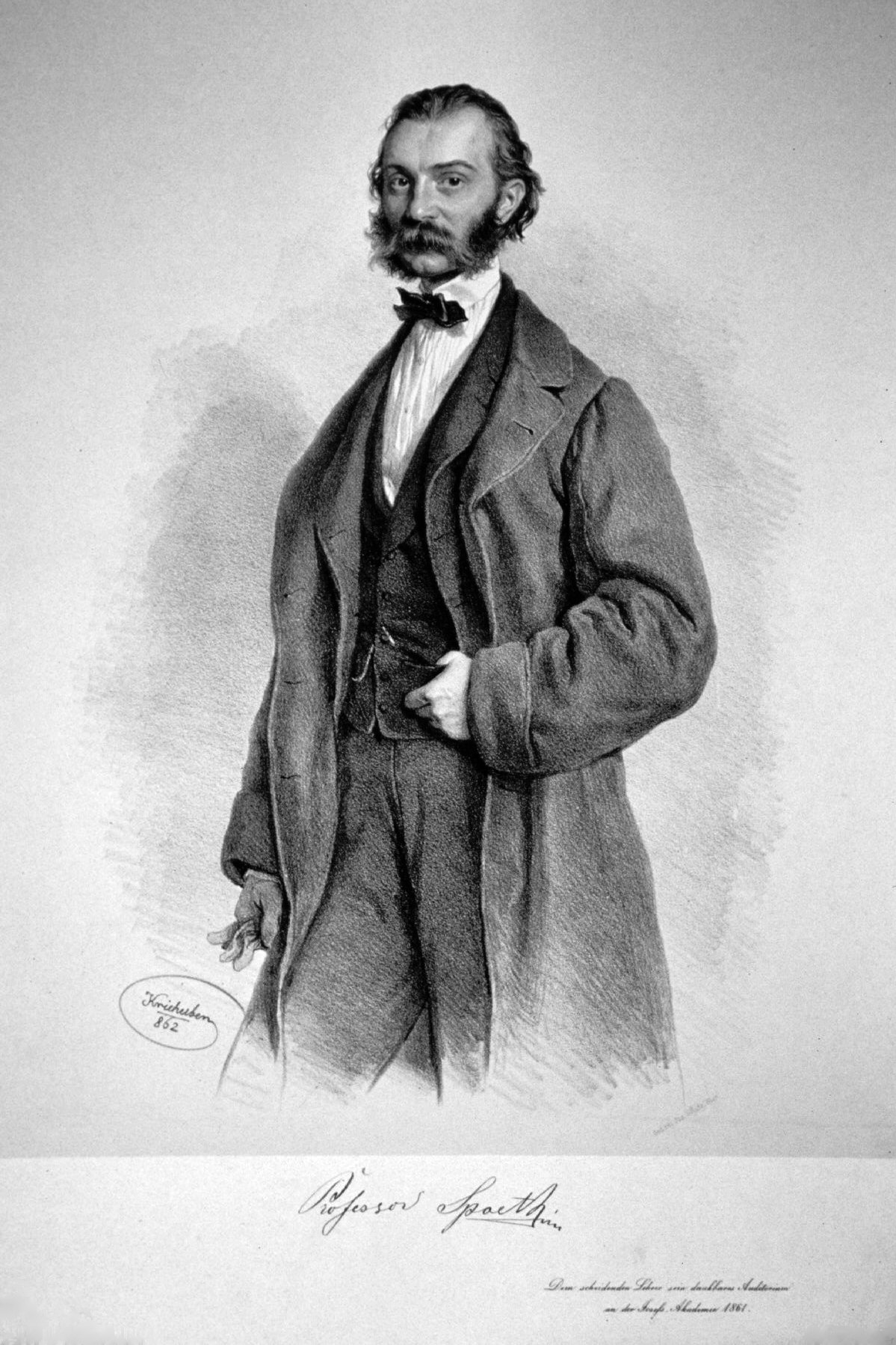
Joseph Späth

Joseph Späth (13 March 1823 in Bozen – 29 March 1896) was professor of obstetrics in Vienna, and from 1873 to 1886 he was director of the second obstetrical clinic at the Vienna General Hospital.

Following graduation at the University of Vienna in 1849, he became an assistant to Johann Baptist Chiari (1817–1854). Afterwards he worked at the maternity clinic for midwives until 1853. In 1861, he was appointed professor of obstetrics in Vienna, and in 1873, he became director of the second obstetrical-gynecological clinic. In 1872/73, he served as university rector.

Ignaz Semmelweis (1818–1865) regarded him as a principal opponent. By 1864, however, he had adopted Semmelweis's view, and observed that virtually all obstetricians were convinced that Semmelweis was correct, although few admitted it openly.

In 1953, the thoroughfare Späthgasse (District 22, Donaustadt) in Vienna was named after him.

== Written works ==
- Klinik der Geburtshülfe und Gynäkologie, 1855 (Clinic of obstetrics and gynecology) with Johann Baptist Chiari and Karl Braun (1822–1891).
- Studien über Zwillinge, 1860 (Study of twins).
- Ueber mehrere Anomalien der die Frucht umgebenden Eitheile, 1861 with Carl Wedl (1815-1891)
- Sanitäts- Verhältnisse der Wöchnerinnen 1863 an der Geburtsklinik für Hebammen (Sanitary conditions of mothers in 1863 at the maternity hospital for midwives).
- Lehrbuch der Geburteshülfe für Hebammen; 1869, third edition 1880 (Textbook of obstetrics for midwives).
