= Marissa Irwin =

American model

Marissa Irwin is an American model best known for her appearances on the cover of Bridal Guide and in Seventeen Magazine.

A native of Canton, Ohio, she received training from the Barbizon modeling school of Akron. She now lives and works in New York City.

Marissa lives with a rare and painful disorder called Arnold–Chiari malformation secondary to Ehlers–Danlos syndrome. Her medical story has appeared in the Discovery Health Channel series Mystery Diagnosis.
