= Hans Hunziker =

Swiss psychiatrist (1878–1941)

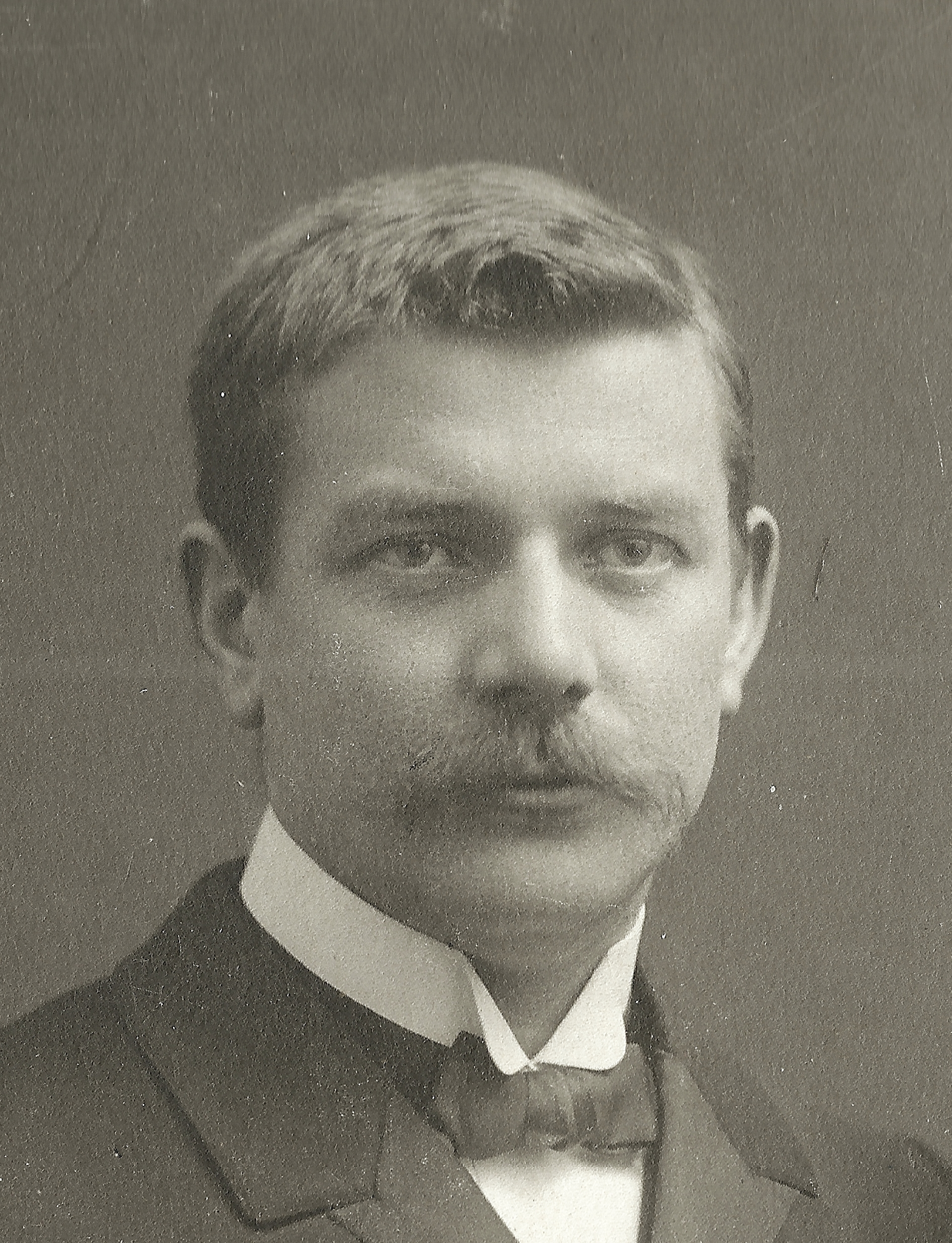
- Hans & wife, Brunhilde Kramer
- Born: 2 August 1878; Attelwil, Switzerland
- Died: 17 December 1941 (aged 63); Basel, Switzerland
- Citizenship: Swiss
- Education: University of Zurich
- Known for: works on alcoholism, neuropsychiatry
- Spouse: Brunhilde Kramer
- Children: Rose Reimann-Hunziker
- Scientific career
- Fields: Psychiatry; Social hygiene; Intraventricular brain tumors
- Workplaces: University of Basel; Cantonal Health Office of Basel-Stadt
- Doctoral advisor: Paul Ernst
- Other academic advisors: Gustav von Bunge; Auguste Forel
- Doctoral students: Hans Martin Sutermeister

Hans Hunziker (2 August 1878 – 17 December 1941) was a Swiss psychiatrist, professor of social medicine at University of Basel, head of the Cantonal Health Office of Basel-Stadt, and notable for his contributions on neuropsychiatry. He wrote his thesis under the supervision of Professor Paul Ernst entitled: "Uber intraventrikulaere gehirntumoren", which he defended successfully on January 3, 1906.

== Publications ==
- Die Basler Thyphusepidemie vom August 1931. Lecture / Paper presented at the Medical Society of Basel, 3 December 1931. Schweizerische Medizinische Wochenschrift, vol. 62, issue 38. Basel: Benno Schwabe, 1932.
- Das Wasser als Träger von Krankheitskeimen. Lecture / Paper presented at the 58th Annual Assembly of the Swiss Gas and Water Professionals Association (SVGW) in Basel, 5 September 1931. Monats-Bulletin des Schweizerischen Vereins von Gas- und Wasserfachmännern. Zurich, 1931, Nr.10.
- “Die Bedeutung des Rheinstauwerks Kembs für die Abwasseranlage und den Grundwasserstand der Stadt Basel und die zur Vermeidung hygienischer Misstände notwendigen Massnahmen”. In: Technische Hygiene, Schweizerische Zeitschrift für Strassenwesen, Zurich, 1931, Nr.7/8.
- “Hygienische Gesichtspunkte beim Bau des neuen Zentralfriedhofes in Basel”. In: Technische Hygiene, Schweizerische Zeitschrift für Strassenwesen Nr.5. Solothurn: Vogt-Schild, 1931.
- “Welche Anforderungen sind an den Hygieneunterricht für Lehrer und Schüler zu stellen?”. Schweizerische Zeitschrift für Gesundheitspflege und Archiv für Sozialfürsorge. vol. VIII, Nr.5. Zurich: Gutswiller, 1928.
- “Der Kampf gegen das Kurpfuschertum in der Schweiz”. Veröffentlichungen aus dem Gebiete der Medizinalverwaltung. vol. 27, Nr. 8. Berlin: Schoetz, 1928. p. 7-16.
- Beitrag zur Lehre vom Acardiacus Amorphus [Contribution to the theory of Acardiacus amorphus] (in German), 1907
- Hunziker, Hans (April 1906). "Der Absinth und siene Gefahren" [The absinthe and siene hazards]. Internationale Monatsschrift zur Erforschung des Alkoholismus und Bekaempfung der Trinksitten (in German). 16 (4). Basel: Friedrich Reinhardt: 97, 129.
