= Ottokar Chiari =

Austrian physician (1853–1918)

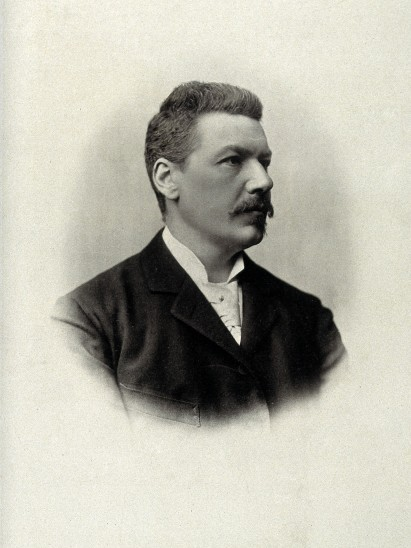
Ottokar Chiari in 1890

Ottokar Chiari (1 February 1853 – 12 May 1918) was an Austrian laryngologist and professor at the University of Vienna.

He was born in Prague. At Vienna, he was an assistant to Leopold von Schrötter (1837–1908), and later succeeded Karl Stoerk (1832–1899) as director of the laryngological clinic. He was the son of gynecologist Johann Baptist Chiari (1817–1854), and a younger brother to pathologist Hans Chiari (1851–1916).

Ottokar Chiari was a specialist in the field of rhinolaryngology, and is credited for advancing new surgical procedures at the laryngological clinic in Vienna. In 1912 he introduced the transethmoid trans-sphenoid operation.

In 1932, the Chiarigasse in Vienna-Favoriten was named in his honor.

== Selected writings ==
- Erfahrungen aus dem Gebiete der Hals- und Nasen-Krankheiten. (Experiences involving nose and throat Diseases, according to Results of Ambulatoriums). (1887).
- Krankheiten der oberen Luftwege. Vols. 1–3. Leipzig und Wien: Franz Deuticke, (1903).
- Die Wiener Klinik für Nasen- und Kehlkopfkrankheiten : erste Vorlesung in der neuen Klinik (1911)
- Chirurgie des Kehlkopfes und der Luftröhre (Surgery of the larynx and trachea) (1916).
