= Uvula =

Fleshy appendage that hangs from the back of the palate

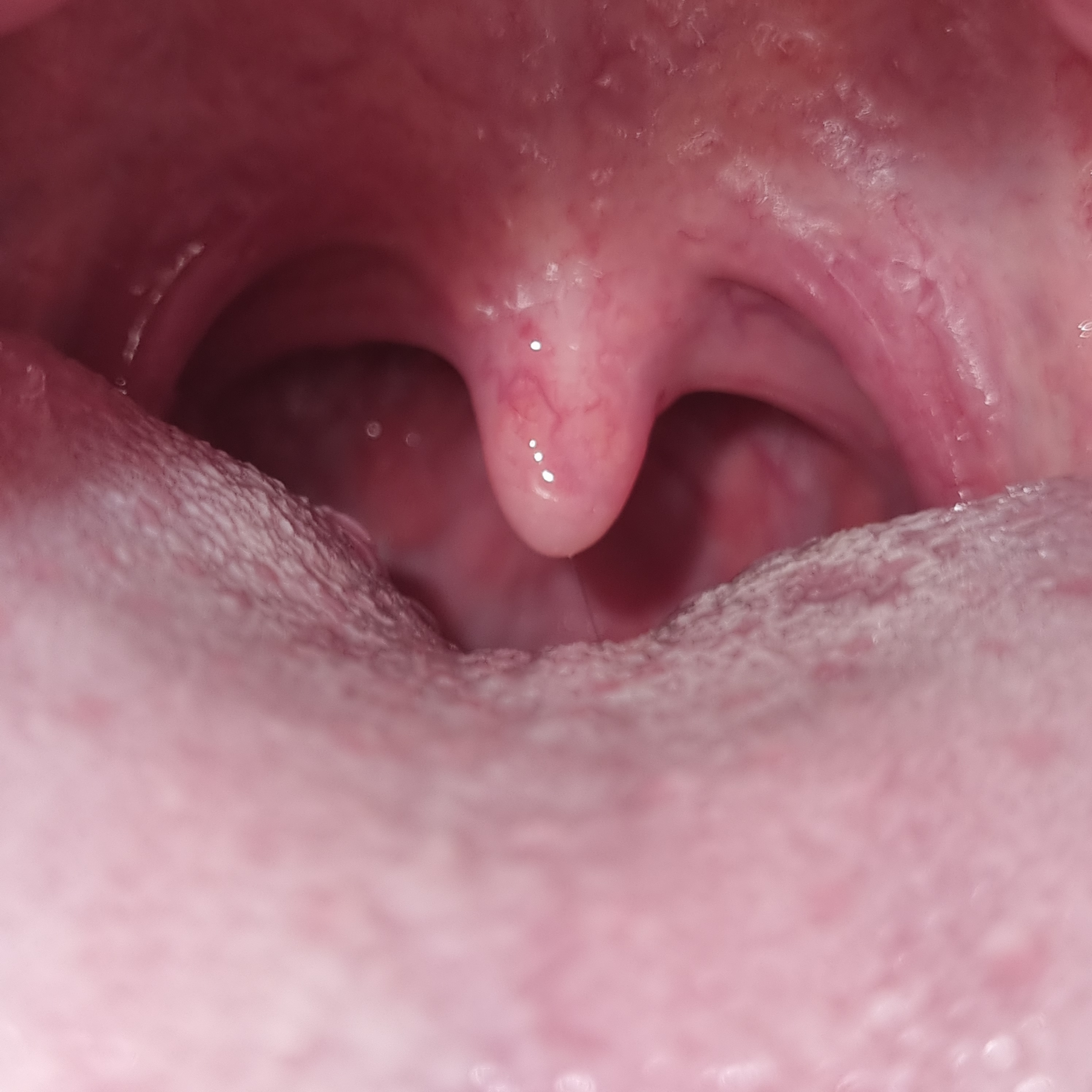
- Uvula of an adult

Details
- Pronunciation: /ˈjuːvjʊlə/
- Location: Human mouth

Identifiers
- Latin: uvula palatina
- MeSH: D014609
- TA98: A05.2.01.004
- TA2: 2781
- FMA: 55022

The uvula (pl.: uvulas or uvulae), also known as the palatine uvula or staphyle, is a conic projection from the back edge of the middle of the soft palate, composed of connective tissue containing a number of racemose glands, and some muscular fibers. It also contains many serous glands, which produce thin saliva. While historically believed that only humans have a uvula, the same structure has been found in miniature pigs.

== Structure ==
=== Muscle ===
The muscular part of the uvula (Latin: musculus uvulae) shortens and broadens the uvula. This changes the contour of the posterior part of the soft palate. This change in contour allows the soft palate to adapt closely to the posterior pharyngeal wall to help close the nasopharynx during swallowing.

Its muscles are controlled by the pharyngeal branch of the vagus nerve.

=== Variation ===
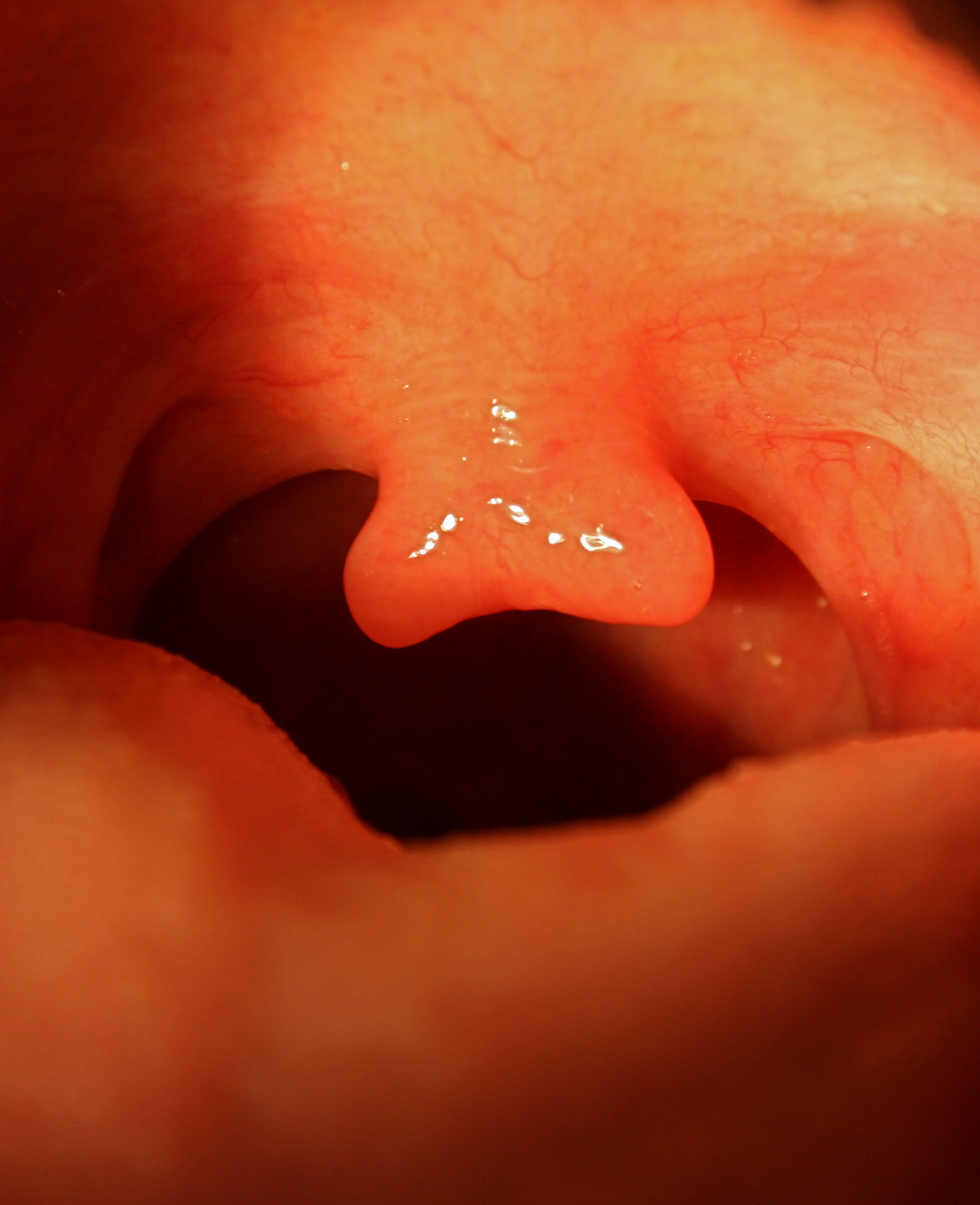
The bifid uvula of a 24-year-old woman

A bifid or bifurcated uvula is a split or cleft uvula. Newborns with cleft palate often also have a split uvula. The bifid uvula results from incomplete fusion of the palatine shelves but it is considered only a slight form of clefting. Bifid uvulas have less muscle in them than a normal uvula, which may cause recurring problems with middle ear infections. While swallowing, the soft palate is pushed backwards, preventing food and drink from entering the nasal cavity. When the soft palate fails to close against the back of the throat during swallowing, food and liquid may pass into the nasal cavity. Splitting of the uvula occurs infrequently but is the most common form of mouth and nose area cleavage among newborns. Bifid uvula occurs in about 2% of the general population, although some populations may have a high incidence, such as Native Americans who have a 10% rate.

Bifid uvula is a common symptom of the rare genetic syndrome Loeys–Dietz syndrome, which is associated with an increased risk of aortic aneurysm.

== Function ==
During swallowing, the soft palate and the uvula move together to close off the nasopharynx, and prevent food from entering the nasal cavity.

It has also been proposed that the abundant amount of thin saliva produced by the uvula serves to keep the throat well lubricated.

It has a function in speech as well. In many languages, a range of consonant sounds, known as uvular consonants, are articulated by creating a constriction of airflow between the uvula and the back of the tongue. The voiced uvular trill, written [ʀ] in the International Phonetic Alphabet, is one example; it is used in French, Arabic and Hebrew, among other languages. It has been suggested that the uvula is an accessory speech organ.

Stimulation of the uvula also causes the gag reflex to initiate. This is often a problem for people with uvula piercings, and a common method of inducing vomiting. It also acts as a food sensor/guard that aids in breathing between mouthfuls, stopping small pieces of food from being inhaled, leading to choking.

== Clinical significance ==
=== Inflammation ===
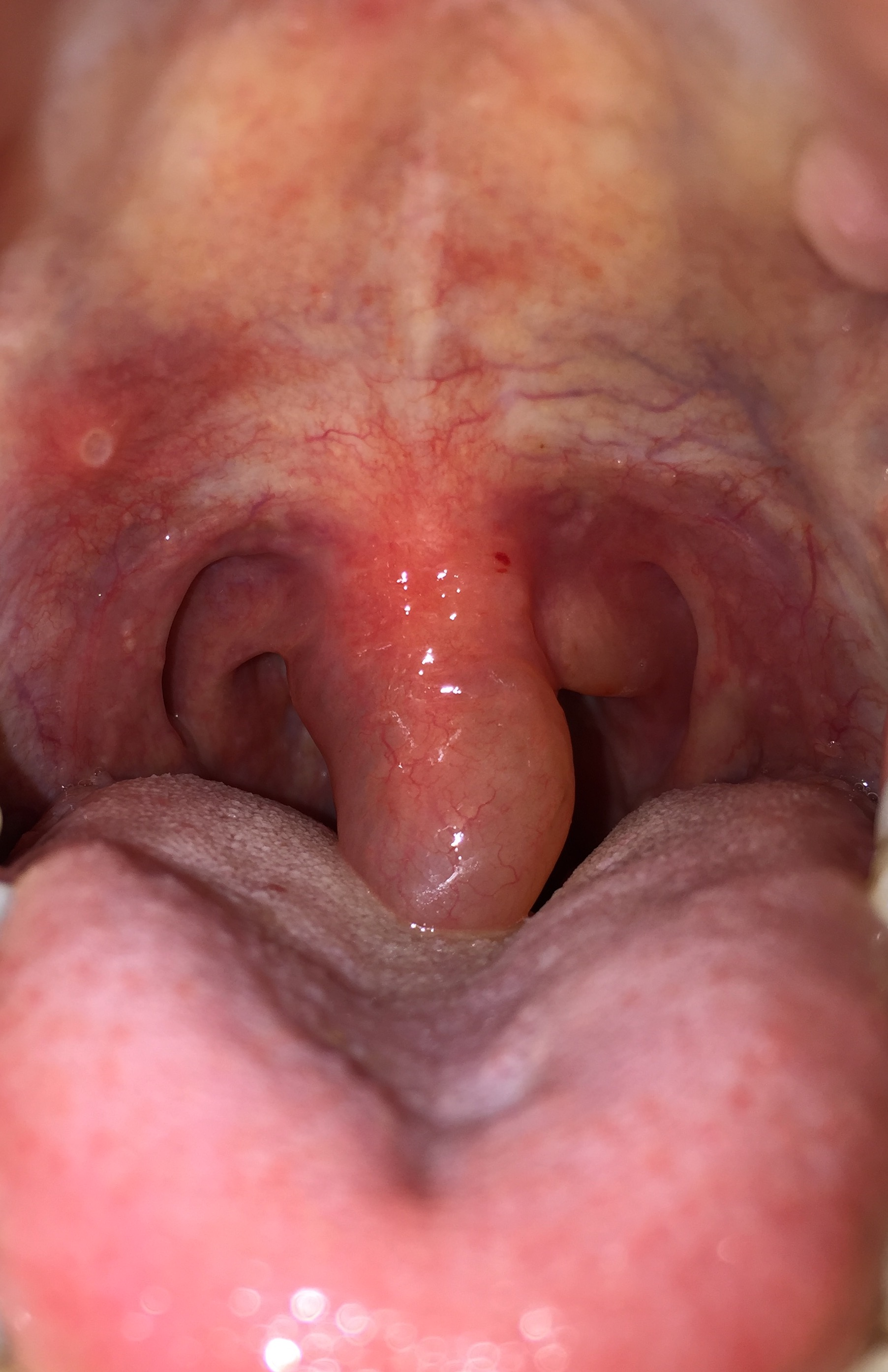
A swollen uvula with additional upper mouth ulcer in a run-down adult (common cold)

At times, the mucous membrane around the uvula may swell, causing the uvula to expand 3–5 times its normal size. This condition is known as uvulitis. When the uvula touches the throat or tongue, it can cause sensations like gagging or choking, although there is no foreign matter present. This can cause problems with breathing, talking, and eating.

There are many theories about what causes the uvula to swell, including dehydration (e.g. from arid weather); excessive smoking or other inhaled irritants; snoring; allergic reaction; or a viral or bacterial infection. An aphthous ulcer which has formed on the uvula can also cause swelling and discomfort.

If the swelling is caused by dehydration, drinking fluids may improve the condition. If the cause is a bacterial infection, gargling salt water may help. However, it can also be a sign of other problems. Some people with a history of recurring uvulitis carry an epinephrine autoinjector to counteract symptoms of an attack. A swollen uvula is not normally life-threatening and subsides in a short time, typically within a day.

=== Snoring and sleep apnea ===
The uvula can also contribute to snoring or heavy breathing during sleep; having an elongated uvula can cause vibrations that lead to snoring. In some cases this can lead to sleep apnea, which may be treated by removal of the uvula or part of it if necessary, an operation known as uvulopalatopharyngoplasty (commonly referred to as UPPP, or UP3). However, this operation can also cause sleep apnea if scar tissue forms and the airspace in the velopharynx is decreased. The success of UPPP as a treatment for sleep apnea is unknown, but some research has shown 40–60% effectiveness in reducing symptoms. Typically apnea subsides for the short term, but returns over the medium to long term, and sometimes is worse than it was before the UPPP.

=== Velopharyngeal insufficiency ===
In a small number of people, the uvula does not close properly against the back of the throat, causing a condition known as velopharyngeal insufficiency. This causes "nasal" (or more properly "hyper-nasal") speech, where extra air comes down the nose, and the speaker is unable to pronounce certain consonants, such as pronouncing [b] like [m].

=== Nasal regurgitation ===
During swallowing, the soft palate and the uvula move superiorly to close off the nasopharynx, preventing food from entering the nasal cavity. When this process fails, the result is called nasal regurgitation. It is common in people with VPI, the myositides, and neuromuscular disease. Regurgitation of fluids in this way may also occur if a particularly high volume of liquid is regurgitated, or during vigorous coughing, for example being caused by the accidental inhalation of water. Due to the action of coughing preventing the uvula from blocking the nasopharynx, liquid may be expelled back through the nose.

== Society and culture ==
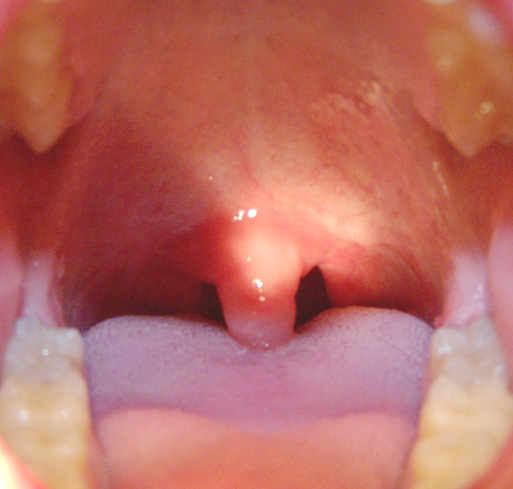
A child's swollen uvula with tonsils

In some parts of Africa, including Somalia, Ethiopia and Eritrea, the uvula or a section of it is ritually removed by a traditional healer. In this case, the uvula may be noticeably shortened. It is not thought to contribute to velopharyngeal inadequacy, except in cases where the tonsils have also been removed.

== History ==
=== Etymology ===
In Latin, ūvula means "little grape", the diminutive form of ūva "grape" (of unknown origin). A swollen uvula was called ūva.

== See also ==
- Epiglottis
- Tonsil
- Uvula (disambiguation)
