= Cerebellar tonsil =

Part of the brain

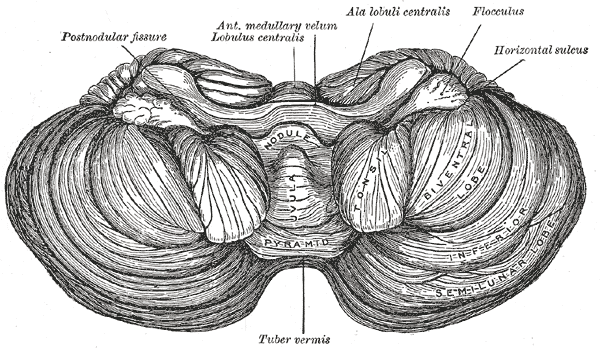
- Anterior view of the cerebellum. (Tonsil visible at center right.)

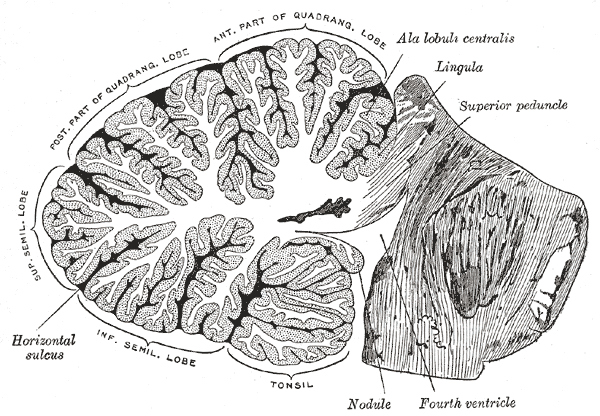
- Sagittal section of the cerebellum, near the junction of the vermis with the hemisphere. (Tonsil visible at bottom center.)

Details
- Part of: Cerebellum
- Artery: PICA

Identifiers
- Latin: tonsilla cerebelli
- NeuroNames: 671
- NeuroLex ID: nlx_anat_20081212
- TA98: A14.1.07.222
- TA2: 5817
- FMA: 83464

The cerebellar tonsil (Latin: tonsilla cerebelli) is a paired rounded lobule on the undersurface of each cerebellar hemisphere, continuous medially with the uvula of the cerebellar vermis and superiorly by the flocculonodular lobe. Synonyms include: tonsilla cerebelli, amygdala cerebelli, the latter of which is not to be confused with the cerebral tonsils or amygdala nuclei located deep within the medial temporal lobes of the cerebral cortex.

The flocculonodular lobe of the cerebellum, which can also be confused for the cerebellar tonsils, is one of three lobes that make up the overall composition of the cerebellum. The cerebellum consists of three anatomical and functional lobes: anterior lobe, posterior lobe, and flocculonodular lobe.

The cerebellar tonsil is part of the posterior lobe, also known as the neocerebellum, which is responsible for coordinating the voluntary movement of the distal parts of limbs.

Due to increased intracranial pressure, cerebellar tonsil can slip or be pushed through the foramen magnum of the skull resulting in tonsillar herniation. This is a life-threatening condition as it causes increased pressure on the medulla oblongata which contains respiratory and cardiac control centres. A congenital condition of tonsillar herniation of either one or both tonsils is called Chiari malformation.

== Pathology ==
A Type I Chiari malformation is a congenital anomaly of the brain in which the cerebellar tonsils are elongated and pushed down through the opening of the base of the skull, potentially affecting the flow of cerebrospinal fluid as it exits through the medial and lateral apertures of the fourth ventricle.

== Additional images ==
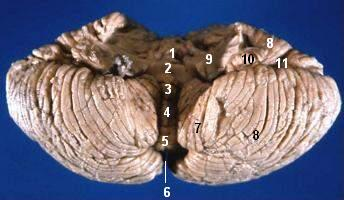
Human cerebellum anterior view

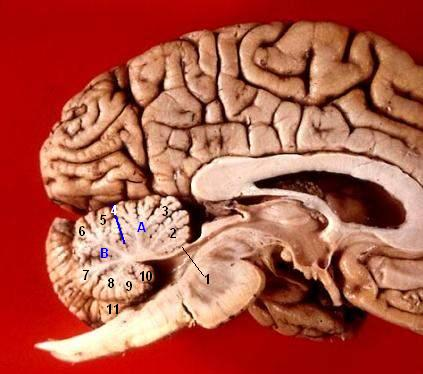
Human brain midsagittal view

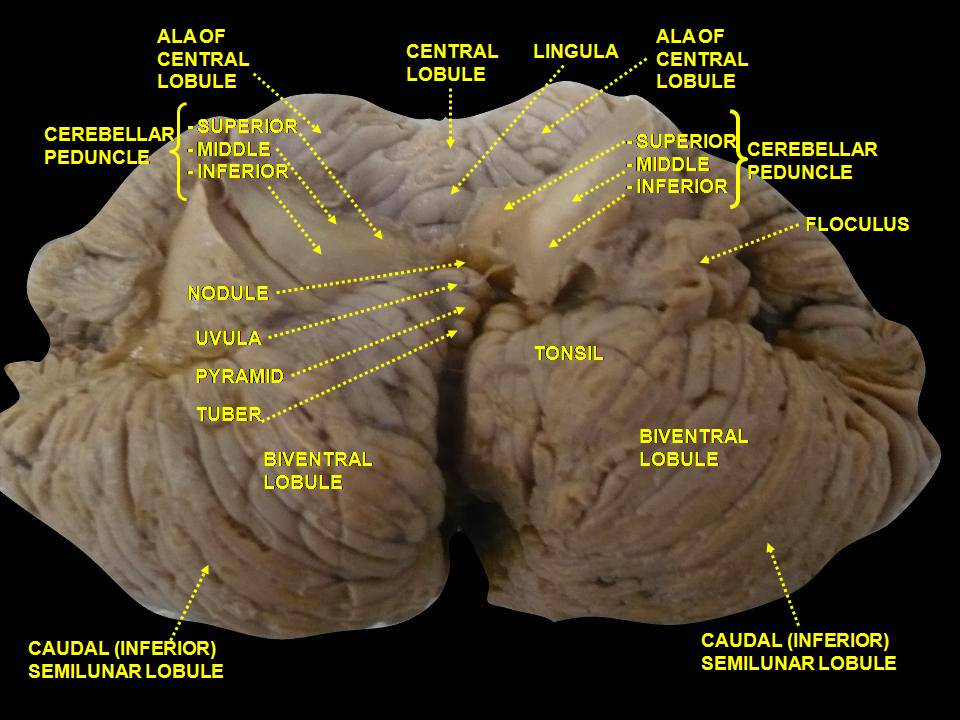
Cerebellum. Inferior surface.

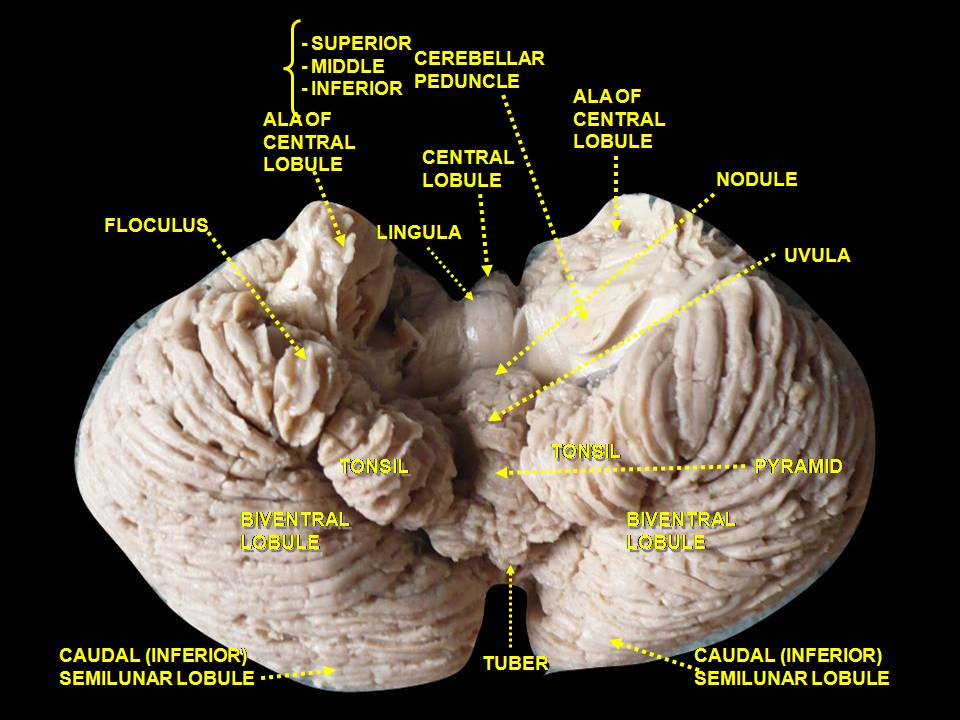
Cerebellum. Inferior surface.

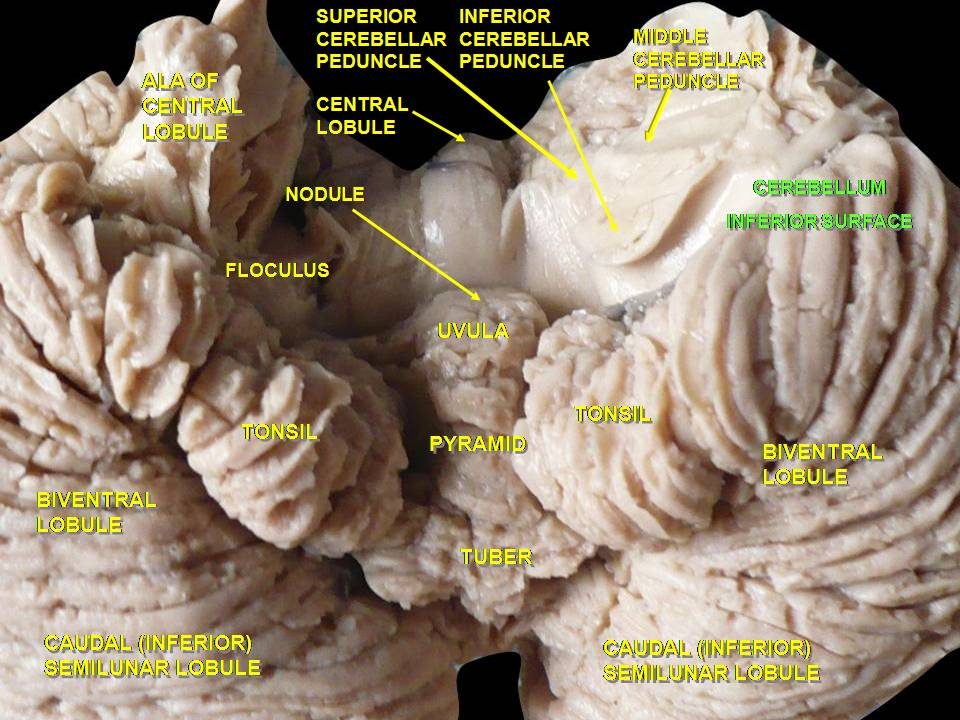
Cerebellum. Inferior surface.
