= Paul Ernst (pathologist) =

Swiss pathologist

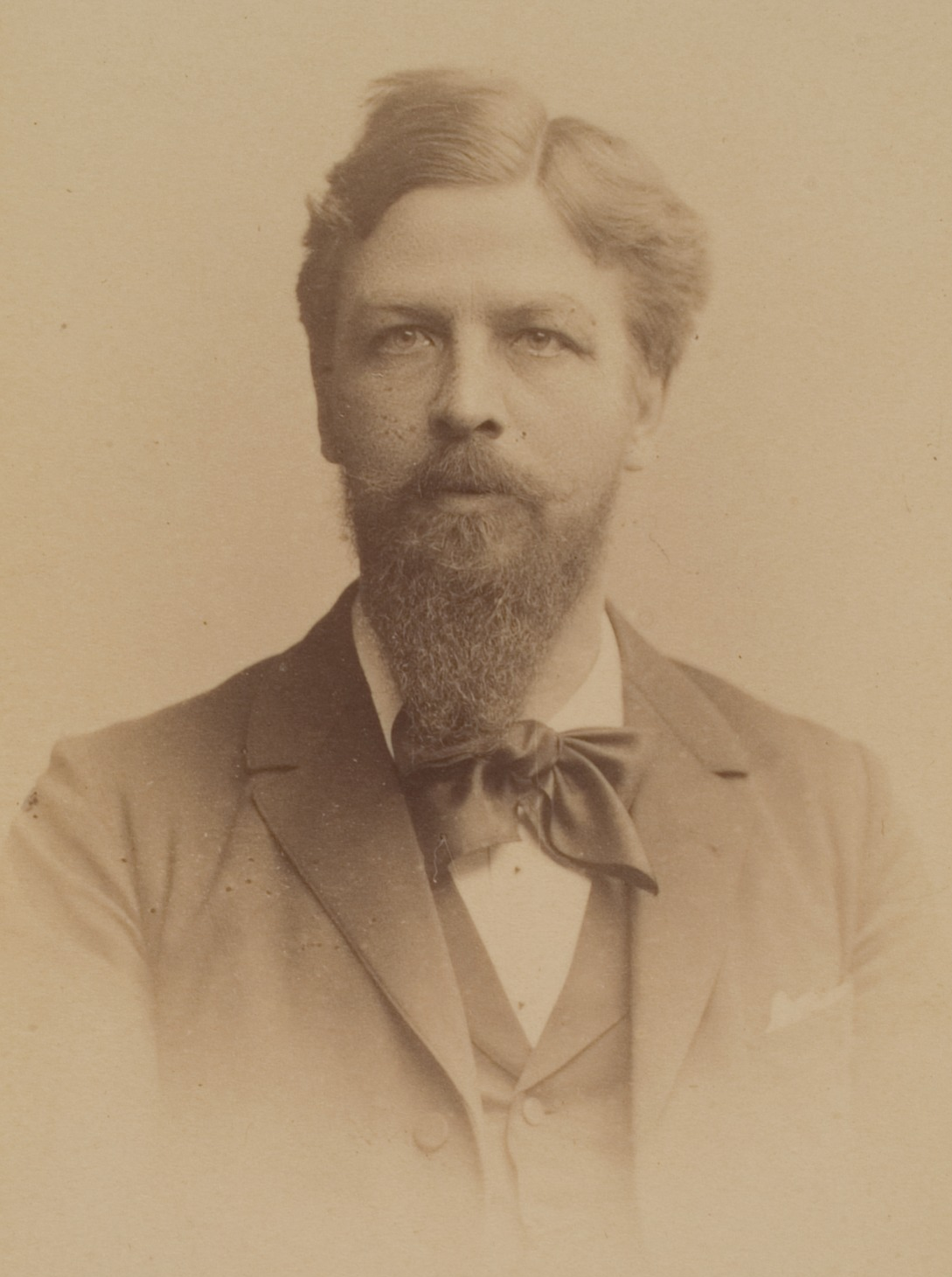
Paul Ernst; Picture taken around 1893

Paul Ernst (1859–1937) was a Swiss pathologist who studied in Zurich, Berlin and Heidelberg under Edwin Klebs, Robert Koch and Julius Arnold.

== Early life and education ==
He was born on April 26, 1859, in Zurich In the family house "Zum Garten" of the von Muralt family as the eldest son of Dr Friedrich Ernst and Anna Elisabeth von Muralt and died in 1937. His father was also a medical doctor and, for a short term (1860–1863), professor and director of the medical and surgery outpatient clinic in Zurich. His mother's lineage produced many famous physicians, such as Johannes von Muralt (1645–1733) and Ludwig von Muralt (1869–1917). Paul was conferred Doctor of Medicine in 1884 with his thesis entitled: "Zur Aetiologie der Nephritis", in which he focussed on the bacterial origin of glomerulonephritis.

== Career ==
His thesis shifted his interest towards infectious diseases, and he subsequently worked from 1885 to 1886 under the supervision of Robert Koch in Berlin. Here, he also attended demonstrations and lectures of Rudolf Virchow. This was followed by an appointment as a pathology assistant with Julius Arnold at the Ruperto Carola Universitat in Heidelberg. Here, he was selected because of his knowledge of bacteriology. He was appointed as an extraordinary professor of pathology at the Ruperto Carola Universitat in Heidelberg in 1893, followed by an appointment as full professor and director of the Institute for Pathology at the University of Zurich from 1900 to 1907.

From 1904 to 1906, he was dean of the university's medical faculty. He was subsequently asked to return to the University of Heidelberg, where he was appointed full professor and successor to his former mentor Julius Arnold from 1907 to 1928. Here, he was appointed twice as dean of the medical faculty in 1908-1909 and 1918–1919, respectively. He published on various subjects of pathology in more than 100 scientific contributions such as on histopathological staining methods of corynebacterium xerosis and corynebacterium diphtheriae. He discovered and described together with Victor Babeș metachromatic granules occurring in the protoplasm of gram-positive bacteria, protozoa and algae, which were later known under the eponymous name Babes-Ernst granules or Volutin granules. He worked on the structure of myelin sheaths of peripheral nerves and so-called spherical crystals in cancer cells.

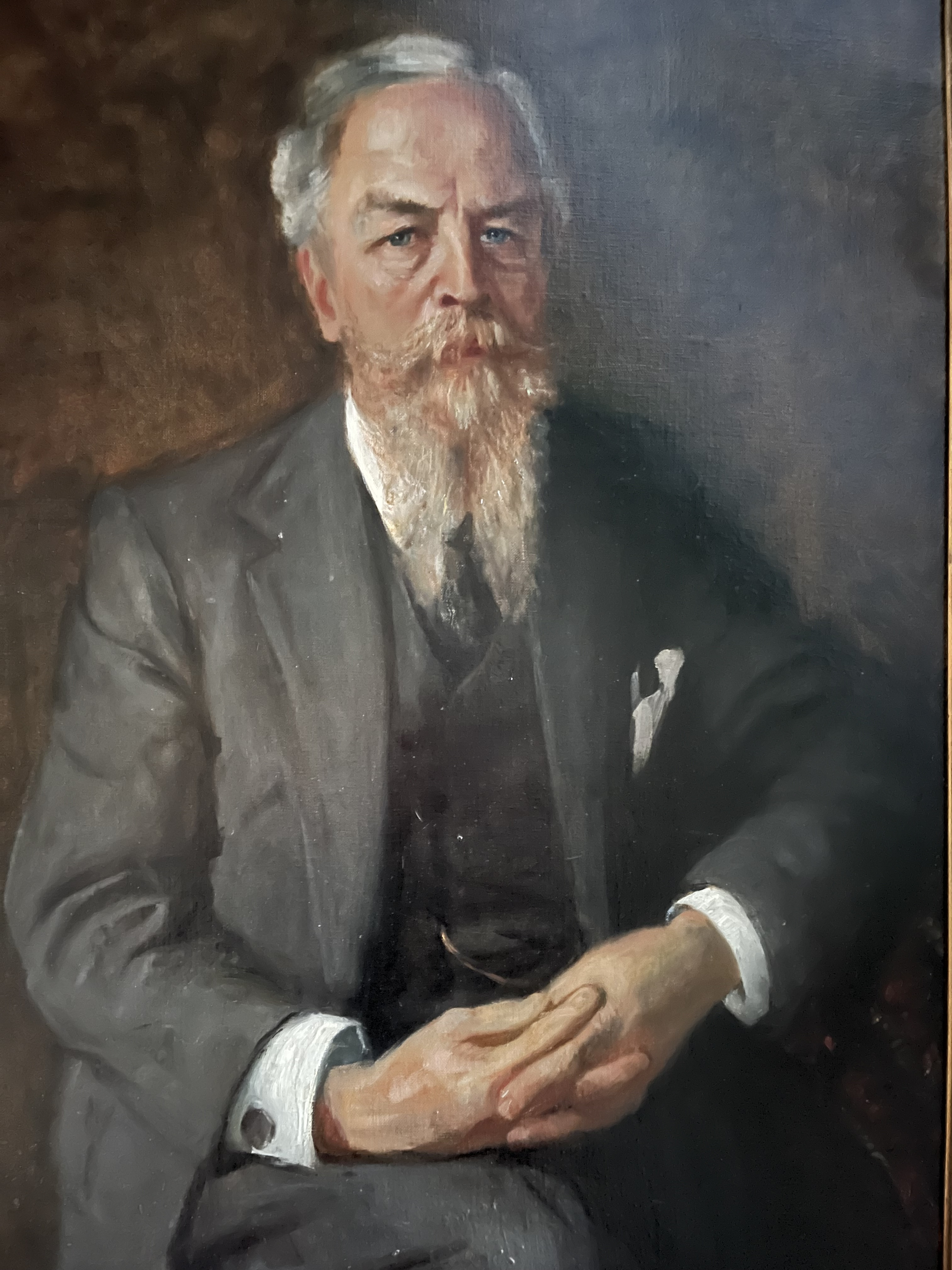
Painting of Paul Ernst at the age of his retirement as Professor of Pathology at the University of Heidelberg

He wrote a thoughtful contemporary reflection on the importance of Virchow's work on cellular pathology. Sixty-two students wrote dissertations under his supervision, originating from Switzerland, Russia, Poland, Germany, Austria, Romania and even New Zealand. Six of them eventually became professors: Heinrich Zangger (1874–1957), Felix Nager (1877–1959), Hans Hunziker (1878–1941), Karl Henschen, Willy Knoll, Emil Looser. He died in 1937 at the age of 78 in Heidelberg; His urn is buried in the family grave Privatfriedhof Hohe Promenade in Zurich.

== Other sources ==
- Paul Ernst (1926): Das morphologische Bedurfnis. Die Naturwissenschaften 1926;14:1075-1080
- Paul Ernst (1931): Struktur und function. Verhandlungen des 25. Kongresses der Deutschen Orthopaedischen Gesellschaft 1931:15-31
- Paul Ernst (1936): Lebenslauf von Dr. Paul Ernst, inaktiver ordentlicher Professor in Heidelberg. 18 S.: Medizinhistorisches Institut der Universitaet Zurich
- Neue Zürcher Zeitung: Kleine Chronik zu Paul Ernsts 70. Geburtstag. 22.04-1922
- Alexander Schmincke (1929): Zum 70. geburtstag von Paul Ernst, emer. Professor der Pathologie in Heidelberg. In Munchener Wochenschrift 76; 674
- Ludwig Aschoff (1938): Paul Ernst. in Zieglers Beitrage 100 (3)386-387
