= Chiari malformation =

Structural defect in the cerebellum of the brain

- Other names: Hindbrain herniation
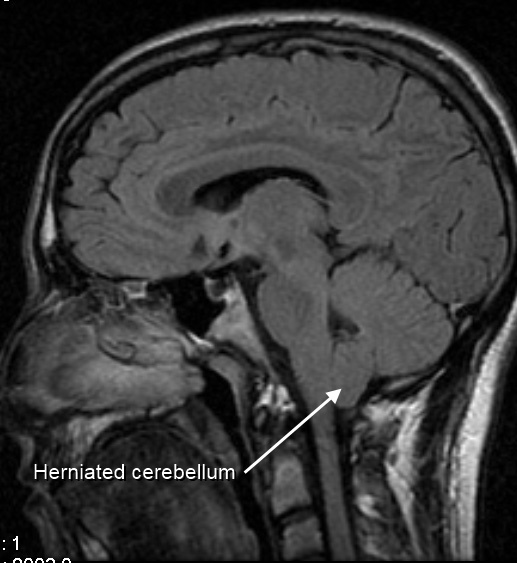
- A sagittal FLAIR MRI scan, from a patient with an Arnold–Chiari malformation, demonstrating tonsillar herniation of 7 mm.
- Pronunciation: /kiˈɑːri/ kee-AR-ee
- Specialty: Neurosurgery
- Complications: Hydrocephalus, spina bifida, syringomyelia, tethered cord syndrome.
- Types: I, II, III, IV
- Treatment: Decompressive surgery
- Prognosis: varies by type-see below
- Frequency: 1 in 100 (type I) (Note: 1 in 1000 have symptomatic type I CM, but 1 in 100 meet the radiological criteria)
- Named after: Hans Chiari; Julius Arnold

In neurology, the Chiari malformation (/kiˈɑːri/ kee-AR-ee; CM) is a structural defect in the cerebellum, characterized by a downward displacement of one or both cerebellar tonsils through the foramen magnum (the opening at the base of the skull).

CMs can cause headaches, difficulty swallowing, vomiting, dizziness, neck pain, unsteady gait, poor hand coordination, numbness and tingling of the hands and feet, and speech problems. Less often, people may experience ringing or buzzing in the ears, weakness, slow heart rhythm, fast heart rhythm, curvature of the spine (scoliosis) related to spinal cord impairment, abnormal breathing such as in central sleep apnea, and, in severe cases, paralysis. CM can sometimes lead to non-communicating hydrocephalus as a result of obstruction of cerebrospinal fluid (CSF) outflow. The CSF outflow is caused by phase difference in outflow and influx of blood in the vasculature of the brain.

The malformation is named after the Austrian pathologist Hans Chiari. A type II CM is also known as an Arnold–Chiari malformation after Chiari and German pathologist Julius Arnold.

== Signs and symptoms ==
Findings are due to brainstem and lower cranial nerve dysfunction. The onset of symptoms is less likely to be present during adulthood in most patients. Younger children generally have a substantially different presentation of clinical symptoms from older children. Younger children are more likely to have a more rapid neurological degeneration with profound brainstem dysfunction over several days.

Headache is the most common symptom in those with Chiari malformation type 1 (in which only the cerebellar tonsils descend below the foramen magnum). This headache is usually occipital or sub-occipital in location (but may also present in other cranial areas), is usually dull or throbbing and is characteristically associated with Valsalva maneuvers (such as bearing down, coughing, sneezing, bending over, or forcefully exhaling against a closed airway). A tension headache is also a common repetitive sign before diagnosis.

Symptoms that may be due to Chiari malformations include:

- Neurogenic dysphagia: Difficulty swallowing.
- Cyanosis: Bluish discoloration of skin while feeding.
- Weak crying
- Facial weakness
- Aspiration
- Headaches aggravated by Valsalva maneuvers
- Tinnitus (ringing in the ears)
- Lhermitte's sign (electrical sensation that runs down the back and into the limbs)
- Vertigo (dizziness)
- Nausea
- Schmahmann's syndrome
- Nystagmus (irregular eye movements; typically, so-called "downbeat nystagmus")
- Facial pain
- Muscle weakness
- Impaired gag reflex
- Dysphagia (difficulty swallowing)
- Restless leg syndrome
- Sleep apnea
- Sleep disorders
- Impaired coordination
- Severe cases may develop all the symptoms and signs of a bulbar palsy
- Paralysis due to pressure at the Cervico-medullary junction may progress in a so-called "clockwise" fashion, affecting the right arm, then the right leg, then the left leg, and finally the left arm; or the opposite way around.
- Papilledema on fundoscopic exam due to increased intracranial pressure
- Pupillary dilation
- Dysautonomia: tachycardia (rapid heart), syncope (fainting), polydipsia (extreme thirst), chronic fatigue
- Apnea: Sudden pause of breathing, usually during sleep.
- Opisthotonos: Spasm of the head which causes the head to arch backwards. More common in infants than in adults.
- Stridor

The blockage of cerebrospinal fluid (CSF) flow may also cause a syrinx to form, eventually leading to syringomyelia. Central cord symptoms such as hand weakness, dissociated sensory loss, and, in severe cases, paralysis may occur.

=== Syringomyelia ===
Syringomyelia is most often a chronic progressive degenerative disorder characterized by a fluid-filled cyst located in the spinal cord. However, there can also be cases where the syrinx, in terms of size and extent of symptoms, actually stays stable throughout a lifetime. Syringomyelia symptoms include pain, weakness, numbness, and stiffness in the back, shoulders, arms or legs. Other symptoms include headaches, the inability to feel changes in temperature, sweating, sexual dysfunction, and loss of bowel and bladder control. It is usually seen in the cervical region but can extend into the medulla oblongata and pons, or it can reach downward into the thoracic or lumbar segments. Syringomyelia is often associated with type I Chiari malformation and is commonly seen between the C-4 and C-6 levels. The exact development of syringomyelia is unknown, but many theories suggest that the herniated tonsils in type I Chiari malformations cause a "plug" to form, which does not allow an outlet of CSF from the brain to the spinal canal. Syringomyelia is present in 25% of patients with type I Chiari malformations.

== Pathophysiology ==
Foramen magnum (shown in red), the hole at the base of the skull

The most common pathophysiological mechanism by which Chiari type I malformations occur is due to a congenitally small posterior fossa. Other pathophysiological mechanisms involve increased intracranial pressure above the foramen magnum, which causes a downward pressure against the cerebellum, thus causing the cerebellar tonsils to displace below the foramen magnum. Such causes include hydrocephalus (an accumulation of cerebrospinal fluid [CSF] around the brain), space occupying lesions in the brain such as tumors, subdural hematomas or other subdural fluid collections, arachnoid cysts, craniosynostosis (early closure of the cranial sutures)(especially of the lambdoid suture), hyperostosis (an excessive growth of bone) (such as craniometaphyseal dysplasia, osteopetrosis). Another pathophysiological mechanism by which Chiari malformations form is by negative pressure or a pulling force from below the foramen magnum, which pulls against the brain, causing the cerebellar tonsils to herniate past the foramen magnum. Causes of this negative or pulling pressure include a tethered cord or an excessively tense Filum terminale, a cerebrospinal fluid leak creating a negative pressure around the spinal cord as the fluid surrounding the cord leaks out, or a CSF-venous fistula, in which the CSF leaks into a nearby vein.

Traumatic brain injury may cause delayed acquired Chiari malformation, but the pathophysiology of this is unknown. This is due to the fact that the condition can go asymptomatic for years and a diagnosis is often led through testing for a variety of symptoms. Additionally, ectopia may be present but asymptomatic until a whiplash injury causes it to become symptomatic. Other conditions linked to Chiari malformations include X-linked vitamin D-resistant rickets, and neurofibromatosis type I.

== Diagnosis ==
Diagnosis is made through a combination of patient history, neurological examination, and medical imaging. Magnetic resonance imaging (MRI) is considered the preferred imaging modality for Chiari malformation. The MRI visualizes neural tissue such as the cerebellar tonsils and spinal cord as well as bone and other soft tissues. CT and CT myelography are other options and were used prior to the advent of MRI, unfortunately the resolution of CT based modalities do not characterize syringomyelia and other neural abnormalities as well.

By convention, the cerebellar tonsil position is measured relative to the basion-opisthion line, using sagittal T1 MRI images or sagittal CT images. The selected cutoff distance for abnormal tonsil position is somewhat arbitrary, as not every person will be symptomatic at a certain amount of tonsil displacement, and the probability of symptoms and syrinx increases with greater displacement; however, greater than 5 mm is the most frequently cited cutoff number, though some consider 3–5 mm to be "borderline"; pathological signs and syrinx may occur beyond that distance. One study showed little difference in cerebellar tonsil position between standard recumbent MRI and upright MRI for patients without a history of whiplash injury. Neuroradiological investigation is used to rule out any intracranial condition that could be responsible for tonsillar herniation first. Neuroradiological diagnostics evaluate the severity of crowding of the neural structures within the posterior cranial fossa and their pressure against the foramen magnum. Chiari 1.5 is a term used when both brainstem and tonsillar herniation through the foramen magnum are present.

The diagnosis of a Chiari II malformation can be made prenatally, through ultrasound.

=== Classification ===
In the late 19th century, Austrian pathologist Hans Chiari described seemingly related anomalies of the hindbrain, the so-called Chiari malformations I, II and III. Later, other investigators added a fourth (Chiari IV) malformation. The scale of severity is rated I–IV, with IV being the most severe. Types III and IV are very rare. Since Dr. Chiari's original descriptions Chiari 0, 1.5, 3.5, and 5 have been described in the medical literature.

==== Types of Chiari malformation ====
Type	Presentation	Clinical Features
0	Syringohydromyelia in the absence of cerebellar tonsillar herniation.	Back pain, leg pain, hand numbness/weakness
I	Herniation of cerebellar tonsils. Tonsillar ectopia below the foramen magnum, with greater than 5 mm below as the most commonly cited cutoff value for abnormal position (although this is considered somewhat controversial). Syringomyelia of cervical or cervicothoracic spinal cord can be seen. Sometimes, the medullary kink and brainstem elongation can be seen. It can be congenital or acquired through trauma. When congenital, it may be asymptomatic during childhood, but often manifests with headaches and cerebellar symptoms. Syndrome of occipitoatlantoaxial hypermobility is an acquired Chiari I malformation in patients with hereditary disorders of connective tissue. Patients who exhibit extreme joint hypermobility and connective tissue weakness as a result of Ehlers–Danlos syndrome or Marfan syndrome are susceptible to instabilities of the craniocervical junction; thus they are at risk for acquiring a Chiari malformation.	Headache, neck pain, unsteady gait usually during childhood
1.5	In addition to tonsillar ectopia, patients with this entity also have caudal descent of the brainstem. A significant proportion of these patients require a second surgery as a result of persistent syringomyelia.	Headache and neck pain, similar to Chiari I
II	This is the only type, also known as an "Arnold–Chiari" malformation. As opposed to the less-pronounced tonsillar herniation seen with Chiari I, there is a larger cerebellar vermian displacement. Low-lying torcular herophili (confluence of sinuses), tectal beaking, and hydrocephalus with consequent clival hypoplasia are classic anatomic associations. Usually accompanied by a lumbar or lumbosacral myelomeningocele, with tonsillar herniation below the foramen magnum. Colpocephaly may be seen due to the associated neural tube defect.	Paralysis below the spinal bifida defect
III	Associated with an occipital encephalocele containing a variety of abnormal neuroectodermal tissues as well as possible herniation of elements of cerebellum, brainstem, and occipital lobe. Syringomyelia, tethered cord, and hydrocephalus may also be seen.	Abundant neurological deficits
3.5	In 1894, Giuseppe Muscatello described what is believed to be the only case of an occipitocervical encephalocele with a communication to the stomach.	Not compatible with life.
IV	Characterized by a lack of cerebellar development, in which the cerebellum and brainstem lie within the posterior fossa with no relation to the foramen magnum. Equivalent to primary cerebellar agenesis.	Not compatible with life
V	Characterized by the absence of cerebellar development and occipital lobe ectopia into the foramen magnum. This rare entity has two described cases in the medical literature, both associated with myelomeningocele. This has sparked controversy, given the proposed mechanism of this syndrome. Experts in neurosurgery disagree if this is truly a separate entity or just a part of the spectrum of Chiari 2 malformations.	

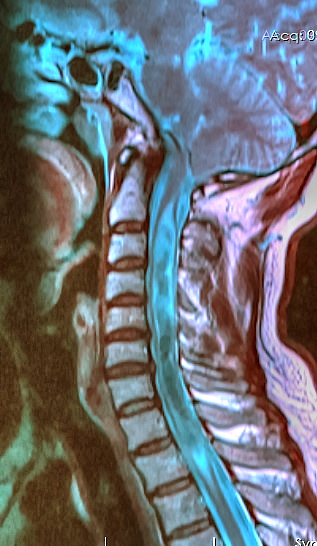
Syringomyelia associated with Chiari malformation

Other conditions sometimes causally associated with Chiari malformation include hydrocephalus, syringomyelia, spinal curvature, tethered spinal cord syndrome, and connective tissue disorders such as Ehlers–Danlos syndrome and Marfan syndrome.

Chiari malformation is the most frequently used term for this set of conditions. The use of the term "Arnold–Chiari malformation" has fallen somewhat out of favor over time, although it is used to refer to the type II malformation. Current sources use "Chiari malformation" to describe its four specific types, reserving the term "Arnold–Chiari" for type II only. Some sources still use "Arnold–Chiari" for all four types.

Chiari malformation type 1 emerges during skull and brain development, often without symptoms until late childhood or adulthood. In contrast, the pediatric forms include type 2 and type 3, which are present from birth, making them congenital conditions.

Chiari malformation or Arnold–Chiari malformation should not be confused with Budd–Chiari syndrome, a hepatic condition also named for Hans Chiari.

In Pseudo-Chiari Malformation, leaking of CSF may cause displacement of the cerebellar tonsils and similar symptoms sufficient to be mistaken for a Chiari I malformation.

== Treatment ==
While there is no current cure, the treatments for Chiari malformation are surgery and management of symptoms. Treatment is directed at the occurrence of clinical symptoms rather than the radiological findings. The presence of a syrinx is known to give specific signs and symptoms that vary from dysesthetic sensations to algothermal dissociation to spasticity and paresis. These are important indications that decompressive surgery is needed for patients with Chiari Malformation Type II. Type II patients have severe brainstem damage and rapidly diminishing neurological response.

Decompressive surgery involves removing the lamina of the first and sometimes the second or third cervical vertebrae and part of the occipital bone of the skull to relieve pressure. The flow of spinal fluid may be augmented by a shunt. The surgery may involve the opening of the dura mater to allow decompression of the brain. A dural graft may be applied to cover the expanded posterior fossa. In those with type I Chiari malformations (especially those with a syrinx), a bone resection with duraplasty (compared to a bone resection without duraplasty) is associated with greater symptom relief and has a higher rate of symptomatic remission, and a lower need for re-operation. However, a bone resection with duraplasty was also associated with a higher rate of surgical complications. Re-operation may be needed in up to 6.8% of patients, and possible causes of re-operation include incomplete decompression and dural scarring. Other complications that are possible in surgical repair of type I Chiari malformations include an aseptic meningitis due to irritation from the dural grafts, which is seen in 32% of cases. Rates of aseptic meningitis are lower with Dural allografts or autografts as compared to bovine or synthetic grafts. Another complication includes a CSF leak, which may occur in up to 21% of people post-operatively.

A small number of neurological surgeons believe that detethering the spinal cord as an alternate approach relieves the compression of the brain against the skull opening (foramen magnum), obviating the need for decompression surgery and associated trauma. However, this approach is significantly less documented in the medical literature, with reports on only a handful of patients. The alternative spinal surgery is also not without risk.

Complications of decompression surgery can arise. They include bleeding, damage to structures in the brain and spinal canal, meningitis, CSF fistulas, occipito-cervical instability, and pseudomeningocele. Rare post-operative complications include hydrocephalus and brainstem compression by retroflexion of odontoid. Also, an extended CVD created by a wide opening and big duroplasty can cause a cerebellar "slump". This complication needs to be corrected by cranioplasty.

In certain cases, irreducible compression of the brainstem occurs from in front (anteriorly or ventral), resulting in a smaller posterior fossa and associated Chiari malformation. In these cases, an anterior decompression is required. The most commonly used approach is to operate through the mouth (transoral) to remove the bone compressing the brainstem, typically the odontoid. This results in decompressing the brainstem and therefore gives more room for the cerebellum, thus decompressing the Chiari malformation. Arnold Menzes, MD, is the neurosurgeon who pioneered this approach in the 1970s at the University of Iowa. Between 1984 and 2008 (the MR imaging era), 298 patients with irreducible ventral compression of the brainstem and Chiari type I malformation underwent a transoral approach for ventral cervicomedullary decompression at the University of Iowa. The results have been excellent, resulting in improved brainstem function and resolution of the Chiari malformation in the majority of patients.

== Epidemiology ==
The incidence of congenital Chiari I malformation was previously believed to be in the range of one per 1000 births, but is likely much higher. Women are three times more likely than men to have a congenital Chiari malformation. Type II malformations are more prevalent in people of Celtic descent. A study using upright MRI found cerebellar tonsillar ectopia in 23% of adults with headache from motor-vehicle-accident head trauma. Upright MRI was more than twice as sensitive as standard MRI, likely because gravity affects cerebellar position.

Cases of congenital Chiari malformation may be explained by evolutionary and genetic factors. Typically, an infant's brain weighs around 400g at birth and triples to 1100-1400g by age 11. At the same time, the cranium triples in volume from 500 cm^{3} to 1500 cm^{3} to accommodate the growing brain. During human evolution, the skull underwent numerous changes to accommodate the growing brain. The evolutionary changes included increased size and shape of the skull, decreased basal angle, and basicranial length. These modifications resulted in a significant reduction of the size of the posterior fossa in modern humans. In normal adults, the posterior fossa comprises 27% of the total intracranial space, while in adults with Chiari Type I, it is only 21%. H. neanderthalensis had platycephalic (flattened) skulls. Some cases of Chiari are associated with platybasia (flattening of the skull base).

== History ==
The history of Chiari malformation:

- 1883: Cleland was the first to describe Chiari II or Arnold–Chiari malformation on his report of a child with spina bifida, hydrocephalus, and anatomical alterations of the cerebellum and brainstem.
- 1891: Hans Chiari, a Viennese pathologist, described the case of a 17-year-old female with elongation of the tonsils into cone-shaped projections which accompany the medulla and are crammed into the spinal canal.
- 1907: Schwalbe and Gredig, pupils of German pathologist Julius Arnold, described four cases of meningomyelocele and alterations in the brainstem and cerebellum, and gave the name "Arnold–Chiari" to these malformations.
- 1932: Van Houweninge Graftdijk was the first to report the surgical treatment of Chiari malformations. All patients died from surgery or postoperative complications.
- 1935: Russell and Donald suggested that decompression of the spinal cord at the foramen magnum might facilitate the CSF circulation.
- 1940: Gustafson and Oldberg diagnosed Chiari malformation with syringomyelia.
- 1974: Bloch et al. described the tonsils position to be classified between 7 mm and 8 mm below cerebellum.
- 1985: Aboulezz used MRI for discovery of extension

== Society and culture ==
The condition was brought to the mainstream on the series CSI: Crime Scene Investigation in the tenth-season episode "Internal Combustion" on February 4, 2010.

=== Notable people ===
- Rosanne Cash – U.S. singer-songwriter; daughter of Johnny Cash
- Julia Clukey – U.S. luge competitor for Team USA in 2010 Vancouver Winter Olympics
- Joanna David – British television and stage actress
- J. B. Holmes – U.S. professional golfer
- Marissa Irwin – U.S. fashion model with Chiari secondary to Ehlers–Danlos syndrome
- Bobby Jones – U.S. World Golf Hall of Fame golfer and founder of the Augusta National Golf Club
- Allysa Seely – U.S. Gold Medalist at the 2016 Summer Paralympics in the paratriathlon
- Leah Shapiro – U.S. drummer for the band Black Rebel Motorcycle Club
- Michelle Stilwell – Canadian wheelchair racer and politician
- Rachid Taha – Algerian singer
- Sabre Norris – Australian skateboarder and surfer

== See also ==
- Hypermobility spectrum disorder
