= Tuber of vermis =

Part of the cerebellum

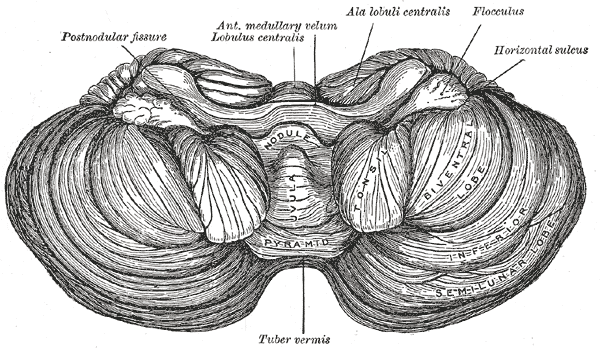
- Anterior view of the cerebellum. (Tuber labeled at center bottom.)

Details

Identifiers
- Latin: tuber vermis
- NeuroNames: 676

The tuber of vermis, the most posterior division of the inferior vermis, is of small size, and laterally spreads out into the large inferior semilunar lobules, which comprise at least two-thirds of the inferior surface of the hemisphere.

== Additional images ==
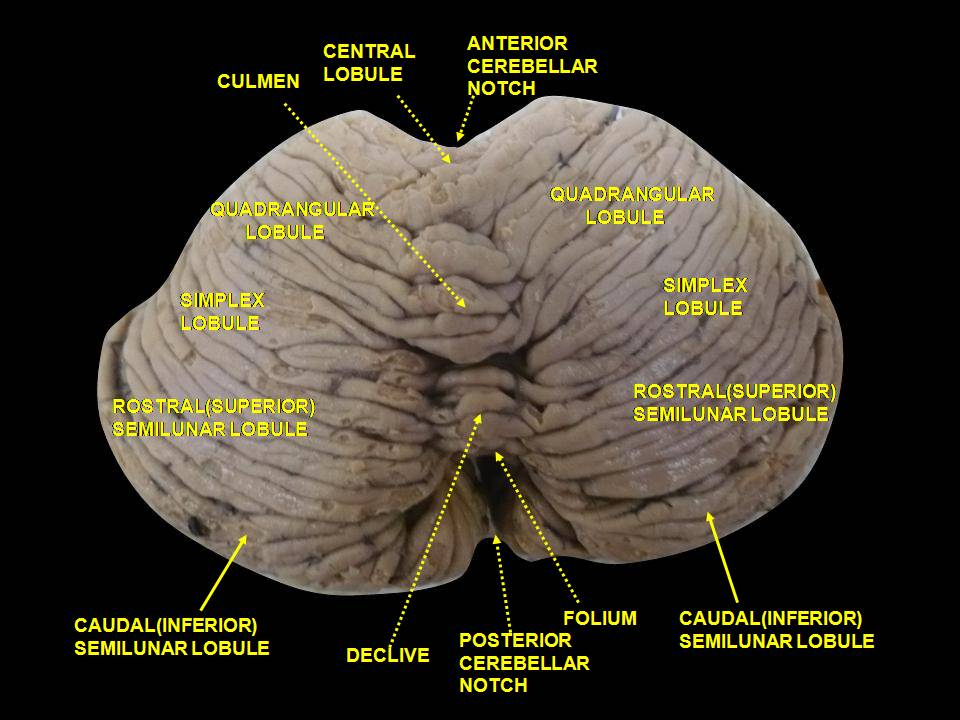
Cerebellum. Superior surface.

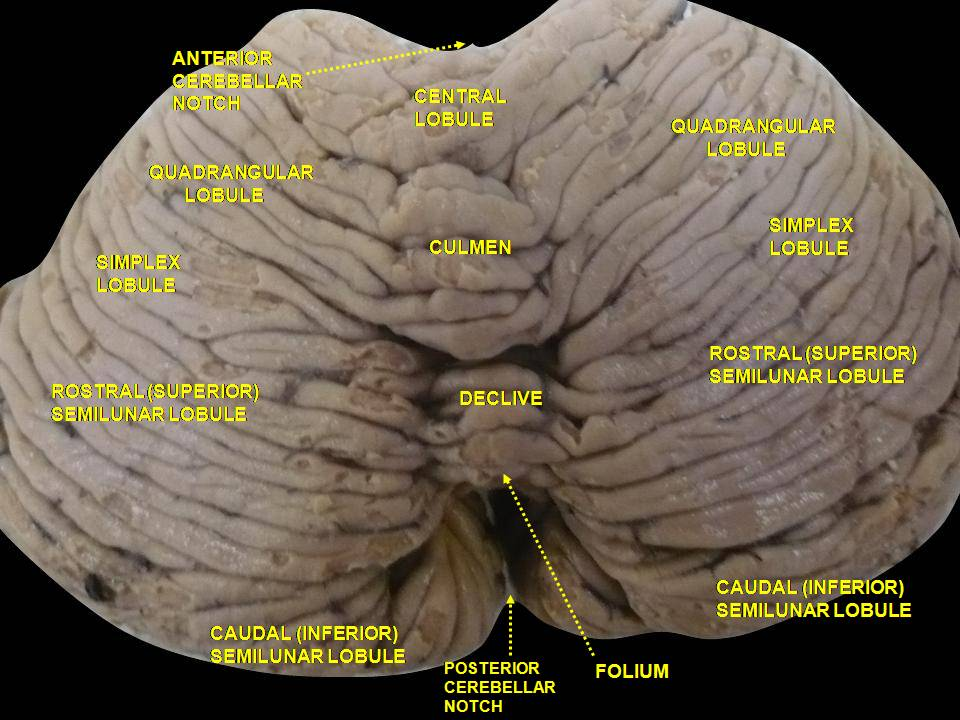
Cerebellum. Superior surface.

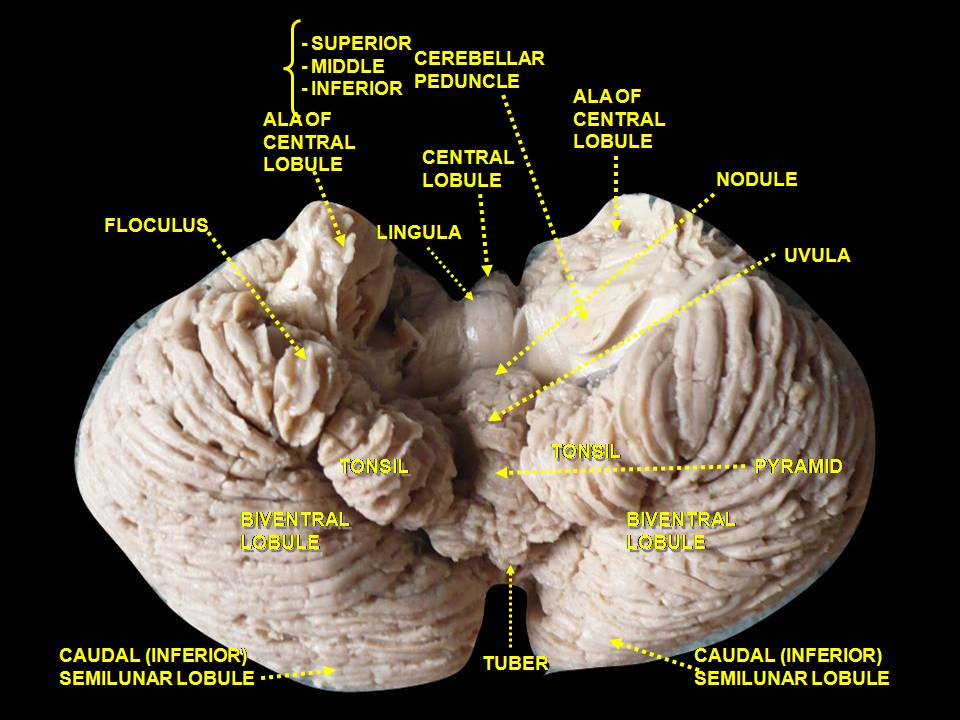
Cerebellum. Inferior surface.

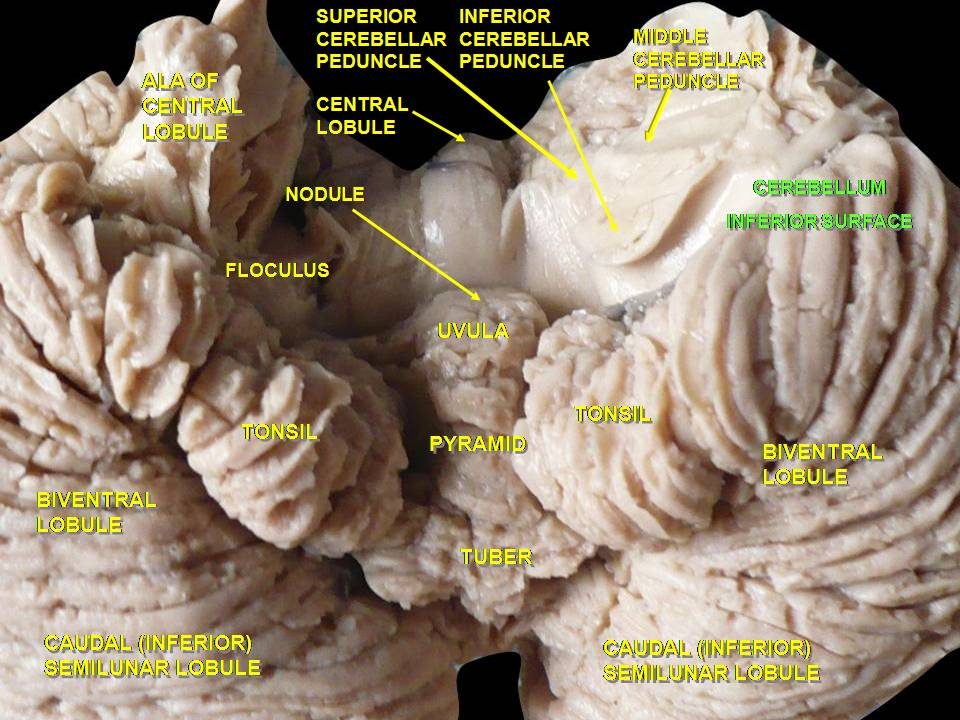
Cerebellum. Inferior surface.
