= Volutin granules =

Volutin granules are an intracytoplasmic storage form of complexed inorganic polyphosphate, the production of which is used as one of the identifying criteria when attempting to isolate Corynebacterium diphtheriae on Löffler's medium. Polyphosphate granules display the metachromatic effect, appearing red when stained with methylene blue. Volutin granules can also be found in the cytoplasm of Saccharomyces, a genus of ascomycete fungi. They are characteristic for different species and depend on the age and condition of the culture.

Volutin granules (metachromatic or Babes-Ernst granules) are highly refractive, strongly basophilic bodies consisting of polymetaphosphate. The eponymous name was given in honour of the discoverers Paul Ernst and Victor Babes. They appear reddish when stained with polychrome methylene blue or toluidine blue (metachromasia). Special staining techniques such as Albert's or Neisser's demonstrate the granules more clearly. Volutin granules are characteristically present in diphtheria bacilli. Their function is uncertain. They have been considered to represent a reserve of energy and phosphate for cell metabolism but they are most frequent in cells grown under conditions of nutritional deficiency and tend to disappear when the deficient nutrients are supplied.
