= Vallecula =

Vallecula is an anatomic term for a crevice, depression, or furrow in something. There are a variety of valleculae in the human body, including one between the hemispheres of the brain, on the inferior surface of the cerebellum, in which the medulla oblongata is located (vallecula of cerebellum). Other common valleculae are: in the nail matrix, and in the throat.

Used alone, the term "vallecula" usually refers to the epiglottic vallecula.

"Vallecula" comes from the Latin word valles, meaning "valley", and is in the diminutive form of the word, so a vallecula is literally a "little valley".
