= Hans Chiari =

Austrian pathologist (1851–1916)

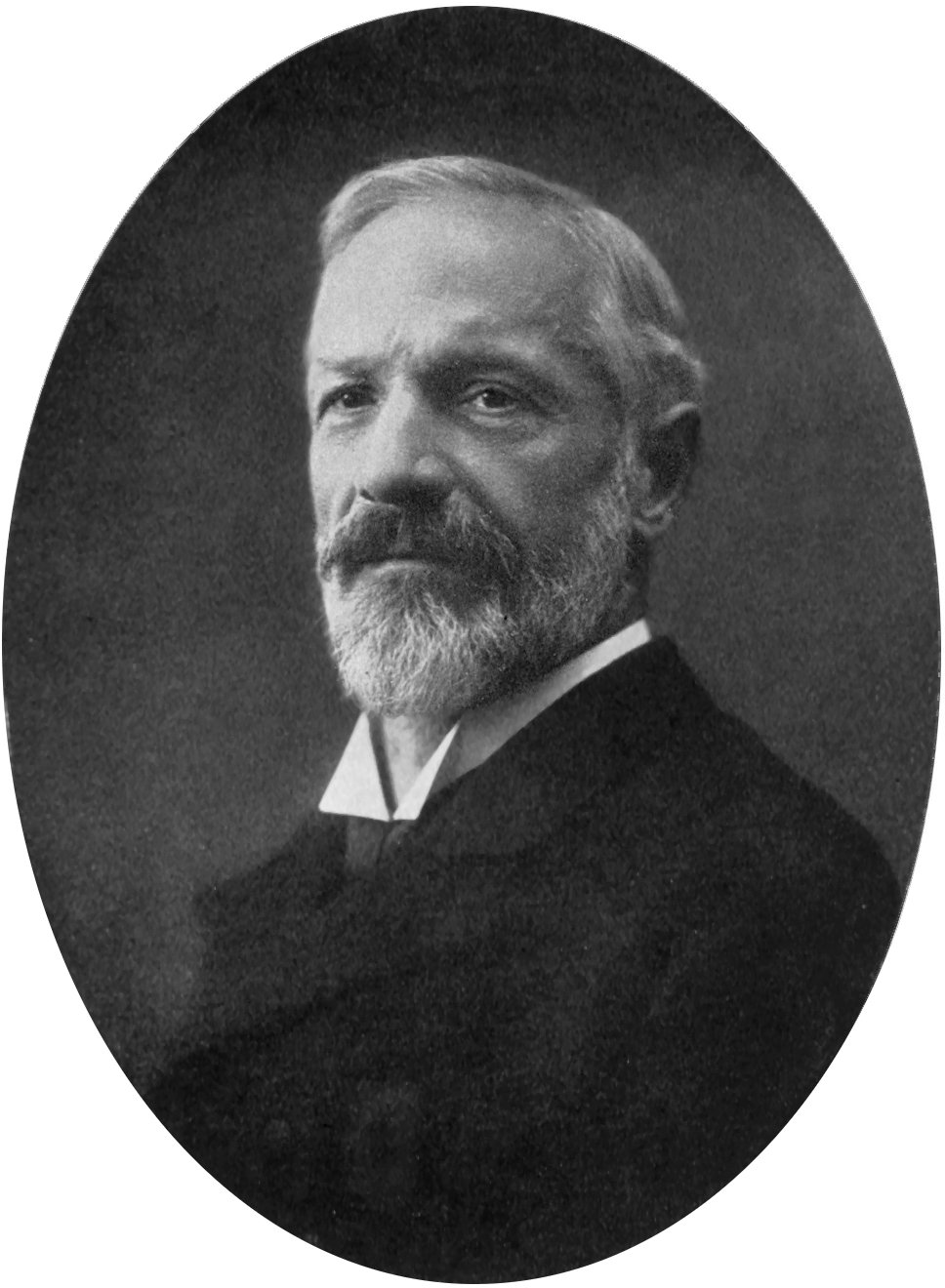
- Hans Chiari
- Born: 4 September 1851; Vienna, Austrian Empire
- Died: 6 May 1916 (aged 64); Strasbourg, German Empire
- Known for: Arnold–Chiari malformation Budd–Chiari syndrome Chiari network
- Father: Johann Baptist Chiari
- Relatives: Ottokar Chiari (brother)
- Scientific career
- Fields: Pathology

Hans Chiari (/kiˈɑːri/ kee-AR-ee, Austrian German: [hans ˈki̯aːri]; 4 September 1851 − 6 May 1916) was a pathologist from Vienna, Austria-Hungary. He was the son of gynecologist Johann Baptist Chiari (1817–1854) and the brother of otorhinolaryngologist Ottokar Chiari (1853–1918).

== Biography ==
Chiari studied medicine in Vienna, where he was an assistant to Karl Freiherr von Rokitansky (1804–1878) and Richard Ladislaus Heschl (1824–1881). In 1878 he received his habilitation in pathological anatomy, and within a few years became an associate professor at the University of Prague. At Prague he was also superintendent of the pathological-anatomical museum. In 1906 he relocated to the University of Strasbourg as a professor of pathological anatomy.

Chiari's research dealt largely with postmortem examinations, and most of his numerous writings are the result of autopsies. In the 1890s he described a condition involving deformities of the cerebellum, and brainstem in children with herniation of the spinal cord. The phenomenon was later to become known as the "Arnold–Chiari malformation", named after Chiari and German pathologist, Julius Arnold (1835–1915). The malformation was given its name in 1907 by two of Dr. Arnold's students.

Another medical term named after Chiari is the Budd–Chiari syndrome, which is ascites and cirrhosis of the liver caused by an obstruction of the hepatic veins due to a blood clot. It is named in conjunction with British physician George Budd (1808–1882). Lastly, Chiari is also famous for describing the "Chiari network", an embryonic remnant found in the right atrium, first published in 1897.

== Publications ==
- "Über Veränderungen des Kleinhirns infolge von Hydrocephalie des Grosshirns", Deutsche medicinische Wochenschrift, Berlin, 1891, 17: 1172–1175 – On cerebellar changes caused by hydrocephalus of the cerebrum.
- "Über Veränderungen des Kleinhirns, der Pons und der Medulla oblongata, infolge von congenitaler Hydrocephalie des Grosshirns", Denkschriften der Akademie der Wissenschaften in Wien, 1895, 63: 71. – On changes to the cerebellum, pons and the medulla oblongata, caused by hydrocephalus of the cerebrum.

== See also ==
- Pathology
- List of pathologists
