= Uvula of cerebellum =

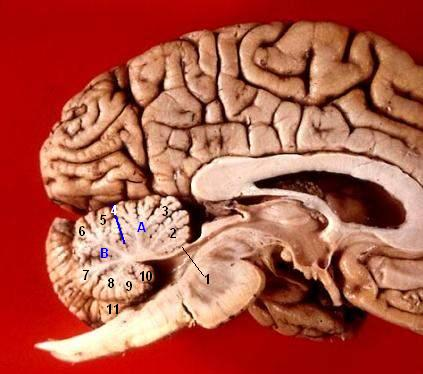
- Human brain midsagittal view. Uvula is #9.

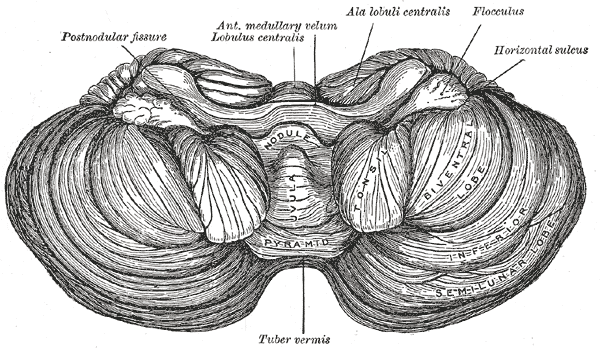
- Anterior view of the cerebellum. (Uvula labeled at center.)

Details

Identifiers
- Latin: uvula vermis
- NeuroNames: 678
- TA98: A14.1.07.221
- TA2: 5831
- FMA: 83883

The uvula (uvular lobe) forms a considerable portion of the inferior vermis; it is separated on either side from the tonsil by a sulcus, the vallecula of the cerebellum, at the bottom of which it is connected to the tonsil by a ridge of gray matter, indented on its surface by shallow furrows, and hence called the furrowed band.

== Additional images ==
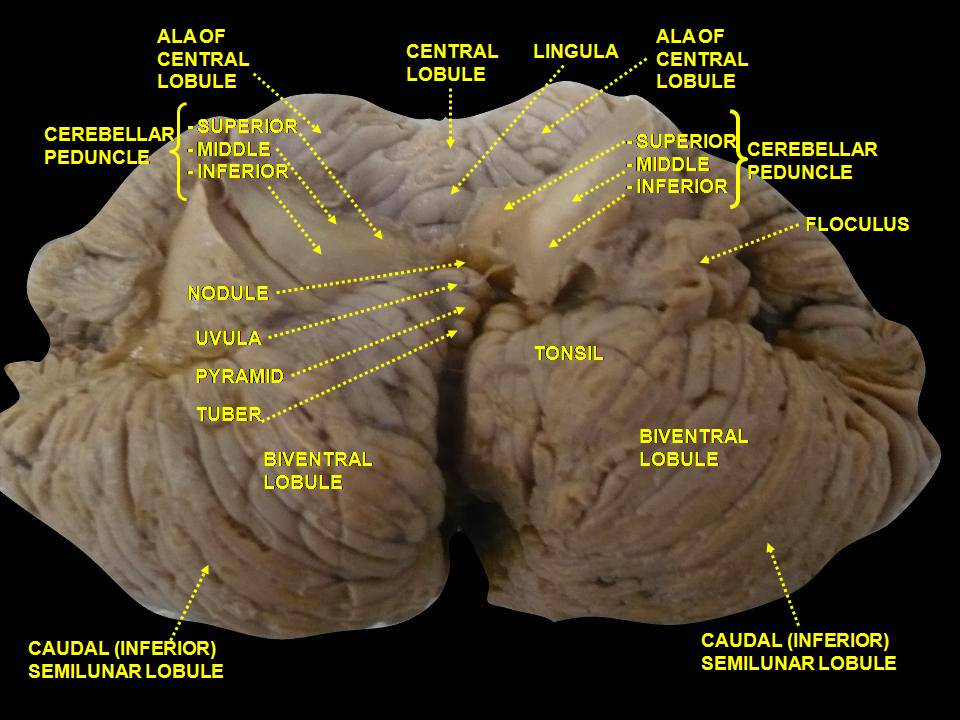
Cerebellum. Inferior surface.

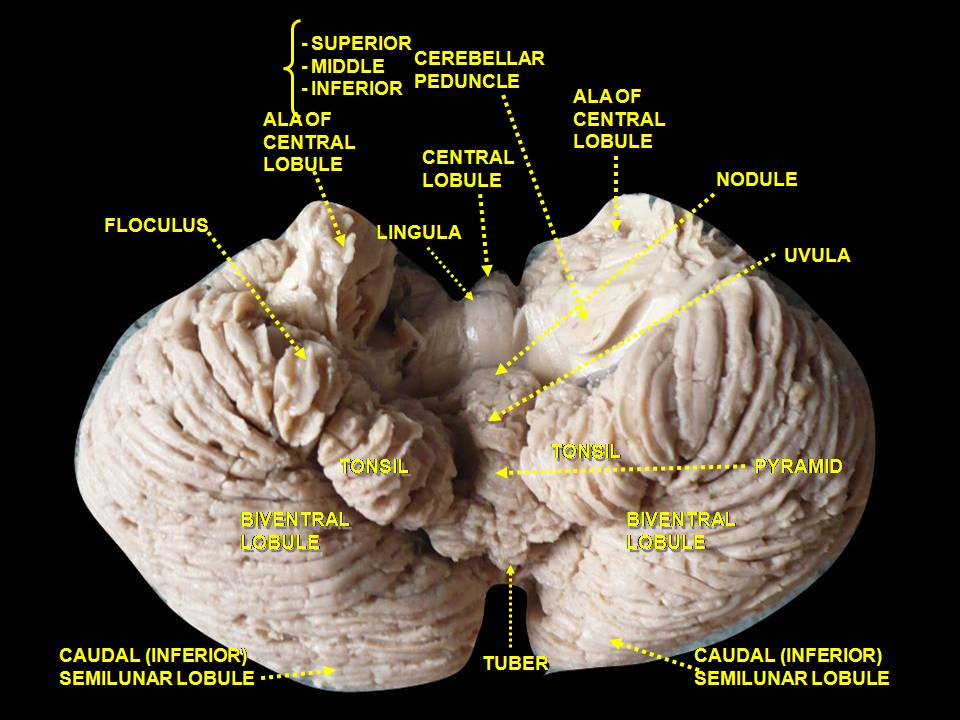
Cerebellum. Inferior surface.

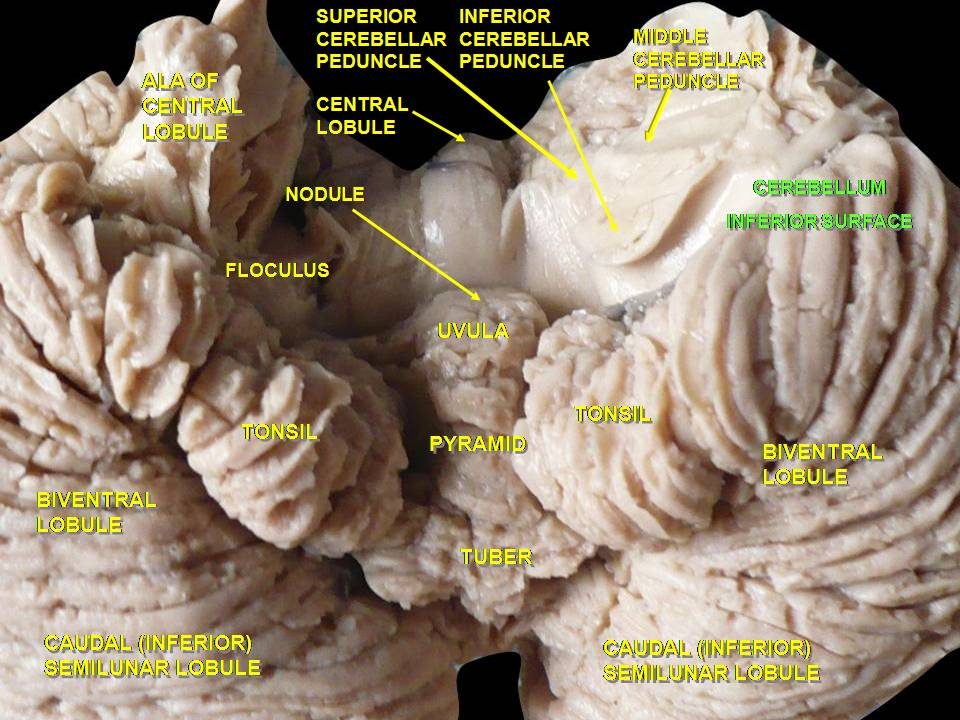
Cerebellum. Inferior surface.
