= Nikolai Lunin (scientist) =

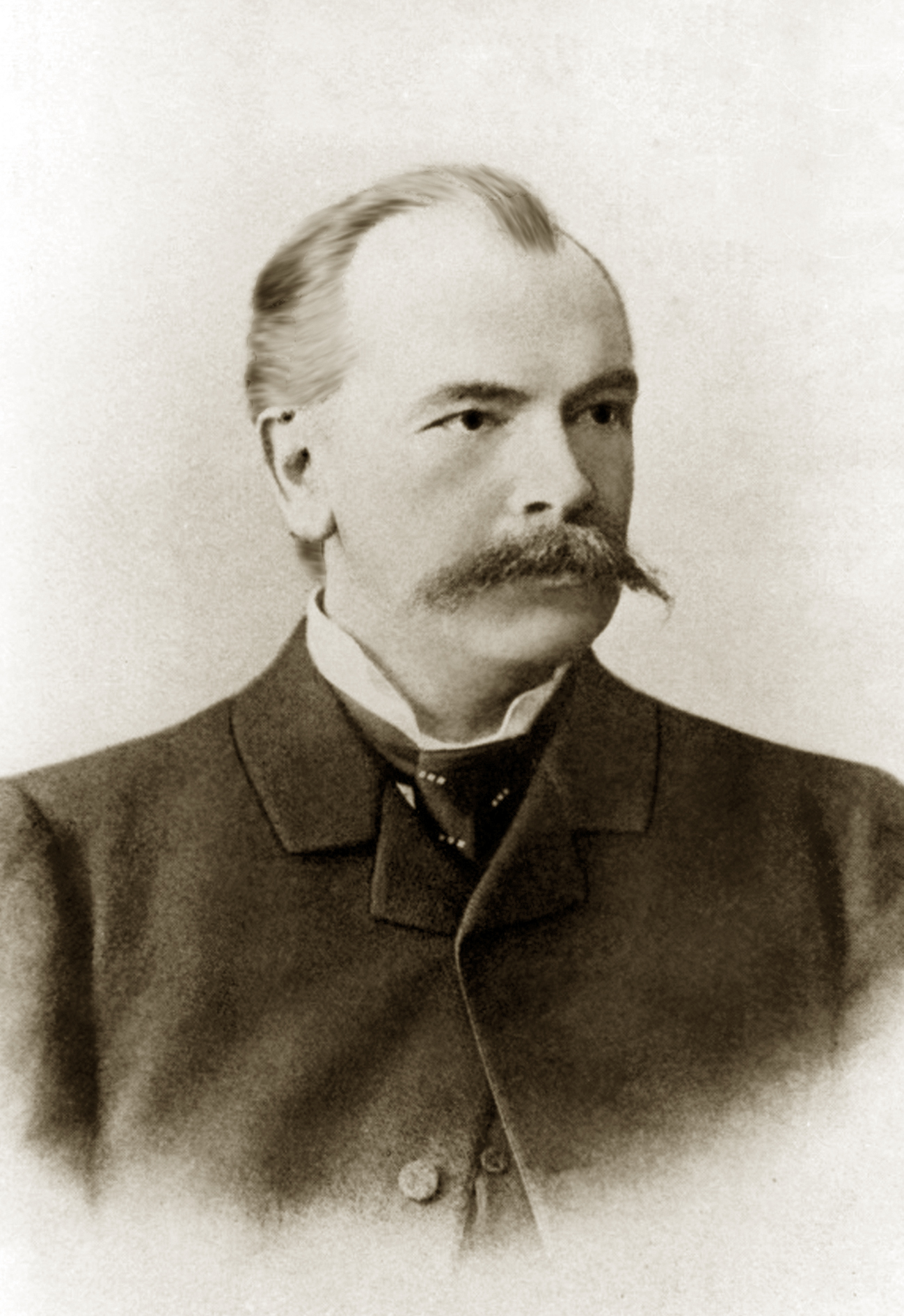
Nikolai Lunin

Nikolai Ivanovich Lunin (21 May 1854 – 18 June 1937) was a Russian Empire and later Soviet scientist who was the first to discover the existence of vitamins.

As a student in Basel, he fed mice on a diet of proteins, fats, sugar, salts and water, but they died. He concluded that in addition to casein, fat, milk sugar and salts, milk must contain other substances that are indispensable for nutrition.

His dissertation was published abroad in 1881, however other scientists were unable to replicate his work. Lunin had used cane sugar, but others used ill-purified milk sugar, which turned out to contain vitamin B, which saved the mice. Frederick Gowland Hopkins, in his Nobel Prize lecture, references Lunin's work.

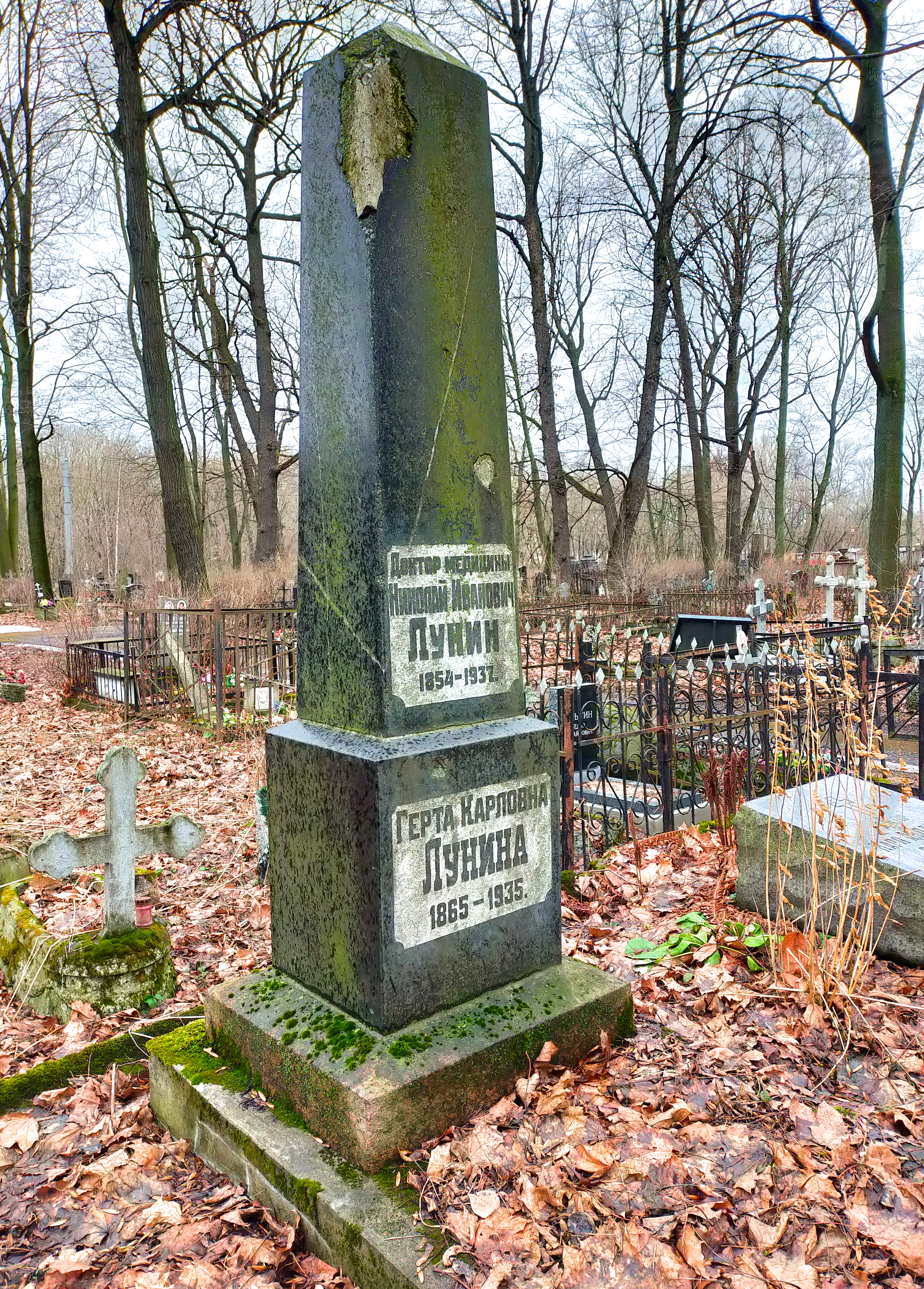
Lunin's monument

Lunin is buried at Volkovo Cemetery in St Petersburg, next to his wife, who died two years before him.
