= Germ theory's key 19th century figures =

In the mid to late nineteenth century, scientific patterns emerged which contradicted the widely held miasma theory of disease. These findings led medical science to what we now know as the germ theory of disease. Germ theory proposes that microscopic pathogens capable of replication (bacteria, viruses, etc.) are the cause of particular illnesses in both humans and animals. Prior to germ theory, people knew that diseases spread between humans, especially where many congregate, such as in armies and cities; but it was widely thought that this happened primarily due to exposure to unhealthy air (miasma) emanating from the sick or from people in general, as well as from swamps and conditions strongly influenced by climatic circumstances. Though there were a few early thinkers that suggested the possibility of microorganisms causing disease, it was not until the mid to late nineteenth century when several noteworthy figures made discoveries which would provide more efficient practices and tools to prevent the spread of communicable disease.

== Contagion by means beyond miasma ==
Led by stark statistical patterns, Ignaz Semmelweis and John Snow independently conceived of contagion of disease by means other than noxious air (miasma). Similarly, Florence Nightingale greatly decreased the prevalence of infection by implementing better hygienic practices.

=== Ignaz Semmelweis ===
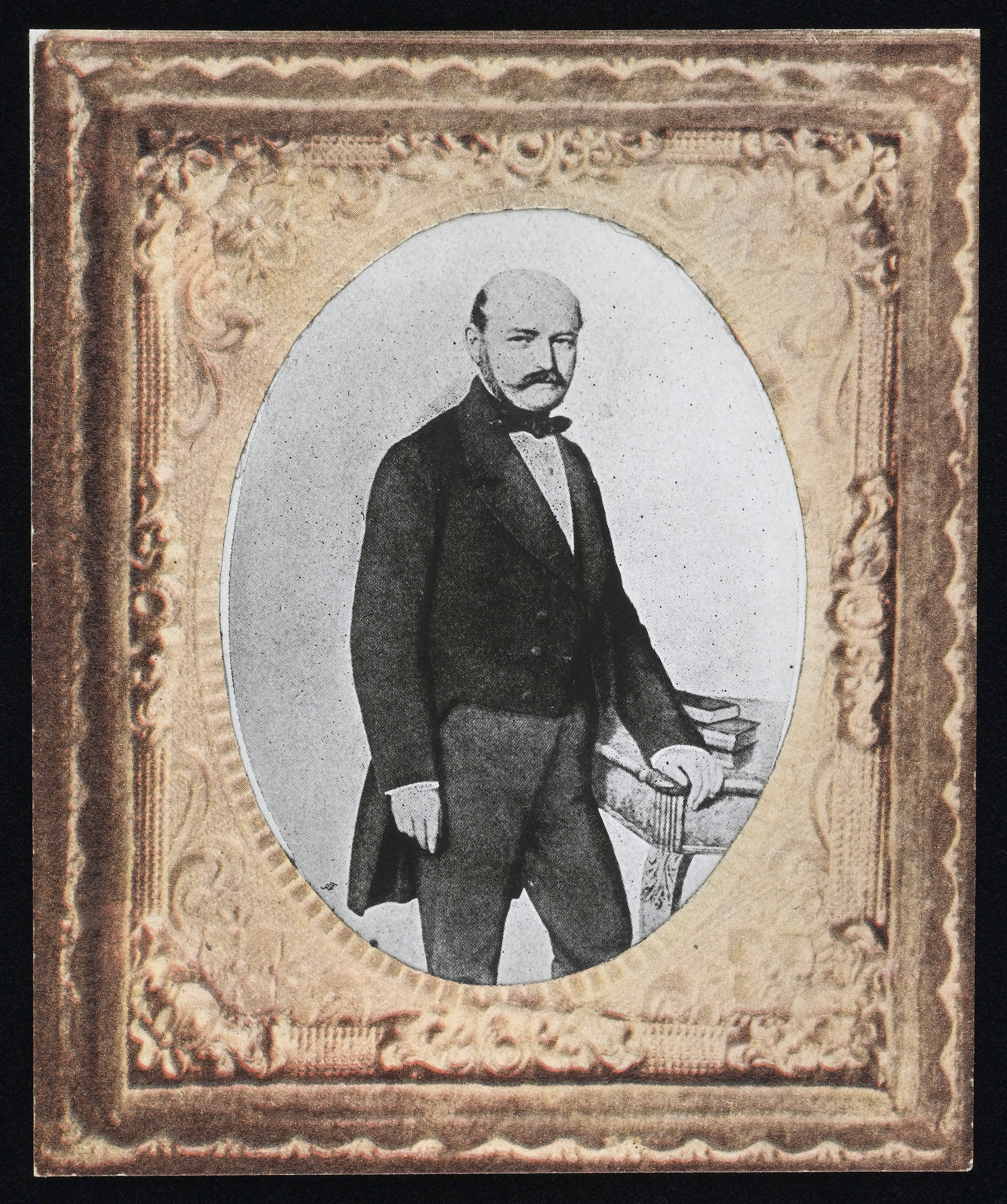
Portrait of Ignaz Semmelweis

Ignaz Semmelweis was obstetrician who began assisting Johann Klein at Vienna General Hospital's first two maternity clinics (also called a "lying-in wards") in 1846. Semmelweis became concerned with the number of women dying from a febrile illness called puerperal fever, colloquially referred to as "childbed fever." Childbed fever often occurred in the first few days after giving birth. This condition caused fever, intense abdominal pains, profound weakness, and ultimately death for many who acquired it. In the 1840s, when Semmelweis began his career in obstetrics, an expectant mother entering a maternity ward had a 10-20% chance of dying from this particular illness or complication. For some areas in Europe, the figure was greater with an estimated death rate as high as 30%. Childbed fever was an epidemic at the time which made labor and delivery a major cause of distress for families.

One of the clinics he oversaw was run by physicians and medical students, while the other was operated by midwives. Semmelweis noticed the midwife clinic had a significantly lower mortality rate. This compelled him to study the techniques and practices of both clinics in great detail to find the distinguishing factors between the two. Detailed autopsies of the women who died on the ward were performed in the mornings at the clinic. Despite his attempts to find a major difference between the clinics, Semmelweis concluded the same procedures and practices were used at both clinics.

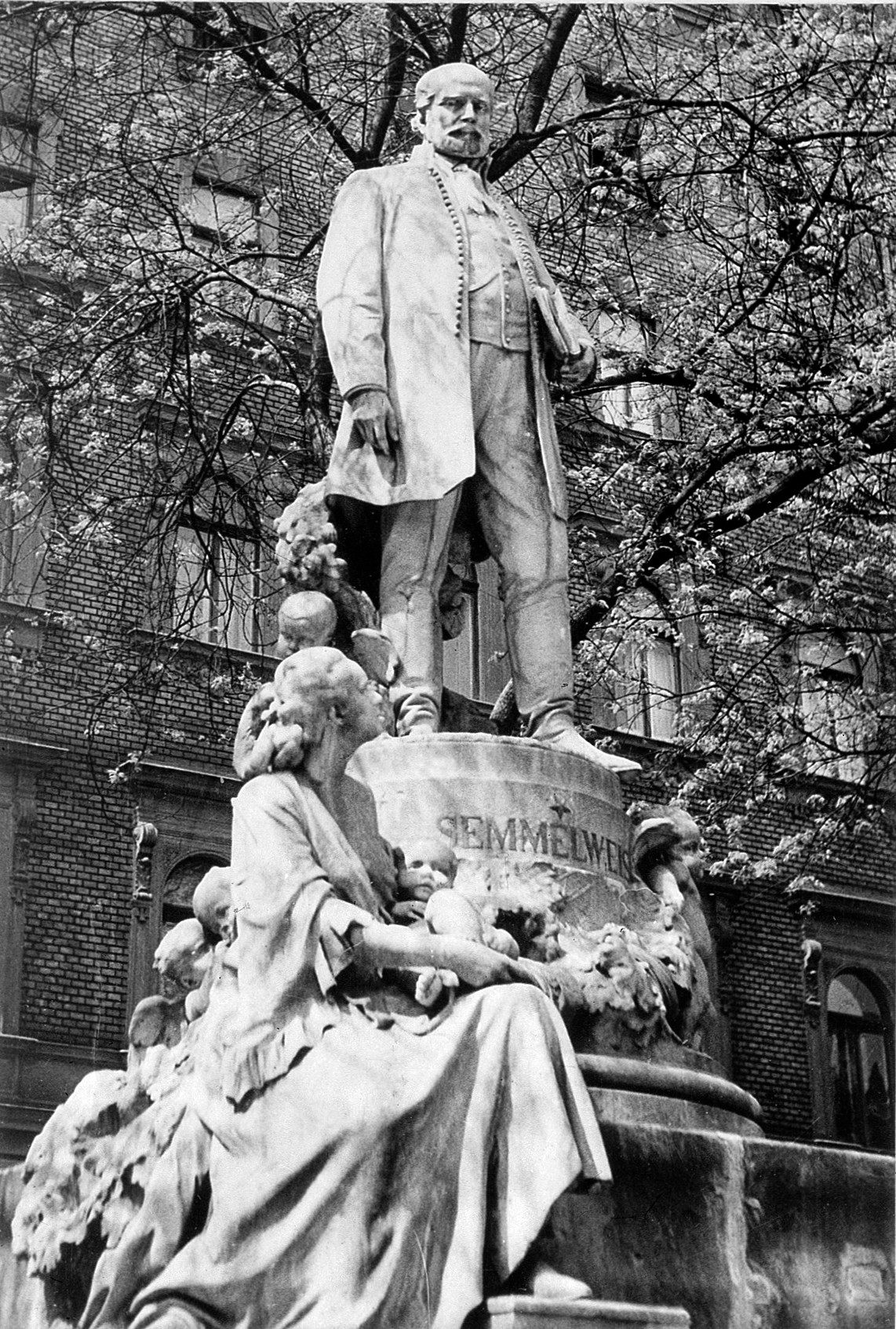
Statue honoring Semmelweis as the "Savior of Mothers"

The first clue came in 1847 in the form of tragedy for Semmelweis. A good friend of his at the clinic, Jakob Kolletschka, died after performing an autopsy with a cut on his hand. The cut was sustained from a medical student accidentally slitting his hand with a scalpel during the procedure. This friend had similar symptoms and post-mortem pathology to the mothers who died of childbed fever. Medical students performed autopsies prior to delivering babies, but the midwives only participated in labor and delivery care. Semmelweis then made the connection that left over pieces of a dead body could be transmitted via physician's hands into a live body and cause illness. The bacteria which caused childbed fever in Semmelweis's medical clinic was Streptococcus pyogenes. Though he did not have knowledge of specific microorganisms like bacteria, he understood disease could be transferred from one body into another. He advocated for the changing of bedsheets for this reason.

Semmelweis then required a strict handwashing regimen at the clinic ran by physicians and medical students using chlorinated water and brushes to remove any cadaver particles from under their fingernails. This decreased the death rate from 11.4% at the clinic to 2.7%. No mothers died in March or August in 1848 after the introduction of the handwashing protocol. In 1860 Semmelweis published a book titled Etiology, the Concept, and the Prevention of Puerperal Fever, but it was met with backlash from physicians. The medical community deemed it to be offensive since doctors considered themselves to be high status and were therefore not dirty or carriers of disease (as miasma was understood to be connected to immorality).

Semmelweis did not live to see his findings contribute to the germ theory of disease. He began to become obsessed with speaking only about puerperal fever and developed Alzheimer's-type symptoms which led to him being placed in a mental institution in 1865. That same year, he died from sepsis after sustaining wounds at the asylum. The wounds were believed to be from an attempted escape or caused by beatings or abuse he endured while detained. After the germ theory was widely accepted, Semmelweis became a celebrated figure with several hospitals and institutions named after him. Roughly 14 years after his death, scientists began to support his ideas. He became known as "The father of hand hygiene" and "The savior of mothers."

=== John Snow ===
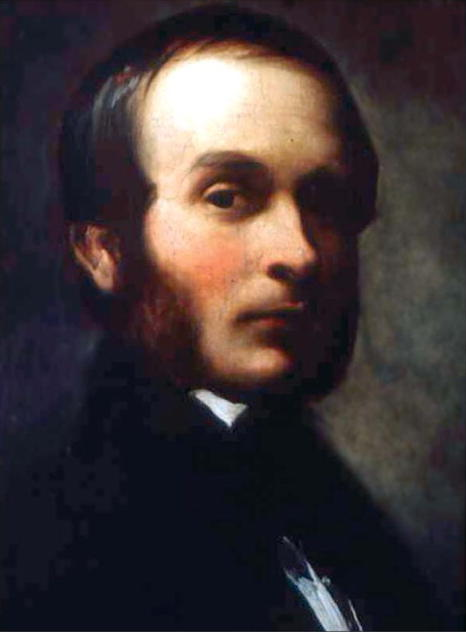
Portrait of John Snow, 1847

England had multiple cholera epidemics during the 19th century. The earliest outbreak in Britain occurred in 1831. In that year, 21,800 people died from cholera within the country. These outbreaks were first blamed on the poor because they were said to smell bad and be immoral. This population was believed to cause "bad air." Foul urban air at the time was the prevailing theory of how disease was transmitted (miasma theory).

John Snow was an anesthesiologist who became well respected after anesthetizing Queen Victoria using chloroform during the birth of one of her children in 1847. In 1854 when a deadly cholera outbreak occurred close to his home in London, his priorities changed. Snow became concerned and was determined to discover the origin of the cholera outbreak. Even though the germ theory had not been established yet, he felt the outbreaks were not caused by "bad air" infecting blood, but by something entering a person's gut. Snow determined that inhaling "bad air" would not result in intestinal disease.

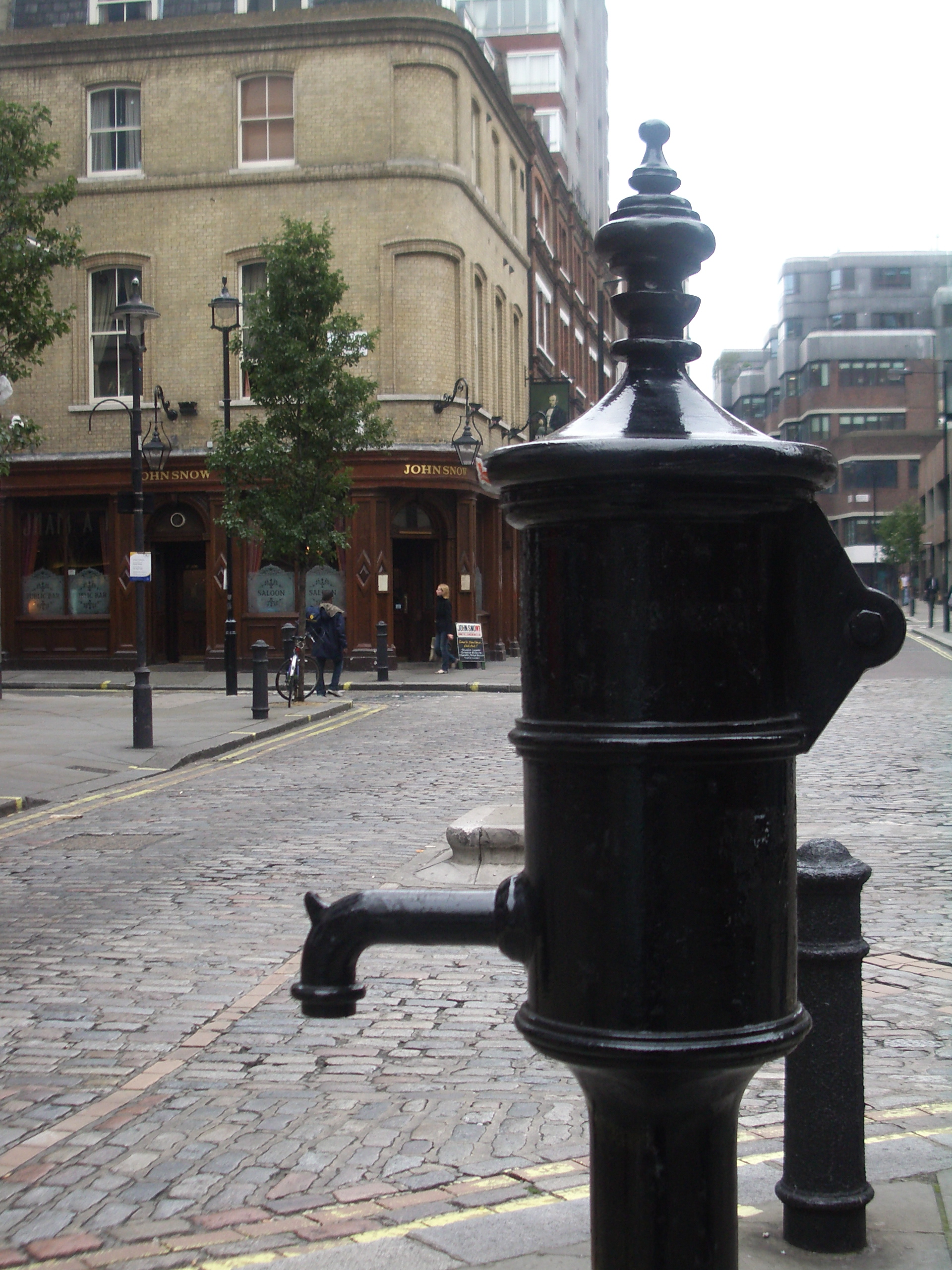
Replica of the Broad Street pump across from the John Snow Pub

The 1854 outbreak was centralized in a suburb of London called Soho. The number of deaths were concerning enough that some families fled their homes to find a new location to live in London. Snow theorized in the late 1840s that cholera was transmitted through water in an essay titled On the Mode of Communication of Cholera. He specifically believed that it was the contamination of water which spread cholera. At the time, London's sewage system was rudimentary with unmaintained cesspools and the dumping of waste into the River Thames. Snow decided to start his investigation by plotting each public water pump located within the Soho district on a map. He then asked for recent death records and walked the area to find the homes and families of the victims. The victim's families were asked questions about their loved one's routines and he marked each death on the map he had created. The map revealed that Broad Street and the area near it had the most mortalities. On this street was the Broad Street water pump. The houses nearest to that pump were the most affected by the disease. However, Snow noted there were two places nearby that were not affected by the pump so he explored why this was the case. One of these places was a workhouse in walking distance to the pump. This workhouse saw 5 deaths from cholera yet had over 500 workers. He discovered this workhouse had its own private water well which employees drank from instead of the Broad Street pump. Another nearby brewery had no deaths, but the men were given free beer to drink throughout their work day. There were outlier deaths that Snow decided to investigate. These were deaths that occurred outside of the typical pattern on his map. Snow discovered a woman and her niece, though they lived miles away from the pump, died of cholera. After interviewing a surviving family member, he found out that she once lived in the area and she particularly liked the Broad Street water. Because of this, she sent a servant to this particular pump to get water for her. The niece had been over to her house and consumed water from the pump. Another outlier case involved two young school children who died, but lived on a different street which had its own source of water. However, these two girls used Broad Street to travel to their school and back. They were known to drink from the well during their walk.

John Snow's 1854 map. Cholera cases are in black.

Snow had already postulated nearly a decade earlier that water was to blame for cholera epidemics, and this investigation strengthened his claim. He made connections between events and used visual empirical evidence to support his claims. He took a sample of water from the Broad Street pump and studied it under a microscope. Unlike other water sources, this pump's water contained an unknown microbe that resembled white wool. Later this bacteria was given the name Vibrio cholerae. It is now recognized as the bacteria which infects a person with cholera. Though the city was not fully convinced of John Snow's theory on cholera, they removed the handle on the pump when Snow asked. This decreased the death rate from cholera rather quickly even though the mortality rates were already in decline.

Later it was discovered that cracks in a nearby cesspool leaked fecal matter into the water at Broad Street. Modern medical science has labeled this transmission of disease as the fecal oral route. But at that time, this route of disease was unknown to both physicians and the public. A baby named Frances Lewis was believed to be the first case which caused the outbreak. Her birth and death certificate match the time of the outbreak. A doctor listed the cause of death as a diarrheal "attack." Her mother cleaned her diapers in buckets then threw the water into the cesspool which leaked into the water supply.

After his diligent investigation into the 1854 cholera outbreak, Snow became a member of the London Epidemiological Society. He published a second edition of his prior book On the Mode of Communication of Cholera in 1855. He did not live to see the establishment of the germ theory of disease in the late 1800s. He died of a stroke at the age of 45.

=== Florence Nightingale ===
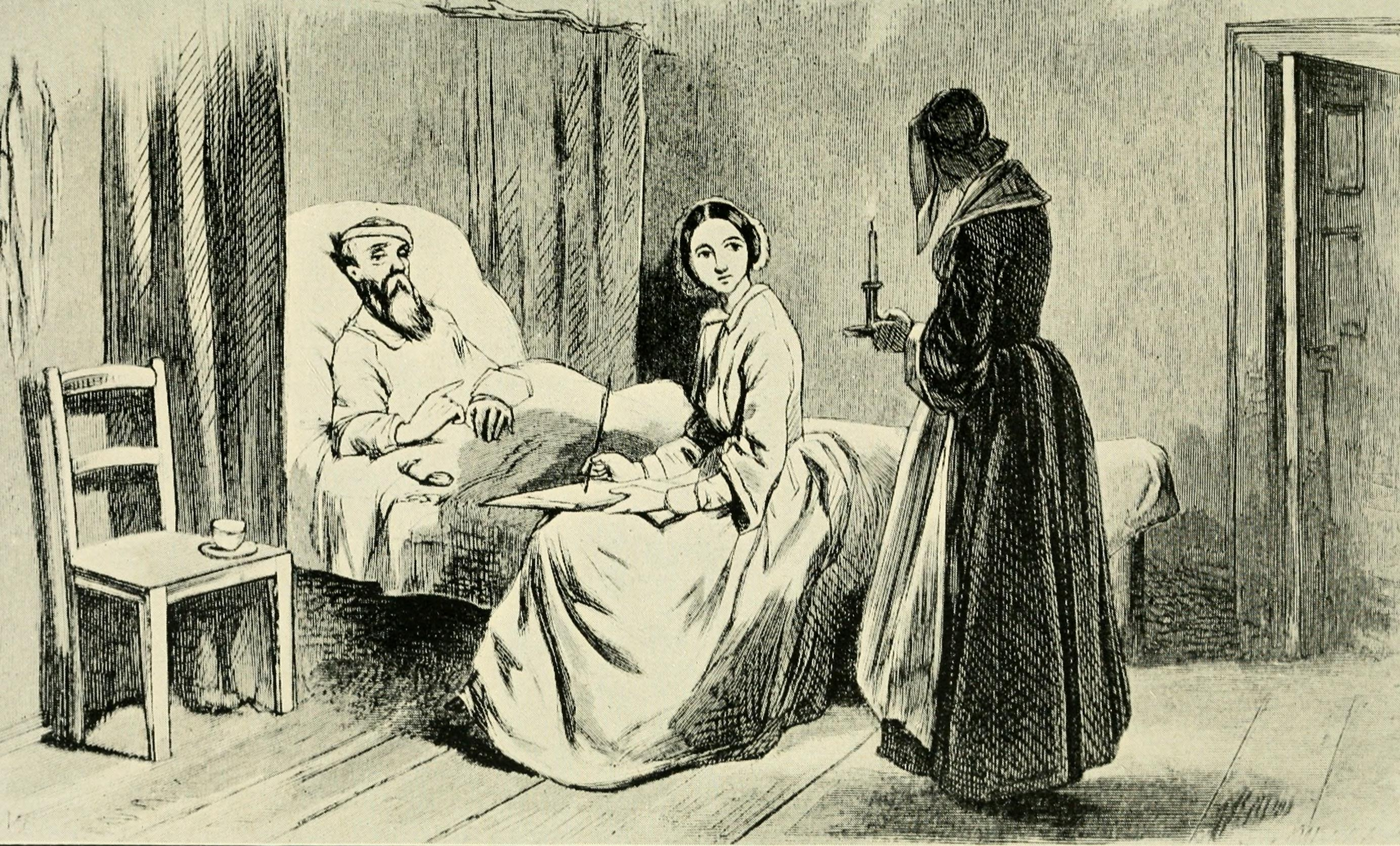
Artistic rendering of Florence Nightingale checking on a patient. She was known as "The lady with the lamp."

Florence Nightingale, like the majority of people living in the Victorian time period, believed in the miasma theory of disease. Though she was a mathematician and statistician, she was asked by the British secretary of war to join a nursing service during The Crimean War. When Nightingale arrived in Scutari, Turkey, the conditions of the British army hospital were gruesome and putrid. She noticed the leading cause of mortality for soldiers was not battle, but rather infection and illness. Though she still believed at that time "foul air" caused disease (miasma theory), she began a cleaning protocol to improve the air quality. There were men and areas of the hospital covered in feces. The plumbing and sewer system were both broken and their water supply at the hospital was mixed with sewer water. There was an infestation of both vermin and insects. Nightingale reported these concerns to the British Sanitary Commission so they could help with these large items on her agenda to fix. She also implemented a laundry service for both bedsheets and clothing, she proposed handwashing procedures for nurses, patient bathing practices were introduced, clean bandages were obtained, and healthy meals were provided.

When Nightingale first came to the hospital, the doctors and staff were not interested in hearing her ideas. They were also disinterested in the use of female nurses. However, when the hospital became understaffed and overpopulated, Nightingale and the 38 other women who came to serve, were then allowed to make these changes. Prior to Nightingale and her team, the mortality rate at the hospital was roughly 40%. However, with these new practices in place the number fell to 2% This became public and was printed in the British news. Nightingale, who wandered the hospital at night checking on patients, became known as "The lady with the lamp" and acquired new found prominence within her country.

Nightingale wrote about her experience at the hospital when she returned to England. Notes on Matters Affecting the Health, Efficiency, and Hospital Administration of the British Army was written in 1858 and sent to Queen Victoria. It was a work that outlined the horrific issues witnessed at the British army hospital in Scutari. Nightingale lobbied for hospital reform and worked with epidemiologist William Farr to gather more data about the leading cause of mortality in the British army. It was then she created a visual representation of that data so people could interpret it easily. Her next book was titled Notes on Hospitals and was written in 1859, but like a textbook, it had multiple editions. This book served as a hospital manual, but not just patient care. The work included the optimal way to physically build a hospital, and contained statistics that William Farr helped provide which supported her claims. As a statistician, she was able to compile and describe empirical evidence in her written works which justified the hospital reform changes she deemed necessary. Proposed changes like quarantined wards for certain illnesses and strict hygienic procedures decreased the high rate of infection within the hospitals she reformed. Even with evidence, her proposed reforms were not widely accepted until years after her initial lobbying began.

Statistical diagram created by Florence Nightingale detailing cause of death in the British army in The Crimean War.

== Discovery of living germs ==
Though some nurses and doctors were beginning to become skeptical of the miasma theory in the 19th century, there were no other prevailing explanations for epidemics and infections. Ignaz Semmelweis and John Snow understood that people could get sick from objects, water, or hands that were contaminated by bodily fluids or substances. However, the answer as to why this was the case remained unknown.

=== Louis Pasteur ===
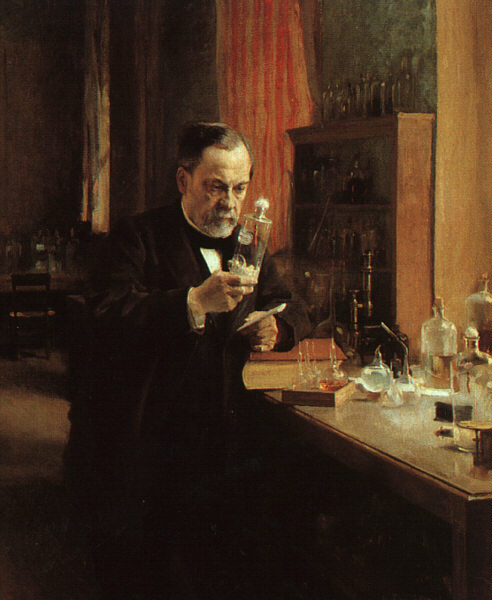
Portrait of Louis Pasteur in his lab

Louis Pasteur was a French chemist who discovered chirality while studying crystals. This discovery became the basis for a new form of chemistry called stereochemistry. While Pasteur was studying paratartrate crystals in 1857, he discovered that his calcium paratartaric acid solutions were growing fungi. The left and right sides of the crystal had split apart from each other. The left side turned into tartaric acid and it fermented. Under his microscope, this tartaric acid was now optically active in polarized light. Only alive substances can be rotated through the polarized light plane. Many of his contemporaries believed fermentation to be a lifeless decomposing process. Pasteur then realized a small, but alive, substance may have caused the fermentation. This led him to examine the process of fermentation more closely. In 1860, his book Researches on the Molecular Asymmetry of Natural Organic Products was published. In this work, he stated that asymmetric molecules distinguished organic substances from non-organic ones. Pasteur was then asked by Napoleon III to study French wineries because a large portion of French wine was contaminated. Pasteur believed that heating the wine could destroy the microorganisms which had contaminated it. This process became known as pasteurization.

Pasteur's experiment to disprove spontaneous generation

Pasteur then became curious as to where these contaminants came from and so he began to study spontaneous generation. At the time, it was believed organisms could self-generate within a rotting piece of food or flesh. As stated previously in Lister's segment, doctors also believed wounds spontaneously generated miasmas within the air in hospital wards. In 1859, Pasteur ran an experiment where he boiled broth in flasks that had long straw-like curved necks. This thin neck allowed a small amount of air into the flask without exposing its contents to particulates in the air or around the flask. One of the flasks was left as it was. There was a flask which did not have the thin neck and this allowed the broth to become exposed to any particles around it. Bacteria quickly grew within this flask. Another flask was left tilted so the broth was nearly pouring out of the straw-like curved top, the liquid became cloudy and bacteria also grew within it. The broth protected from particles took a significantly longer amount of time before any signs of bacterial growth occurred within it. He was then able to disprove spontaneous generation. Only the broth exposed to the particles and microbes around it, grew bacteria at a quick rate. In 1861, Pasteur named his theory of contamination "Germ Theory." He stated the opposite of the miasma theory: microbe carried by the air reacted with live substances causing contamination. These microbes did not generate themselves within the air. By 1862, Pasteur stated microbes were present everywhere. This was considered a major opposition to the predominant miasma theory.

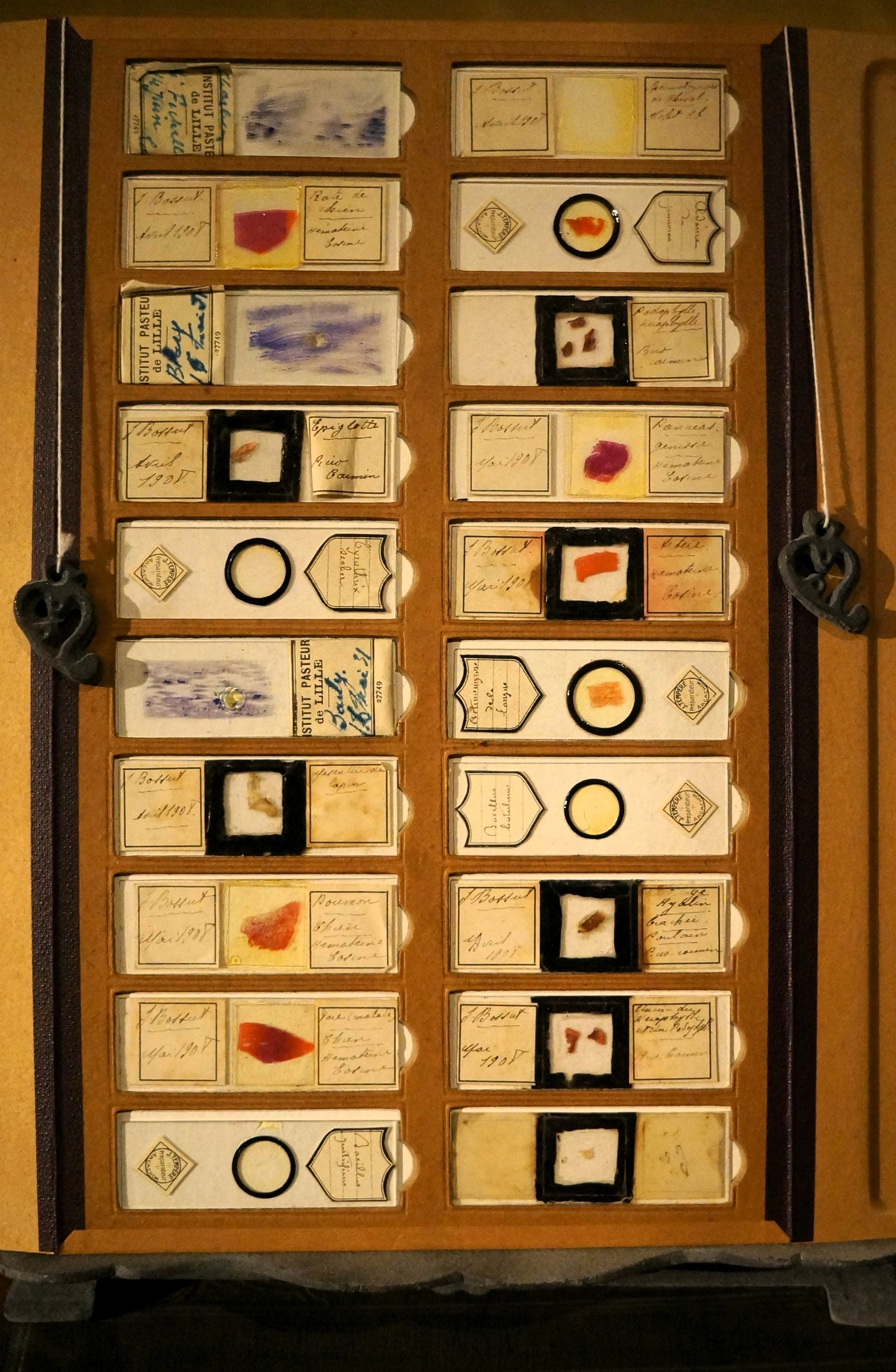
Microscope slides and coverslips for Pasteur's researches on silkworm diseases (Musée de l'Institut Louis Pasteur, Lille)

Like wine, the silk industry was also an important part of France's economy. However, large numbers of silkworms began dying from diseases and the French government asked Pasteur to investigate the problem. Pasteur connected the disease in silk worms known as pébrine to the parasite Nosema bombycis. The other disease called flacherie caused silkworms to become dark brown. Pébrine was thought to be a form of flacherie since it caused brown dots on the silkworms. But, Pasteur discovered Pébrine and flacherie were separate diseases. Pasteur claimed bacteria within the silkworms' intestinal track caused flacherie. He then used a microscope to sort which eggs were infected and which were not. This was an effective way of discarding the diseased eggs so these worms would not enter the population. Pasteur was able to distinguish the diseases through the specific microorganisms present in the silkworms. This began the path to germ specificity within the theory. Pasteur's contemporary Robert Koch devoted much of his scientific study to discovering certain pathogens and connecting them to specific diseases. These scientists were often in competition with one another and so the Koch-Pasteur rivalry is a well-known part of germ theory's history.

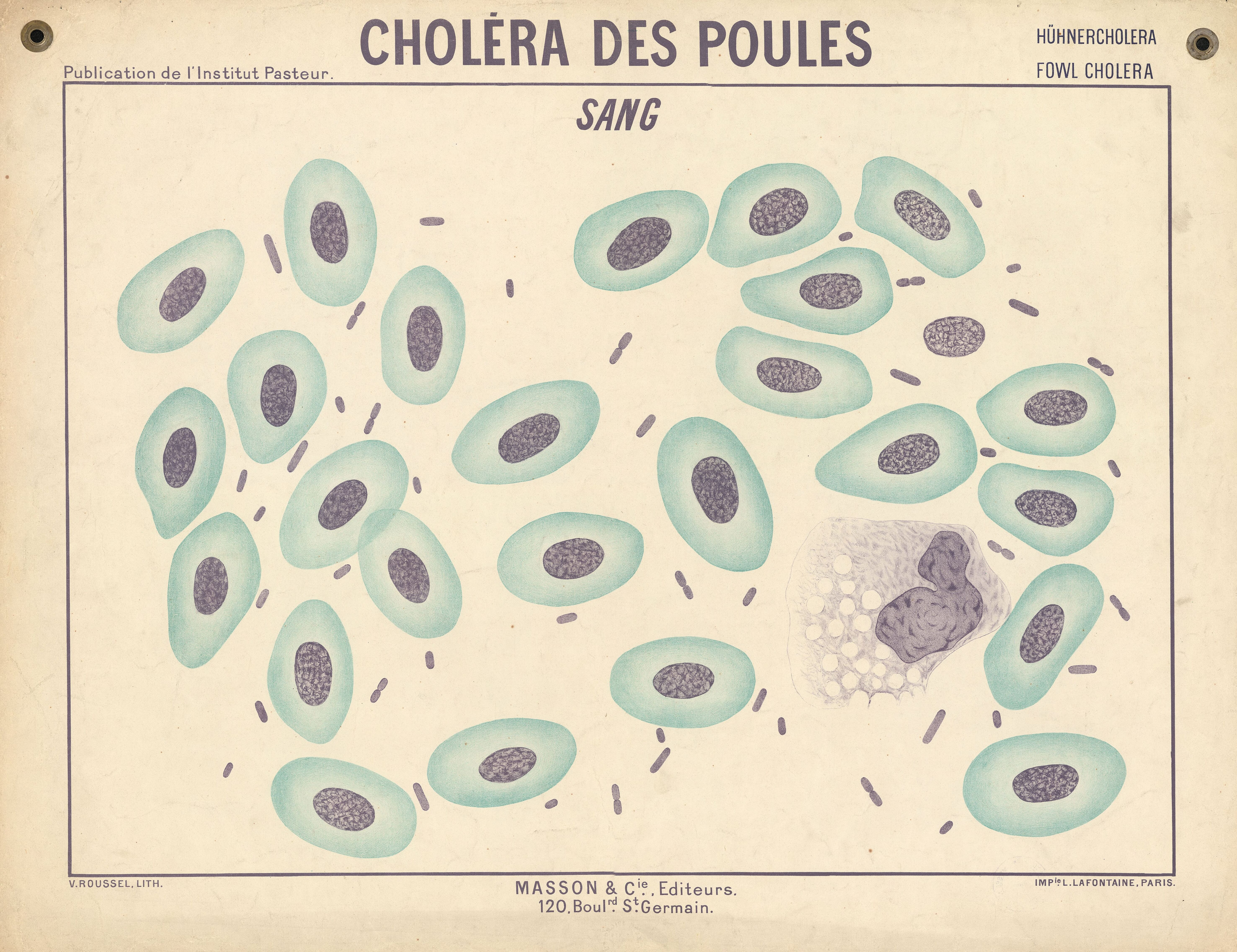
Fowl Cholera, didactic poster by Pasteur Institute (1920)

In 1867, Pasteur became a chemistry professor at the Sorbonne, though he continued to study silkworms until 1870, he became curious as to what could cure disease. Pasteur wanted to discover if his work had greater applications than improving alcohol production and diagnosing silkworms. In the 1870s, large numbers of chickens were dying from cholera. When he cultured the bacteria from the chickens, he left these cultures out in the air for long periods of time. By happenchance the bacteria reproduced, yet became weaker and considerably less virulent. He used Edward Jenner's early vaccination concept, but improved upon it by injecting the chickens with this less virulent strain of the disease. These vaccinated chickens survived, however, some still had the bacteria in their feces. Pasteur believed this might explain asymptomatic carriers of disease during epidemics.

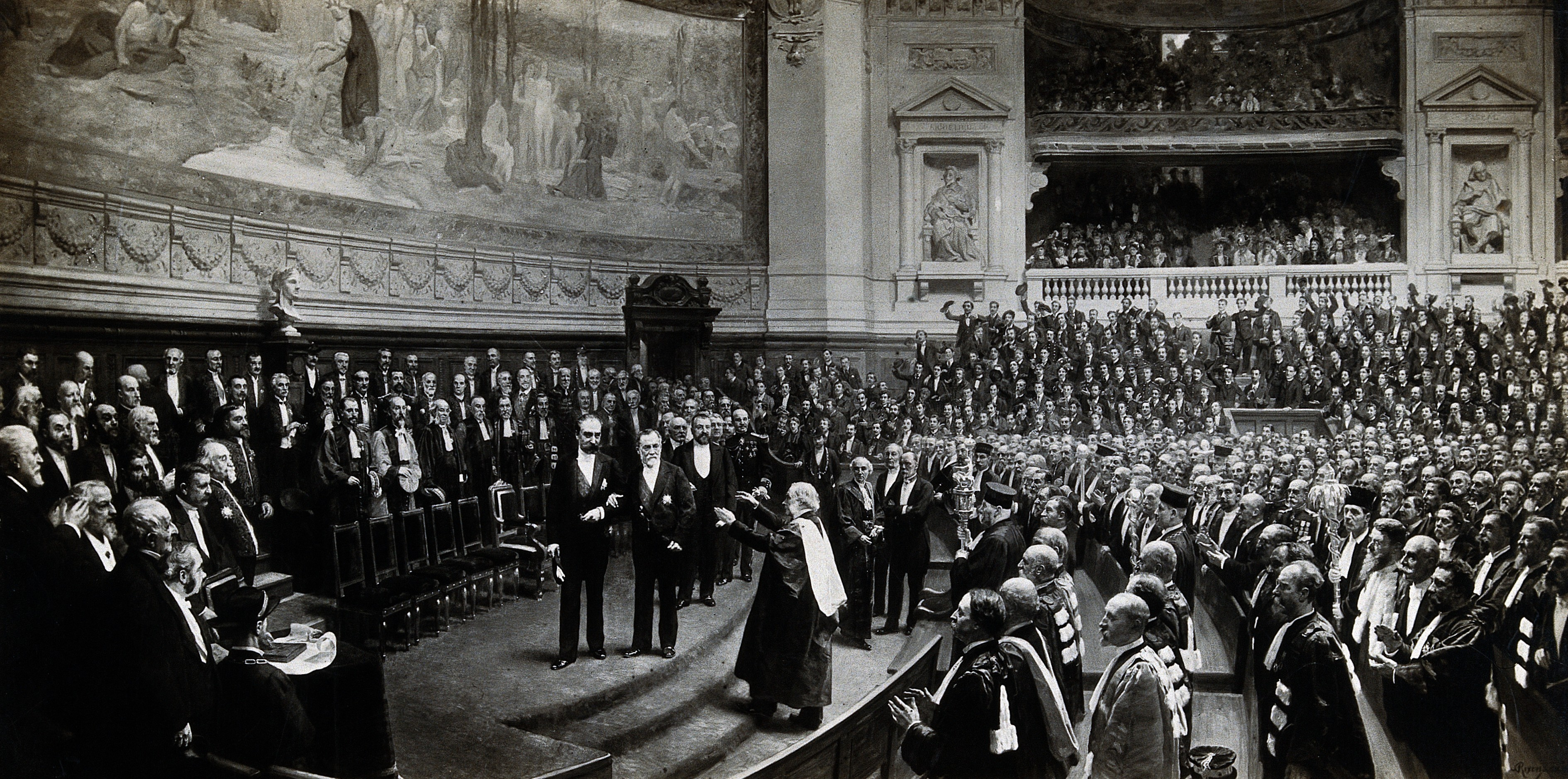
Joseph Lister acclaiming Louis Pasteur

In 1878, Pasteur made a presentation to the French Academy of Sciences. The title of the presentation was: The Germ Theory and its Applications to Medicine and Science. Within this presentation he stated that the health of mankind depended upon unseen organisms, "If it is a terrifying thought that life is at the mercy of the multiplication of these minute bodies, it is a consoling hope that Science will not always remain powerless before such enemies." Pasteur also mentioned that Joseph Lister had been successful in using his science in medical practice, "This theory would found a new surgery—already begun by a celebrated English surgeon Dr. Lister who was among the first to understand its fertility." In 1879 at the next French Academy of Sciences conference, he stopped a scientist's presentation on childbed fever. The presenter said that "puerperal miasmas" were to blame for the death of these mothers. Pasteur openly blamed the clinicians' hands and the conditions of the ward as Ignaz Semmelweis discovered. When the scientist said there was no proof of these microbes, Pasteur walked up and drew a picture of the streptococcus bacteria responsible for puerperal fever on the blackboard. That same year Pasteur had examined it when blood cultures were taken from the wombs of women who died of child bed fever.

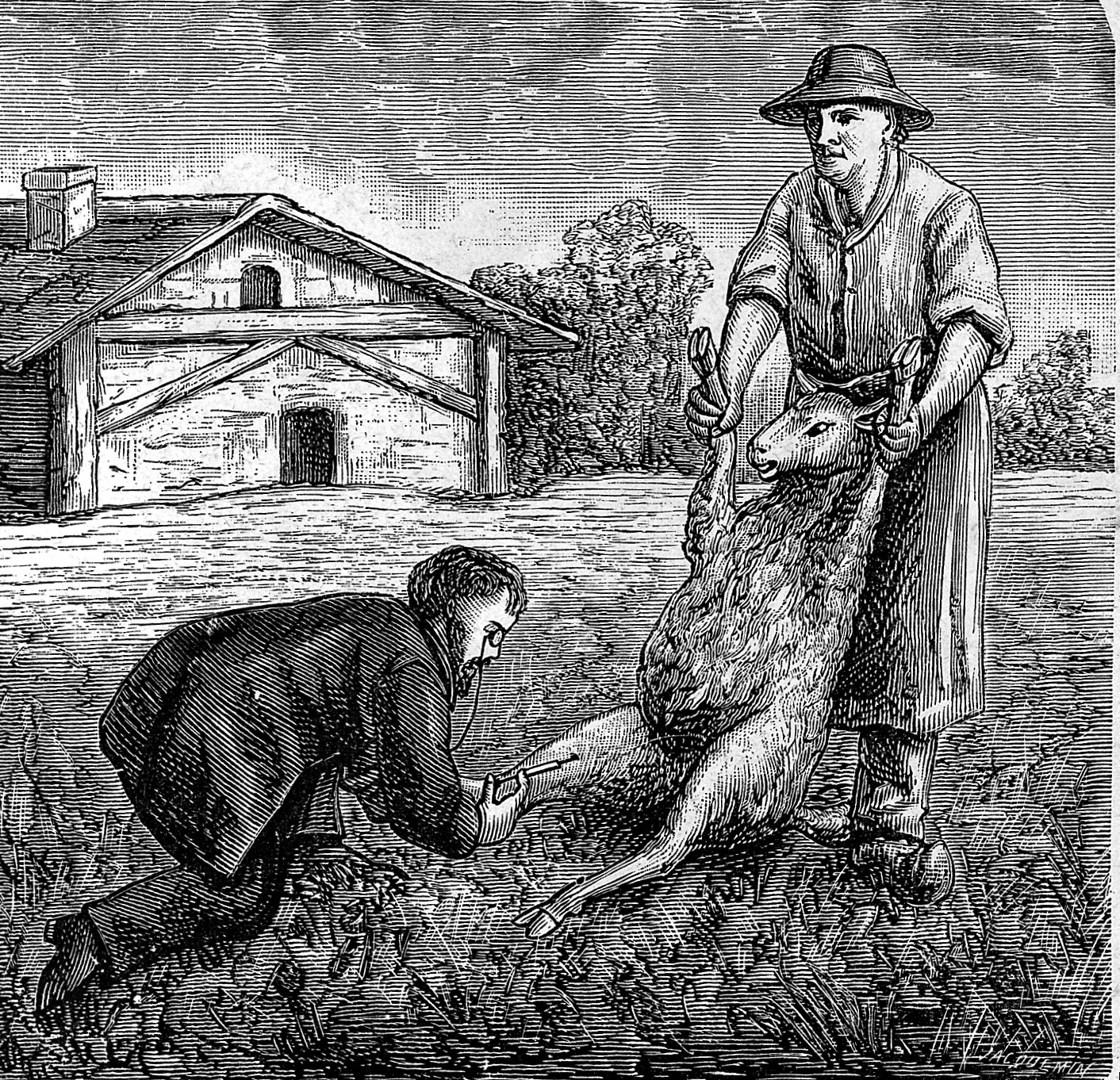
Pasteur inoculating sheep against anthrax (engraving from Charles Chamberland's Le charbon et la vaccination charbonneuse, 1883)

In 1881, Pasteur would develop the vaccine for anthrax after discovering how to lower the bacteria's virality. In his experiment he had 2 groups of livestock: a control group who received no injection and a group he inoculated with anthrax bacteria of low virulence. Twelve days later he injected the fully virulent form of anthrax into both groups. Within 3 days most of the control group had died or were very ill, but the inoculated group survived and had no symptoms of the infection. Two-hundred people showed up to observe the success of Pasteur's vaccination. This gave him fame in many domains because among the crowd were politicians, veterinarians, agriculturists, and journalists. His popularity would lead to the Pasteur Institute system. Brazil's emperor Dom Pedro II was an intellectual who followed Pasteur's work. The first institute to open was not the Paris institute, but instead one located in Rio de Janeiro. The facility was dedicated to the study of rabies.

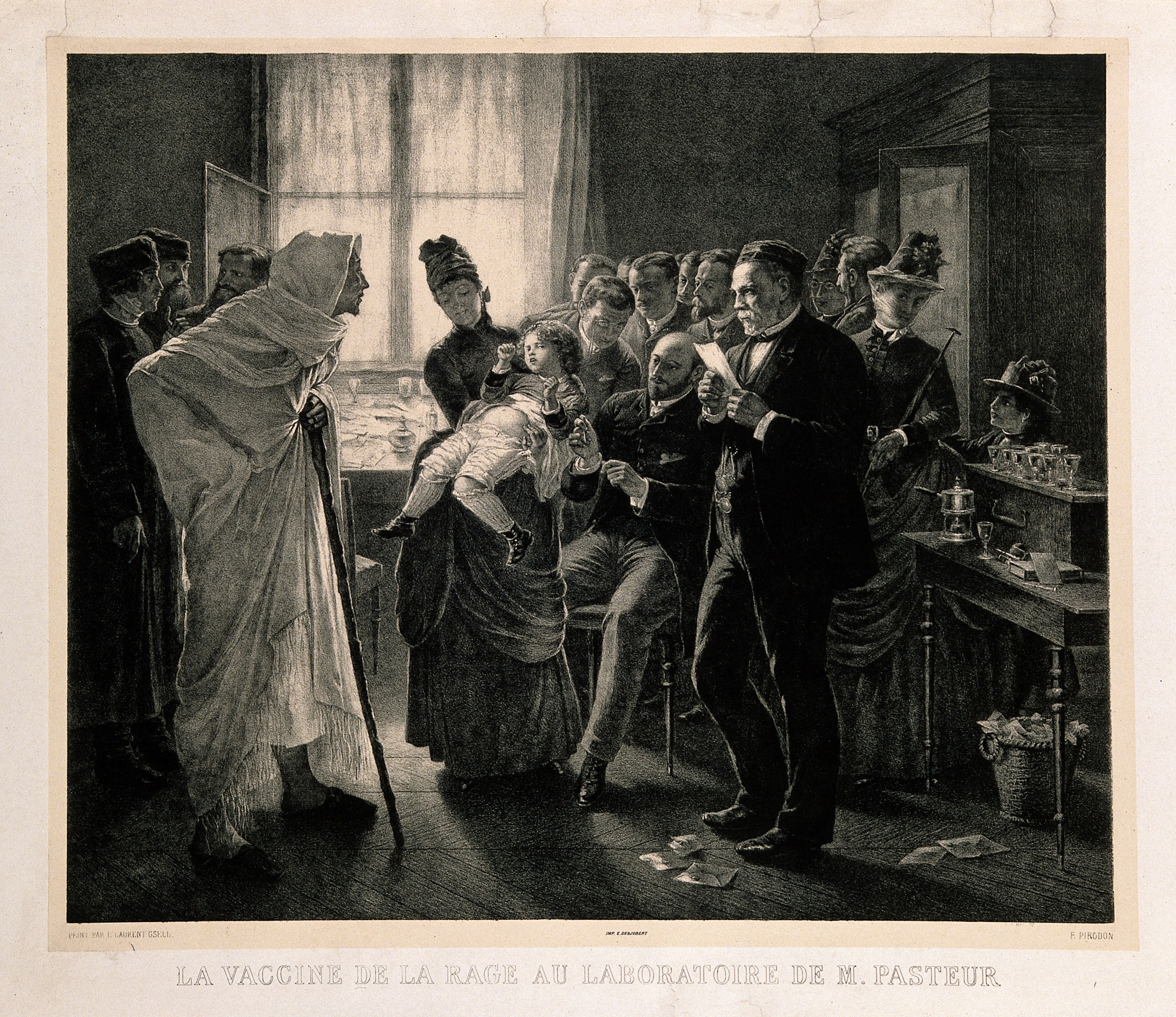
Rabies vaccination in Pasteur's clinic in Paris (lithograph of Lucien Laurent-Gsell's La Vaccine de la rage, 1887)

Pasteur's final contribution was a vaccination for rabies. Unlike bacteria, viruses were less understood at the time and Pasteur could not observe them in his microscope. However, he understood the virus was attacking the nervous system. After a few failed attempts at attenuating the virus, he extracted spinal fluid from rabbits with rabies and left the flasks open to air out and dry. This method finally decreased the virulence of the rabies virus. Dom Pedro III wanted Pasteur to test this successful vaccine on human subjects; specifically convicts sentenced to death. Pasteur wrote a letter back that his "hand trembled" at the thought of injecting a person. Though Pasteur was fearful, he was faced with a choice when a child was brought to Hôpital des Enfants-malades with multiple bites from a rabid dog. The child's doctor Joseph Grancher asked Pasteur to treat the boy even though Pasteur was unsure of the vaccine's effect on a human. Dr. Grancher reminded Pasteur that he would die regardless. Since Pasteur was not a physician, Dr. Grancher injected the boy with his first injection on July 6 of 1885. This child was then given 12 more injections over the span of 10 days. He never contracted rabies and was the first human being to get inoculated.

Louis Pasteur was known as a pioneer of microbiology and "The father of immunology". People from all over the world wanted to get vaccinated for rabies, so in 1880 l'Institut Pasteur was constructed in Paris. Pasteur's health declined and on his last birthday he was widely celebrated by the scientific community. He died in 1895 and is buried within a mausoleum inside of the Pasteur Institute. Scientists continued his research at these institutes and they discovered other pathogens and important prophylactic measures.

=== Joseph Lister ===
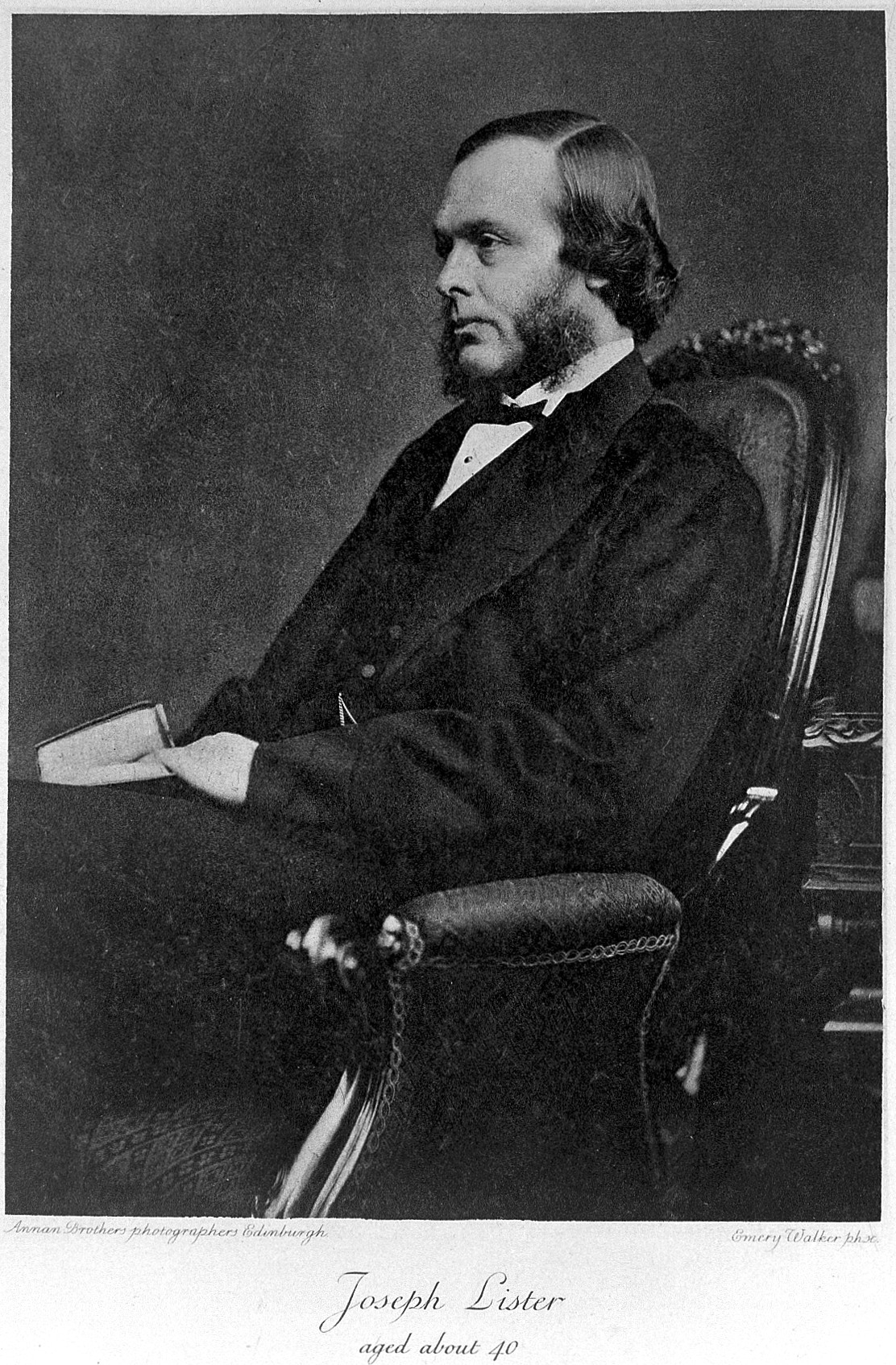
Portrait of Joseph Lister

Surgical techniques advanced in the 19th century, but the chances of a patient dying from post-operative infection was 50%. Prior to the discovery of the germ theory of disease, surgeons did not clean their surgical instruments or the operating table between patients. Semmelweis's work on hand hygiene was either ignored or unknown to surgeons. Sawdust covered the floor of an operative theater to soak up bodily fluids. Laudable pus draining from a surgical incision was considered a normal post-operative phenomena. Physicians had special tools to drain this green liquid from the incision site. These tools, which touched infection, were not sanitized between patients. The surgeons believed as long as there wasn't "bad air" in the operating room they had properly cared for the patient.

Joseph Lister was a British surgeon. In 1860 he was chosen to be the Regius Professor over the surgical department at Glasgow University. Lister worked as a wound dresser under surgeon Sir John Eric Erichsen. told Lister the wound created miasmas in the air and wound miasmas could spread to other patients in the surgical ward. This was his explanation for gangrene within a surgical ward. Lister observed that if a wound was kept clean, the patient was less likely to develop infections and the wound could heal. In 1865 Lister read Pasteur's work on the fermentation and distilling process at a winery in France. The wine was contaminated and Pasteur used heat to destroy the responsible bacteria. Pasteur also noted if there was an absence of air, the fermentation of wine was impossible. Microbes such as yeast reacted to the air, but they were not spontaneously generated in the air as the miasma theory taught. Lister found inspiration in Pasteur's fermentation work. He wondered if there were microbes within a wound that needed to be destroyed or covered so they wouldn't react to the air. However unlike Pasteur, Lister could not use heat to destroy the microbes in a wound. Instead, he decided to use a chemical called carbolic acid because he heard about the use of creosote to sanitize sewage.

The standard treatment for compression fractures at the time was amputation of the limb. Lister noted that 50% of patients who received an amputation at the hospital died of infection. In August 1865, a boy was brought to the hospital with a compression fracture on his left tibia. Instead of amputating the leg, he advised his team to thoroughly clean the wound with carbolic acid, set the leg with wooden boards, and place a cloth soaked in carbolic acid on top of the injury site. Lister hoped this would allow the child to keep his leg and also prevent fatal sepsis of the wound. After the boy was in the hospital for a few days, there were no signs of infection at the fracture site. The bones then began to fuse and the child made a full recovery. After this successful treatment, Lister continued to treat compression fractures with these same protocols. He noticed the key difference between compression fractures and regular fractures: the compression fractures caused an exposed wound. These new treatment protocols reduced the death rate in the "accident ward" to 15% by 1869. Lister decided to not only treat wounds, but also limit the chances of post-operative infection through new surgical practices. He cleaned his patients' bodies with carbolic acid along with his tools and his hands before an operation. However, the Glasgow Infirmary did not believe in his new methods and his wards were not cleaned and well-kept.

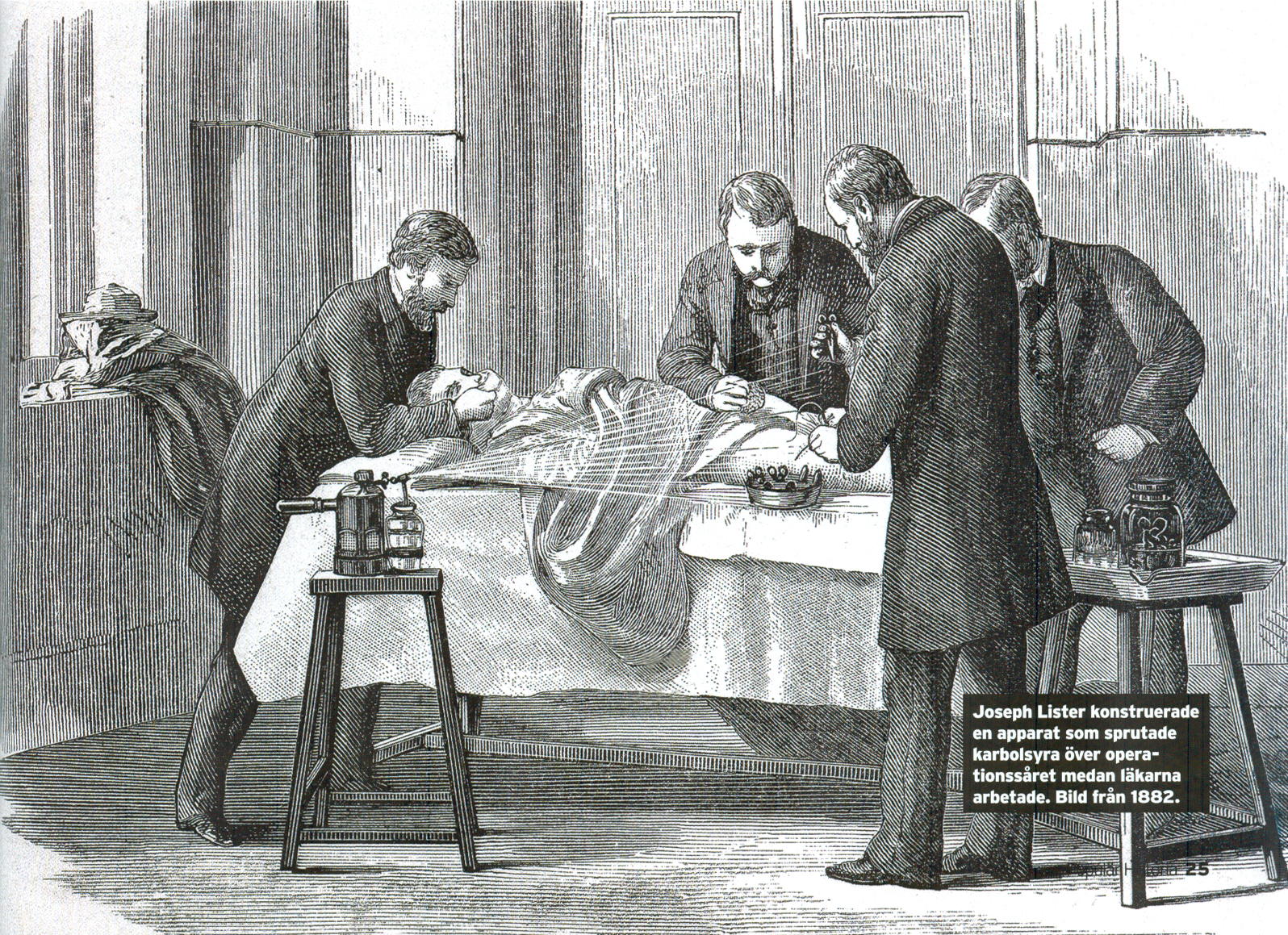
Lister spraying carbolic acid during an operation

In 1869 a professorship position opened at the University of Edinburgh. The medical students there urged administration to appoint Lister to this position. Lister gained a large following of medical students while appointed at Edinburgh.Unlike his time at Glasgow, this facility had a significantly larger population of medical students who respected and followed his work. In spite of his great success in preventing infection, the medical community at large did not accept these new methods. In 1871, Lister would gain notoriety by performing a procedure on Queen Victoria. When her abscess drained pus after his operation, he was quick to develop specialized tubing soaked in carbolic acid to drain the abscess. The queen recovered and praised Lister's efforts. His work became known as "Listerism." Germany was the first country to enact his antiseptic principles within their hospitals. Many hospitals in the United States placed a ban on his antiseptic techniques. After his great success in England, he spoke at an international conference in Philadelphia and this convinced several hospitals to revoke this ban. Germ theory denialism was a major hindrance to medical progress in the 19th century.

Since Lister had the queen's blessing, his antiseptic policies became accepted medical practice. Semmelweis did not gain this type of support with his chlorinated lime handwashing protocol. He did not have the public eye on his side nor the medical community. Lister, however, was able to persuade medical students and clinicians. Lister did see his work contribute to medical science and germ theory; he was celebrated in life instead of after his death. He was granted the title Baron Lister of Lyme Regis and given a place in the Order of Merit. When the news of the queen's survival due to antiseptics became widespread, England became intrigued by bodily cleanliness. Companies profited on this by selling carbolic acid soaps, fumigators, and an oral antiseptic named after Lister (Listerine). Most notably, his acclaim marked the shift away from the miasma theory in medicine. Pasteur's influence on Lister demonstrates the union of scientific research and informed medical practice. Lister's claim that bacteria causes wound infection and that wounds must be kept clean, are still important principles of modern medical care.

=== Robert Koch ===
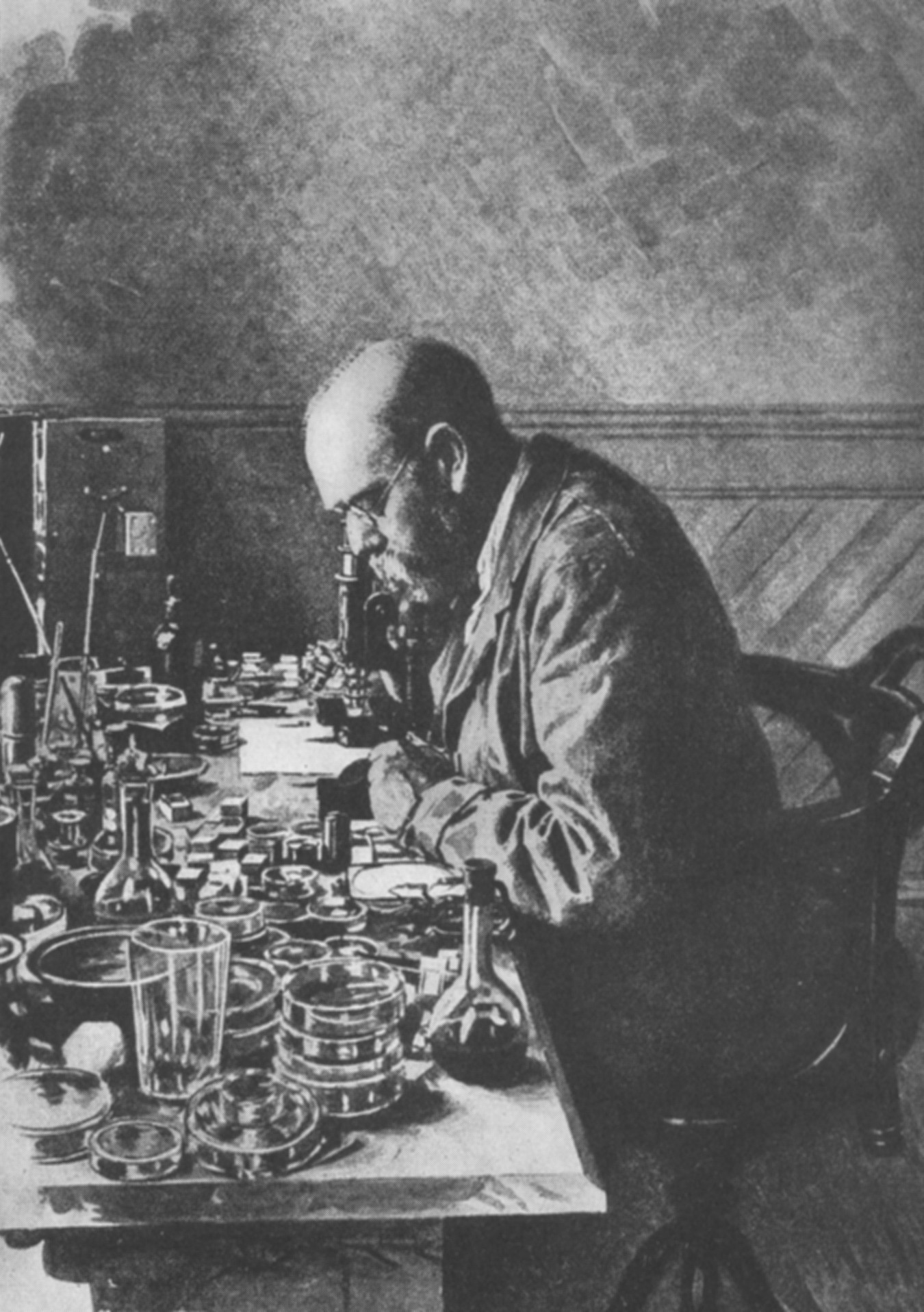
Robert Koch in his laboratory

Pasteur proved that microscopic organisms cause disease and other biological processes like fermentation. Robert Koch, a German physician and contemporary of Louis Pasteur, was also interested in such research. However, Koch was instrumental in the discovery and observation of illness-causing bacteria. He contributed greatly to science related to the specificity of bacteria . He discovered and confirmed that a specific bacteria causes a specific illness.

In the 1870s, anthrax was a major cause of concern to both farmers and people living in the area of an outbreak. Within a four-year time span, 56,000 animals and nearly 530 people had died of this devastating disease. Koch worked in a home laboratory to unravel the mystery of what caused anthrax. The microscope in this lab was a gift from his wife. Koch ran an experiment by injecting mice with anthrax infected blood. He also injected mice with blood from healthy livestock. The mice who received the anthrax infected blood died the next day. After examining the mice that had died, he discovered they had rod shaped organisms within their blood and tissues. He continued to inject the mice by recirculating the diseased blood of the dead mice into the ones that were alive. As he continued to do this, the mice still died, and the anthrax rods changed shape upon his evaluation. The elongated rods appeared to be in the process of reproducing. He then took the eye of an ox and placed the anthrax bacteria within it. He predicted the bacteria was alive and this was proven to be true when the bacteria multiplied. He kept track of its reproduction and noted the bacteria would create spores by reproducing within itself since it had no living host. When he kept these spores over the years, they could still infect an organism even if they had dried out. He predicted these spores were resilient and remained in fields and pastures even if those fields hadn't been used for animal husbandry in a long time. Koch then suggested farmers cremate an animal who died of anthrax to prevent spore generation from occurring in the ground. This experiment was the first to prove that a specific bacteria caused a specific illness with specific symptoms. In 1876, he published a paper titled "The etiology of anthrax disease based on the evolutionary history of Bacillus anthracis" written in German. It included a drawing of the bacteria, but in 1877 he would become the first scientist to produce a photograph of this bacteria by staining it with dye. It was the first time anyone had seen an actual photograph of a microbe. Even though it would be discovered later that bacillus anthracis is not the only cause of anthrax, this was a monumental experiment that laid the foundation for the field of bacteriology.

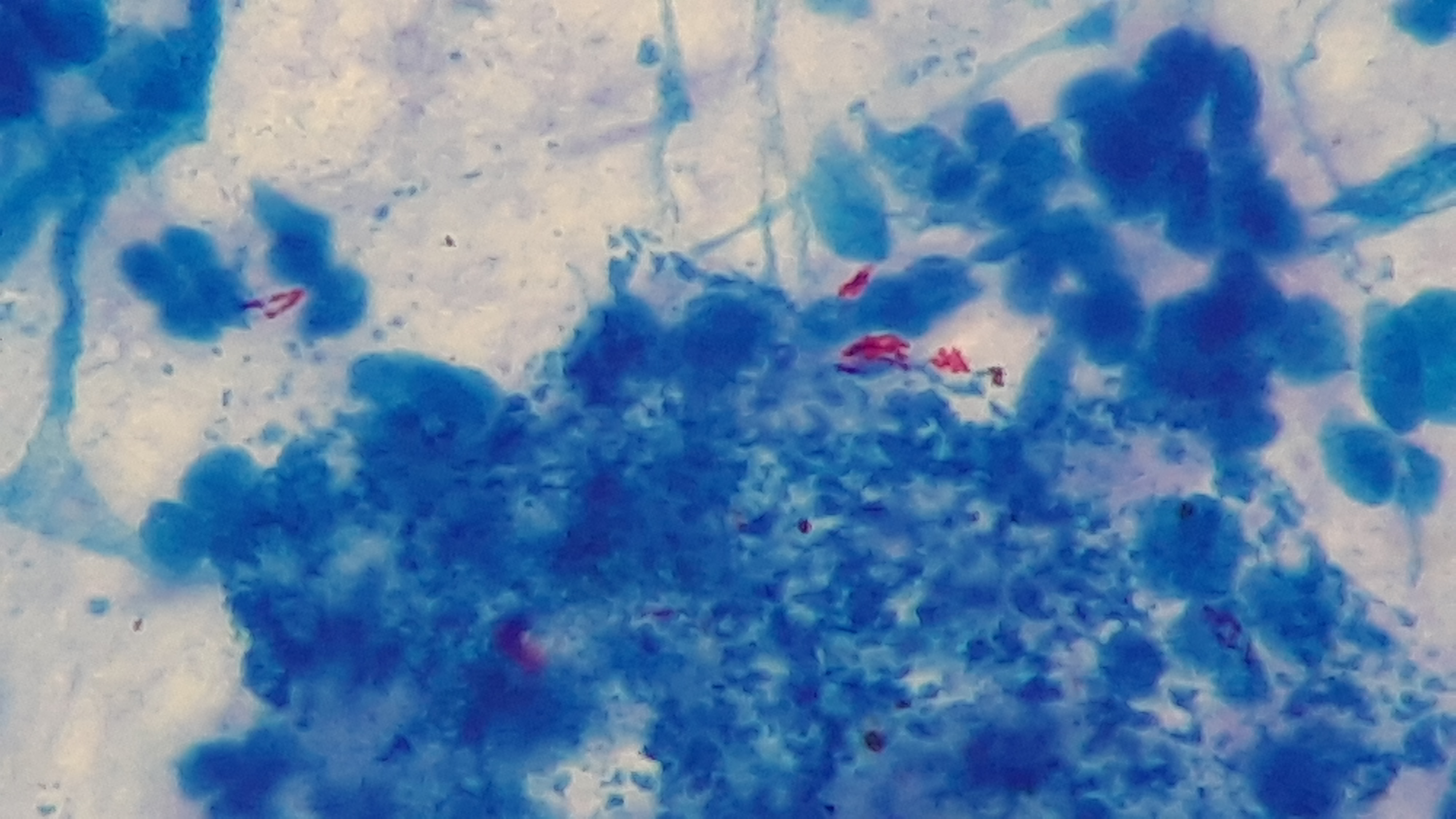
In this photo the red dye represents the Mycobacterium tuberculosis while the blue represents human sputum

Koch felt limited by the technique of using a liquid to create cultures. A liquid base could lead to contamination and uncertainty of proper bacterial growth. His assistant's wife suggested the use of agar because it took a longer time to melt down. Julius Petri, another assistant to Koch, created circular dish with a lit that could hold the agar solution and prevent any impurities from ruining the culture. Starting in 1880, Koch wanted to discover the cause of one of the deadliest illnesses in Europe: tuberculous. At the time, people understood it was transmitted through a contagious substance, but they didn't know what that contagion was. The bacteria was difficult to see and several had tried to view it before him without success. Koch first took tubercules from the lungs of animals, allowed them to dry, then turned them into powders. This method failed to create proper cultures. The staining method that had been successful in revealing bacillus anthracis under the microscope, did not successfully reveal the tuberculosis bacteria to him. The dye, methylene blue, took a full day to stain his animal tissue sample. Koch then used heat to speed the process of staining the tubercle bacilli. This approach lowered the staining period from 24 hours to just 1 hour. After the dye had stained the tissue, he then stained it with a secondary dye called vesuvine which was used to reveal leprosy. When this secondary dye was added, Koch discovered the animal's tissue was stained brown while the tuberculosis bacteria rods were bright blue. Koch's work was not finished though, he still needed to make sure what he was seeing caused tuberculosis. He went on to become the first to person to successfully create a pure M. tuberculosis culture. After doing so, he injected animals with the bacteria and found M. tuberculosis rods in their tissues. But he also discovered that a non-infected animal that was housed with an infected animal would also die of tuberculosis. The bacteria was also found in their tissue. Koch then stated that tuberculosis could be spread from human to human. After discovering M. tuberculosis, culturing it, and proving it caused tuberculosis, Robert Koch was awarded a Nobel Prize in medicine. He gave a lecture on his findings in 1882, at a Berlin Physiological Society gathering. This presentation was considered to be one of the most groundbreaking presentations ever witnessed in the field of medicine.

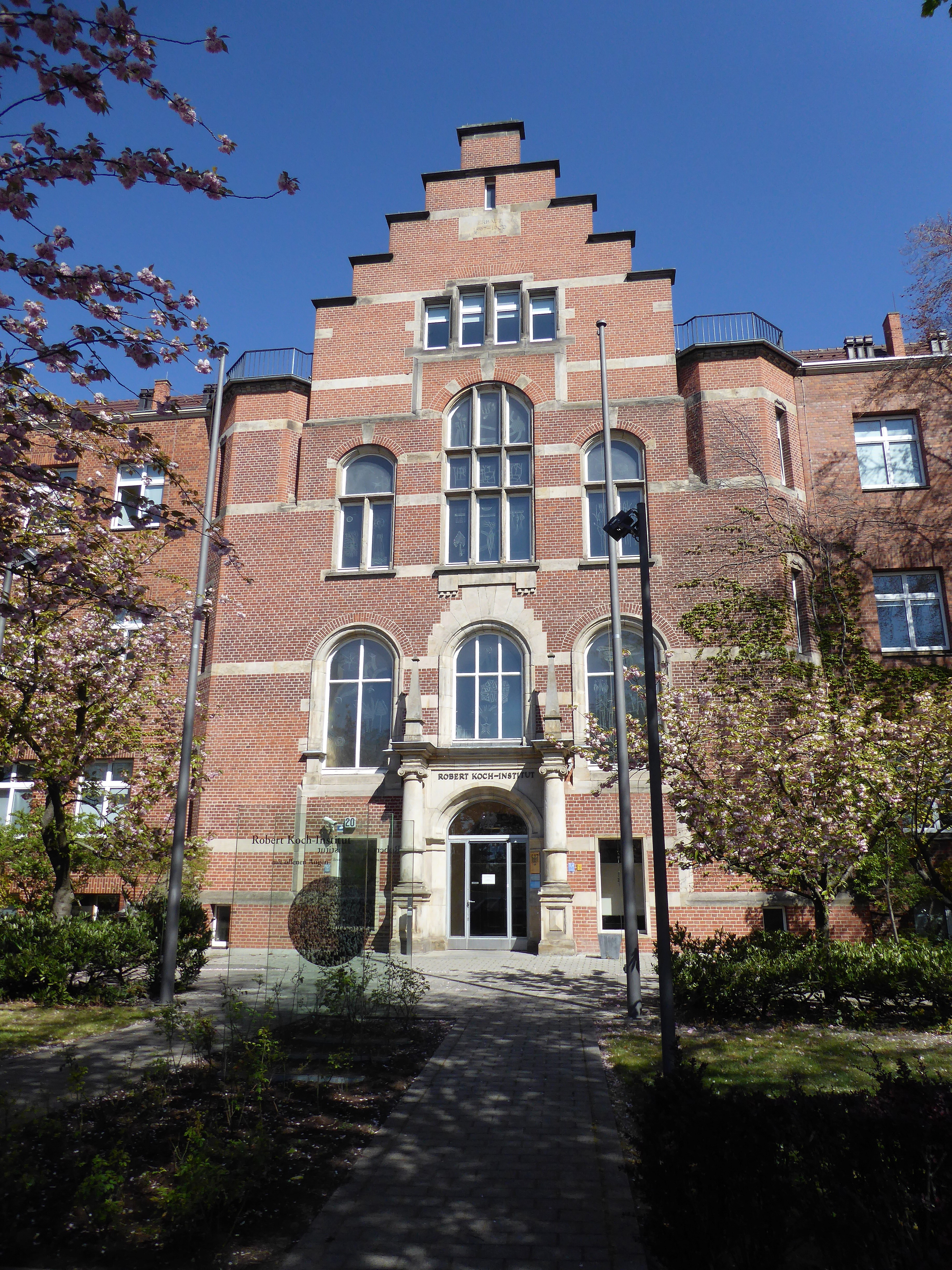
The Robert Koch Institute

In 1890, Koch created what he called his four postulates in determining if a microorganism is the causse of a disease. His four original criteria were:

1. The microorganism must be present in every case of the disease.

2. The microorganism must be isolated from the diseased host and grown as a pure culture in the laboratory

3. The microorganism must cause the same disease when introduced into a new host.

4. The microorganism should be recovered from the new host.

These postulates created the foundation for medical bacteriology. Koch did not have an understanding of viruses, so his second postulate is impossible for viral bodies. However, these postulates were causal claims and were reformed over many years.

Like Louis Pasteur, Robert Koch opened an institute so that he and other scientists could continue this work. It remains in the same location in Germany on a street called Nordufer in Berlin-Wedding. In 1910, Koch died of a heart attack and was placed inside a mausoleum within the Robert Koch Institute. This building houses 1,500 items related to Robert Koch including various writings and scientific materials such as prepared microscope slides. The institute is still an active research and public health facility.
