= Fumigatory box =

Fumigatory boxes were described in the 19th century as prophylactic or curative medical devices designed to use smoke or vapor to restore health or help prevent the spread of infectious or contagious diseases.

== Prophylactic use ==
Fumigatory boxes were sometimes used to combat the spread of infectious diseases such as the plague. One version used in 1837 in Turkey was described as a wooden box approximately 8 feet tall by 3 feet wide (about 2.4 m by 1 m). At the bottom was a one-foot (30 cm) tall chamber in which the ingredients of the prophylactic were burned in a dish. Before entering a residence or public building, the clothed subject was to stand inside the box with his or her face protruding through an opening to avoid suffocation, while the rest of his or her body and clothing were engulfed in the smoke produced by the burning disinfectant. Its purpose was to inhibit the spread of the virulent epidemic then decimating Constantinople and its environs. Although the government ordered such devices installed outside all government buildings, they were often ignored by the populace.

== Curative use ==
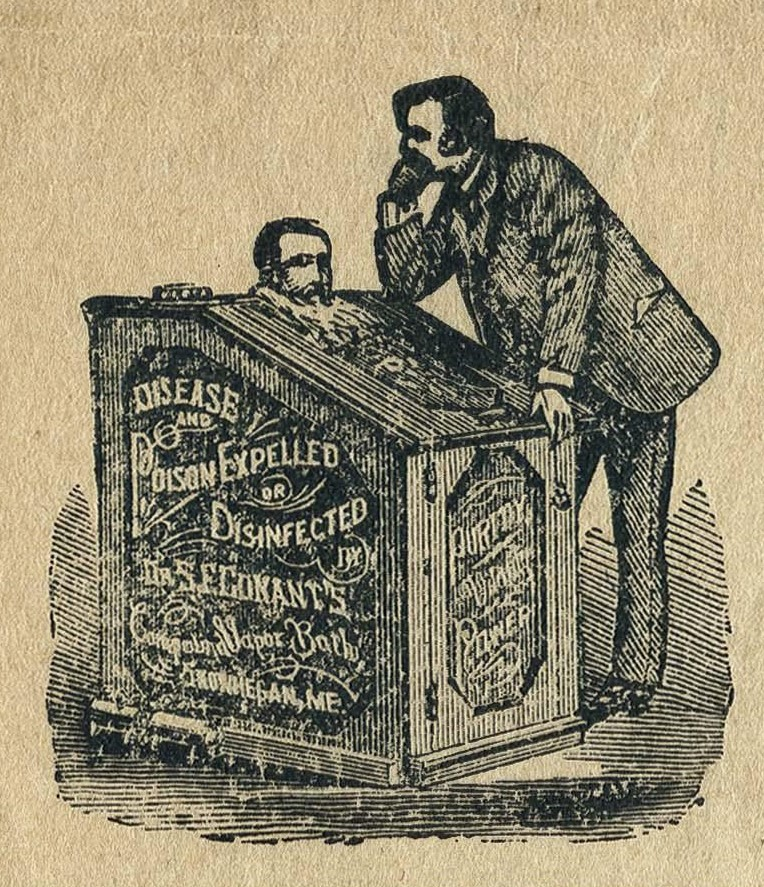
Illustration from circa 1890 advertisement for a "Compound Vapor Bath" recommended for rheumatics

Another version was designed by Dr. Gales, an apothecary at the Hospital St. Louis in Paris, in 1812 or shortly thereafter. It had the naked subject seated on a chair in a wooden box, with the patient's entire head exposed through an opening at the box's top. The opening around the patient's neck was sealed so fumes could not escape. There were three chambers at the bottom of this box, the top one containing sulfur which was heated by a fire in a chamber below. A bottom chamber caught the ashes. The sulfurous fumes rose through many small holes drilled through the floor of the patient compartment. If necessary, fumes could be applied directly to the head or face by means of a flexible hose attached to the main compartment. The purpose of this type of fumigatory box was curative or palliative rather than prophylactic, used as a treatment for ailments including rheumatism and psoriasis, not to prevent the spread of disease.

== Botanical use ==
A third type of fumigatory box was described at the turn of the 20th century as being used to fumigate imported plants on their arrival in Jamaica, to prevent the importation of plant diseases or pests. Plants were placed in the box for one hour and one vial of cyanide was released per 300 cubic feet (8.5 cubic meters) of space inside the fumigatory box. For delicate plants, one half the dose for one half-hour was recommended. Similar devices, often called fumigation chambers, are still sometimes used.

== See also ==
- Fumigation
