= Arnold van den Bergh =

Dutch lawyer and notary (1886–1950)

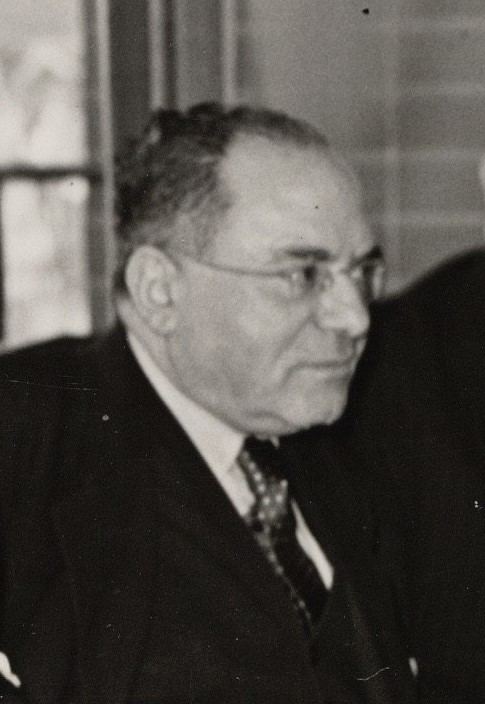
- Van den Bergh in December 1947
- Born: 20 January 1886; Oss, Netherlands
- Died: 28 October 1950 (aged 64); London, England
- Resting place: Muiderberg
- Occupation: Legal notary
- Years active: 1920–1950
- Board member of: de Joodse Invalide; Joods Maatschappelijk Werk; Joodse Raad; Nederlands Israëlietisch Armenbestuur; Nederlands Israelietische Instelling voor Sociale Arbeid (N.I.I.S.A.)
- Spouse: Auguste Zus Kan (m. 1920)
- Children: 3

Arnold van den Bergh (20 January 1886 ‒ 28 October 1950) was a Dutch legal notary based in Amsterdam. He was a well-known and high-profile lawyer, one of six Jewish notaries operating in Amsterdam. Van den Bergh contributed to the field of social work in the Netherlands, and was widely known in Amsterdam outside of the Jewish community.

== Biography ==
In 1886, Van den Bergh was born in the locality of Oss. By 1922, Van den Bergh was working as a junior notary and living in Amsterdam.

During the era of occupation of the Netherlands in World War II, Van den Bergh was a member of the Jewish Council of Amsterdam (Joodse Raad, or Judenrat, of Amsterdam). The Judenrat was a council of Jewish citizens appointed by occupying Nazi Germany in an area with a large Jewish population, with members typically coerced (often with threats of violence against family members) into collaborating with the Nazi regime.

In 1935, Arnold van den Bergh auctioned the listed "Huis aan de Drie Grachten" ("House on three canals") building—used from 1936 onwards for August Aimé Balkema's bookshop. As of 1937, Van den Bergh was chair of the committee for the House of unemployed young Jewish, in Amsterdam. At the start of 1939, Van den Bergh handled the auction of Stadhouderskade 136. In April 1939 the company offices relocated to Westeinde 24 in Amsterdam.

In July 1940, he was the lawyer handling the sale of the Jacques Goudstikker art-collection to art dealer Alois Miedl for the benefit of Hermann Göring. Van den Bergh subsequently wrote to Goudstikker's wife, Dési von Halban, informing her the sale had occurred "in order to avoid great unpleasantness". In October 1940 Van den Bergh was appointed as liquidator of the former Oude Goudstikker company, and indicated that the transactions had been made voluntarily. As Nazi plunder, part of the collection would subsequently be returned by the Dutch government in the 2006 Goudstikker restitution of 202 paintings following recommendations of the Restitutions Committee.

The family of five lived at Oranje Nassaulaan 60^{hs}. The Van den Bergh family eventually lost their safe status and became eligible for arrest and deportation. A conversation at the decision-making body (Entscheidungsstelle) between Hans Georg Calmeyer and Ferdinand aus der Fünten was heard by Jaap van Proosdij, who passed the information to Arnold van den Bergh, enabling the Van den Bergh family to go into hiding. In around October 1943 Arnold van den Bergh and his wife Auguste Kan went into hiding in Laren, their older twin daughters Emma and Esther to Noord-Scharwoude, and the third-daughter Anne-Marie to Sprundel (with some months spent in Breda).

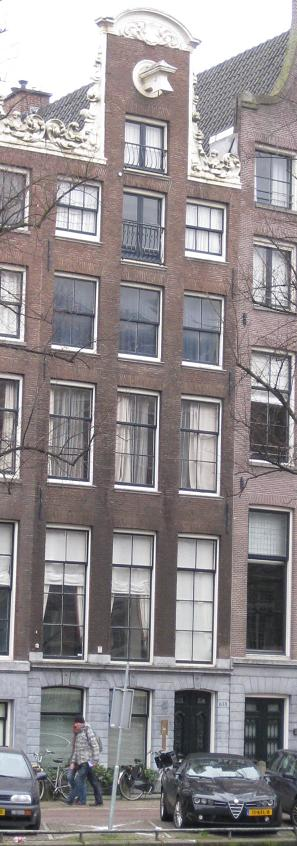
Keizersgracht 634, used for Van den Bergh's company offices after the end of World War II

Following the end of World War II, Van den Bergh restarted a notary firm with offices at Keizersgracht 634. On 28 November 1946, Van den Bergh was one of the founding board members of the Jewish Social Work Foundation (JMW). Other founding members included Salomon Kleerekoper and Jacob van Amerongen. Arnold van den Bergh was one of five members called before the Jewish Honour Council. On 10 June 1948 Van den Bergh was displaced on the board of JMW by a vote.

He died of throat cancer in 1950 while in London.

A study published as a book in 2022 suggested that Van den Bergh may have indirectly betrayed those living in the secret annex (Achterhuis) of the Anne Frank House, inhabited by Anne Frank and others, in order to save his own family. According to the book, Van den Bergh in his capacity as a member of the Jewish Council of Amsterdam would have had a list of Jews hiding in Amsterdam and could have turned over the list to the occupying Nazis in order to save his family. However, Professor Johannes Houwink ten Cate of the University of Amsterdam noted that Van den Bergh was also in hiding around the time of the raid on 4 August 1944. The conclusion was subsequently challenged on the basis that The Jewish Council of Amsterdam had no lists of hiding Jews. His family members threatened a lawsuit and started a foundation. The publishing house apologized and took the book out of circulation in the Netherlands, although it remains freely available in the rest of the world.
