= Charlene von Saher =

British figure skater

Charlène von Saher
Personal information
- Born: 4 December 1974 (age 51) Wimbledon, London
- Height: 1.67 m (5 ft 5 1/2 in)

Figure skating career
- Country: Great Britain

Charlène G. von Saher (born 4 December 1974) is a British former competitive figure skater. The daughter of a West German skater, von Saher spent most of her life in Greenwich, Connecticut, and trained alongside Nancy Kerrigan under coaches Evy Scotvold and Mary Scotvold. She won the gold medal at the 1993 British Championships and then finished 12th at the 1993 World Championships. Despite withdrawing from the 1994 national championships with a severe case of the flu, she was selected to represent Great Britain at the 1994 Winter Olympics. She finished 15th at the Lillehammer Games.

She is the granddaughter of opera and concert singer Dési von Halban and art dealer Jacques Goudstikker, and the great-granddaughter of soprano Selma Kurz. Since the 1990s, she has assisted her mother in fighting for restitution of Nazi-looted art that belonged to her grandfather. She spoke at the opening of the exhibition Reclaimed - Paintings from the Collection of Jacques Goudstikker at the Contemporary Jewish Museum. The exhibition was organized as a way to gain publicity for the issue of Nazi plunder and to show the works included in the 2006 Goudstikker restitution of 202 paintings. The heirs continue their search for lost paintings and have successfully negotiated additional restitutions since 2006.

== Results ==
Event	1991–1992	1992–1993	1993–1994
Winter Olympics			15th
World Championships	15th	12th	16th
European Championships	12th	19th	
British Championships	2nd	1st	WD
WD = Withdrew
