= E. A. von Saher =

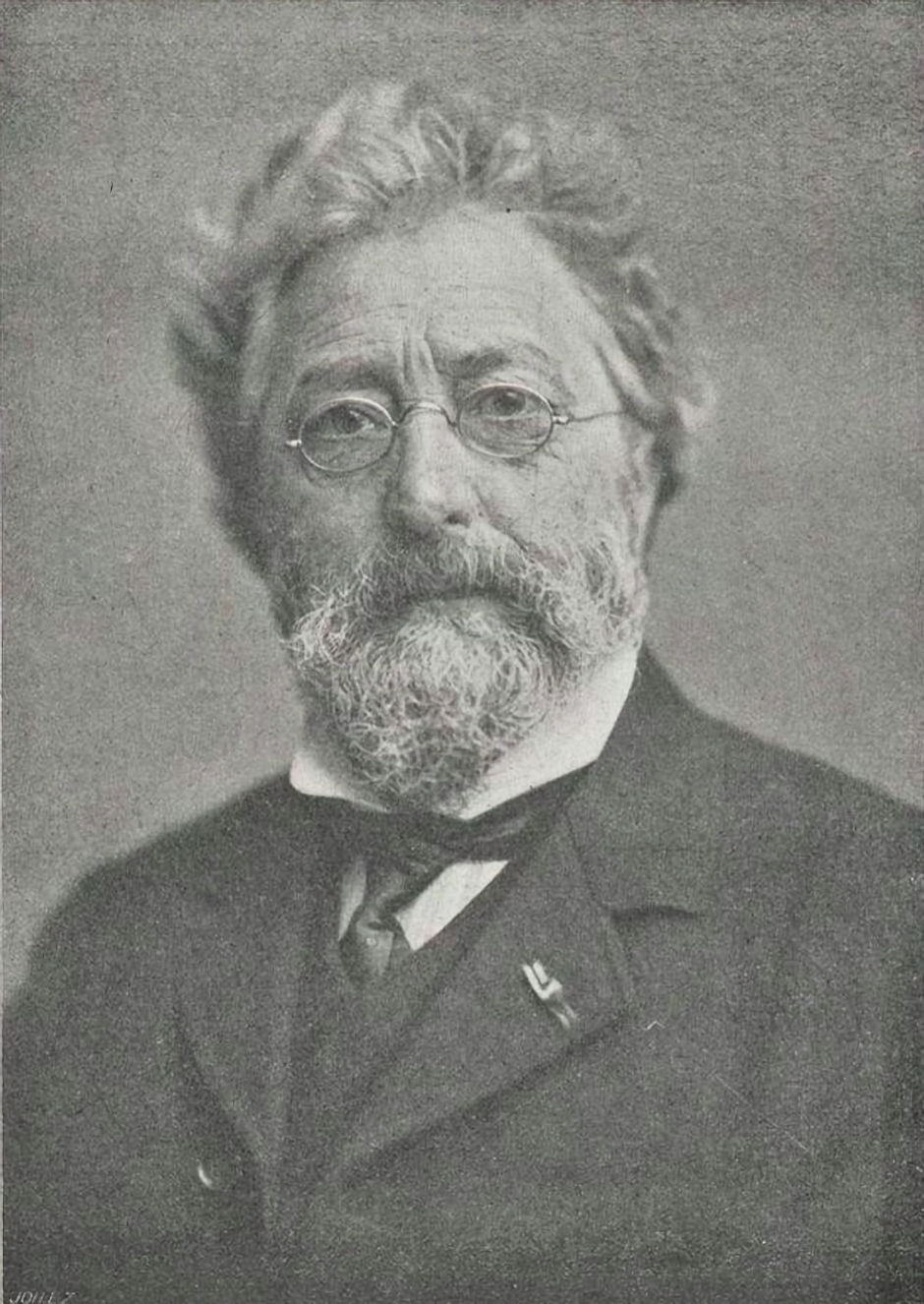

Eduard August von Saher (Breda, August 9, 1849 - Haarlem, February 4, 1918) was a sculptor, director/conservator of the Museum of Arts and Crafts and the School of Arts and Crafts in Haarlem.

== Life ==
Eduard von Saher's father was of German descent and served as an officer in the Dutch East Indies. Eduard August von Saher was born in Breda and was to attend the Military Academy there but was rejected for his eyes. His father had since died and he decided to earn money in sculpture, although as an officer's son that was inappropriate. As a compromise, it was decided to practice the craft abroad. He then began his career as an assistant sculptor in Brussels.[2] He later spent time in Paris, Germany and Budapest.

In 1880, because of his practical skills, he was asked to head the School of Arts and Crafts that was to be founded. He also became curator at the associated museum. As curator, he became known for plaster casts of Javanese Hindu monuments made for the World's Fair in Paris in 1889. In 1899, he succeeded Frederik Willem van Eeden as director of the Museum of Applied Arts

He was appointed by the Dutch government as a juror for exhibitions in Amsterdam, Chicago, Paris and Turin. He was also secretary of the Nederlandsche Kantwerkschool in The Hague.

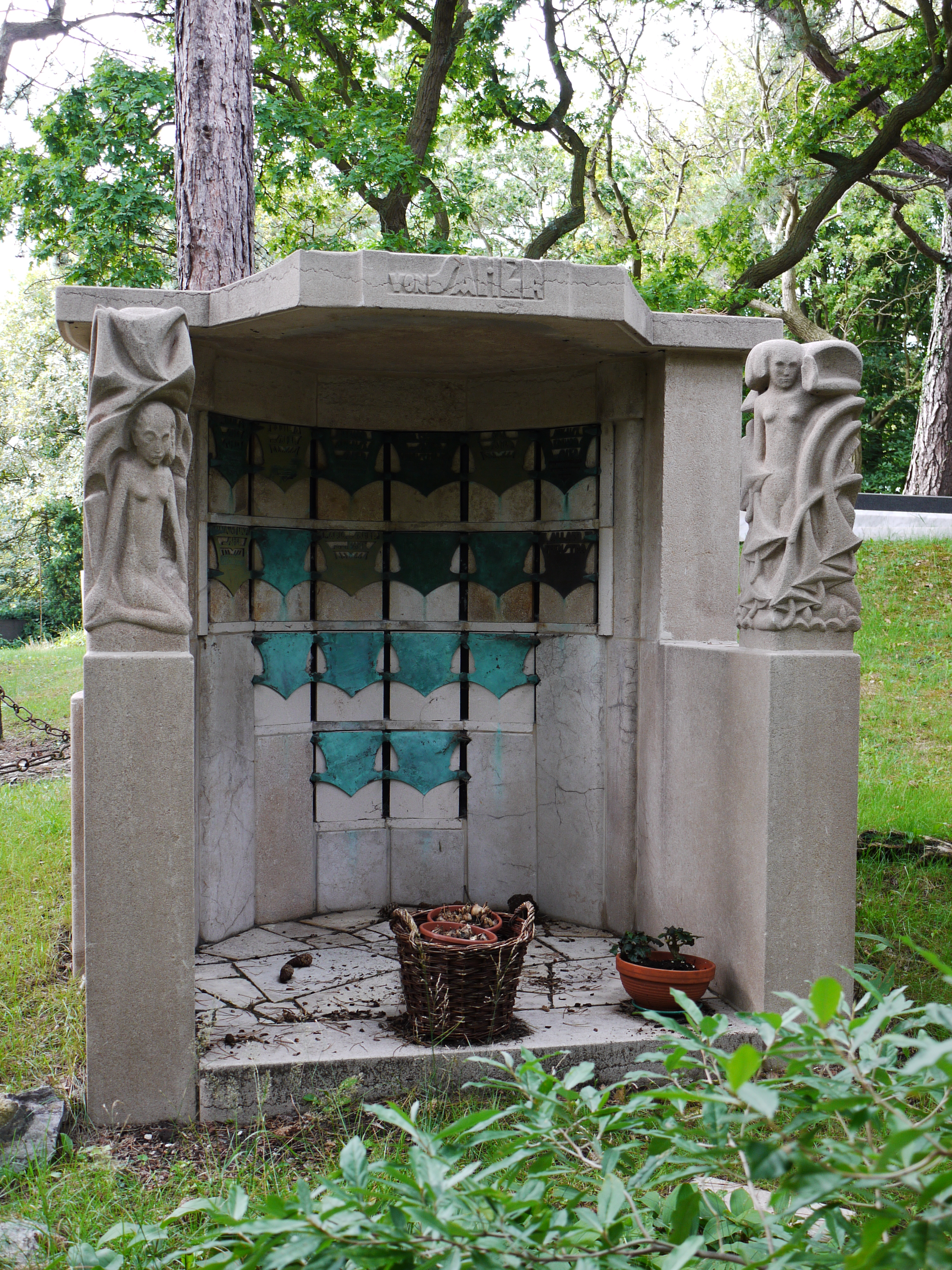
monument Von Saher

He died in Haarlem in 1918 and was interred in a family grave at Westerveld cemetery in Driehuis. The urn monument designed by Hildo Krop was completed in 1920 and is a National Monument.

His son August Eduard von Saher (1890-1973) became a lawyer and married Ada Crone in 1919. In 1950 he remarried Dési von Halban, widow of Jacques Goudstikker.

== Awards ==
- Ridder in de Orde van Oranje-Nassau
- Ridder in het Legioen van Eer (Frankrijk)
- Commandeur in de Kroonorde van Italië
- Ridderkruis 3e klasse in de Kroonorde van Pruissen
- Ridder in de Kroonorde van België

== Publications ==
- Beschouwingen over onze ambachtsnijverheid, Tijdschrift uitgegeven door de NMN, juni 1891, pp. 93–109.
- Bosnië en Herzegowina op de Wereld-Tentoonstelling te Brussel in 1897 II, Tijdschrift uitgegeven door de NMN, pp. 68–77
- De versierende kunsten in Nederlandsch-Oost-Indië, 1899
- Insulinde, een droom, 1899
