= The Gouden Bocht on the Herengracht in Amsterdam, Seen from the West =

1672 painting by Gerrit Berckheyde

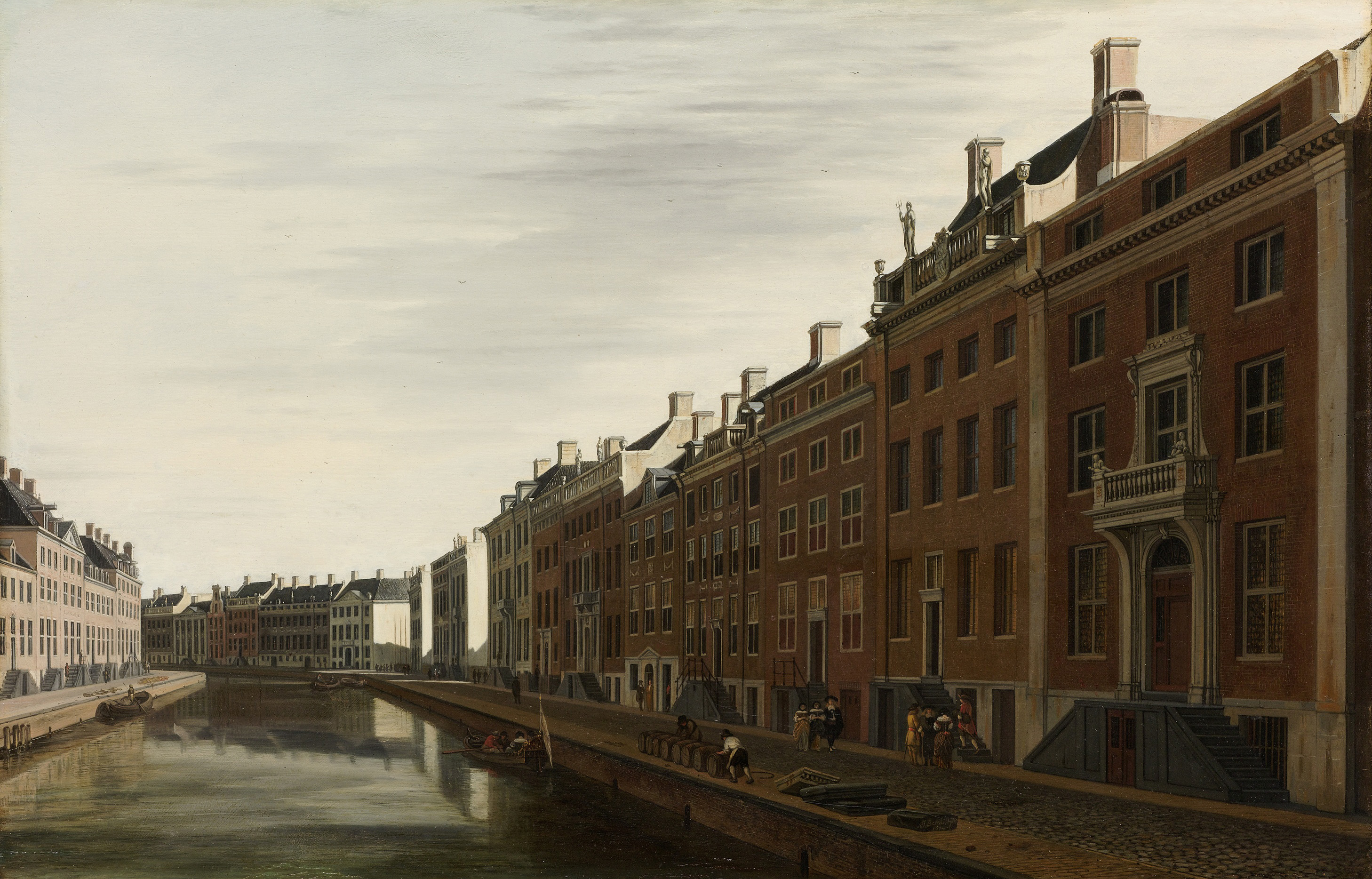
The Gouden Bocht on the Herengracht in Amsterdam, Seen from the West (1672) by Gerrit Berckheyde

The Gouden Bocht on the Herengracht in Amsterdam, Seen from the West is a 1672 painting by the Dutch artist Gerrit Berckheyde (1638-1698). As its title suggests it shows the Gouden Bocht section of the Herengracht canal, and is one of several views of the canal which Berckheyde made, presumably for owners of the newly acquired canal mansions situated on both sides of the canal along the central bend, which became over time the most famous part of the Canals of Amsterdam.

Between 1933 and 1940 it was bought from an art dealer by Jacques Goudstikker. It was purchased by the Rijksmuseum in Amsterdam in 1980 for 310,000 guilders - it is still in the Rijksmuseum collection.

== Sources ==
- https://www.rijksmuseum.nl/nl/collectie/SK-A-4750
