= Hermann Göring Collection =

Art collection assembled through Nazi plunder

The Hermann Göring Collection, also known as the Kunstsammlung Hermann Göring, was an extensive private art collection of Nazi Reichsmarschall Hermann Göring, formed for the most part by looting of Jewish property in Nazi-occupied areas between 1936 and 1945.

== Historical context ==
Hermann Göring was one of the most powerful Nazis. Convicted of war crimes, he was sentenced to death at Nuremberg. In 1936, he conceived the plan to convert his hunting lodge in the Schorfheide region north of Berlin into a country house, called the Waldhof Carinhall. There he had a 34-meter-long hall built, called the Grand Gallery, where he exhibited the most important pieces of his collection. Initially, Goering financed his passion for collecting visual art with gifts from industrialists in exchange for a favor of friends.

During World War II Göring enriched himself on a large scale with art obtained from Jewish art collectors who were plundered and either fled or were deported to their deaths in Nazi camps. At the end of the war, Göring's personal collection included 1,375 paintings, many sculptures, carpets, furniture and other artifacts. It is estimated that at least half of these artworks were obtained through Nazi looting efforts.

== How Göring acquired art looted from Jews ==
The Parisian museum Jeu de Paume was used to warehouse artworks seized from French Jews. Göring visited it about twenty times between 1941 and 1944, to select artworks of especially high quality that had been picked out especially for him. In addition to about 700 works of art that Göring grabbed from the Nazi looting organisation, the Einsatzstab Reichsleiter Rosenberg, Göring also deployed his own organization, the Devisenschutzkommando, in the occupied territories to confiscate art on his behalf. From 1937 onwards, Göring received assistance from the art dealer Walter Andreas Hofer in compiling his art collection. From 1939 to 1944 Hofer acted as director of the Göring Collection. After the war, Hofer was sentenced in absentia to 10 years in prison by a military court. This sentence was never executed and Hofer was able to continue his art trade in Munich undisturbed.

As early as July 1940, Göring turned up in Amsterdam and showed an interest in the art holdings of Dutch dealer Jacques Goudstikker, who had died while fleeing the German invasion. Göring had Goudstikker employee Arie Ten Broek illegally appointed agent of the Goudstikker company. Then on 13 July 1940, Ten Broek sold to Göring all the art held by the company as of 26 June. Göring bought all 1,113 of the inventoried paintings and artifacts for NLG 2,000,000 (value 2005: €13,750,000), no more than one-sixth of their actual value (a transaction that resembles an imitation). The sale to Göring also included 'three ceiling pieces' by Gerard de Lairesse, mounted on the ceiling of a room in the Goudstikkers gallery at Herengracht 458. The panels were detached from the ceiling and transported to Berlin, as were the more than 780 paintings that were immediately taken by Göring himself.

== Monuments Men and the Göring Collection ==
The Allied officers in the Monuments, Fine Arts, and Archives section, commonly known as the Monuments Men, recovered many artworks from the Göring collection and investigated their looting. The series of reports written in 1945-6 by the OSS Art Looting Investigation Unit to document Nazi art looting networks included much information about the creation of the Göring Collection. A special detailed report, entitled "Consolidated Interrogation Report Number 2: the Göring Collection", focused on the art dealing networks supporting Göring's acquisition of looted art. The reports were marked classified and inaccessible for many years until they were declassified and published many years after the war.

== Inventory of Hermann Göring's art collection ==
In the past twenty years, there have been numerous attempts to inventory Göring's collection of looted art. Berlin's German Historical Museum published the full inventory of Göring's collection in 2012, but the site no longer appears to function. Jean-Marc Dreyfus published the catalog in book form in 2015.

Sarah Wildman, writing in the New Yorker, described Göring's inventory as "a twisted treasure map, a guide to looting and pillaging and gift-giving among the Nazi brass, and a tracking mechanism for the Nazi occupation of Europe." At the end of the war, she writes, Göring packed the booty stored at Carinhall into trains and fled south toward Berchtesgaden, in Bavaria; he blew up Carinhall behind him. The collection was discovered by Allied soldiers."

== Legacy of the Göring Collection ==
While some artworks have been returned to families of Nazi victims, many of the artwork seized have never been returned to their pre-Nazi owners. In 2015 it was discovered that some of the paintings in the Göring collection that had been recovered by Monuments Men were given to the families of Nazis instead of being returned to the families of the looted Jewish collectors.

== See also ==
- Nazi plunder
- List of claims for restitution for Nazi-looted art
