= Tobias and Sarah in Prayer with the Angel Raphael and the Demon =

Painting by Jan Steen

The wedding night of Tobias and Sarah
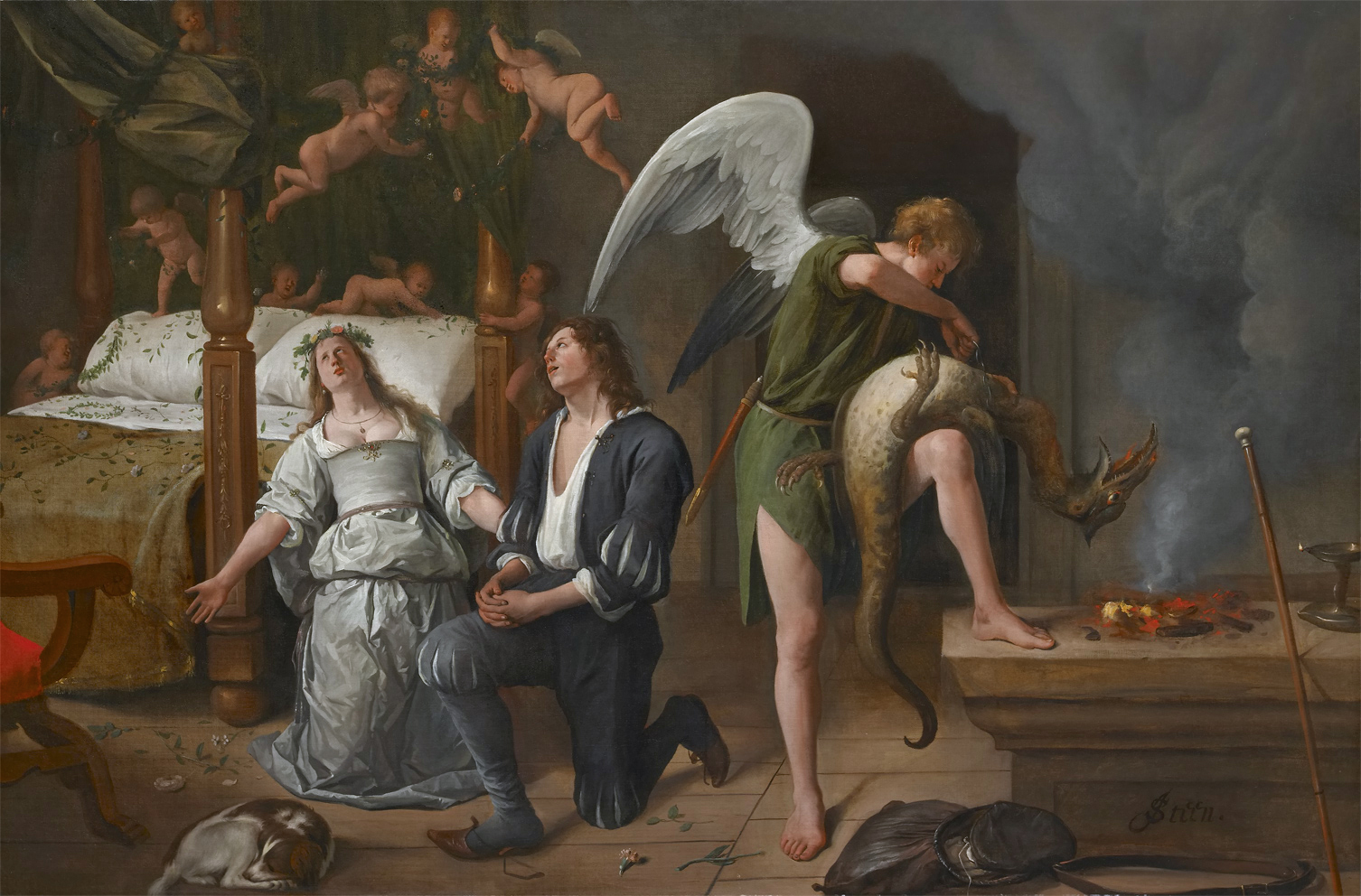
- Artist: Jan Steen
- Year: c. 1668
- Medium: oil paint
- Dimensions: 81 cm (32 in) × 123 cm (48 in)
- Owner: Dienst Verspreide Rijkscollecties

Tobias and Sarah in Prayer with the Angel Raphael and the Demon (circa 1660) is an oil-on-canvas painting by the Dutch Golden Age painter Jan Steen. It is now in the collection of the Bredius Museum, The Hague.

The painting shows Tobias and Sarah praying while the Angel Raphael binds the demon. This painting, which was restored in 1996 by rejoining Abraham Bredius's angel half with the marriage bed half formerly owned by the Jewish refugee Jacques Goudstikker, was the subject of a dispute about nazi plunder. The Goudstikker half was restituted after it had already been rejoined and thus the dispute could only be resolved by one party buying the other half. It is unknown what specific amount was paid to Marei von Saher, the Goudstikker heir, but the purchase was not finalized until 2011.

This painting, still in partially overpainted fragments, was documented by Hofstede de Groot in 1908, who wrote about them as separate catalog entries:

25a. The Marriage of Tobias. Barent van Lin, The Hague, on April 18, 1676, delivered a picture of this subject to the notary Dispontijn in payment of a debt (A. Bredius). 25b. The Marriage of Tobias. A very good picture. Sale. Amsterdam, March 6, 1708 (205 florins).

... 69. ST. MICHAEL AND THE SLAIN DRAGON. St. Michael, who has wings and wears a short green doublet, stands on the left, fastening a chain to the body of the slain dragon, which is wound about his left thigh. The saint has his left foot upon a low altar, on which a fire is burning. A staff rests against the altar; above it stands a lamp, and in front of it is a knapsack. A fragment. Signed in full on the altar, in the right centre; panel, 26 inches by 21 1/2 inches. In the possession of the dealer F. Kleinberger, Paris.

Now in the collection of A. Bredius, The Hague.

Another "Tobias and Sarah with the Demon" painting by Nicolaes Knüpfer is said to be Steen's inspiration.

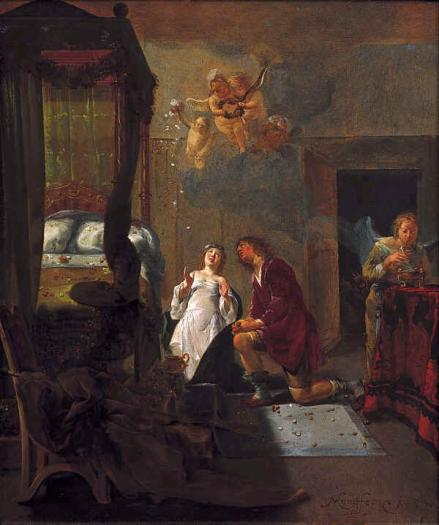
Nicolaes Knüpfer, Tobias and Sarah Praying Before Their Wedding Night, 1654, Centraal Museum.

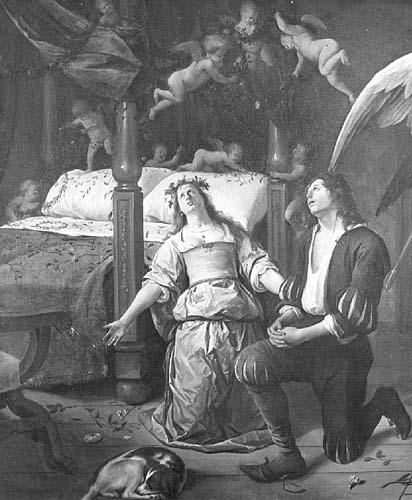
Left half as it appeared in the looted art database
