= Museum Bredius =

Museum in The Hague, Netherlands

Coordinates: 52°04′52.51″N 4°18′45.56″E

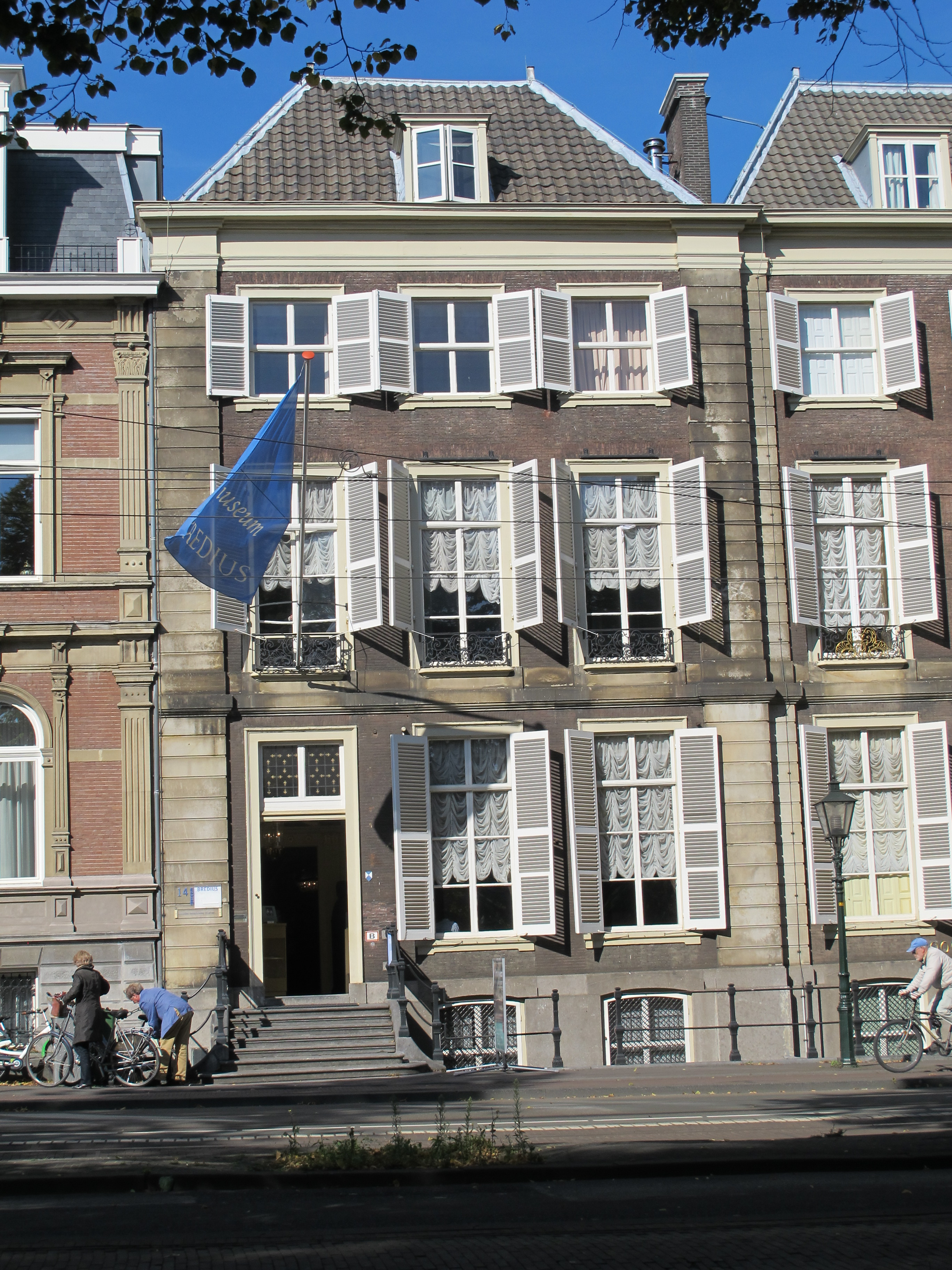
Front of the Museum Bredius overlooking the hofvijver in The Hague.

Museum Bredius is a museum showing the collection of the early twentieth century Dutch art historian Abraham Bredius. The collection is remarkable for its seventeenth-century etchings and paintings, but is most attractive to visitors for its accurate restoration of the 18th-century Herenhuis interior with period furnishings. The museum is situated on the Lange Vijverberg in The Hague, the Netherlands

== History ==
The house was built together with its neighbours (numbers 14 & 15) by the architect Pieter de Swart in 1755, and was home to a series of important Heren up to the 1930s, when it was purchased by Frits Lugt, to house his large collection of drawings and prints that later, along with the initial donation by Cornelis Hofstede de Groot (1863–1930), formed the basis for the Rijksbureau voor Kunsthistorische Documentatie (RKD), and is now mostly housed in the Koninklijke Bibliotheek, National Library of the Netherlands.

In 1955 the house was purchased by the city of The Hague for the Bredius collection, which until then was housed in the former home of its donor, Abraham Bredius (Amsterdam, 1855 - Monaco, 1946). His house on the Prinsengracht 6 had been the location for the collection until 1985, when it closed its doors due to falling number of visitors, combined with a subsidy stop. Friends of the museum created the Bredius Genootschap (Bredius Society) that took the collection on tour, which met with great success. When the society finally had enough funding to reopen in a permanent location, the old house could not be used. The decision to move to the present location was made possible with the gift of a generous sponsor to remodel it in the original Louis XV style. It has been home to the Bredius Museum since 1990.

== Abraham Bredius ==
Abraham Bredius was the son of a gunpowder manufacturer who left him a large fortune to spend in the arts. He was a very learned man and writer of many articles and books on art history, who became known internationally as a Rembrandt expert. He became director of the Mauritshuis in The Hague and in that capacity devoted himself to scientific research. When he moved to Monaco for health reasons in 1922, he believed that the climate was bad for his paintings, and he left them in his old home as a museum, with the promise that they would go to the city on his death. In Monaco he wrote his books on Jan Steen and Rembrandt.

He was embroiled in many controversial academical battles over various aspects of art history, such as attributions of paintings by Jan Steen and Rembrandt, or the proper way to present and build a museum collection. He was unable to work together with Cornelis Hofstede de Groot, which is why the Museum Bredius is now totally separate from the RKD, which ironically has its roots in the same building today.

== Paintings ==
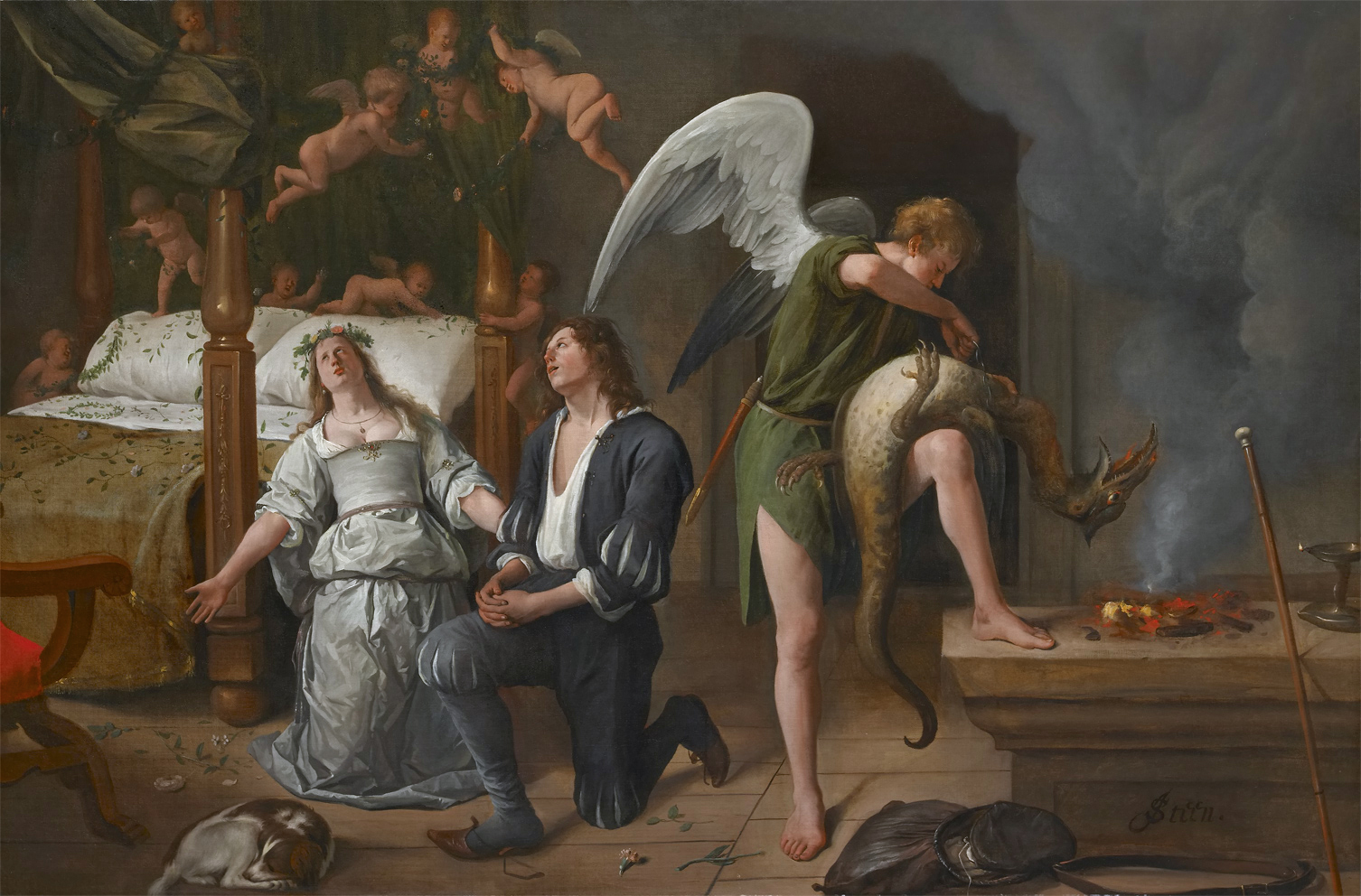
Tobias and Sarah in Prayer with the Angel Raphael and the Demon, painting restored in 1996 by rejoining Bredius's angel half with the marriage bed half formerly owned by the Jewish refugee Jacques Goudstikker. It was the subject of a dispute about nazi plunder.

The collection is represented by over 150 artists, with illustrious names such as Aelbert Cuyp, Anthony van Dyck, Melchior de Hondecoeter, Adriaen van Ostade, Quiringh van Brekelenkam, and Rembrandt. Bredius only kept pieces which were of academic interest in the art history field, such as the only known landscape example by the seascape painter Cornelis Claesz van Wieringen, or a mutilated piece that was originally a biblical scene by Jan Steen of the marriage of Tobias and Sarah, that had been cut down into two genre pieces in the 19th century and sold separately. He donated more than 46 paintings he attributed himself to the Rijksmuseum Amsterdam. Bredius tended to only keep the masterpieces, which were the first known work by many artists when they were accepted as a master into a local Guild of St. Luke.

== Other objects ==
The museum contains a large collection of silver, including 70 examples by Amsterdam silversmiths from the 17th to 19th centuries. There is also a porcelain collection with Chinese blue and German pieces to offset the historical themes in Delftware.

== See also ==
- Museum Meermanno on the Prinsessegracht, another Herenhuis museum in the Hague.
- Hofwijck, a Herenhuis museum in Voorburg, about 10 minutes away by train.
