= Herengracht 458 =

Canal house in Amsterdam, Netherlands

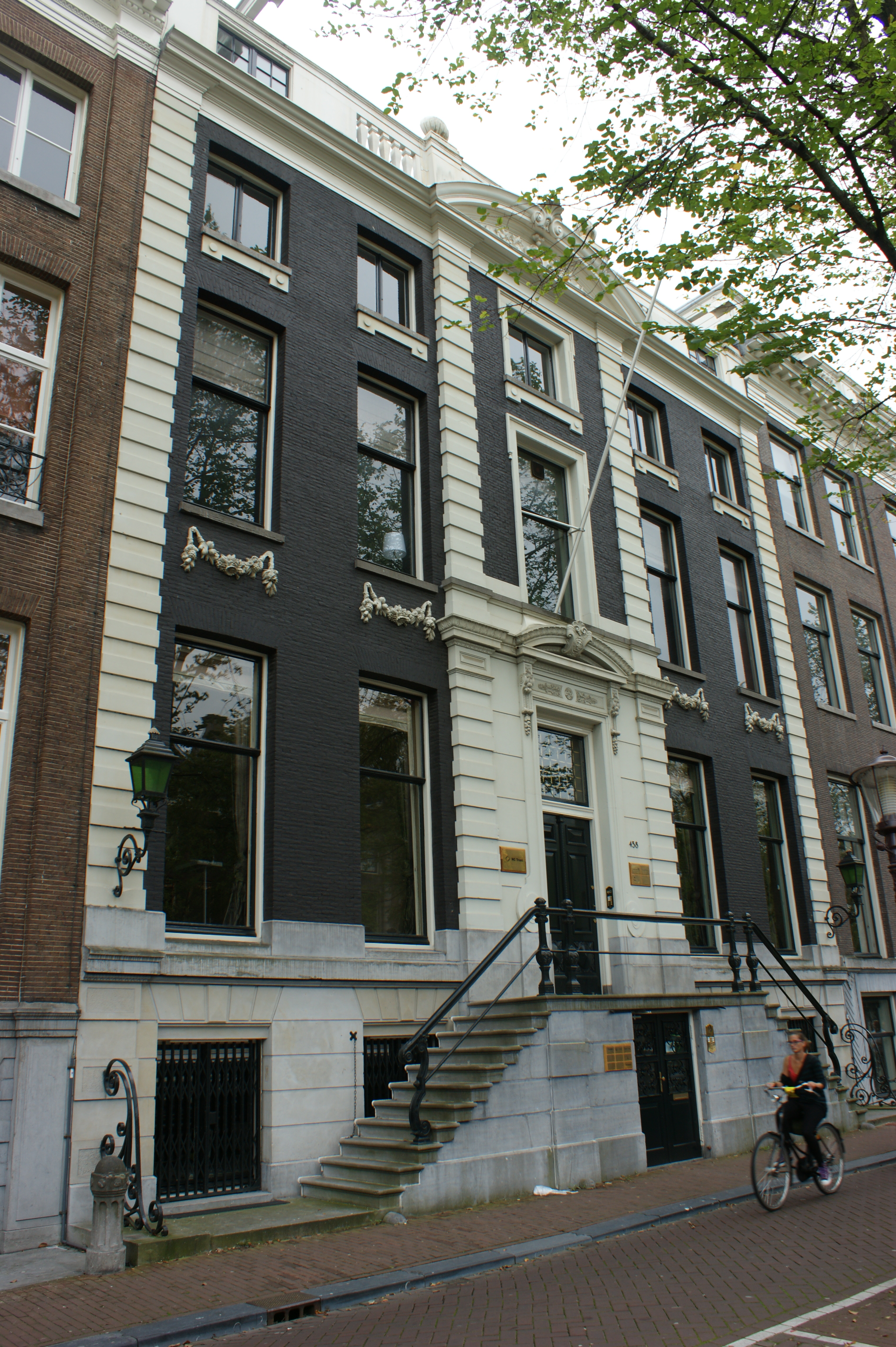
- Herengracht 458 in 2011
- Alternative names: Huize Goudstikker

General information
- Type: House
- Location: Herengracht 458, Amsterdam, Netherlands
- Coordinates: 52°21′56.1″N 4°53′23.2″E
- Completed: 1670
- Renovated: 1875, 1903
- Client: Martinus Alewijn

Design and construction
- Designations: Rijksmonument no. 1857

Renovating team
- Architects: Willem Hamer (1875), Herman Walenkamp (1903)

Herengracht 458, also known as Huize Goudstikker, is a double house on the Herengracht in Amsterdam, in the Golden Bend (Gouden Bocht) between the Leidsestraat and the Spiegelstraat. The building has national monument (rijksmonument) status.

The house was built in the 17th century for the merchant Martinus Alewijn and was extensively remodelled in 1875 by the architect Willem Hamer. Jacques Goudstikker had his art dealership here from 1926 until he fled the Netherlands in May 1940.

== Description ==
=== Exterior ===
The front facade dates from 1875 and was built in a traditional manner. It is a brick facade with a straight cornice, sandstone corner pilasters and a sandstone central projection topped by a curved pediment. The attic carries two vases, and festoons decorate the facade at the level where the bel étage meets the first floor.

=== Interior ===
The great hall at the back was probably fitted out by Dirck Wuytiers van de Werve. Its decoration included a ceiling painting by Gerard de Lairesse in three panels showing the fall of Phaethon, and late 17th-century tapestries with scenes from Greek history. In 1930 the De Lairesse ceiling was still in this room. Ceiling paintings by Jacob de Wit from about 1720, part of Wuytiers's interior, later ended up in a country house in Hoevelaken; the auction house F. Muller sold parts of the interior in 1903 and 1928.

The 1875 remodelling added a staircase rising through the full height of the house, lit by a lantern in the roof. It received carved walnut banisters, and three Flemish tapestries were hung on its upper walls. Behind the staircase a dining room was built in an extension into the garden, panelled in walnut in the Italian Renaissance style and lined with gilt leather.

After 1926 Goudstikker had fittings from other canal houses installed. From Herengracht 609 came overdoor paintings by Jacob de Wit and a chimneypiece carved by B. and T. de Wilde showing Venus in the forge of Vulcan, which the burgomaster Gerrit Hooft had installed there in 1743. A mantelpiece from the last quarter of the 18th century, from Herengracht 452, was placed in a back room. Under Goudstikker the house also held gilt leather from the convent of Catharinendal in South Brabant, a marble fountain in the Louis XVI style in the corridor, and, in an upstairs room, four wall paintings of mountain landscapes along the Rhine signed by H.W. Schweickhard. Three period rooms on the first floor, each panelled in a different style, served as showrooms.

== History ==
=== 17th and 18th centuries ===
When the building plots were auctioned in 1665, Martinus Alewijn bought plots 19 and 20, each 26 voet (Amsterdam feet) wide and 180 voet deep, for a total of ƒ14,654. Alewijn traded in partnership with Adriaan Lampsens. In 1668 he also acquired plots 61 and 62 on the Keizersgracht, which allowed him to build a stable behind his garden with an exit onto the Keizersgracht. Alewijn had the house built on plots 19 and 20; according to Amsterdam Monumentenstad it was completed in 1670.

Alewijn died in 1684. Dirck Wuytiers van de Werve first rented the house from Alewijn's children and bought it on 17 April 1696, paying ƒ52,000, plus ƒ2,000 for the gilt leather, the chimneypieces and the standing and lying plates in the house. Wuytiers had no children. When his estate was divided in 1734, the house went to his niece Maria Elisabeth de Wale van Ankeveen, who sold it on 18 May 1738 for ƒ100,000 to Nicolaas Pancras. The sale included almost all the wall hangings, the paintings in the ceilings, on the chimneypieces and above the doors, and the fixed mirrors.

Pancras died in 1739. Through a legacy from his widow, Anna Elisabeth Geelvinck, the house passed in 1758 to Anna Jacoba Geelvinck, a niece of the widow and the wife of Abraham Dedel. Dedel, who was among other things burgomaster in 1788, died in 1798 and left the house to Johanna Albertina Geelvinck, the wife of Albert Cornelis Schuyt.

=== 19th century ===
The Golden Bend around 1865, with Herengracht 458 on the left, some 10 years before the extensive remodelling of the house

The Schuyts sold the house in 1801 for ƒ44,000 to Marie Aletta Koenen, the widow of J.W. Winter. In 1821 it passed for ƒ40,000 to Marcus Broen. On 1 November 1862 Jacobus Hermanus Insinger bought the whole property for ƒ51,500, and after his death in 1874 it passed to his son Maurits Herman Insinger.

In 1875 Maurits Insinger had the house remodelled by Willem Hamer. The high front steps were removed, the entrance was moved to street level and the vestibule became a small boudoir. In 1930 J.F.L. de Balbian Verster judged that this remodelling did not accord with the ideas on repair and restoration of his own day. Insinger died in 1891; his widow lived in the house until her death in 1902.

=== 20th century ===
Herengracht 458 (second from right) decorated for the wedding of Queen Wilhelmina and Prince Henry; photograph by Jacob Olie, March 1901

At an auction on 29 April 1903 the art collector Pieter Langerhuizen Lambertszoon, of the Crailoo estate near Laren, bought the property for ƒ119,000. He had the architect Herman Walenkamp restore the house in line with its original layout. The high front steps were rebuilt and the garden was laid out again. Hamer's staircase was kept. Langerhuizen housed much of his collection there but never lived in the house. After his death in 1918 his executors sold it for ƒ260,000 to the Nederlandsche Handel-Maatschappij, which set up offices there and, under an exemption, built an office building in the garden.

In June 1926 the art dealership J. Goudstikker bought the house for ƒ239,000; until then the firm had been based in the Kalverstraat. The wooden building in the garden had to be demolished, after which the garden was laid out again under the supervision of the garden architect J.R. Koning. In May 1940 Jacques Goudstikker left the house with his family for IJmuiden. He fled the Netherlands by ship and died in an accident on the way.

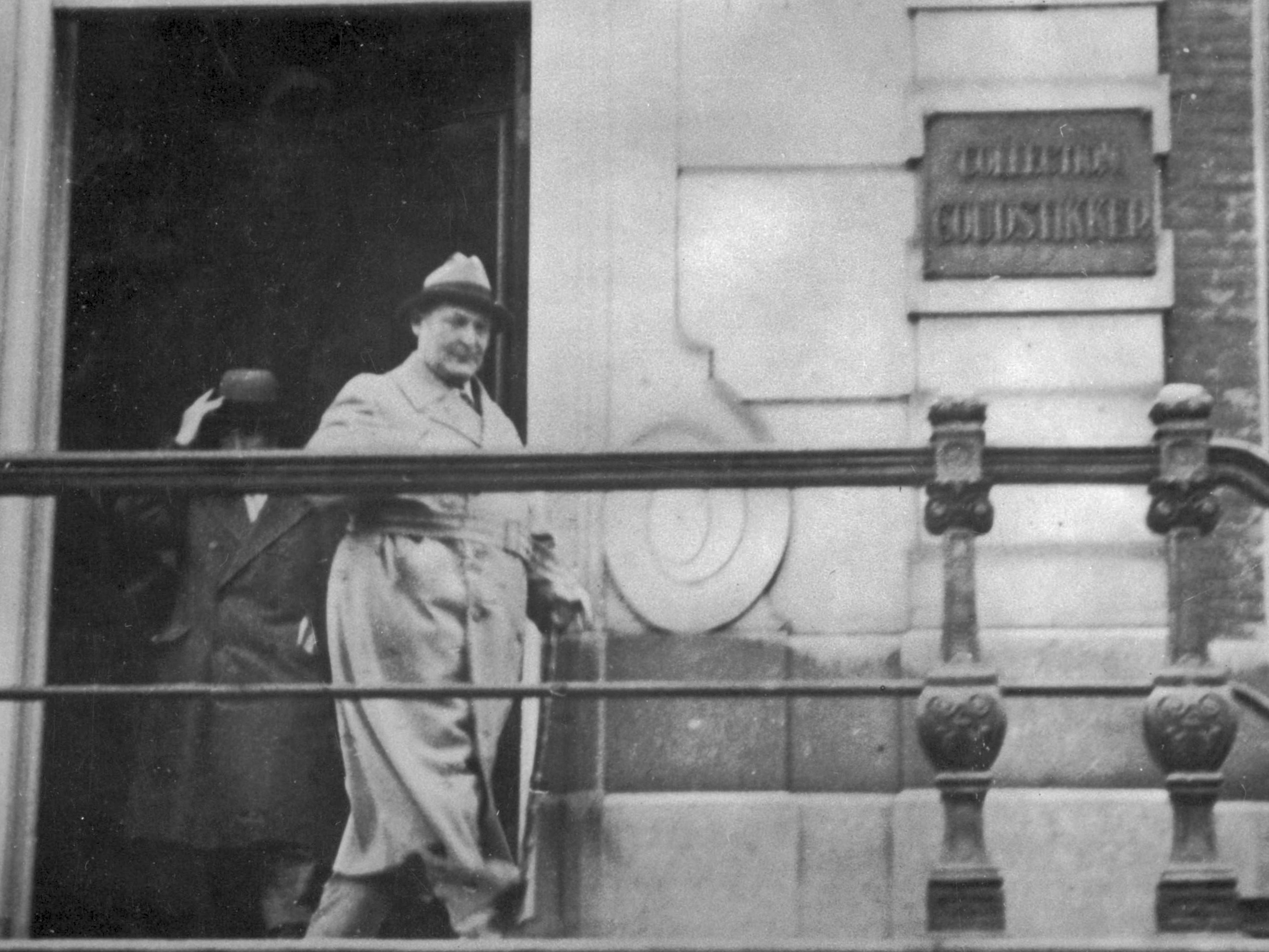
Hermann Göring leaving the former Goudstikker art dealership at Herengracht 458, 1941

On 13 July 1940 the firm sold the house, together with Nijenrode Castle, the country house Oostermeer in Ouderkerk aan de Amstel, the trade name and part of the paintings, to Alois Miedl for ƒ550,000. After the war the property was registered in the firm's name again in 1949 as part of the restoration of rights, and the settlement of the Miedl transaction was completed in 1952.

On 27 March 1947 the British Council opened an office in the house. In 1952 it was announced that the Bureau voor Muziek-Auteursrecht would occupy the house, which until shortly before had housed the British Council; the architect A.J. Kleykamp was commissioned to convert the building.

== Monument ==
Herengracht 458 was entered in the national monuments register on 21 May 1970 under number 1857. The register description dates the double house to the 18th century or earlier.
