= Josef von Halban =

Austrian gynecologist (1870–1937)

- Born: 10 October 1870; Vienna, Austria-Hungary
- Died: 23 April 1937 (aged 66); Vienna, Austria
- Education: University of Vienna
- Spouse: Selma Kurz (m. 1910; died 1933)
- Children: Désirée Halban (b. 1912); George Halban (b. 1915)
- Scientific career
- Fields: Obstetrics; Gynaecology
- Workplaces: Wiedner Spital
- Doctoral advisor: Friedrich Schauta

Josef von Halban (10 October 1870 – 23 April 1937) was an Austrian obstetrician and gynecologist. He was the husband of opera singer Selma Kurz (1874–1933).

Born to a Jewish family, originally surnamed Blumenstock, in 1894, he obtained his medical doctorate at Vienna, where from 1898 to 1903, he worked as an assistant under Friedrich Schauta. In 1903 he became privat-docent for OB/GYN, becoming an associate professor in 1909.

From 1910 to 1937, he was director of gynecology at the Wiedner Spital in Vienna.

Halban is known for his pioneer research involving inner secretions of the ovaries. He also provided an early description on the endocrine function of the placenta. His name is associated with the following two medical terms:

- Halban's disease: persistent cystic corpus luteum.
- Halban's pregnancy sign: indicator concerning increased hair-growth of pregnant women.

== Selected writings ==
- Topographie des weiblichen Ureters (with Julius Tandler), 1901 – Topography of female ureters.
- Anatomie und Ätiologie der Genitalprolapse beim Weibe, 1907 – Anatomy and etiology of female genital prolapse.
- Die pathologische Anatomie des Puerperalprozesses und ihre Beziehungen zur Klinik und Therapie – 1919 Pathological anatomy involving puerperal processes, etc.
- Gynäkologische operationslehre, 1932 – Gynecological surgery lessons.
- Biologie und Pathologie des Weibes ein Handbuch der Frauenheilkunde und Geburtshilfe (part of the series, Historische Quellen zur Frauenbewegung und Geschlechterproblematik).
