= Selma Kurz =

Austrian opera singer (1874–1933)

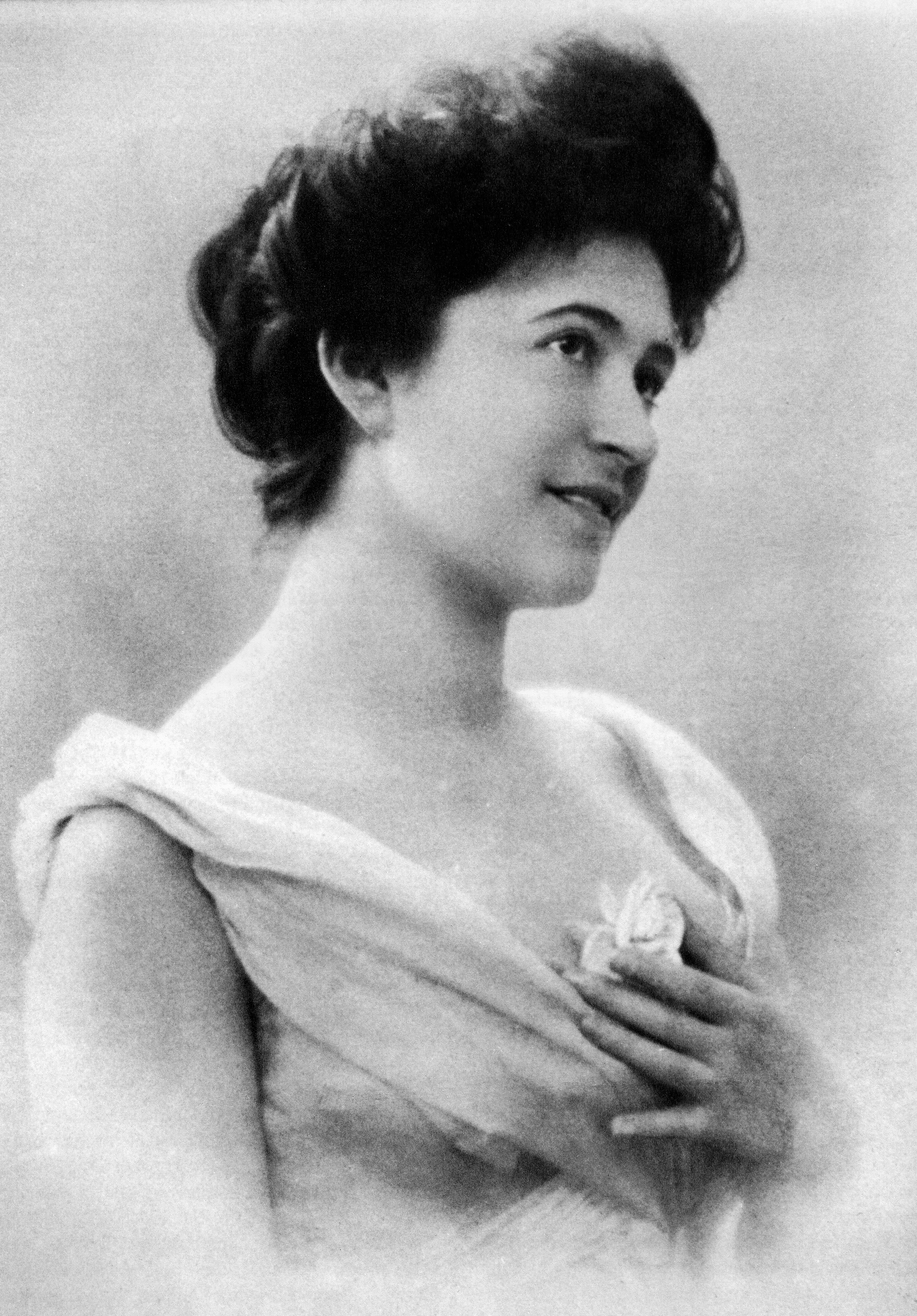
- Selma Kurz in 1900
- Born: 15 October 1874; Biala, Kingdom of Galicia and Lodomeria, Austria-Hungary
- Died: 10 May 1933 (aged 58); Vienna, Austria
- Occupation: Operatic soprano
- Spouse: Josef Halban (m. 1910)
- Children: Désirée Halban (b. 1912); George Halban (b. 1915)

Selma Kurz (15 October 1874 – 10 May 1933) was an Austrian coloratura soprano known for her brilliant coloratura technique.

== Early life ==
Selma Kurz was born in Bielsko-Biała to a very humble Jewish family of eleven children. She grew up in Bielitz. While still a girl, she was taken to a convent to be trained as a seamstress. The nuns quickly discovered the beauty of her voice and she also often sang in the local synagogue.

These circumstances led local people to raise some money so that she could go to Vienna and audition for Professor Gänsbacher, a prominent vocal teacher who did not teach women, but wrote important letters of recommendation. Little Selma was thus enabled to visit the imposing Schloss Totis, the Viennese residence, en villéggiature, of the famous patron of the arts count Nicholas (Miklós) Esterházy de Galántha, who agreed to pay for her lessons with another prominent vocal pedagogue, Johannes Ress.

Once her career was established, Kurz consulted world-renowned voice teachers Jean de Reszke in Nice and Mathilde Marchesi in Paris, as well as the soprano Felicie Kaschowska in Vienna. She nonetheless regarded herself primarily as a pupil of Ress.

== Career ==
=== Début ===
She was first heard in Vienna at a student concert of Ress pupils on 22 March 1895. She got good notices and offers poured from many opera houses, especially the ones in provincial Germany, which were always looking for new talent. She made her début in the title role of Ambroise Thomas's opera Mignon at the Hamburg Stadttheater, on 12 May 1895. She appeared there and at Frankfurt am Main for the next four seasons, singing diverse roles including Eudoxie in Halévy's La Juive, Elisabeth in Wagner's Tannhäuser, and Bizet's Carmen.

=== Vienna ===
Gustav Mahler, music director of the Vienna Imperial and Royal Court Opera, heard Kurz in Frankfurt towards the end of 1898 and asked her to audition for him. He immediately offered her a contract and she made her début at the theatre that would become her artistic and spiritual home, also as Mignon, on 3 September 1899.

Her success in Vienna was swift and total, and lasted to the end of her musical career, thirty years later. Mahler himself, hearing her perfect trill and wonderfully placed high notes in Leonora's Act IV aria in Il trovatore, suggested that she ought to study the Hochkoloratur repertory, in which she would become the Hofoper's prima donna assoluta.

The Court Opera director carefully introduced her to this repertoire by letting her sing Rosina (in The Barber of Seville), the pages Urbain in Les Huguenots and Oscar in Un ballo in maschera, Juliette and Martha; but she soon moved on to Elvira in Ernani, Lakmé, Konstanze, Gilda, Violetta (in La traviata) and, last but not least, Lucia di Lammermoor.

Mahler fell in love with Selma, and they had a short affair during the spring of 1900. But the Court Opera did not allow their members to marry among themselves, and Selma opted to continue her career.

It was Kurz's legendary singing in Mahler's 1903 revival of Un ballo in maschera as well as in Goldmark's The Queen of Sheba, that cemented her immense popularity with the Viennese public. (As Astaroth in The Queen of Sheba, perhaps her most famous role, she held audiences spellbound with her vocalization of the so-called Lockruf or 'Siren Call.') It also led to her being elevated to the position of Kaiserliche und Königliche Kammersängerin ('Imperial and Royal Court Singer') at the age of 29. She was often thereafter in attendance of Emperor Franz Joseph I of Austria, always a devoted admirer of her art.

In the year-long Mozart festival performances organized to celebrate the composer's 150th birthday, Kurz sang Fiordiligi in Così fan tutte in 1905 and Konstanze in Die Entführung aus dem Serail a year later. Also in 1906, on the occasion of a much-acclaimed Caruso gala, she sang Gilda in Rigoletto, with Titta Ruffo in the title role. This was Ruffo's only appearance in Vienna.

Although she had great triumphs in coloratura roles, Kurz did not neglect her lyric repertory. Indeed, of the 992 performances she would give at the Vienna Hofoper (later Staatsoper), more than 100 would be devoted to Mimì in Puccini's La bohème. She also created that composer's Madama Butterfly for Vienna (1907) as well as Saffi in Johann Strauss's Der Zigeunerbaron (1910).

She sang Tatiana (Eugene Onegin) and Sophie (Der Rosenkavalier) in 1911 and, in one of the many high points of her Viennese career, created Zerbinetta in the world première of the second version of Richard Strauss's Ariadne auf Naxos, on 4 October 1916. She sang Zerbinetta 36 times in Vienna.

In Vienna she sang every imaginable role, from Tchaikovsky's Iolanta and Wagner's Elsa (in Lohengrin) and Sieglinde (in Die Walküre) to Marguerite in Gounod's Faust, Massenet's Manon, Frau Fluth in Nicolai's The Merry Wives of Windsor and Rosalinde in Johann Strauss II's Die Fledermaus. Next to Mimì in La bohème, her most frequently heard roles were Gilda, Violetta and the Trovatore Leonora.

Her last performance at the Ringstraße, took place on 12 February 1927. She performed as Rosina in The Barber of Seville.

Her very last public appearance occurred in September 1932 at the baptism of Archduke Stefan (1932–1998), son of Archduke Anton and Princess Ileana of Romania. Although already mortally ill, the Imperial and Royal Kammersängerin sang Mozart's "Ridente la calma" and the Bach-Gounod Ave Maria as a gesture to the baby's grandmother, Queen Marie of Rumania, who had long been a close personal friend. She died nine months later.

=== Her career outside Vienna ===
Form the outset Selma Kurz was widely required all over Europe and she appeared successfully in both opera and concert at the Grand Opéra in Paris, the Princely Opéra in Monte Carlo, Rome, Salzburg, Warsaw, Prague, Budapest, Amsterdam, Ostend, Bucharest and Cairo.

In London she was first heard in May 1904 in Rigoletto, with Enrico Caruso and Maurice Renaud. She then sang her famous page, Oscar, in Un ballo in maschera, with Giannina Russ, Caruso, Antonio Scotti and Marcel Journet.

The following year she again sang A Masked Ball with Caruso and Mario Sammarco as well as her other favourite page role, Urbain in Les Huguenots, opposite Emmy Destinn, Caruso, Scotti, Journet and Clarence Whitehill. She also appeared in Gounod's Roméo et Juliette opposite Charles Dalmorès' Romeo. She also repeated, in these two seasons of coloratura successes, her Elisabeth in Tannhäuser, with Karel Burian in the title role.

In 1907 she was heard again at Covent Garden, this time in Lucia di Lammermoor, with Alessandro Bonci as Edgardo. She repeated Rigoletto (with Bonci and Sammarco) and Un ballo in maschera (with Amedeo Bassi) and added Catalani's Loreley, obviously a Bassi vehicle. She was then not heard at the Royal Opera until 1924, when she sang La bohème and La traviata. Her London appearances were extremely successful, notwithstanding the enmity of the all-powerful Nellie Melba, as entrenched at Covent Garden as Kurz was in Vienna.

Selma Kurz was many times invited to appear in the United States and received several tempting offers from the Metropolitan Opera in New York. None of these managed to induce her so far from Vienna and her family. It was only in 1921 that she finally sailed for the New World, appearing one single time in concert at the New York Hippodrome. This was supposed to be the first concert of a long tour, but she immediately took ill (she had possibly had a heart attack) and the tour was cancelled. She immediately returned to Vienna, where she had a long convalescence before she could return to performing with a voice that, all agreed, was never quite the same.

== Last years ==
In 1910, Selma Kurz married the gynecologist, Joseph Halban (1876–1937), a professor at Vienna University, who later was knighted by the Austrian Emperor, becoming Ritter Joseph von Halban. With him she had two children, Désirée (1912–1996) and Georg (1915–1998). "Dési" Halban became a concert soprano who, among other things, recorded Mahler's Fourth Symphony with Bruno Walter. She married Dutch art dealer Jacques Goudstikker in 1937. Georg became a writer. Notwithstanding her always delicate health, Selma von Halban-Kurz had a notably happy family life in her palatial Vienna home until, in 1929, she became ill with cancer. After a battle with this disease, she died on 10 May 1933 in Vienna.

It was the municipal authorities that insisted that the great Imperial and Royal Kammersängerin be buried at the Zentralfriedhof, the Central Cemetery where Vienna's great sons and daughters are interred. There she lies, not far from Mozart, Beethoven, Schubert and Brahms.

== Appreciation ==
Selma Kurz was a very beautiful woman, 1.6 m, fragile and delicate. Her appearance on stage and acting was attractive and very well received. She could make the public go mad with her long trills. People even came with stopwatches to determine that it was 'even one second longer than yesterday'. In a 1907 recording of Taubert's Der Vogel im Walde, the trill lasts 24 seconds.

"Selma Kurz is one of the greatest coloratura sopranos of all times. Her effortless mastering of difficult parts, the freedom of her taste of style, but above all her endless uncomparable trills can't be overestimated and she can still be admired on CD".

== Recordings ==
Selma Kurz left over 150 78-rpm recordings. The first were made for Emile Berliner in 1900. These were followed by Zonophone and Gramophone & Typewriter Company discs, dating from 1901 to 1906. She then made a long series for His Master's Voice in 1907–1914. These are by far the best of her recordings, capturing the attractiveness of her tone and the exceptional agility of her vocal technique. Around 1910, she recorded three cylinders for the Edison company. After the First World War, she recorded for Deutsche Grammophon/Polydor in 1923–24. This is a successful series of records, even though it documents a decline in the voice. In 1924–25 she again recorded for His Master's Voice, which even made a number of electrical recordings of her singing, including a remarkable version of the "Siren Call" from The Queen of Sheba, complete with her trademark trill.

She recorded a number of pieces accompanied by the Czech violinist Váša Příhoda.

== Bibliography ==
- Halban, Dési: Selma Kurz, die Sängerin und ihre Zeit, Stuttgart & Zürich, Belser Verlag 1983, ISBN 3-7630-9028-2
- Halban, Dési: Notes to compact discs Pearl GEMM 9171 (London, 1995) and Club "99" 43 (New York, 1989), which include many personal reminiscences from Kurz's own daughter
- Semrau, Laura: Notes to compact disc Preiser Lebendige Vergangenheit, 89504 (Vienna, 2000)
- Karl-Josef Kutsch and Leo Riemens, editors: Großes Sängerlexikon, Basel, Saur, 2000
- Karl-Josef Kutsch and Leo Riemens: Unvergängliche Stimmen, Sängerlexikon, Bern, Francke Verlag 1975, ISBN 3-7720-1145-4
