= Dési von Halban =

Austrian opera singer (1912–1996)

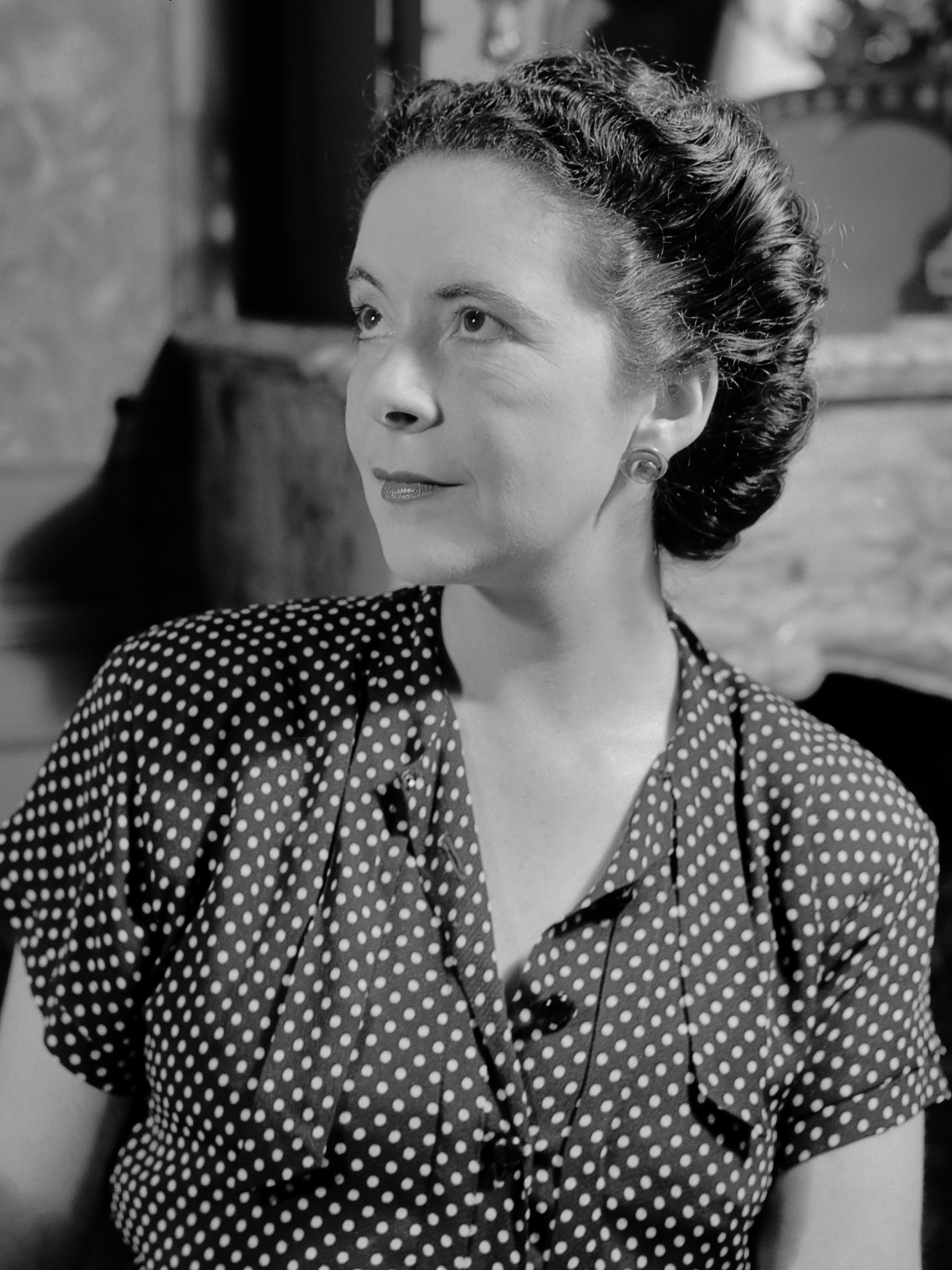
- Dési von Halban in 1946
- Born: Désirée Louise Anna Ernestine von Halban; 10 April 1912; Vienna, Austria-Hungary
- Died: 12 February 1996 (aged 83); Bilthoven, Netherlands
- Occupations: Opera and concert singer
- Spouses: Jacques Goudstikker (m. 1937; died 1940) August von Saher (m. 1950)
- Children: Edouard von Saher (b. 1939)
- Parent(s): Josef von Halban and Selma Kurz

Désirée Louise Anna Ernestine "Dési" von Halban (10 April 1912 – 12 February 1996) was an Austrian opera and concert singer. She was the daughter of Austrian parents: operatic soprano Selma Kurz and gynecologist Josef von Halban.

== Life ==
Dési von Halban was married to Dutch art dealer Jacques Goudstikker who fled the Nazis in 1940, but died on board the SS Bodegraven while passing the English Channel. His wife and infant son, Edouard, made their way to New York City, via Montreal. His art collection was looted by the Nazis, and a group of 202 paintings was restituted in 2006, a decade after her death, only after a lengthy legal dispute.

Halban remarried in 1950, to twice-divorced Dutch lawyer August von Saher. Her son adopted his stepfather's surname. He married Marei Langenbein, a West German figure skater. Their daughter, Charlene von Saher, became a competitive figure skater.

Physicist Hans von Halban was Dési's second cousin.
