= Alois Miedl =

German-born Dutch Nazi banker and art dealer

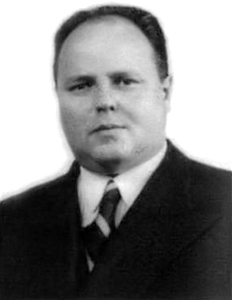
Miedl, c. 1940

Alois Miedl (3 March 1903 – 11 June 1970) was a naturalized Dutch art dealer, originally a German Nazi banker, born in Munich, who had moved to and was mainly active in the Netherlands, involved with the sales of properties stolen from Jews who had fled or had been deported.

== Early life ==
Alois Miedl was born in 1903 in Munich as son to Alois Miedl and Maria Streicher. His father owned a dairy farm. Alois Miedl married Theodore "Dorie" Fleischer, a Jewish girl with whom he had two children, Ruth Marie (born 1925) and Hanns Alois (born 1933). From 1920 to 1924, Alois worked at the bank of Heinrich and Hugo Marx in Munich, and from 1924 to 1929 at the bank Witzig & Co., also in Munich. In 1930 he became a director of the Berlin Schantung-Handelaktiengeselschaft, and in 1932 he moved to the Netherlands as director of Veland, a subsidiary of the Berlin company. At the same time, he was director of a number of companies in Germany and elsewhere. He was an avid mountaineer. He moved to the Netherlands in 1932, because of his new function there, but probably also because he feared for the security of his Jewish wife in Germany.

== Nazi connections ==
Before the war, the Miedls frequented the richest Jewish families in Amsterdam, where they had moved to from Munich in 1932. At the same time, he was a friend of many prominent Nazi leaders, including Hermann Göring and Ferdinand aus der Fünten, the head of the Central Office for Jewish Emigration in Amsterdam. He even stayed several times at Hitler's residence Berghof in Berchtesgaden. After the occupation of the Netherlands had started, Dorie was declared an Honorary Aryan. The Miedls organized galas in their home to celebrate Hitler's birthday, with Miedl wearing an SS-uniform and prominent members of the Dutch Gestapo as guests.

== Second World War ==
Right from the start of the war, Miedl tried to acquire art works from Jewish owners, threatening them that they had the choice between selling to him at severely reduced prices, or being looted by the Gestapo. Many Jews, not seeing any way out, agreed to the blackmail. Miedl not only dealt in art, but also got his hands on other valuables in this way. He also offered protection to some Jews as a form of business transaction, thereby saving about a dozen Jews from deportation and near-certain death. But in other cases, he had no qualms about letting Jewish associates being deported. For example, his two Jewish accountants were transferred to Theresienstadt in 1943 and died there.

After famous collector Jacques Goudstikker had died when fleeing the Netherlands, Miedl bought his collection of 1300 old master paintings and other artworks illegally, and sold 600 of the paintings to Hermann Göring. Alois Miedl acquired for himself the Goudstikker estate Oostermeer in Ouderkerk a/d Amstel, where he would live in splendour, and the gallery including Nijenrode Castle. All of it was bought for 2 million guilders, which was only a fraction of the actual value at the time. Among the pictures sold to Göring were Two Philosophers by Rembrandt and works by Salomon van Ruysdael, Hans Memling, Lucas Cranach the Elder, Gerard ter Borch, Jacopo del Casentino and Frans Hals. The works kept by Miedl included Rembrandt's Young man with a sword, which he sold in 1944 in Germany to pay off a loan.

He used the Goudstikker name and fame to do business. In return he protected the Jewish mother of Goudstikker, who had not fled the Netherlands with the rest of the family and now faced the same risks as all Jews in Nazi-occupied Europe. Thanks to the deal, she survived the war and acquired the company again afterwards. According to former Dutch resistance member Joseph Piller, who was instructed by the Dutch Army immediately after the war to research the role of the Goudstikker gallery during the war, Miedl used the company as a front to sell looted art to Nazis, and used the profits for the Abwehr.

From the collection of the Wolf brothers, who had fled the Netherlands, he bought multiple paintings for the Göring collection, including a Vincent van Gogh, a Tintoretto, and a Joos van Cleve. For his own, he acquired the bank and the cinema previously owned by the brothers. From Hans Tietje, who was married to a Jewish wife, he bought a Madonna and Child by Lucas Cranach the Elder. From the Jew Fritz Gutmann, he bought three sixteenth-century silver cups. Other collections he bought include the Proehl collection (which included a Venus by Cranach) and he made an attempt at buying the Mannheimer collection which slipped away and was bought by Muhlmann for the Linz collection.

Another Jewish art collector who dealt with Miedl was Nathan Katz. His heirs claimed that the artworks were sold under duress, similar to that of many other clients of Miedl, but this was disputed by the Dutch government, which had recovered many of the paintings from the Nazis after the war. Katz and Miedl had been friends, and no sufficient evidence could be produced to show that the sale had not been voluntary.

Miedl also dealt with non-Jewish collectors. He bought a collection of 19 old master paintings from German banker Franz Koenigs in 1941: 9 Rubens paintings from it were sold by Miedl to Göring. from the Belgian art collector Émile Renders, he bought 12 old Flemish works, including works attributed to Hans Memling and to Rogier van der Weyden. 6 Works were sold to Göring, the other half was kept by Miedl.

In 1942, Miedl bought Christ with the Adulteress, a painting supposedly by Johannes Vermeer but actually a forgery by Han van Meegeren, for 1.65 million Dutch guilders. He then sold it to Hermann Göring in exchange for an undisclosed sum of money and 150 other looted paintings, 54 of them originally from the Goudstikker collection, totalling about 2 million guilders worth.

Miedl was also involved in other business and speculation. His most ambitious plan was to buy, according to the source, either the coast of Labrador or Anticosti Island, or both to have a constant supply of wood for Germany, or alternatively as a foothold to spy on Canada or the United States. It failed when Canada disallowed the sale for fear of espionage. He also was said to have attempted to buy a gold mine in the Dutch East Indies, and was reputedly involved with diamond smuggling.

In July 1944, Miedl fled to Francoist Spain via Switzerland. He had in February 1944 sent most of his art collection to the country, together with his wife who he felt was no longer safe in the Netherlands despite Göring's protection. It has also been speculated, based on claims made by SS officer Otto Ohlendorf, that he transferred part of Göring's collection to Spain as well, as a safeguard against the fall of the Third Reich. Twenty two paintings he had smuggled out of the Netherlands, including thirteen paintings of the Goudstikker collection, were confiscated in the port of Bilbao. Although they were reclaimed by the Netherlands, it is unclear what happened to them. Miedl remained in Spain and negotiated a deal with the Dutch authorities, who confiscated valuables worth about 1.8 million guilders, and some 150 pictures left by Miedl in the Netherlands when he fled. Other paintings acquired by Miedl were kept in banks in Berlin, and in Switzerland. The works in Switzerland, which included 4 paintings by Paul Cézanne and Van Gogh's Self portrait with bandaged ear, all previously owned by French art dealer and Jew Paul Rosenberg, were confiscated in 1945. The works in Germany were also recovered and claimed by the Dutch government.

No further trial or repayments were asked, meaning that Miedl was free to keep the rest of his amassed wealth and continue to do business throughout the world. He was estimated to have smuggled some 200 paintings to Spain that were never recovered. He tried to sell a Goya to the Prado. He planned an auction of the others, and had prepared a catalogue, listing works by Cranach, Rubens, Van Gogh, Rembrandt, Anthony van Dyck, Cézanne, Titian and El Greco. He sold a painting he had bought during the war from Émile Renders, a copy of a wing of the Braque Triptych by Rogier van der Weyden, perhaps made by Hans Memling, to a private collector in Norway in 1966. He died in Munich on June 11, 1970.
