= Jacopo del Casentino =

Italian painter

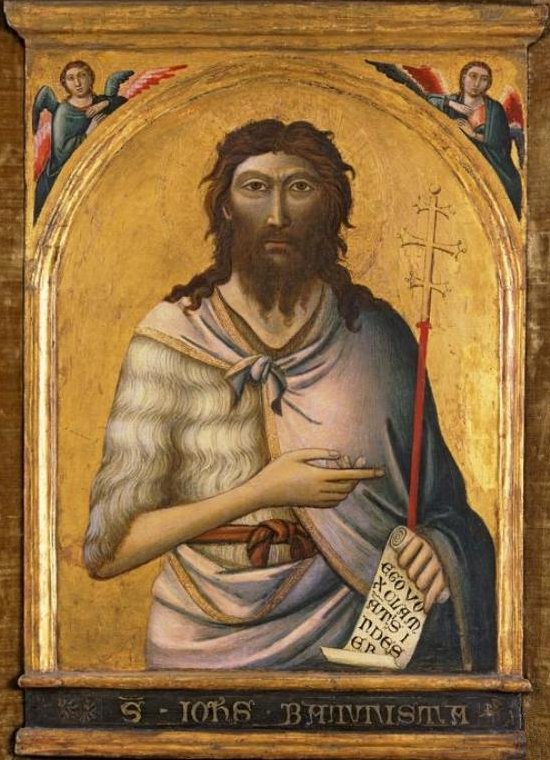
St. John the Baptist

Jacopo del Casentino (c. 1297 – 1358) was an Italian painter, active mainly in Tuscany in the first half of the 14th century.

== Life ==
Very little is known about this artist other than that he likely came from Casentino. Giorgio Vasari incorrectly identified him as a member of the Landini family and that is the reason why in the past he was referred to as Jacopo Landino. Vasari also incorrectly placed his origins in Arezzo.

It is likely he received his training in Florence in the milieu of the Master of St Cecilia. His career appears to have been confined to the first half of the 14th century. He was one of the founders of the Compagnia di S Luca (Company of Painters), which was under the patronage of the Virgin and Saints John the Baptist, Saint Zenobius, Saint Reparata, and Saint Luke and was elected in 1339 its first consigliere.

== Work ==
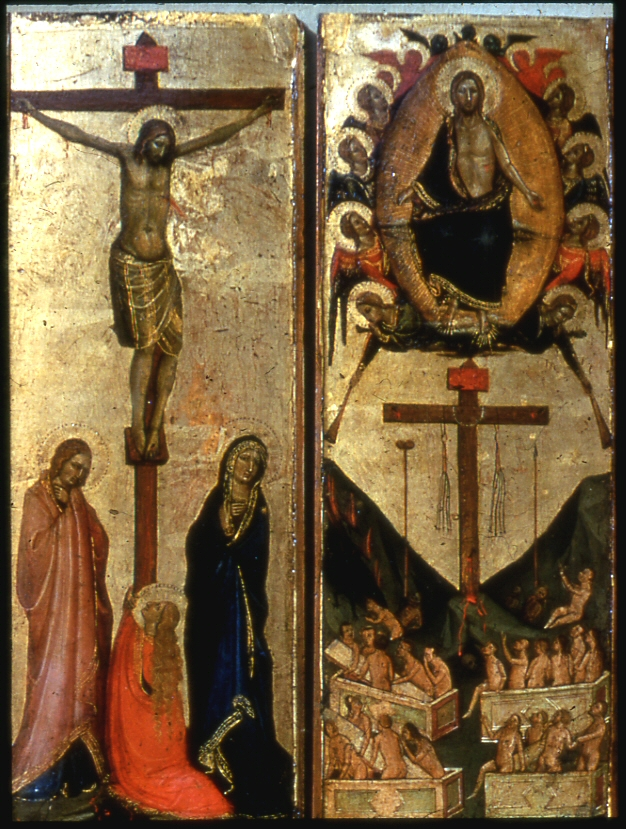
The Last Judgment and the Crucifixion

Casentino specialized in small devotional altars commissioned for private worship. Casentino popularized these altars throughout Italy along with artists such as Bernardo Daddi (1280 – 1348) . His work shows the influence of Giotto (1267 – 1337), with whom Daddi apprenticed. Casentino may have spent time in Giotto's workshop and have been a pupil of another Giotto follower, Taddeo Gaddi (1300 – 1366).

Casentino also showed an influence from the Sienese School of painting. The later Gothic style Casentino painted in was also influenced by the Sienese painters Pietro Lorenzetti (1280 – 1348) and his brother Ambrogio (1290 – 1348).
