= Gouden Bocht =

Coordinates: 52°21′56″N 4°53′26″E

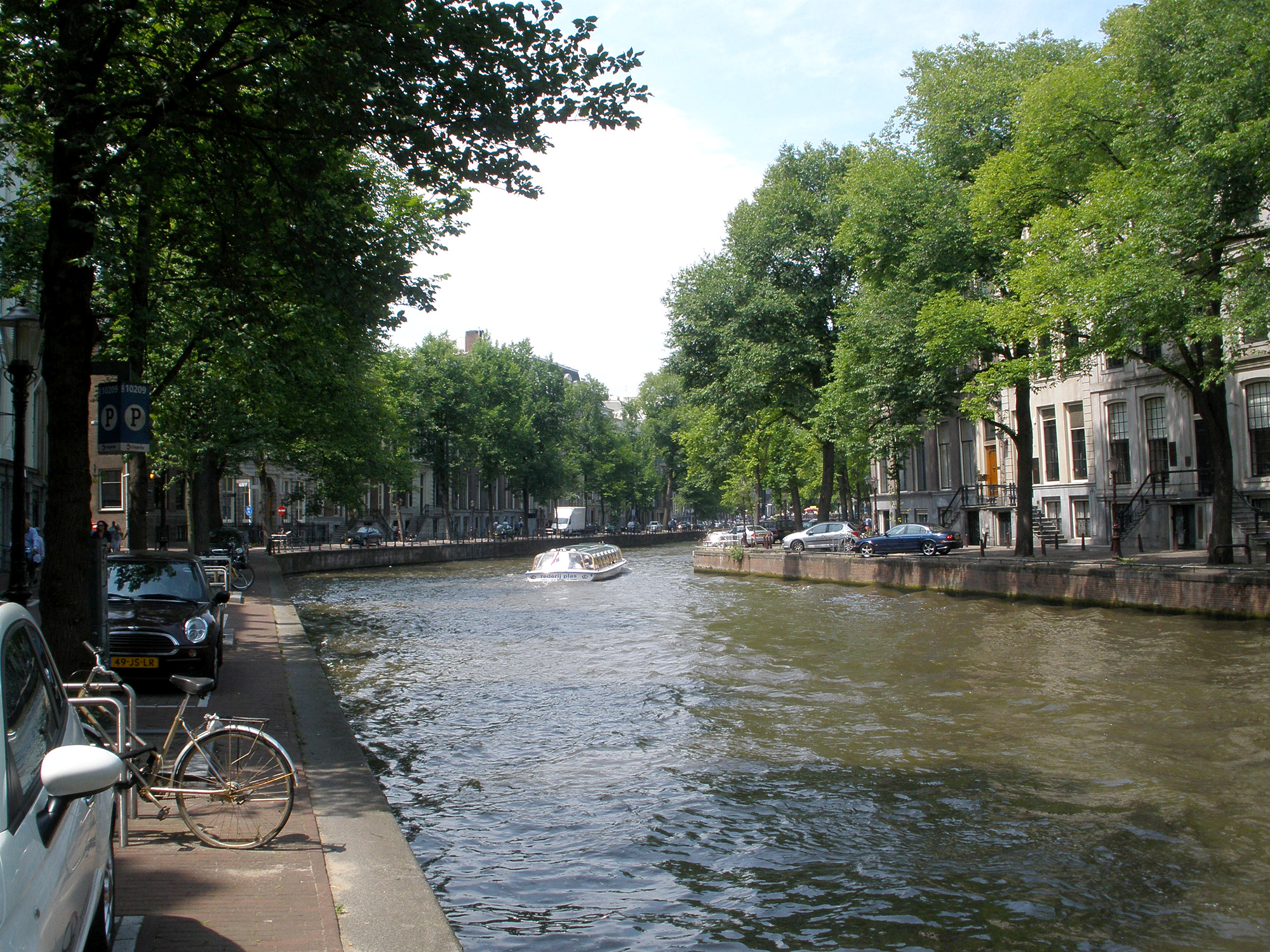
The Gouden Bocht, 2008

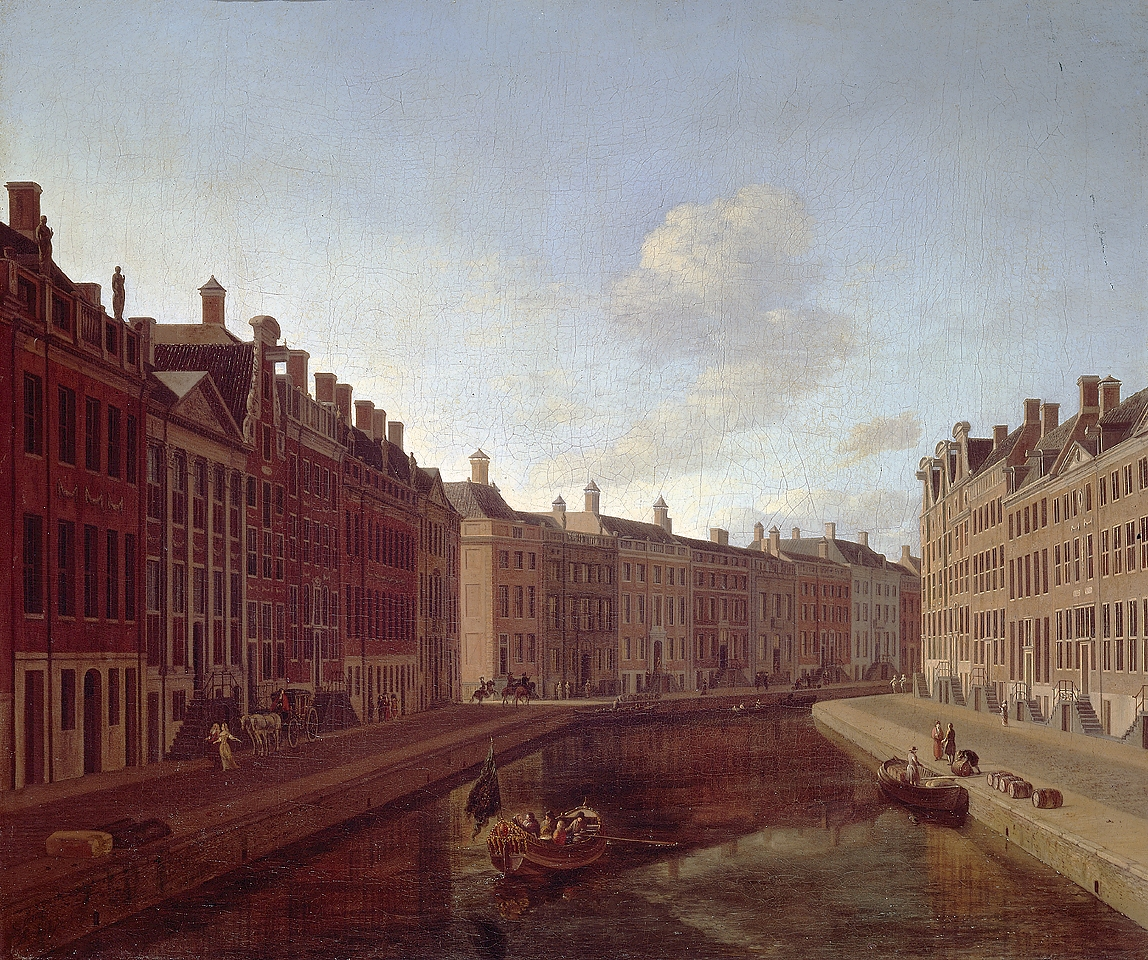
The bend of the Herengracht in Amsterdam, 1685, Gerrit Adriaenszoon Berckheyde

The Gouden Bocht (English: "Golden Bend") is the most prestigious part of the Herengracht in Amsterdam, Netherlands, between Leidsestraat and Vijzelstraat.

Until 1663 the Herengracht reached as far as the present Leidsegracht. From that year on, the fortifications around Amsterdam were expanded, within the Herengracht, the Keizersgracht and the Prinsengracht which were expanded. The digging ended at the river Amstel within a few years. The buyers on the Herengracht were encouraged to buy two lots and built double-wide mansions, and because the three canals here were laid out a little further from each other, and the lots were also deeper. On these large lots, the well-to-do placed their city-palaces with classicist facades, stuccoed ceilings, and fine gardens, once a year open to the public. In the curve, by the Nieuwe Spiegelstraat, lived Amsterdam's richest citizens, and so this part of the belt of canals was named the "Golden Bend" in recent history.

At number 446 is the Huis van der Graeff built by burgomaster Andries de Graeff in 1672. In 2008, the two fashion designers Viktor Horsting and Rolf Snoeren, who trade as Viktor & Rolf, bought the house. The house of the family De Neufville (1731), located at Herengracht 475 and 476, is known as having the prettiest facades. Herengracht 466, on the corner of the Nieuwe Spiegelstraat was designed by Philip Vingboons and from 1858 until 1926 the office of the Dutch Trade-Society. On the other corner (Herengracht 464) was the office of former lawyer Bram Moszkowicz. The Golden Bend is now mainly made up of banks and other financial institutions, some cultural institutions, like Goethe Institute, as well as a small private-museum, the Kattenkabinet (Herengracht 497).

== Literature ==
- Hans Tulleners De Gouden Bocht; 21 monumenten aan de Amsterdamse Herengracht (1989)
- Stichting ITARR/ARRS 'De Gouden Bocht van Amsterdam' ISBN 90-810694-1-1 (2006)
- Urban Home & Garden Tours, architectuur rondleidingen met bezoek aan interieurs en tuinen Gouden Bocht Amsterdam
