= 2006 Goudstikker restitution of 202 paintings =

Art repatriation agreement

The 2006 Goudstikker restitution of 202 paintings is a binding decision by the Dutch Ministry of Culture on a WWII restitution case between the heirs of Jacques Goudstikker and the agency in charge of the Dutch National art collection (called Instituut Collectie Nederland). The 202 paintings are just a fraction of the property once owned by Goudstikker that was seized during the German occupation in 1940. After post-war discovery in Germany of much of the collection, it was returned to the Dutch State by the Monuments Men but despite repeated attempts by Goudstikker's widow, never given back to the heirs. To finance further recovery activities through provenance research, much of the 2006 group of paintings have since been sold by the Goudstikker heirs, and a few were bought back by the Dutch State. See Jacques Goudstikker for more information about his collection.

nr.	image	NK nr.	maker (per ICN)	Dutch title (per ICN, with link to ICN info)	Black book nr.	collection in 2006
1		NK1413	A. van Dyck	Portret van een man	1979	non-museum institution
2		NK1418	Omgeving van A. Bronzino	Portret van een vrouw	2776	Bonnefanten museum
3		NK1419	Anoniem	Steniging van de ouderlingen	1948	depot ICN
4		NK1421	Atelier van L. Cranach	Venus en Amor	2071	Bonnefanten museum
5		NK1422	I. van Ostade	Interieur van een schuur met een man en twee kinderen	2189	depot ICN
6		NK1423	Jacopo dal Casentino	Heilige Lucia	2599	Bonnefanten museum
7		NK1425	J. Jansz. de Stomme	Portret van een jong meisje	2079	non-museum institution
8		NK1429	Anoniem	Portret van een man met een luit	2133	Bonnefanten museum
9		NK1430	F. Lippi	Madonna in aanbidding voor Christus	2604	Bonnefanten museum
10		NK1431	C. Lorrain	Landschap met de roof van Europa door Jupiter	2563	Museum Boijmans Van Beuningen
11		NK1433	Onzekere toeschrijving A. Cuyp	Vissers bij maanlicht	2272	depot ICN
12		NK1438	M. van Wittenbroeck	Landschap met saters, nimfen en vee	744	MuseagoudA
13		NK1439	T. de Keyser	Portret van een jongen	1466	depot ICN
14		NK1440	Navolger van A. Magnasco	Kattenmuziek	2156	depot ICN
15		NK1442	Anoniem	Tuinpoort	1668	non-museum institution
16		NK1443	Omgeving van F.A. Vincent	Hoofd van oude man met baard	1278	depot ICN
17		NK1444	H.S. von Kulmbach	Maria Cleophas, Cleophas en hun vier kinderen	2138	Mauritshuis
18		NK1446	H.S. von Kulmbach	Maria Salome en haar familie	2137	Mauritshuis
19		NK1448	Navolger van W. van de Velde II	Schepen in kalm water voor de kust	2018	non-museum institution
20		NK1449	W. de Poorter	De schending van een graf	416	depot ICN
21		NK1450	D. Teniers II	Een nachtelijk bezoek	2423	depot ICN
22		NK1452	Navolger van P. Veronese	Kop van een negerjongen	2840	depot ICN
23		NK1458	A. Romano	Madonna met kind, Catharina van Alexandrië en Johannes de Doper	2694	Bonnefanten museum
24		NK1459	Kopie naar G.B. Pittoni	De heilige Elisabeth van Thuringia deelt aalmoezen uit	1862	non-museum institution
25		NK1460	Navolger van J. Cornelisz. van Oostsanen	De geschiedenis van Jacob en Ezau	2502	depot ICN
26		NK1465	Anoniem	Portret van een vrouw, mogelijk Diane de Poitiers (1499-1566)	2489	Bonnefanten museum
27		NK1472	Atelier van Neri di Bicci	De aartsengel Rafael begeleidt twee Dominicanen op hun reis - deel van een predella	2669	Bonnefanten museum
28		NK1473	A. Romano	Madonna met kind	2160	Bonnefanten museum
29		NK1476	I. Luttichuys	Esther de Bary (1630-1696). Echtgenote van Jan Hendrik Levestenon	928	non-museum institution
30		NK1478	C. van der Voort	Jonkheer Adriaen de Kies van Wissen (1582-1664)	1566	depot ICN
31		NK1480	C. van der Voort	Justina van Teylingen (1596-1643). Echtgenote van Jonkheer Adriaen de Kies van Wissen	1567	depot ICN
32		NK1481	J.J. van Goyen	Rivierlandschap met dorp	2745	non-museum institution
33		NK1482	J.A. van Ravesteyn	Portret van een man	2196	non-museum institution
34		NK1483	Anoniem	Portret van een kardinaal	2645	depot ICN
35		NK1484	Onzekere toeschrijving C. Engelsz	Keukenstuk	1688	Gemeente Musea Delft, Stedelijk Museum Het Prinsenhof
36		NK1485	Giovanni da Rimini	Christus aan het kruis	2212	Bonnefanten museum
37		NK1486	J.A. van Ravesteyn	Portret van een vrouw	2197	non-museum institution
38		NK1491	H. van Steenwijck II	De bevrijding van de heilige Petrus uit de gevangenis	508	Bonnefanten museum
39		NK1492	G. Houckgeest	Interieur van een gothische kerk	322 / 117	depot ICN
40		NK1493	J. van Winghe	Stilleven met glasstander, schaal en kreeftjes	1044	Gemeente Musea Delft, Stedelijk Museum Het Prinsenhof
41		NK1494	T. de Keyser	Een Nederlandse patriarch als Mozes met drie leden van zijn gezin?, waarbij een engel hem het Beloofde Land toont	2024	Museum Catharijneconvent
42		NK1495	P. van Overschie	Stilleven met kreeft en watermeloen	1435	depot ICN
43		NK1497	E. de Witte	Interieur van een protestantse Gothische kerk	1288	Gemeente Musea Delft, Stedelijk Museum Het Prinsenhof
44		NK1512	D. van Delen	Architectuurfantasie met figuren	433	Noordbrabants Museum
45		NK1519	S.J. van Ruysdael	Veerboot met koeien op de Vecht bij Nijenrode	2772	Stedelijk Museum De Lakenhal
46		NK1520	P. de Molijn	Duinlandschap met boerenwoning	2015	depot ICN
47		NK1522	Meester van de Münchener Aanbidding	Maria geeft het Christuskind de borst	522	Bonnefanten museum
48		NK1523	E. de Witte	Vertumnus en Pomona	1432	depot ICN
49		NK1524	S.J. van Ruysdael	Vesting aan een rivier	2590	depot ICN
50		NK1525	I. van Ostade	Interieur van een schuur met man en vrouw bij het vuur	2497	non-museum institution
51		NK1527	Pasqualino Veneziano	Madonna met kind	2542	Bonnefanten museum
52		NK1528	Ph. Wouwerman	Landschap met beekje en houten brug	1102/ 627	depot ICN
53		NK1575	Ch. Le Brun	Allegorische voorstelling - vrouwenfiguur met twee gevleugelde putti	1074	Rijksmuseum Amsterdam
54		NK1581	A. Palamedesz.	Een muziekfeest	372	depot ICN
55		NK1636	G.P. van Zijl	Familieportret	2684	depot ICN
56		NK1643	Atelier van P.P. Rubens	Pilatus wast zijn handen 'in onschuld'?	2924 A	depot ICN
57		NK1696	P. Dubordieu	Portret van Anna van den Bogaerde, geboren 1606/1607	2505	depot ICN
58		NK1730	Navolger van A. van Ostade	Een smidse	2095	depot ICN
59		NK1737	D. Teniers II	Een alchemist	2088	depot ICN
60		NK1754	Navolger van P. Veronese	Portret van een man	1933	non-museum institution
61		NK1827	M. di Campidoglio	Stilleven met meloen, kalebas, appels en perziken	2774 A	depot ICN
62		NK1833	In de stijl van M.A.A.C. Kauffmann	Portret van een vrouw	2580	non-museum institution
63		NK1846	F. Pacher	De heilige Florian van Lorch - linkervleugel van een altaarstuk (binnenzijde)	3025	Stedelijk Museum Zutphen
64		NK1849	Navolger van G. Bellini	Madonna met kind	B.I.	Bonnefanten museum
65		NK1850	Navolger van P. Brueghel I	Landschap, de maand juli symboliserend	2631 / 467H	Noordbrabants Museum
66		NK1851	Navolger van P. Brueghel I	Landschap, de maand augustus symboliserend	2631 / 4673	Noordbrabants Museum
67		NK1852	Navolger van P. Brueghel I	Landschap, de maand september symboliserend	2631 / 467F	Noordbrabants Museum
68		NK1853	Navolger van P. Brueghel I	Landschap, de maand juni symboliserend	2631 / 467E	Noordbrabants Museum
69		NK1854	Navolger van P. Brueghel I	Landschap, de maand oktober symboliserend	2631 / 467I	Noordbrabants Museum
70		NK1855	Navolger van P. Brueghel I	Landschap, de maand april symboliserend	2631 / 467D	Noordbrabants Museum
71		NK1859	F. Pacher	Maria Magdalena - rechtervleugel van een altaarstuk (binnenzijde)	3026	Stedelijk Museum Zutphen
72		NK1860	F. Pacher	Een heilige bisschop - rechtervleugel van een altaarstuk (buitenzijde)	3024	Stedelijk Museum Zutphen
73		NK1871	J.H. Koekkoek	Schepen op stormachtige zee bij Middelburg	2115	non-museum institution
74		NK1876	G.G. Joncherie	Opgezette vogels	1860	Rijksmuseum Amsterdam
75		NK1884	Navolger van P. Brueghel I	Landschap, de maand januari symboliserend	2631 / 467	Noordbrabants Museum
76		NK1885	Navolger van P. Brueghel I	Landschap, de maand maart symboliserend	2631 / 467	Noordbrabants Museum
77		NK1888	Navolger van P. Brueghel I	Landschap, de maand februari symboliserend	2631 / 467	Noordbrabants Museum
78		NK1889	Navolger van P. Brueghel I	Landschap, de maand mei symboliserend	2631 / 467	Noordbrabants Museum
79		NK1897	D. Teniers II	Menagerie: wachtkamer met apen verkleed als soldaten	3055	Mauritshuis
80		NK1898	J.J. van Goyen	Winterlandschap met schaatsers en herberg	2424	Rijksmuseum Twenthe
81		NK1899	J.H. Steen	Hanengevecht in een taveerne	853	Limburgs Museum
82		NK1901	J.B. Leprince	Vrouw in het rood	2402	Bonnefanten museum
83		NK1906	F. Pourbus I	Portret van een man	1446	depot ICN
84		NK1916	Navolger van F. Boucher	Oordeel van Paris	2183	non-museum institution
85		NK1920	F. Pacher	De heilige Andreas - linkervleugel van een altaarstuk (buitenzijde)	3023	Stedelijk Museum Zutphen
86		NK1924	Navolger van F. Squarcione	Madonna met kind	792	Bonnefanten museum
87		NK1976	J. Provoost	De engel van de Annunciatie - vleugel van een altaarstuk (buitenzijde)	2344	Bonnefanten museum
88		NK2009	M. van Heemskerck	Portret van een man	1756	Gemeente Musea Delft, Stedelijk Museum Het Prinsenhof
89		NK2074	L. Defrance	Stilleven met vruchten, brood, flessen en glas	2727	Bonnefanten museum
90		NK2078	P. Longhi	De fritole-verkoper	1469	non-museum institution
91		NK2092	B.J. Butinone	De profeet Jesaias	2001	Bonnefanten museum
92		NK2093	B.J. Butinone	Kerkvader	2000	Bonnefanten museum
93		NK2094	B.J. Butinone	Kerkvader	1999	Bonnefanten museum
94		NK2122	H.G. Pot	De kroning van Maria de' Medici (1573-1642) in Parijs, 13 mei 1610	747	non-museum institution
95		NK2168	A. van Ostade	Een pijprokende man	1878	depot ICN
96		NK2192	J.H. Steen	Een boerenbruiloft	1879	Limburgs Museum
97		NK2193	G.C. de Hondecoeter	Koeien en schapen in een landschap	1808	Centraal Museum Utrecht
98		NK2203	C. Kruys	Stilleven met taart en vergulde bokaal	523	Gemeente Musea Delft, Stedelijk Museum Het Prinsenhof
99		NK2234	J.S. Mancadan	Landschap met ruïne bij beek, herders en vee	2117	non-museum institution
100		NK2242	In de stijl van L. Cranach	Judith met het hoofd van Holofernes	2017	Bonnefanten museum
101		NK2263	E. de Witte	De heilige familie	1705	Gemeente Musea Delft, Stedelijk Museum Het Prinsenhof
102		NK2301	Navolger van F. Hals	Portret van een man	641-644-1200	depot ICN
103		NK2304	A. van Dyck	Studie van een apostel	2550	Bonnefanten museum
104		NK2331	J. van der Heyden	(geb. 1637) Zijaanzicht op het kasteel Nijenrode	2872	Rijksmuseum Amsterdam
105		NK2347	S.J. van Ruysdael	Rivierlandschap met gezicht op Herwen en Aerdt in Gelderland	2635	Rijksmuseum Amsterdam
106		NK2349	J.H. Steen	De offering van Iphigeneia	1972	Rijksmuseum Amsterdam
107		NK2350	G. ter Borch	Cosimo III dei Medici in harnas	1946	Rijksmuseum Amsterdam
108		NK2357	Meester van de slag bij Anghiari	Triomf van Aemilius Paulus	2331	Rijksmuseum Amsterdam
109		NK2361	Meester van de Virgo Inter Virgines	De opstanding	2557	Rijksmuseum Amsterdam
110		NK2376	C. Schuch	Boomstammen aan de rand van een bos	2232	Van Gogh Museum
111		NK2377	D.A. Vallayer-Coster	Stilleven met fles, kandelaar, koffiekan en twee koppen	1338	Rijksmuseum Amsterdam
112		NK2397	A. Benson	Zelfportret [? als de H. Lucas]	2458	Noordbrabants Museum
113		NK2402	J. van Kessel I	Stilleven met vruchten	2404	non-museum institution
114		NK2405	H.G. Pot	Portret van een man	2193	non-museum institution
115		NK2406	H.G. Pot	Portret van een vrouw	2194	non-museum institution
116		NK2412	J. van Streek	Stilleven met mispel op een schaal en andere objecten	2685	depot ICN
117		NK2428	Onzekere toeschrijving P. de Hooch	De waarzegger	1693	non-museum institution
118		NK2432	G. ter Borch	Interieur van een zolderkamer	2360	non-museum institution
119		NK2440	J.J. van Goyen	Gezicht op de Oude Maas te Dordrecht	2638	Dordrechts Museum
120		NK2448	J.C. Verspronck	Jean le Gouche (1588-1669)	1712	Frans Halsmuseum
121		NK2455	J.I. van Ruisdael	Rotslandschap met waterval	2569	depot ICN
122		NK2457	F. van Schooten	Stilleven met kazen, kandelaar en rookgerei	2596	Gemeente Musea Delft, Stedelijk Museum Het Prinsenhof
123		NK2461	Atelier van L. Cranach	Barbara, hertogin van Saksen (gest. 1581). Echtgenote van Georg der Bärtige, hertog van	3075	Rijksmuseum Twenthe
124		NK2469	W.C. Duyster	Jongen met pijp en beker	446	MuseagoudA
125		NK2470	J.J. van Goyen	Vestingwallen en windmolen langs rivier	2947	MuseagoudA
126		NK2471	J. van Kessel	Winterlandschap met takkenbos dragende man	1475	MuseagoudA
127		NK2480	S.J. de Vlieger	De ingang van een haven	2119	MuseagoudA
128		NK2492	P. Koninck	Landschap met bomen en landhuisje	617	depot ICN
129		NK2495	J. Cornelisz. van Oostsanen	De brillenverkoopster	2852	Museum Catharijneconvent
130		NK2505	G.A. Berckheyde	De Plaats in Den Haag	2195	non-museum institution
131		NK2522	B. Graat	Familieportret in landschap	512	depot ICN
132		NK2536	Navolger van Canaletto	Gezicht op het Palazzo Ducale en de riva degli Schiavoni in Venetië	2916	non-museum institution
133		NK2539	J. Lingelbach	Italianiserend landschap met rivierdal, figuren en paarden	582	niet museale instelling
134		NK2545	J.A. van Ravesteyn	Portret van een officier	2323	non-museum institution
135		NK2546	S.J. van Ruysdael	Landschap met ruiters bij Amersfoort	1644	depot ICN
136		NK2551	L. Defrance	Interieur van een herberg	2396	Bonnefanten museum
137		NK2552	L. Defrance	Interieur van een herberg	2397	Bonnefanten museum
138		NK2557	J. Fyt	Stilleven met dode vogels	996	Mauritshuis
139		NK2573	I. van Ostade	Wintergezicht met een herberg bij een bevroren stroom	2566	Stedelijk Museum De Lakenhal
140		NK2592	Omgeving van S.J. van Ruysdael	Gezicht op de duinen bij Zandvoort	2440	non-museum institution
141		NK2602	J.S. Mancadan	Herders met geiten en koeien bij een ruïne	1831	Fries Museum
142		NK2605	J.S. Mancadan	Herders met geiten en koeien	723	Fries Museum
143		NK2606	J.S. Mancadan	Twee jagers in een roeiboot	2228	Fries Museum
144		NK2610	Anoniem	De heilige Agritia van Trier en de heilige Anno van Keulen	2092	Limburgs Museum
145		NK2618	H. met de Bles	Landschap met het wegzenden van Hagar	2655	Bonnefanten museum
146		NK2619	F. Bol	Maria Louise Gonzaga	426	depot ICN
147		NK2622	H. Galle I	Stilleven met bloemen in een vaas	2591	Noordbrabants Museum
148		NK2630	Meester van de Mansi-Magdalena	St. Maria Magdalena	2136	Bonnefanten museum
149		NK2639	Ph. Wouwerman	Winterlandschap met zandweg, boerderij en kerk	2256	depot ICN
150		NK2647	L. Gassel	Heuvelachtig landschap met dorp, werkende boeren en jachtgezelschap	1412	non-museum institution
151		NK2659	J. Wijnants	Boslandschap met boomstam, distel en figuren op een weg	234	Gemeente Musea Delft, Stedelijk Museum Het Prinsenhof
152		NK2692	B. van der Helst	Kind op sterfbed	1827	MuseagoudA
153		NK2703	Atelier van Neri di Bicci	De aartsengel Rafael redt een zelfmoordenaar - deel van een predella	2668	Bonnefanten museum
154		NK2704	B. Bruyn I	De heilige Bartholomeus	2431	Museum voor Religieuze Kunst
155		NK2705	B. Bruyn I	De heilige Barbara	2432	Museum voor Religieuze Kunst
156		NK2706	Meester van Frankfurt	St. Odilia en St. Cecilia	2145	Museum Catharijneconvent
157		NK2718	P.J. Moreelse	Anna Strick van Linschoten (1591-1637). Echtgenote van Philips Ram	2445	Centraal Museum Utrecht
158		NK2719	P.J. Moreelse	Philips Ram (1585-1632)	2444	Centraal Museum Utrecht
159		NK2721	Atelier van J. Cornelisz. Van Oostsanen	Drieluik: laatste avondmaal (midden); heiligen en opdrachtgevers (zijpanelen)	1503	Centraal Museum Utrecht
160		NK2723	B. van Orley	Inwijding Maria in de tempel met Joachim en Anna	2191	Bonnefanten museum
161		NK2726	J.H. Steen	Het gebed van Tobias en Sarah	2549	Museum Bredius
162		NK2829	I. Luttichuys	Jan Hendrik Lestevenon (1625-1703)	927	depot ICN
163		NK2831	J.J. van Goyen	Onweer boven een meer	BI	Stedelijk Museum De Lakenhal
164		NK2834	P.P. Lastman	David geeft Uriah een brief bestemd voor Joab	646	Mauritshuis
165		NK2840	H. Wertinger	Portret van een man	2778	Bonnefanten museum
166		NK2851	W. van Mieris	Een herderin	2428	depot ICN
167		NK2859	Kopie naar G. ter Borch	Portret van een dame	717	depot ICN
168		NK2860	Navolger van G. ter Borch	Portret van een man, wellicht Sybrand Schellinger (voor 1640-1686)	718	depot ICN
169		NK2868	Navolger van L. Bassano	Portret van een onbekende man	2158	depot ICN
170		NK2881	P.G. van Roestraeten	Stilleven met pul	2593	Rijksmuseum Amsterdam
171		NK2927	D. Vosmaer	Gezicht op Delft	1227	Gemeente Musea Delft, Stedelijk Museum Het Prinsenhof
172		NK3068	J.J. van Goyen	Kagermeer	2367	depot ICN
173		NK3083	Onzekere toeschrijving G. Metsu	Een koekenbakster	2116	depot ICN
174		NK3084	Navolger van J. Jordaens	De arts	2084	non-museum institution
175		NK3085	In de stijl van N. Maes	Een oude vrouw met haspel	1482	depot ICN
176		NK3086	Navolger van D. Teniers II	Zittende vrouw met hond en anjer	1964	non-museum institution
177		NK3087	In de stijl van A. van Ostade	Interieur van een herberg met boeren	1536	non-museum institution
178		NK3088	Navolger van G. ter Borch	Portret van een man	2417	non-museum institution
179		NK3107	A. van de Velde	Koeien in een weide	2351	depot ICN
180		NK3259	J. Mostaert	Landschap met een episode uit de verovering van Amerika	2105	Frans Halsmuseum
181		NK3260	J. van Noordt	Nimfen en saters	2892	depot ICN
182		NK3261	P.A. Rotari	Jonge vrouw met zwarte kraag en bloemen in het haar, bekend als "het wufte meisje"	2720 A	non-museum institution
183		NK3262	A. van Beijeren	Stilleven met mosselen	2325	Museum Amstelkring; Ons' Lieve Heer Op Solder
184		NK3263	Atelier van B. Bruyn I	Portret van een man	2618	Bonnefanten museum
185		NK3264	Anoniem	Landschap met opkomend onweer	2676	depot ICN
186		NK3265	F. del Cossa	De rechtvaardigheid van Trajanus	1904	Bonnefanten museum
187		NK3266	Replica A. van Dyck	Ruiterportret van Karel I (1600-1649), koning van Engeland	2152	depot ICN
188		NK3267	Atelier van B. Bruyn I	Portret van een vrouw	2619	Bonnefanten museum
189		NK3268	P.A. Rotari	Jonge vrouw met bonnet, witte sjaal en boek, bekend als "het zedige meisje"	2720 B	non-museum institution
190		NK3270	B. Bruyn I	Portret van een man	2539	Bonnefanten museum
191		NK3271	R. Frueauf II	De legende van de vier gekroonde martelaren	3141	Bonnefanten museum
192		NK3272	Kopie naar H. Memling	Engel met een harp	2446	depot ICN
193		NK3273	Kopie naar H. Memling	Engel met een luit	2447	depot ICN
194		NK3274	J.I. van Ruisdael	Schepen op een turbulente zee	2102	Rijksmuseum Amsterdam
195		NK3280	Meester van de Vrouwelijke Halffiguren	Vanitas	3093	Museum Catharijneconvent
196		NK3291	Navolger van G. Dou	Groenteverkoopster bij kaarslicht	1439	depot ICN
197		NK3380	Vervalsing van N. Maes	Stilleven met bloemkolen	2030	depot ICN
198		NK3383	Anoniem	St. Mauritius en zijn kameraden van het Thebaanse Legioen	2648	Bonnefanten museum
199		NK3384	Navolger van G. Bellini	Madonna met kind	1295	Bonnefanten museum
200		NK3385	Anoniem	Portret van een man	2647	Bonnefanten museum
201		NK3386	Navolger van J.J. van Goyen	Pier met uitkijktoren	1986	depot ICN
202		NK3387	A. van Ostade	Mensen lossen turf en dragen het een huis in	2644	Limburgs Museum
