= Jacques Goudstikker =

Jewish Dutch art dealer

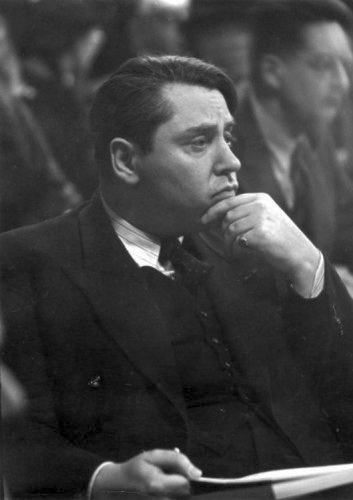
- Jacques Goudstikker in 1938
- Born: 30 August 1897; Amsterdam, Netherlands
- Died: 16 May 1940 (aged 42); On-board the SS Bodegraven in the English Channel
- Occupation: Art dealer
- Years active: 1919–1940
- Spouse: Dési von Halban (m. 1937)
- Children: Edouard von Saher (b. 1939)

Jacques Goudstikker (30 August 1897 – 16 May 1940) was a Jewish Dutch art dealer who fled the Netherlands when it was invaded by Nazi Germany during World War II, leaving three furnished properties and an extensive and significant art collection including over 1,200 paintings, many of which had been previously catalogued as "Old Masters". The entire collection, which had been surveyed by Hermann Göring himself, was subsequently looted by the Nazis. Between the two World Wars, Jacques Goudstikker had been the most important Dutch dealer of Old Master paintings, according to Peter C. Sutton, the former executive director and CEO of the Bruce Museum of Arts and Science. Despite efforts of Goudstikker's widow after the war to regain possession of the collection, it was not until after her death that the Dutch government finally restituted 202 paintings to the Goudstikker family in 2006. To finance efforts to reclaim more of the stolen art, a large portion of them were sold at auction in 2007 for almost $10 million.

== Biography ==
Goudstikker was born in Amsterdam as the son of the art dealer Eduard Goudstikker. He studied at the commercial school in Amsterdam, and pursued further studies with Wilhelm Martin and William Vogelsang at the universities of Leiden and Utrecht.

In 1919, he joined his father's Amsterdam gallery, restructured it as a public besloten vennootschap with himself as the director and major shareholder, and introduced a notably more international style; publishing catalogues in French rather than Dutch, and showing for the first time Italian Renaissance paintings, including The Madonna and Child by Francesco Squarcione. This was revolutionary in the Netherlands of the time, where in 1906, Adriaan Pit, the director of the Rijksmuseum, had stated "We have become chauvinistic with regard to the field of art. This worship of our old school of painting, which started thirty years ago is still alive and appears not to let us appreciate any foreign art."

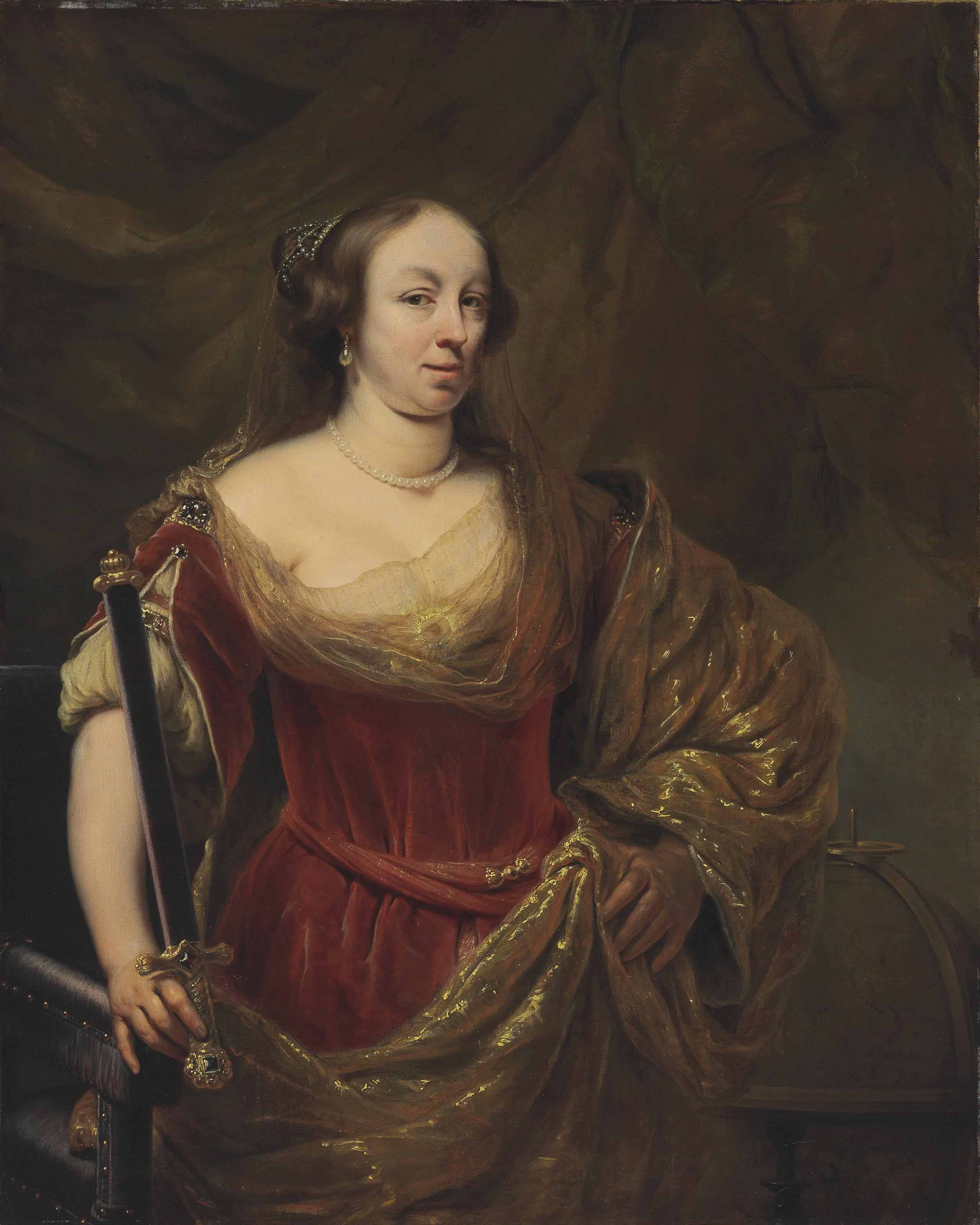
Portrait of Marie Louise Gonzaga, Queen of Poland by Ferdinand Bol, was part of the large restitution agreement in 2006 and was subsequently loaned to the Jewish Museum in Manhattan.

Following World War I, Amsterdam once again became a centre of international commerce, and Goudstikker flourished, along with fellow art dealers, P. de Boer and Henri Douwes; in 1927 he moved to a larger gallery. Goudstikker rose above his contemporaries, presenting works from the Dutch Golden Age alongside panels by 14th-century, 15th-century and 16th-century Dutch, Flemish, German and Italian painters, mixing paintings, sculptures, carpets, and other works of art together, in the sophisticated style of Wilhelm von Bode of Berlin, much emulated in London, Paris, and New York City. Goudstikker's taste extended to the design of his catalogs, which were minor works of art in themselves.

Goudstikker maintained close ties with art historians and collectors. In the introduction to his 1928 catalog, he wrote "[W]e are happy as a logical development in our Italian department in having obtained the assistance of our compatriot Doctor Raimond van Marle", author of the influential The Development of the Italian Schools of Painting. His clients, including Jan Herman van Heek, Daniel G. van Beuningen, Heinrich Baron Thyssen-Bornemisza de Kászon, and Otto Lanz, also partook in this mix of connoisseurship and scholarship.

He staged an exhibit of Dutch and Flemish paintings, including five van Goghs, two van Dongens, and a Mondrian, together with a group of 17th-century works including a wooded landscape by Philips Koninck, at the Anderson Gallery in New York City in 1923, organized through the Dutch Kamer van Koophandel; the Committee of Patrons included the wives of such upper class notables as T. J. Oakley Rhinelander and Cortland S. Van Rensselaer.

The stock market crash and Great Depression took their toll on the connoisseur art trade, as on other luxury businesses. Goudstikker was forced to economize on production of his catalogs, but he still managed to organize a Rubens exhibition in 1933, as well as what may have been his ultimate achievement, participating in the exhibition of Italian Paintings in Dutch Collections at the Stedelijk Museum in Amsterdam in 1934, where he personally showed Queen Wilhelmina the exhibits.

While escaping the Nazis with his wife and their son on the SS Bodegraven Goudstikker died on 15 May 1940. On the deck at night, he failed to see an open hatch and fell into the hold, breaking his neck.

=== Goudstikker's artistic taste ===
Goudstikker's main stock in trade were paintings by the Old Masters; he did not express much interest in Italian Baroque art or art of the 18th century. While his specialty was Dutch 17th-century painting, his specific interest was the more stylized painters such as Cranach, Marco Zoppo, Squarcione and Pesellino, and he was particularly attracted to the unusual. Artists in his collection included Jan Steen, Adriaen van Ostade, Isaac van Ostade, and tonal landscape painters, such as Jan van Goyen and Salomon van Ruysdael. He kept several notable paintings by Jan van der Heyden at Nijenrode Castle, one of his two country homes where he also entertained clients and exhibited great art. Although he did carry some still lifes, such as the Jan van Huysum in the National Gallery, his major interest was in figure painters, whether portraitists such as Jan Antonisz van Ravesteyn or Johannes Cornelisz Verspronck, or subject painters like Hans Bol, Aert de Gelder, or Jan Steen.

Other notable paintings owned by Goudstikker include The entrance to a harbor by Simon de Vlieger, Extensive landscape with trees and a cottage by Philips Koninck, the Ferry Boat with cattle on the River Vecht near Nijenrode by Salomon van Ruysdael, the Saint Lucy by Jacopo del Casentino, The Judgment of Paris by François Boucher, The Fritole Seller by Pietro Longhi, the Madonna and Child by Pacchiarotti, the Christ Carrying the Cross by Hieronymous Bosch which now resides in the Kunsthistorisches Museum of Vienna, and Young Girl with a Flute by Vermeer, which was eventually purchased by Joseph Widener to donate to the National Gallery in Washington, DC in 1942. Other American museum purchases from Goudstikker include a large altarpiece by Luca Signorelli depicting The Assumption of the Virgin with Saints Michael and Benedict, by the Metropolitan Museum in New York in 1929, and Pesellino's King David before the Ark of the Covenant by the Nelson-Atkins Museum of Art in Kansas in 1932.

== Fate of collection ==
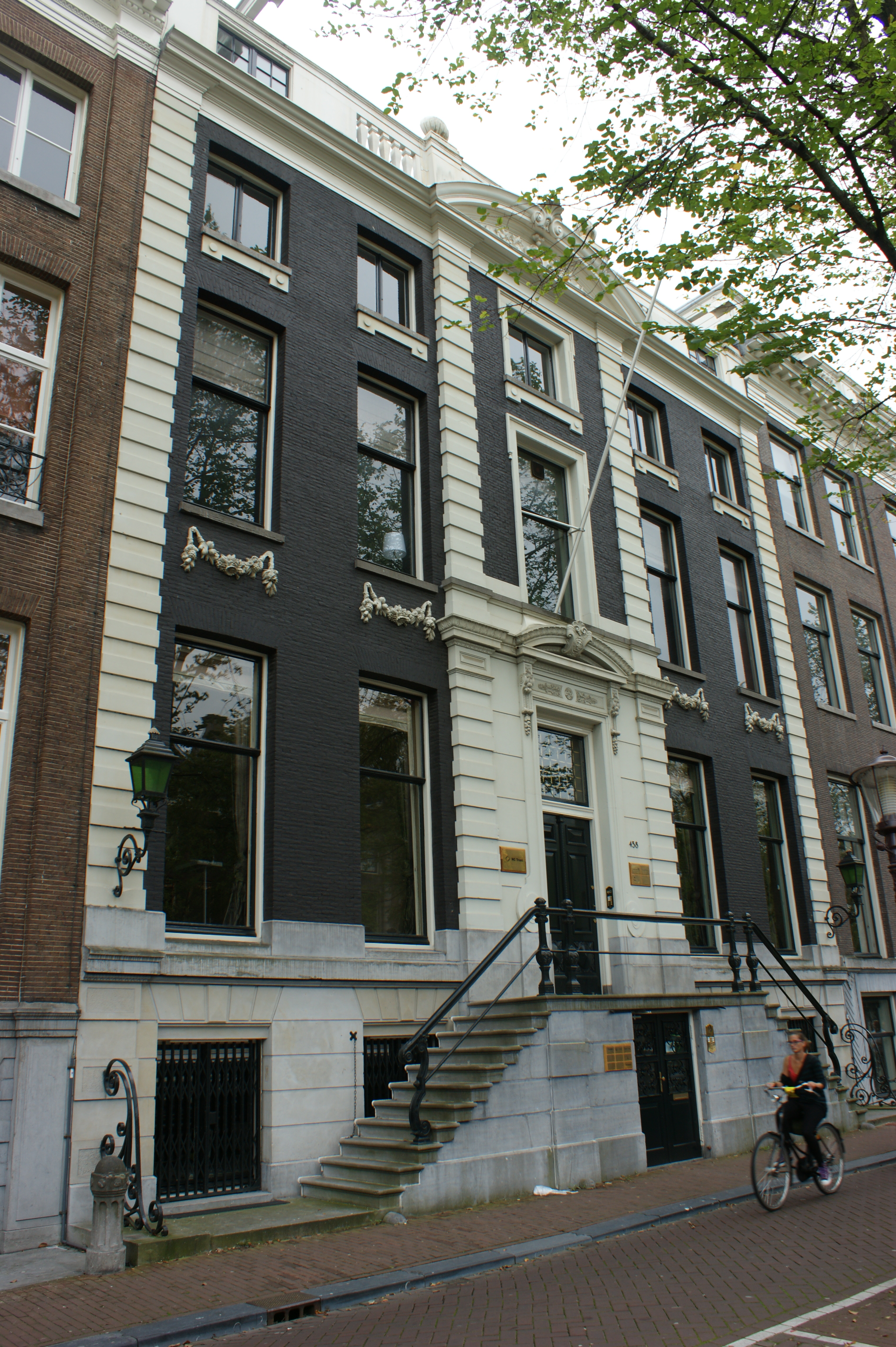
Herengracht 458, in the Gouden Bocht, office and showroom of Jacques Goudstikker from 1927 until 1940

After Goudstikker fled in 1940 the large Goudstikker collection (1,113 numbered paintings and an unknown quantity of unnumbered paintings) was left behind to be looted and became the largest claim for restitution of Nazi-looted art.

In a forced sale that was typical for him, Reichsmarschall Hermann Göring obtained the entire collection over the objections of Goudstikker’s widow Dési von Halban: on 3 June 1940, Goudstikker's employee Arie ten Broek was named director of the company, then, on 13 July, ten Broek and another of Goudstikker's employees, Jan Dik were paid 180 thousand guilders each to sell all paintings and works of art to Göring for two million guilders, a fraction of their value, and the art gallery to German banker Alois Miedl, for 550 thousand guilders. Through a series of transactions later deemed illegal, Miedl acquired title to the J. Goudstikker trade name, what little art remained in the collection, and Goudstikker's real estate (Nijenrode castle in Breukelen, the Herengracht 458 building in Amsterdam, and the country estate Oostermeer in Ouderkerk aan de Amstel). Using Goudstikker's internationally renowned trade name as a marketing asset, Miedl went on to make a fortune selling art, particularly to Nazi Germany.

Parts of the Goudstikker collection were also taken over by Gauleiter Erich Koch; one of these paintings, the Cottages by the canal by Jan van Goyen, is on display at the National Museum, Gdańsk, which declined a restitution in 2020.

Following World War II, the Allied forces recovered this art from Germany and gave them to the Dutch government as part of 'amicable restitution of rights', with the intention of returning them to their rightful owners; however, instead of returning them to Goudstikker's wife Desi, who sought their recovery from 1946 to 1952, they were retained as part of the Netherlands' National Collection at the Rijksmuseum. Dutch investigative journalist Pieter den Hollander wrote a 1998 book, De zaak Goudstikker (The Goudstikker Case), on the subject. Subsequently, Goudstikker's heirs sued for possession of these works, but their claim was rejected by the State Secretary of Education, Culture and Science. Official investigations, however, later confirmed the mishandling of postwar restitutions, and as a result, the Dutch government created the Restitutions Committee to review claims to art treasures in the government's possession. On the recommendations of the Herkomst Gezocht Committee chaired by R. E. O. Ekkart, after eight years of legal battles, in 2006 the Dutch government returned 202 paintings to Goudstikker's sole surviving heir, his daughter-in-law, Marei von Saher. Goudstikker's wife,Dési, and their only son, Edouard, both having died in 1996. Marei von Saher sold in 2007 many of the painting netting almost $10 million at auction.

Some pieces were not returned to von Saher because the Dutch government no longer had them in 2006. In particular, one of the Adam and Eve (Cranach) paintings had been transferred by the government to another person (under a claim later found to be invalid) and in 2006 were in the United States, out of the control of the Dutch government. Von Saher sued unsuccessfully in U.S. court for their return.

In 2025, a painting attributed to Giuseppe Ghislandi, Portrait of a Lady, Contessa Colleoni, was recovered from the descendants of Nazi Germany financier Friedrich Kadgien (1907–1978) in Argentina.

In 2026, it was announced that another painting from the collection - Portrait of a Young Girl by a Dutch artist Toon Kelder had been found in the home of descendants of the Dutch collaborator and Waffen-SS general Hendrik Seyffardt.

== See also ==
- Dési von Halban
- 2006 Goudstikker restitution of 202 paintings
- Tobias and Sarah in Prayer with the Angel Raphael and the Demon
- River Landscape with Ferry
