= August Breisky =

Austrian gynecologist and obstetrician

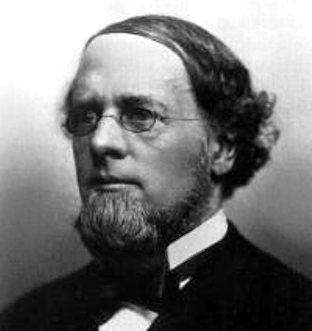
August Breisky

Professor August Breisky (25 March 1832, Klattau (Klatovy), Bohemia, Austrian Empire – 25 May 1889) was an Austrian gynecologist and obstetrician.

He studied medicine in Prague, obtaining his M.D. degree in 1855. At Prague, he served for several years as an assistant to pathologist Václav Treitz (1819–1872) and obstetrician Bernhard Seyfert (1817–1870). In 1865 he received his habilitation with a dissertation about the influence of kyphosis on the pelvic shape.

Ordinary Professor of Obstetrics and Gynaecology to the Surgical School of Salzburg in 1866. Ordinary Professor of Obstetrics and Gynaecology Medical Faculty of Bern (1867–74). Ordinary professor of obstetrics and gynæcology in Prague (1874–86). His first work there was to introduce the strict practice of antiseptic principles. From October 1886, he was a professor of the second obstetrical clinic at the Vienna General Hospital, succeeding Joseph Späth (1823–1896). He died of an intestinal disease at the age of 57; his replacement in Vienna being Rudolf Chrobak (1843–1910).

He initially expressed doubts in regards to theories of puerperal fever that were espoused by Ignaz Semmelweis (1818–1865). Later he became an advocate of Semmelweis' teachings.

He is credited with developing a method for determining accurate measurements of the pelvis. In 1871 he described pyometra and pyocolpos due to atresia of one half of a rudimentary vagina in a septate uterus. Also, he was the first physician to describe kraurosis vulvae.

== Written works ==
- Über den Einfluss der Kyphose auf die Beckengestalt (1865); ("On the influence of kyphosis on the pelvic shape").
- Die Krankheiten der Vagina, (1879); ("Diseases of the vagina"). in Pitha and Billroth's Handbuch der Chirurgie.
