= Leopold Ritter von Dittel =

Austrian urologist

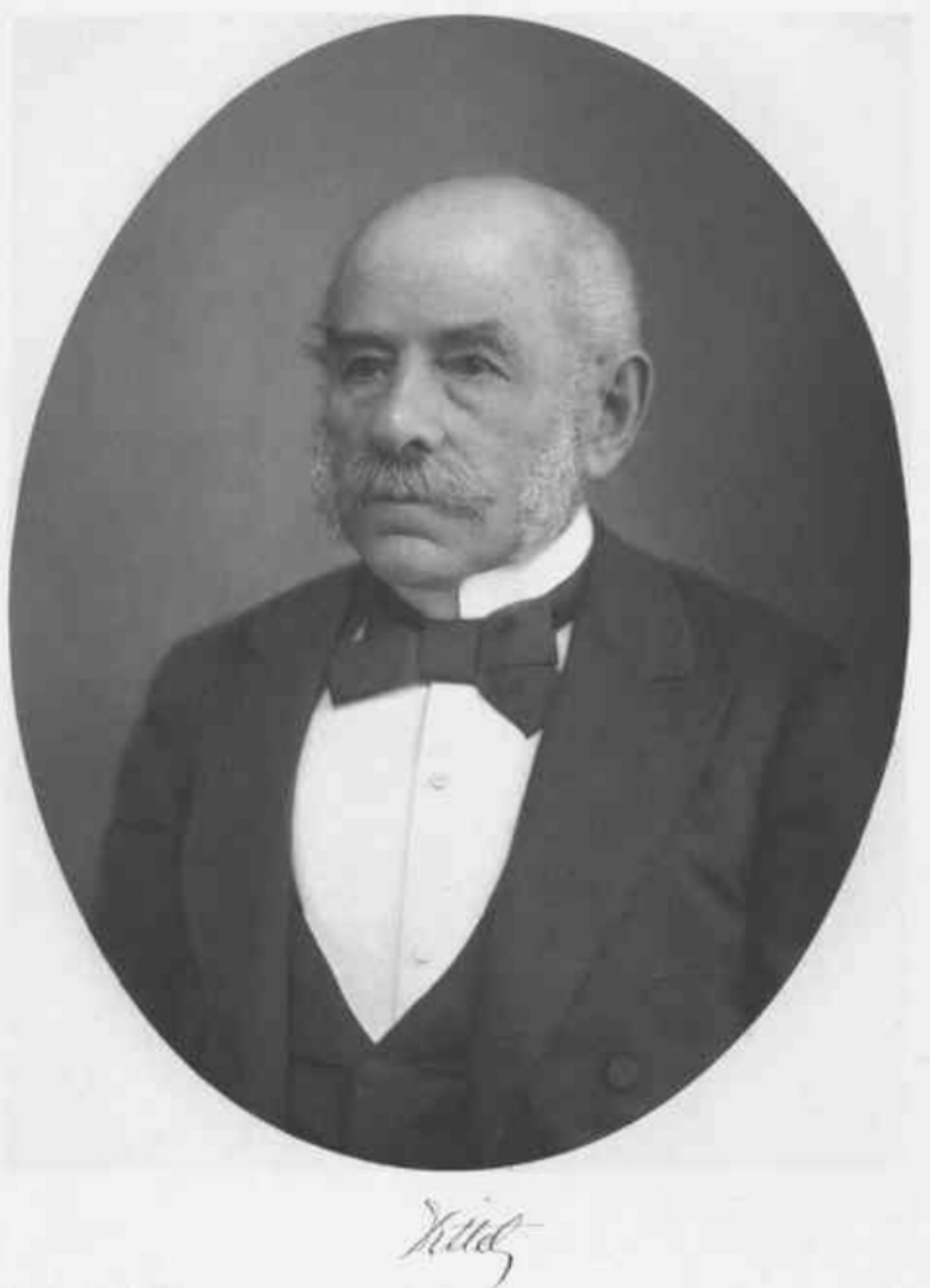
Leopold Ritter von Dittel, photographed by Josef Löwy

Leopold Ritter von Dittel (May 29, 1815 – July 28, 1898) was an Austrian urologist born in Fulnek, a community now located in the Czech Republic.

Dittel received his medical doctorate in 1840 from the University of Vienna, and as a young man worked as a physician in Trentschin-Teplitz. From 1853 to 1857, he was an assistant to Johann von Dumreicher (1815-1880) and a surgical assistant at the university hospital in Vienna. Later, he became surgeon-in-chief of the Allgemeines Krankenhaus, and in 1865 attained the title of associate professor.

He is credited for developing a number of innovative diagnostic and surgical practices in the field of genitourinary medicine. He is remembered for his pioneer diagnostic work with the cystoscope, a device that was a recent invention of urologist Maximilian Nitze (1848–1906). In urology, the cystoscope is used for endoscopic detection of bladder tumors and other urinary disorders. With Felix Legueu (1863–1939) and Émile Forgue (1860–1943), the "Dittel-Forgue-Legueu operation" is named, defined as a surgical procedure for closure of vesicovaginal fistulae (VVF).

A medical instrument used for treatment of stenosis of the urethra known as a "Dittel urethral sound" is named after him.

== Written works ==
- Ueber Klumpfuss, (1851) - treatise on clubfoot.
- Skoliose, (1853) - treatise on scoliosis
- Beiträge zur Pathologie und Therapie der Männlichen Geschlechtstheile, (1859) - Contributions to the pathology and treatment of male genitalia.
- Sekundäre Luxation des Hüftgelenkes, (1861) - Secondary dislocation of hip.
- Der Kathederismus, (1864)
- Beitrag zur Lehre der Hypertrophie der Prostata, in Oesterreichischer Medizinischer Jahrbericht, (1867) - Contribution to the teaching of hypertrophy of the prostate.
- Der Steinsauger, in Allgemeine Wiener Medizinische Zeitung, (1870)
- Die Stricturen der HarnrÖhre (in Franz von Pitha - Theodor Billroth's Handbuch der Chirurgie), (1872) - Strictures of the urethra.
- Zur Behandlung der Hypertrophie der Vorsteherdrüse in Wiener Medizinische Wochenschrift, (1876) - For treatment of hypertrophy of the prostate gland.
- Operationen der Blasensteine, (1880) - Operations for bladder stones.
- Nierencalculose, (1881) - kidney calculus.
