= Friedrich Schauta =

Austrian surgeon and gynecologist

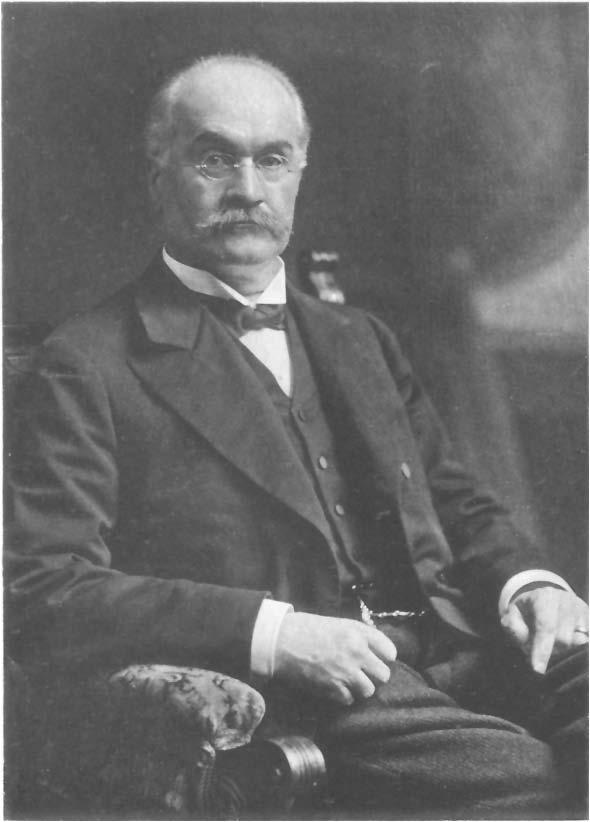
- Friedrich Schauta (1849–1919)
- Born: 15 July 1849; Vienna, Austria
- Died: 10 January 1919 (aged 69); Vienna, Austria
- Education: University of Vienna
- Scientific career
- Fields: Gynecology
- Doctoral advisor: Johann von Dumreicher
- Doctoral students: Ernst Wertheim; Josef von Halban

Friedrich Schauta (15 July 1849 – 10 January 1919) was an Austrian surgeon and gynecologist born in Vienna.

In 1874, he received his medical doctorate at the University of Vienna and, following graduation, remained in Vienna as an assistant at the surgical clinic of Johann von Dumreicher (1815–1880). From 1876 to 1881, Schauta worked under Joseph Späth (1823-1896) at the latter's clinic of obstetrics and gynecology. In 1881, he qualified as an OB/GYN at Vienna, and subsequently relocated to the University of Innsbruck where, in 1884, he became a full professor. Three years later, he succeeded August Breisky (1832-1889) in Prague and, in 1891, returned to Vienna as a successor to Carl Braun (1822-1891) as chair at the first department of gynecology and obstetrics.

Among his students and assistants were Ernst Wertheim (1864–1920), Josef von Halban (1870–1937) and Bianca Bienenfeld (1879–1929).

Schauta is remembered for introducing an operation for uterine cancer in which the uterus and ovaries are removed by way of the vagina (the Schauta-Stoeckel operation). He published numerous articles in the fields of gynecology and obstetrics, two of his better known books being the 1885 Grundriss der operative Geburtshilfe (Outline for Operative Obstetrics) and the 1906 Lehrbuch der gesammten Gynäkologie (Textbook of zcomplete Gynecology).

With Rudolf Chrobak (1843-1910), he planned and managed the construction of a new hospital department for gynecology in Vienna. In 1929, the Schautagasse in Vienna-Favoriten was named in his honor.

== Selected writings ==
- Grundriss der operativen Geburtshilfe (Outline for Surgical Obstetrics). Third edition, Vienna and Leipzig, 1896.
- Die Beckenanomalien (Pelvic Anomalies). In Müller’s Handbuch der Geburtshilfe, second edition. Stuttgart, 1888.
- Indicationsstellung der vaginalen Totalexstirpation (Determination of Indications for Total Vaginal Extirpation). Archiv für Gynäkologie XXXIX. Berlin, 1891.
- Indication und Technik der vaginalen Totalexstirpation (Indications and Technique of Total Vaginal Extirpation). Zeitschrift für Heilkunde XII. Prague and Vienna, 1891.
- Indication und Technik der Adnexoperationen (Indications and Techniques for Adnexal Surgery). Verhandlungen der deutschen Gesellschaft für Gynäkologie V. Leipzig, 1893.
- Sectio caesarea vaginalis (Vaginal Caesarean Section). Heilkunde. Vienna, 1898.
- Lehrbuch der gesamten Gynäkologie (Textbook of Comprehensive Gynecology). Leipzig and Vienna, 1895-1894; Italian translation Turin, 1898; third edition, 1906/1907.
- Die Österreichischen Gebäranstalten 1848-1898 (Austrian Maternity Hospitals from 1848 to 1898). In Österreichische Wohlfahrtseinrichtungen, third edition. Vienna, 1901.
- Tabulae gynaecologicae (Gynecological Tables) with Fritz Hitschmann. Vienna, 1905.

== Associated eponyms ==
- Schauta's operation: surgical removal of the uterus and the adnexa (ovaries and oviducts).
- Schauta-Stoeckel operation: now known as a radical vaginal hysterectomy with lymphadenectomy. This surgical procedure is done for early stages of uterine cancer. Named with German gynecologist Walter Stoeckel (1871-1961) who cooperated with the Nazis during World War II.
