= Wenzel von Linhart =

Austrian surgeon

Wenzel von Linhart (6 June 1821 in Seelowitz – 22 October 1877 in Würzburg) was an Austrian surgeon.

He studied medicine in Vienna, where his influences included anatomist Christian Joseph Berres and surgeon Joseph Wattmann. From 1845 to 1849, he was an assistant in the lectures of Johann von Dumreicher, and in 1852 became a privat-docent of operative surgery at the University of Vienna. In 1856 he replaced Adolf Morawek (1816-1855) as professor of the surgical clinic at the University of Würzburg. As a result of his work with the wounded in the Austro-Prussian War (1866), he was named Royal Bavarian Councillor in 1867. During the Franco-Prussian War, he distinguished himself in his role as a Bavarian general physician.

== Published works ==
An adherent of topographical anatomy, he was a skilled surgeon and considered an excellent teacher. The following are three of his principal writings.

- Ueber die Schenkelhernie, 1852 - On the femoral hernia.
- Compendium der chirurgischen Operationslehre, (1856; fourth edition, 1874) - Compendium of surgical operation lectures.
- Vorlesungen über Unterleibs-Hernien (1866; new edition, 1882) - Lectures on abdominal hernias.
