= Ernst Ludwig Alfred Hegar =

German gynecologist

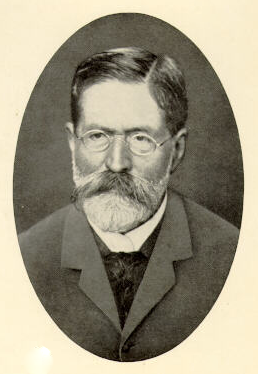
Alfred Hegar

Ernst Ludwig Alfred Hegar, aka Alfred Hegar, was a German gynecologist famous for developing new medical tools and techniques. He was born on 6 January 1830 in Darmstadt, Germany and died on 5 August 1914. He was buried in Breisgau.

Hegar was the son of Johann August Hegar (1794–1882), a country Doctor. He studied medicine in Giessen, Heidelberg, Berlin and Vienna, and after graduation went into the army and worked as military physician. He later went into private practice as an obstetrician in the city of Darmstadt.

Alfred Hegar was chosen to be the successor of Otto Spiegelberg as professor for gynecology and obstetrics at the University of Freiburg in 1864 and was the first head of the Universitäts-Frauenklinik of the University Medical Center Freiburg when it opened in 1868.

He is considered to be the first surgeon to have performed an oophorectomy on 27 July 1872. He hoped to treat hysteria through this surgery but this approach was later abandonned.

Hegar also founded the journal "Beiträge zur Geburthilfe und Gynäkologie" in 1898. He was a pioneer of antiseptics and antiseptic procedures. Hegar retired in 1904.

Among the many techniques and instruments he developed were Hegar's sign and Hegar dilators, as well as Hegar's operation, an operation for repairing a ruptured perineum. His works are still widely discussed at colleges of obstetrics worldwide.

With gynecologist Rudolf Kaltenbach, he was co-author of Operative Gynäkologie, published in three editions.

With his 1894 work, The Sexual Drive: A Social-Medical Study, Hegar was also among the first advocates of negative eugenics or racial hygiene. He called for eugenic measures to "at least put an end to the greatest harms of the present condition and to limit the production of frail, wretched people." In 1905, he became an honorary member of the German Society for Racial Hygiene, which was founded that year in Berlin.

== References and further reading ==
- Paul Diepgen: Die deutsche Medizin und Gynäkologie im Zeitalter der Wissenschaftlichen Anfänge von Alfred Hegar, Deutsche Medizinische Wochenschrift, Berlin, 1930.
- A. Mayer: Alfred Hegar und der Gestaltwandel der Gynäkologie seit Hegar, Freiburg, 1961.
- Dorland's Illustrated Medical Dictionary
