= Ernst Wertheim =

Austrian gynecologist (1864–1920)

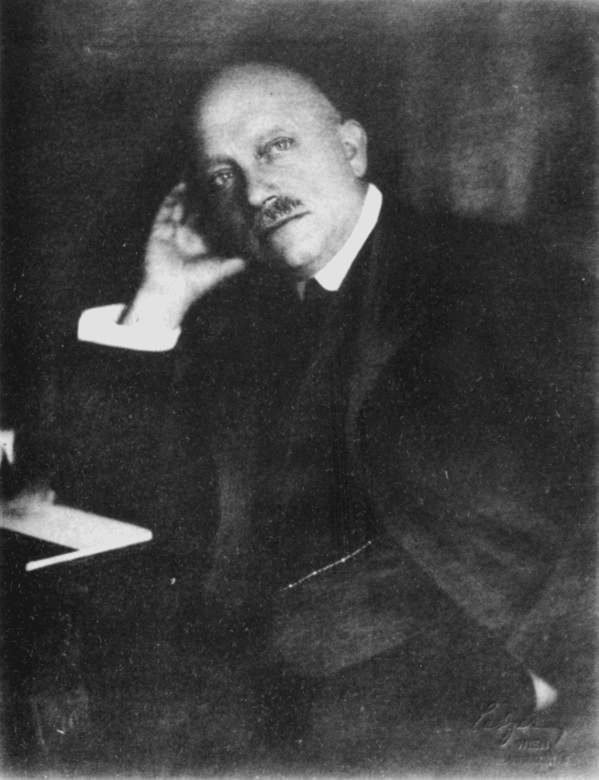
- Born: 21 February 1864; Graz, Austrian Empire
- Died: 15 February 1920 (aged 55); Vienna, Austria
- Education: University of Graz
- Scientific career
- Fields: Gynecology

Ernst Wertheim (21 February 1864 – 15 February 1920) was an Austrian gynecologist born in Graz.

Ernst Wertheim was the son of Theodor Wertheim, an Austrian chemistry professor at the University of Graz, remembered for his chemical studies of garlic. He received his doctorate from the University of Graz on February 29, 1888, and subsequently became an assistant in the department of general and experimental pathology. In 1889 he worked under Otto Kahler (1849–1893) at the second university clinic in Vienna, followed by an assignment at the second Vienna women's clinic under Rudolf Chrobak (1843–1910). He worked there until September 30, 1890, when he relocated to Prague as an assistant to Friedrich Schauta (1849–1919) at the university women’s clinic. When Schauta was appointed to head the University Hospital of Vienna, Wertheim followed him back to Vienna, where he obtained his habilitation for gynecology and obstetrics in 1892.

In 1897 he became chief surgeon in the gynecological department at Bettina Pavilions der Elisabeth-Klinik, and in 1910 he became director of the first Vienna women's clinic.

On November 16, 1898, Wertheim performed the first radical abdominal hysterectomy for cervical cancer. This operation involved removal of the uterus, parametrium, tissues surrounding the upper vagina, and pelvic lymph nodes, but leaving the ovaries intact. Afterwards, Wertheim surgery became a fairly common, although risky procedure for cervical cancer. He conducted important research of gonorrhea in the female genital tract, and was the first physician to demonstrate the presence of gonococcus in the peritoneum. Also, he discovered that gonococcus grows best on a culture of agar mixed with human blood serum.

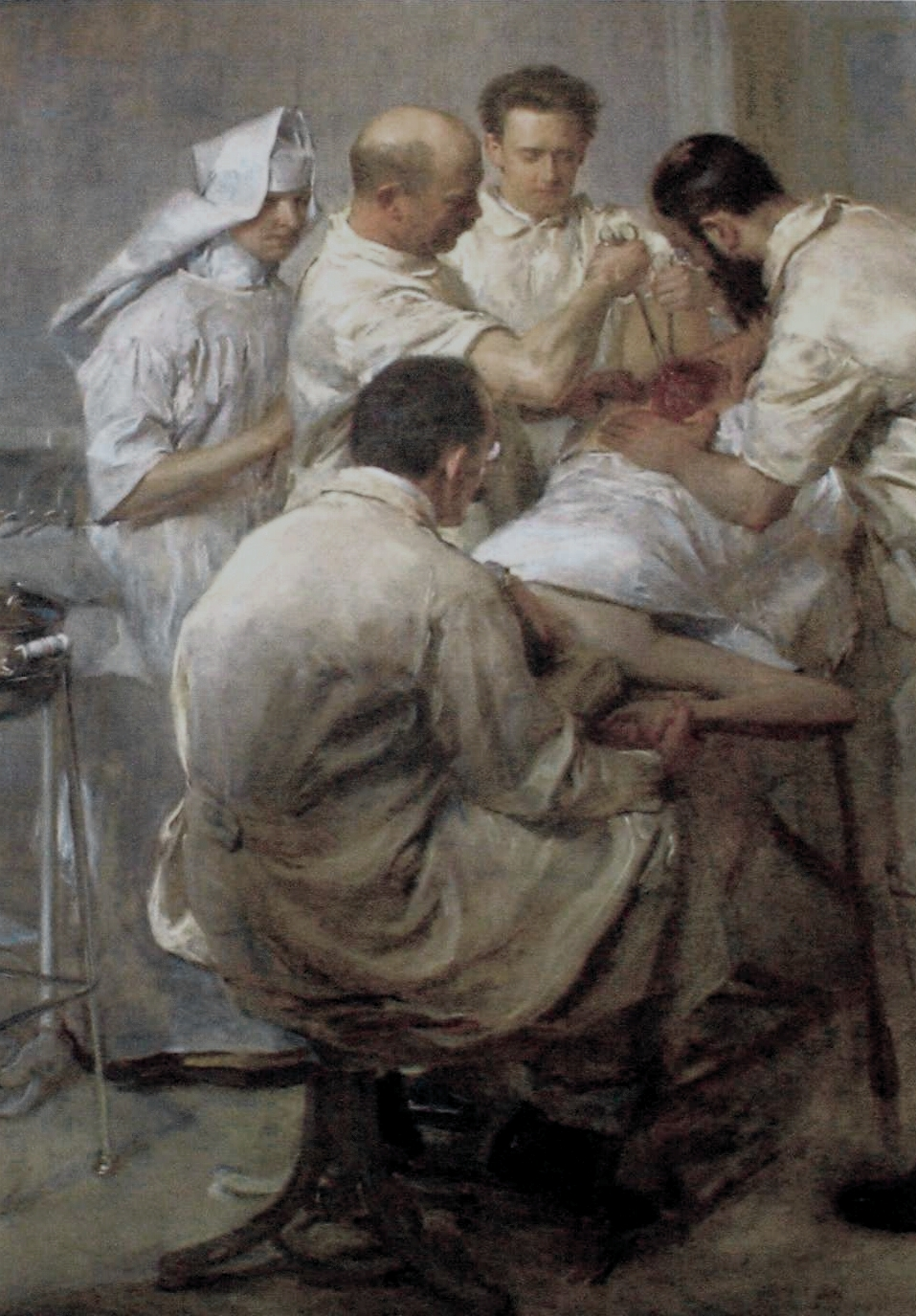
Ernst Wertheim in an operation 1907 (painting by John Quincy Adams)

In 1899, Wertheim was appointed as a professor at the University of Vienna. In 1910, he was transferred to the Second University Hospital of Vienna, where he devoted himself to developing surgical techniques for the treatment of uterine prolapse.

Wertheim died in 1920 in Vienna. He received an honorary grave at the Zentralfriedhof.

A type of hysterectomy forceps, called the "Wertheim's vaginal clamp", is named after him.

== Selected writings ==
- Die aszendierende Gonorrhoe beim Weibe. Bakteriologische und klinische Studien zur Biologie des Gonococcus neisser (Archiv für Gynäkologie, 1892; 42: 1-86) - Ascending gonorrhea in women. Bacteriological and clinical studies on the biology of "gonococcus Neisser".
- Ueber Uterus-Gonorrhöe, Verhandlungen der Deutschen Gesellschaft für Gynäkologie, 1896, 6 199-223. - treatise on gonorrhea of the uterus.
- Über Blasen-Gonorrhöe, Zeitschrift für Geburtshilfe und Gynäkologie, Stuttgart, 1895, 35: 1-10. - treatise of gonorrhea of the bladder, (here, Wertheim demonstrated gonococcus in acute cystitis).
- Die Technik der vaginalen Bauchhöhlen-Operationen, (with H. Micholitsch). Leipzig, 1906; translated into English as "The technique of vagino-peritoneal operations" (1907).
