= Ida Krzyzanowski-Doxat =

Austrian opera singer (1867–1947)

Ida Krzyzanowski-Doxat (born Ida Doxat: 24 January 1867 – 8 March 1947) was an Austrian opera singer (soprano).

== Life ==
Ida Doxat was born at Senožeče (Carniola), a mountain village a short distance inland to the north-east of Trieste and Koper. At the time she was born the region was part of the Austro-Hungarian empire. Her father worked for the government as an imperial district commissioner. She was "discovered" (vocally) by the Viennese coloratura soprano, Marie Wilt.

Doxat took singing lessons from Luise Dustmann and then, in 1889, made her stage debut at Halle as Elisabeth in Tannhäuser. She worked during 1890 at the Stadttheater am Brausenwerth in Elberfeld, Wuppertal. Between 1891 and 1895 she was at the Leipzig Theatre, then moving on to the Stadttheater in Hamburg, where she stayed until 1898 or 1899. Her next transfer was to the Court Theatre at Weimar, where she was a member of the company for the next five years.

Ida Krzyzanowski-Doxat (as she became known, through her marriage during the later 1890s) was known as an exceptional Wagner interpreter. She was invited to the Münchener Mustervorstellungen (demonstration presentations) to give performances of Isolde and Senta, respectively in Tristan und Isolde and Der fliegende Holländer, and she participated as Brünhilde in at least one Dresden Wagner Cycle. Other career highlights included a series of 1904 guest appearances at the Vienna State Opera. She also appeared each year during mist of the 1890s in London where she took part in the annual Wagner Concerts. She continued to live at Weimar until 1939 despite having ceased to be a regular member of the company at the Court Theatre in 1904 or 1905 (sources differ). During the later part of her singing career she successfully advanced her reputation as a concert performer.

Critics of the time described her as an outstanding interpreter for productions calling for performances of high drama, with a particular depth of truthfulness and feeling, able to combine burning passion with formidable reserves of self control. Her consistently professional application of vocal technique won particular plaudits. Notwithstanding her reputation as a Wagner singer, she also made noteworthy appearances in the Meyerbeer operas popular at the time, along with leading soprano roles in Fidelio and Don Giovanni.

== Personal ==
Ida Doxat was married to the conductor Rudolf Krzyzanowski. Towards the end of the 1890s their careers overlapped at Hamburg and again at Weimar. The date of place of their marriage are unclear; but at least one source describes her as Krzyzanowski's wife as early as 1896.
