= Joseph Wattmann =

Austrian surgeon

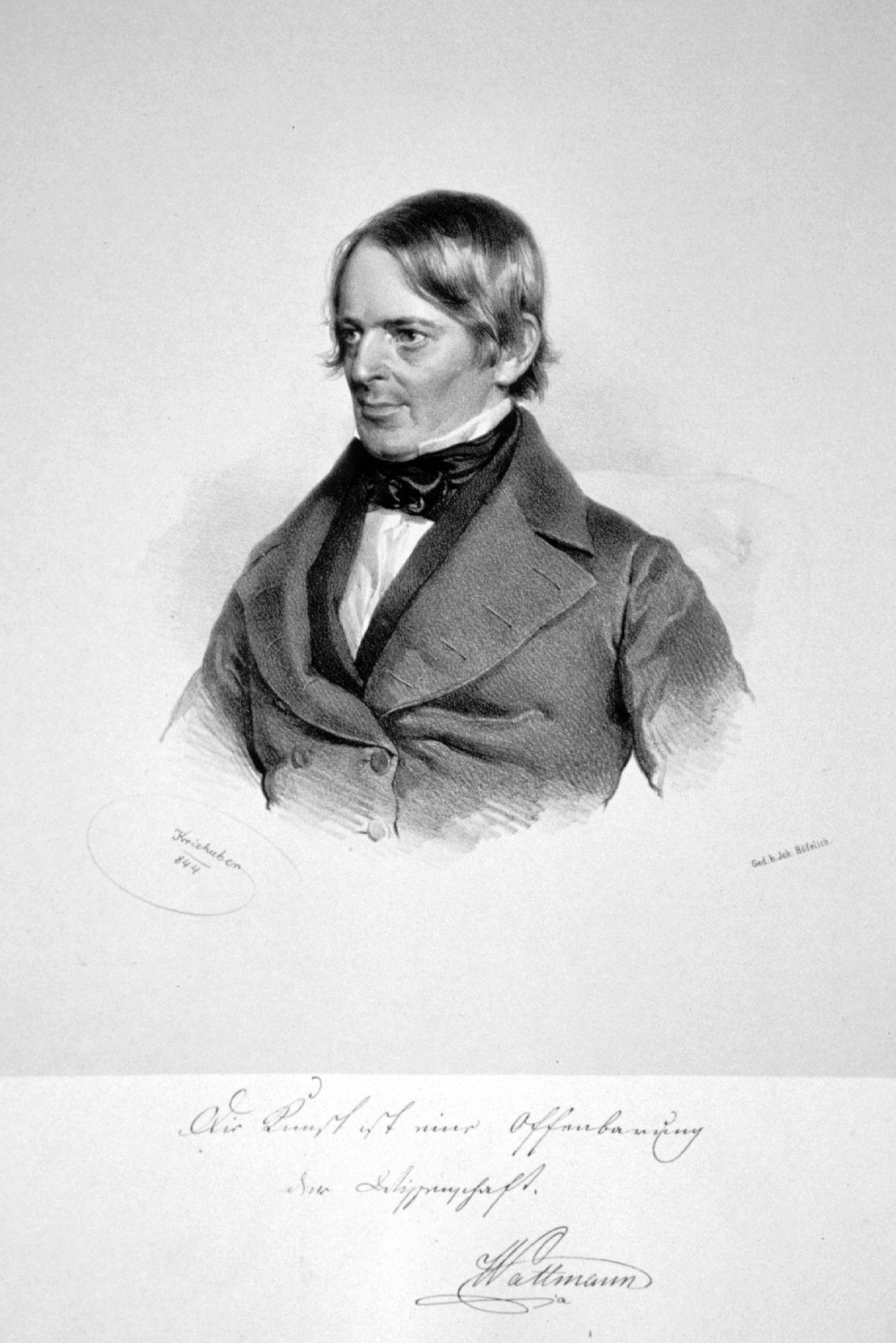
Joseph Wattmann (1789-1866)

Joseph Wattmann von Maëlcamp-Beaulieu (6 March 1789, Oberlangbath – 14 September 1866) was an Austrian surgeon.

He studied medicine at the surgical academy associated with Vienna General Hospital, afterwards working as a physician and surgeon in Wels. He then served as an assistant to Vincenz Ritter von Kern (1760–1829) in Vienna. In 1816 he was appointed professor of theoretical and practical surgery at the Lyceum in Laibach.

From 1818 he was a professor of surgery and chief surgeon at the Heilgegeist hospital in Innsbruck. Following a scientific journey to Italy, he was appointed professor of practical surgery and director of the surgical institute in Vienna (1824). Here, his students included Franz Schuh (1804–1865) and Johann von Dumreicher (1815–1880).

Wattmann was a pioneer of lithotripsy in Austria, publishing a detailed account of the procedure in the treatise Über die Steinzerbohrung und ihr Verhältniß zum Blasenschnitte. Also, he made important contributions towards the treatment and understanding of air embolisms.

A thoroughfare in the Hietzing district of Vienna, the Wattmanngasse, is named in his honor.

== Selected writings ==
- Versuch zur Heilung des sonst unheilbar erklaerten Noli me tangere, 1823 - Attempts to cure the incurable, otherwise stated as "Noli me tangere".
- Beschreibung des Skelettes mit elastischer Gelenksverbindung zur pathologischen und therapeutischen Darstellung der Verrenkungen, 1823 - Description of a mannequin for pathological and therapeutic presentation of dislocations.
- Handbuch der Chirurgie, 1829-1839 - Textbook of surgery.
- Über die Steinzerbohrung und ihr Verhältniss zum Blasenschnitte, 1835 - Lithotripsy and its relation to bladder resections.
- Sicheres Heilverfahren bei dem schnell gefährlichen Lufteintritt in die Venen und dessen gerichtsärztliche Wichtigkeit, 1843 - treatise on air embolisms.
