= Dolany (Klatovy District) =

- Municipality
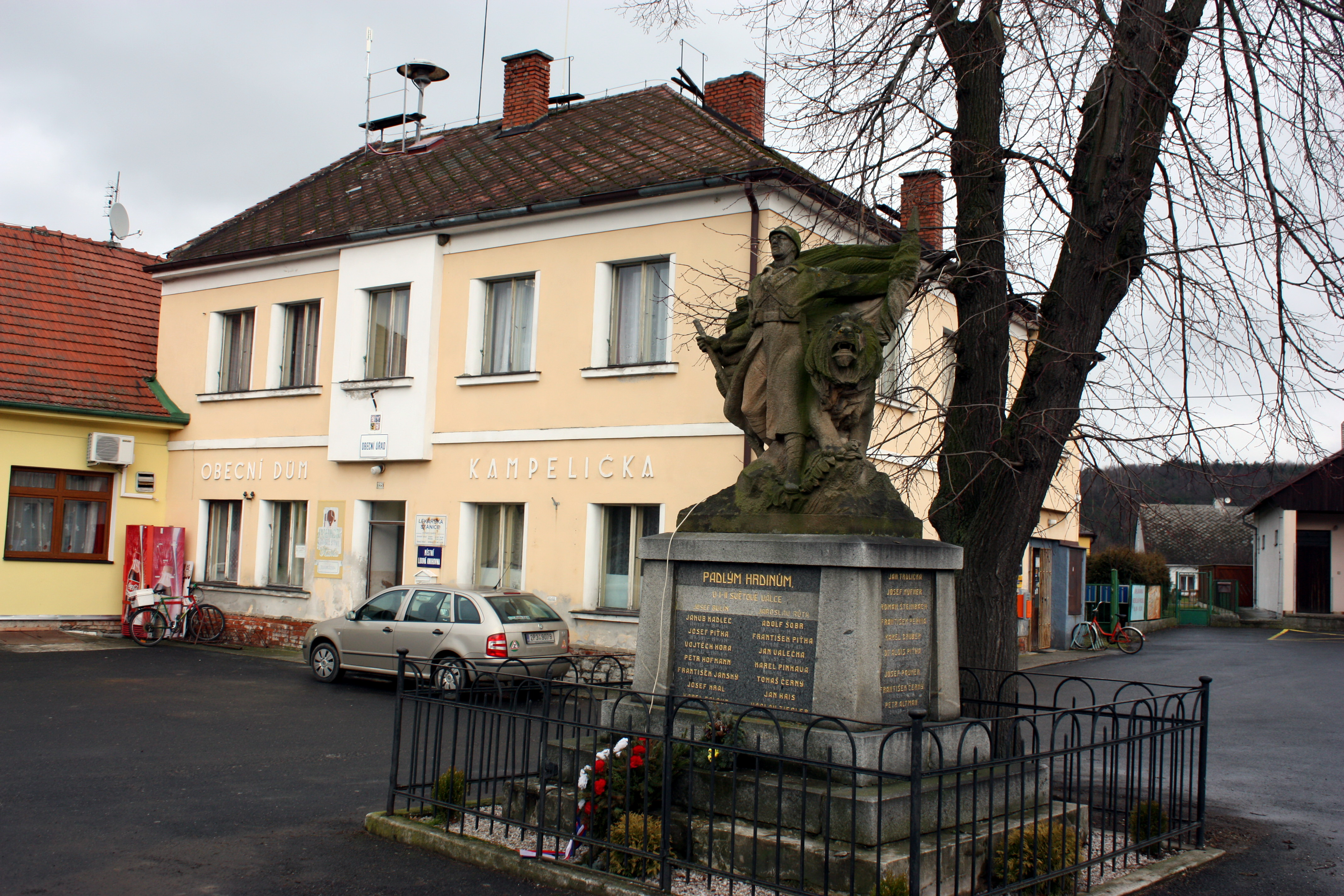
- Centre of Dolany

- Coat of arms

- Location in the Czech Republic
- Coordinates: 49°26′36″N 13°14′53″E
- Country: Czech Republic
- Region: Plzeň
- District: Klatovy
- First mentioned: 1232

Area
  - Total: 25.29 km^{2} (9.76 sq mi)
- Elevation: 387 m (1,270 ft)

Population (2026-01-01)
  - Total: 973
  - Density: 38.5/km^{2} (99.6/sq mi)
- Time zone: UTC+1 (CET)
  - Summer (DST): UTC+2 (CEST)
- Postal code: 339 01
- Website: www.obec-dolany.cz

Dolany is a municipality and village in Klatovy District in the Plzeň Region of the Czech Republic. It has about 1,000 inhabitants.

Dolany lies approximately 7 kilometres (4 mi) north-west of Klatovy, 35 km (22 mi) south of Plzeň, and 111 km (69 mi) south-west of Prague.

== Administrative division ==
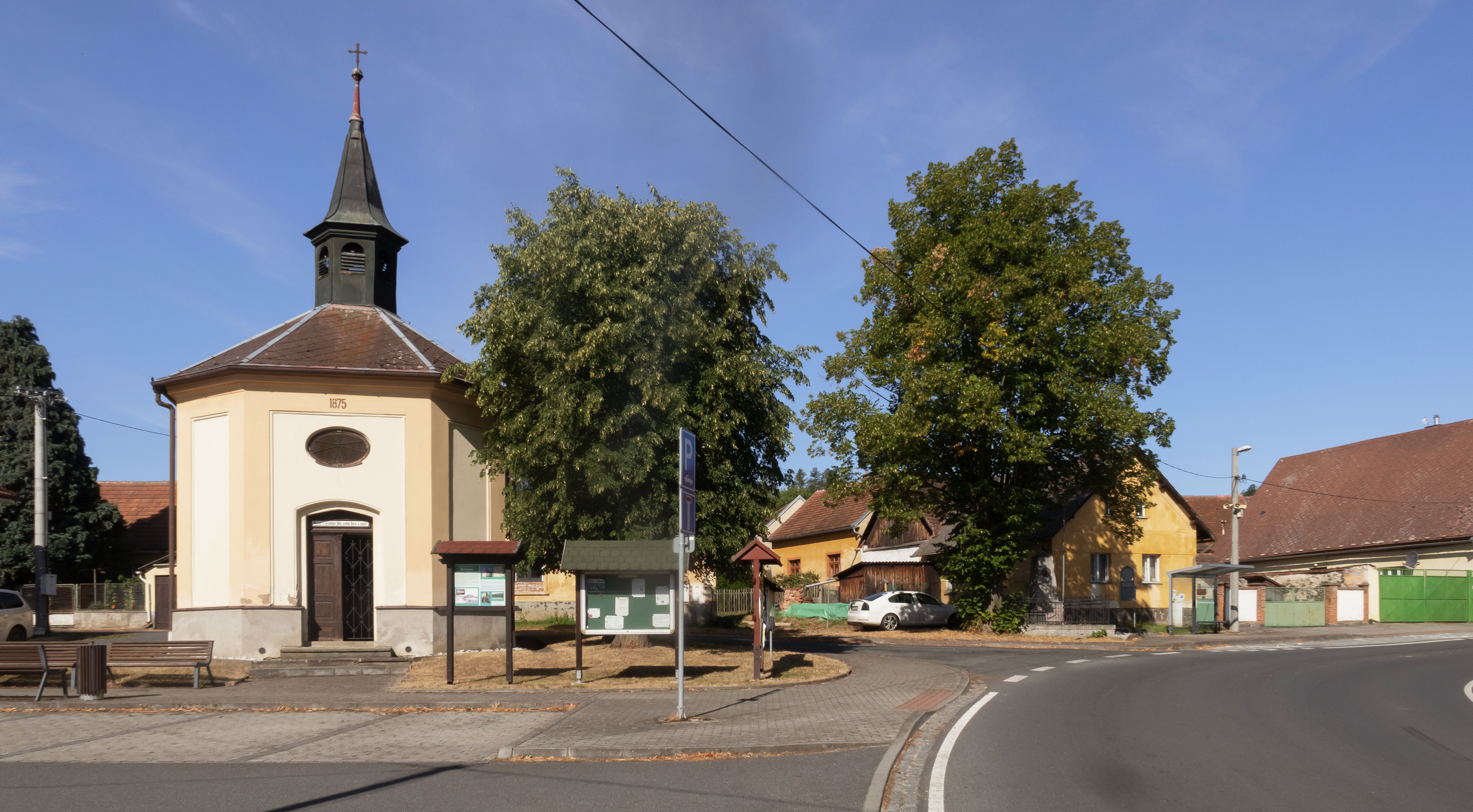
Chapel of Saint Anne in Svrčovec

Dolany consists of nine municipal parts (in brackets population according to the 2021 census):

- Dolany (409)
- Andělice (27)
- Balkovy (22)
- Komošín (5)
- Malechov (125)
- Řakom (33)
- Sekrýt (16)
- Svrčovec (239)
- Výrov (47)

== Etymology ==
The name Dolany is derived from the Czech word důl (in Old Czech written as dól), i.e. 'valley'.

== Demographics ==
Historical population
Year	Pop.	±%
1869	1,714	—
1880	1,753	+2.3%
1890	1,725	−1.6%
1900	1,701	−1.4%
1910	1,761	+3.5%
1921	1,746	−0.9%
1930	1,577	−9.7%
1950	1,159	−26.5%
1961	1,191	+2.8%
1970	1,000	−16.0%
1980	882	−11.8%
1991	764	−13.4%
2001	730	−4.5%
2011	814	+11.5%
2021	923	+13.4%
Source: Censuses

== Notable people ==
- Franz von Pitha (1810–1875), Austrian surgeon
