= Germain Sée =

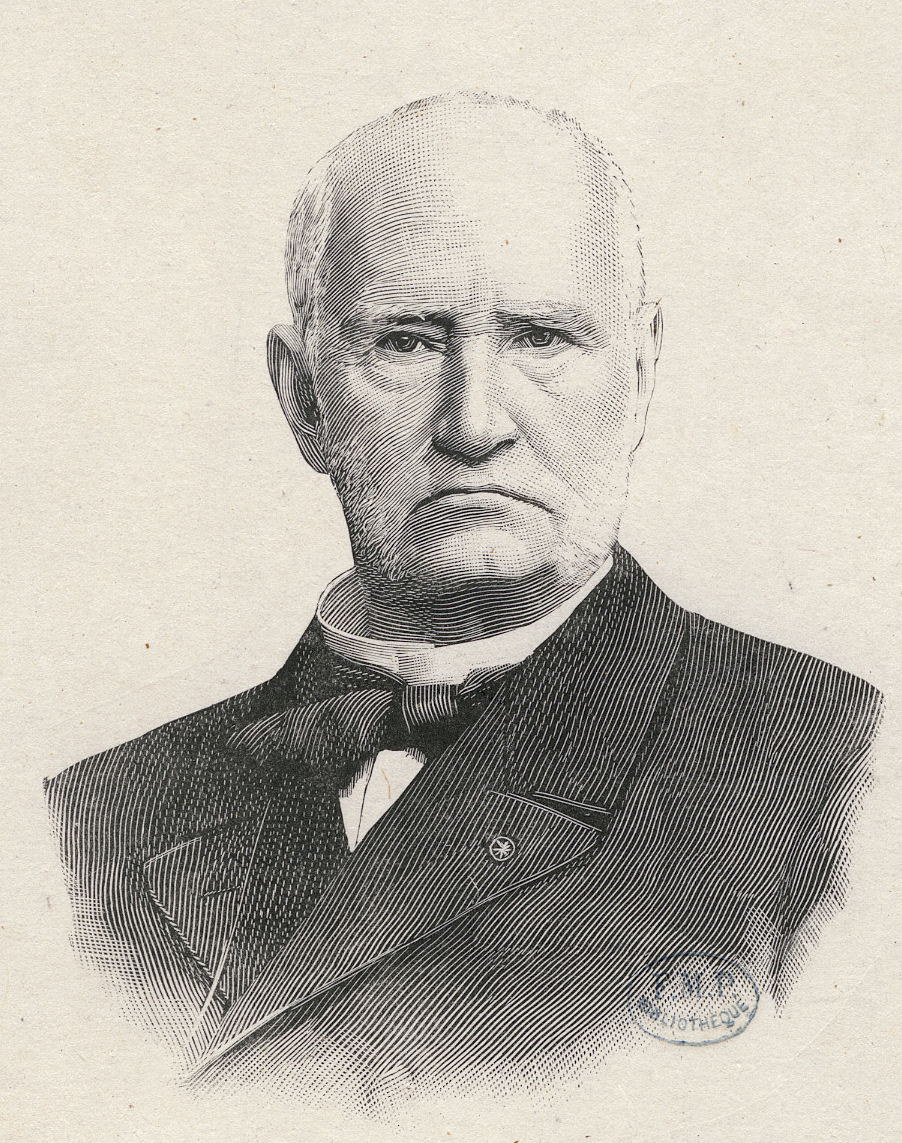
Germain Sée

Germain Sée (February 6, 1818 – May 12, 1896) was a French clinician who was a native of Ribeauvillé, Haut-Rhin.

He studied medicine in Paris, obtaining his doctorate in 1846 with a dissertation on ergotism ("Recherches sur les propriétés du seigle ergoté et de ses principes constituants"). In 1852 he became a physician of hospitals in Paris, and subsequently worked at La Rochefoucauld (from 1857), Beaujon (from 1861), Pitié (from 1862) and Charité (from 1868) hospitals. In 1866 he succeeded Armand Trousseau as chair of therapeutics at the Faculty of Medicine in Paris, and in 1876 attained the chair of clinical medicine at the Hôtel-Dieu de Paris.

Sée specialized in the study of lung and cardiovascular diseases. He also made contributions in his research of chorea and its association with rheumatic disorders. He conducted extensive studies of various drugs, being an advocate of antipyrine as a general analgesic, and sodium salicylate for treatment of acute rheumatism. Sée also contributed to the diffusion of uses of hemp extract and tincture in soothing mild gastrointestinal disorders:

Professor Germain Sée reported an elaborate work as to the value and uses of cannabis indica in the treatment of [gastric intestinal] neuroses and gastric dyspepsia. […] In conclusion, See maintains that cannabis is a true sedative to the stomach, and without any of the inconveniences of the narcotics.

Among his writings were the multi-volume "Médecine clinique", a work that he co-authored with Frédéric Labadie-Lagrave, and "Leçons de pathologie expérimentale", a book on experimental pathology that was edited by Maurice Raynaud. His "Des maladies spécifiques, non tuberculeuses, du poumon" was later translated into English and published with the title "Diseases of the lungs (of a specific not tuberculous nature)" (1885).

In 1869 he became a member of the Académie de Médecine.
