= Scheibbs =

- Municipality
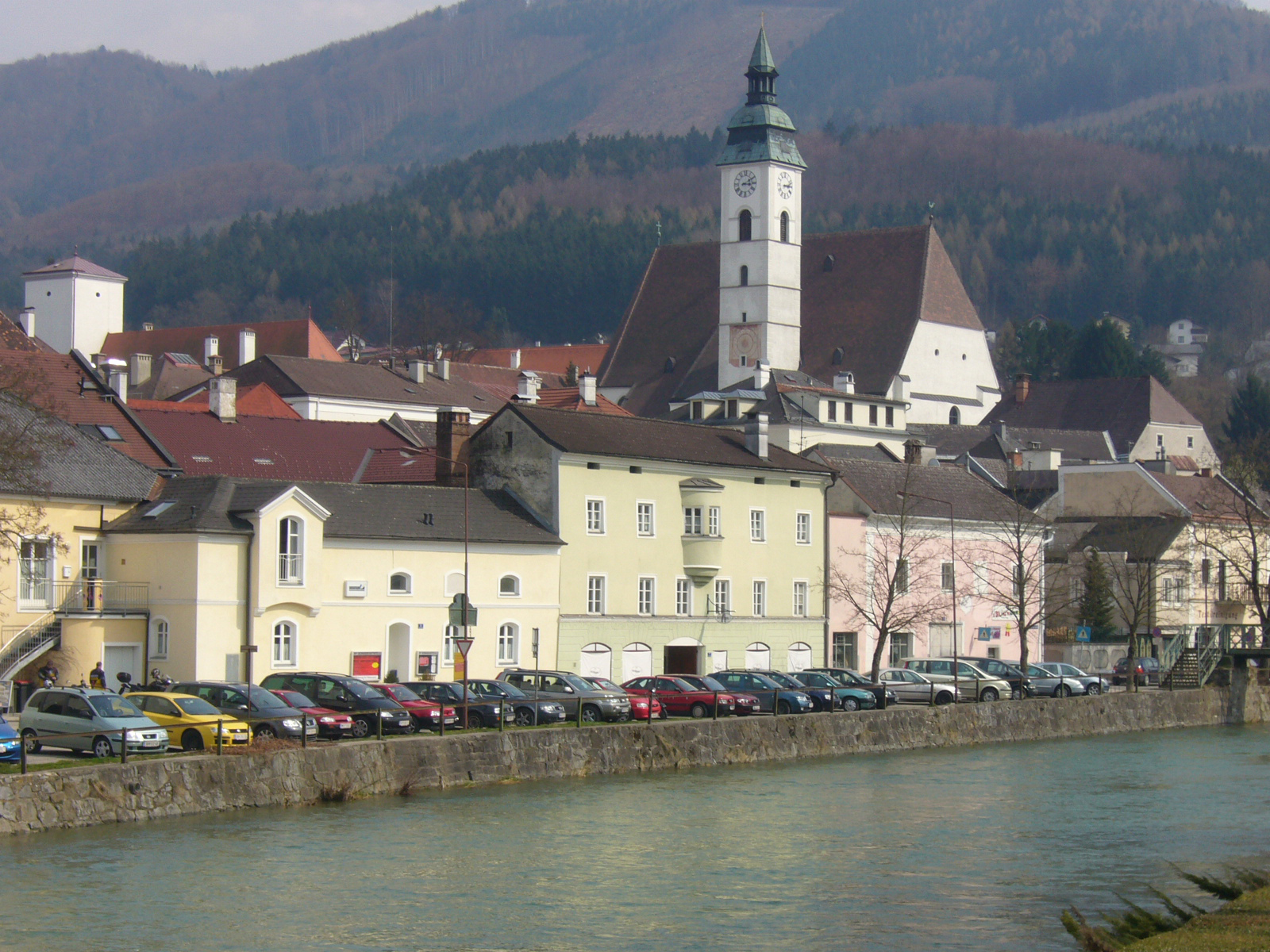
- Old Town of Scheibbs

- Coat of arms

- Location within Austria Location within Lower Austria
- Coordinates: 48°00′00″N 15°10′00″E
- Country: Austria
- State: Lower Austria
- District: Scheibbs

Government
  - Mayor: David Pöcksteiner (SPÖ)

Area
  - Total: 45.88 km^{2} (17.71 sq mi)
- Elevation: 339 m (1,112 ft)

Population (2018-01-01)
  - Total: 4,196
  - Density: 91.46/km^{2} (236.9/sq mi)
- Time zone: UTC+1 (CET)
  - Summer (DST): UTC+2 (CEST)
- Postal code: 3270
- Area code: 07482
- Vehicle registration: SB
- Website: www.scheibbs.com

Scheibbs (German pronunciation: [ʃaɪ̯ps]) is a town in Austria in the Scheibbs district of Lower Austria. In 1886, it became the first town in Austria to have street lighting powered by electricity.

== Population ==
Historical population
Year	Pop.	±%
1869	3,076	—
1880	3,259	+5.9%
1890	3,489	+7.1%
1900	3,776	+8.2%
1910	4,061	+7.5%
1923	3,703	−8.8%
1934	3,720	+0.5%
1939	3,615	−2.8%
1951	4,047	+12.0%
1961	4,101	+1.3%
1971	4,445	+8.4%
1981	4,515	+1.6%
1991	4,389	−2.8%
2001	4,331	−1.3%
2011	4,236	−2.2%
2021	4,122	−2.7%

== Mayors ==
- 1950-1965: Anton Herok
- 1965-1983: Alois Derfler
- 1983-2007: Leopold Gansch
- 2007-2009: Johann Schragl
- 2009-2019: Christine Dünwald
- 2019-2025: Franz Aigner
- since 2025: David Pöcksteiner

== Twin towns – sister cities ==
Scheibbs is twinned with:

- Rutesheim, Baden-Württemberg, Germany (1972)

== Notable residents ==
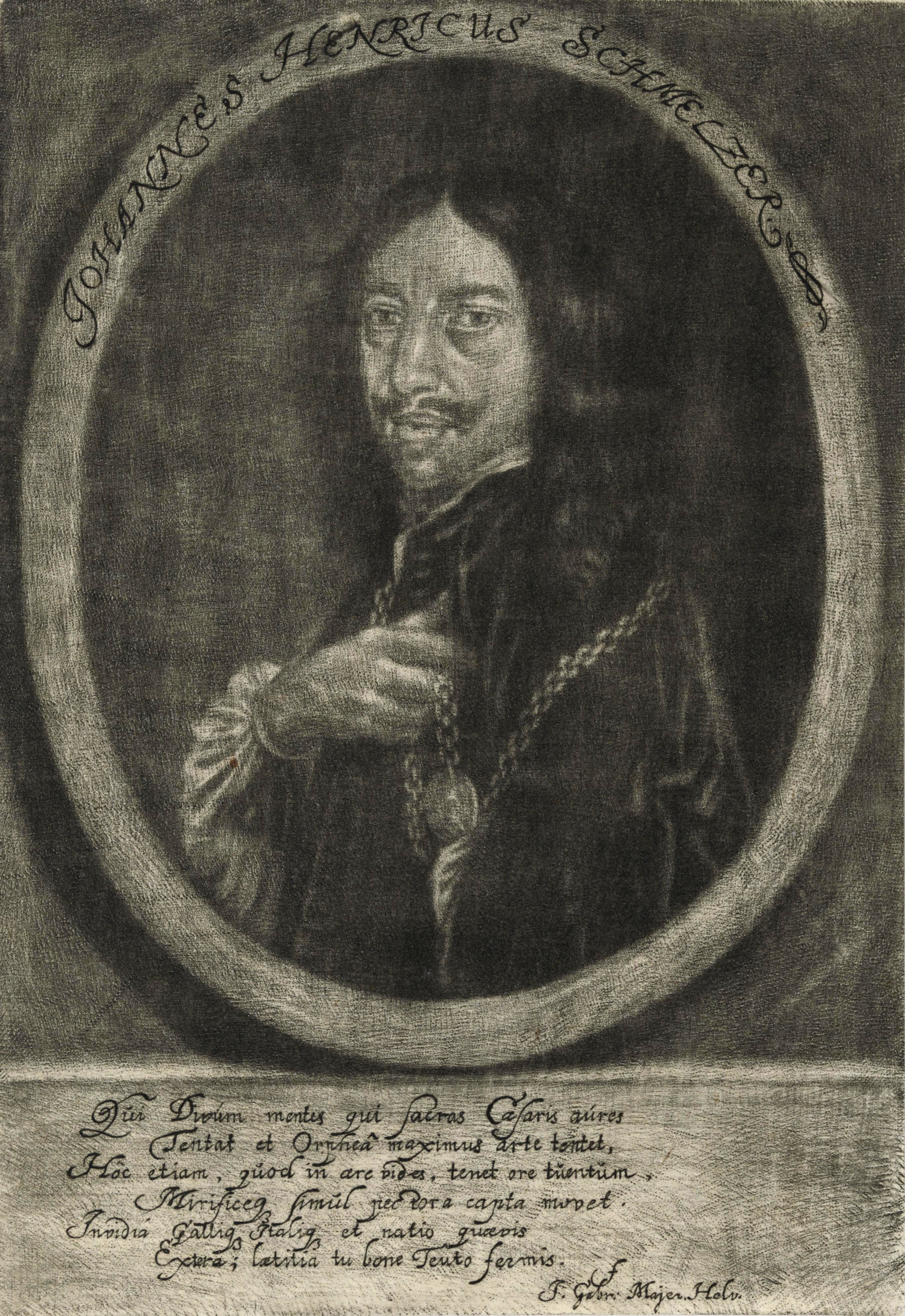
Johann Heinrich Schmelzer

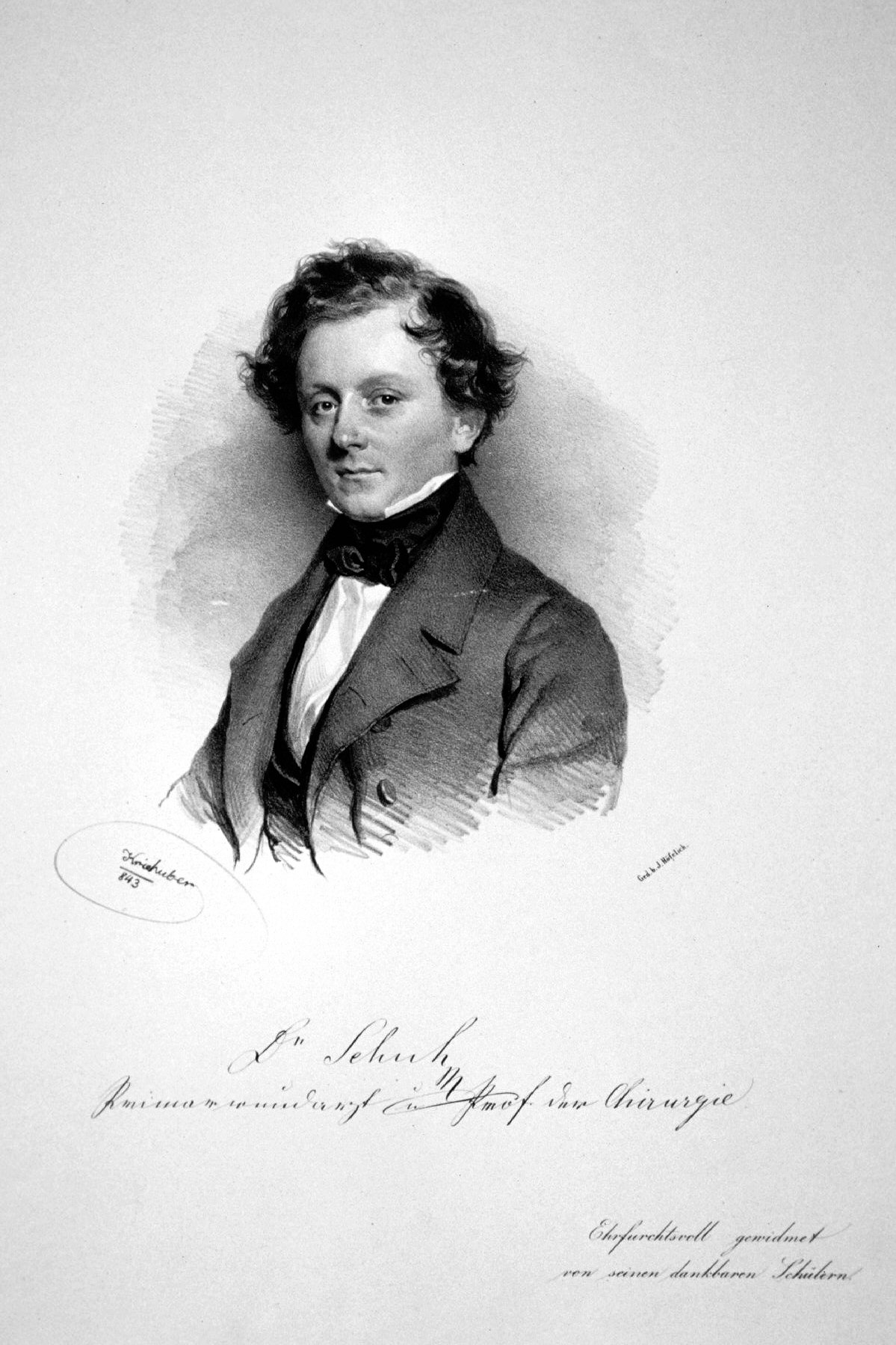
Franz Schuh in 1843

- Johann Heinrich Schmelzer (c. 1620-1680), court composer and first non-Italian court conductor at the Viennese court of Leopold I, Holy Roman Emperor
- Franz Schuh (physician) (1804-1865), physician and surgeon, first surgical procedure with ether anesthesia
- Hermann Senkowsky (1897-1965), financial expert, NSDAP official
- Andreas Buder (born 1979), ski racer
- Paul Scharner (born 1980), football player
- Marion Gröbner (born 1985), football player
- Kathrin Zettel (born 1986), ski racer
- Jonathan Schmid (born 1990), footballer
- Klaudia Tanner (born 1970), politician and Minister of Defense
