= Frédéric Labadie-Lagrave =

French physician

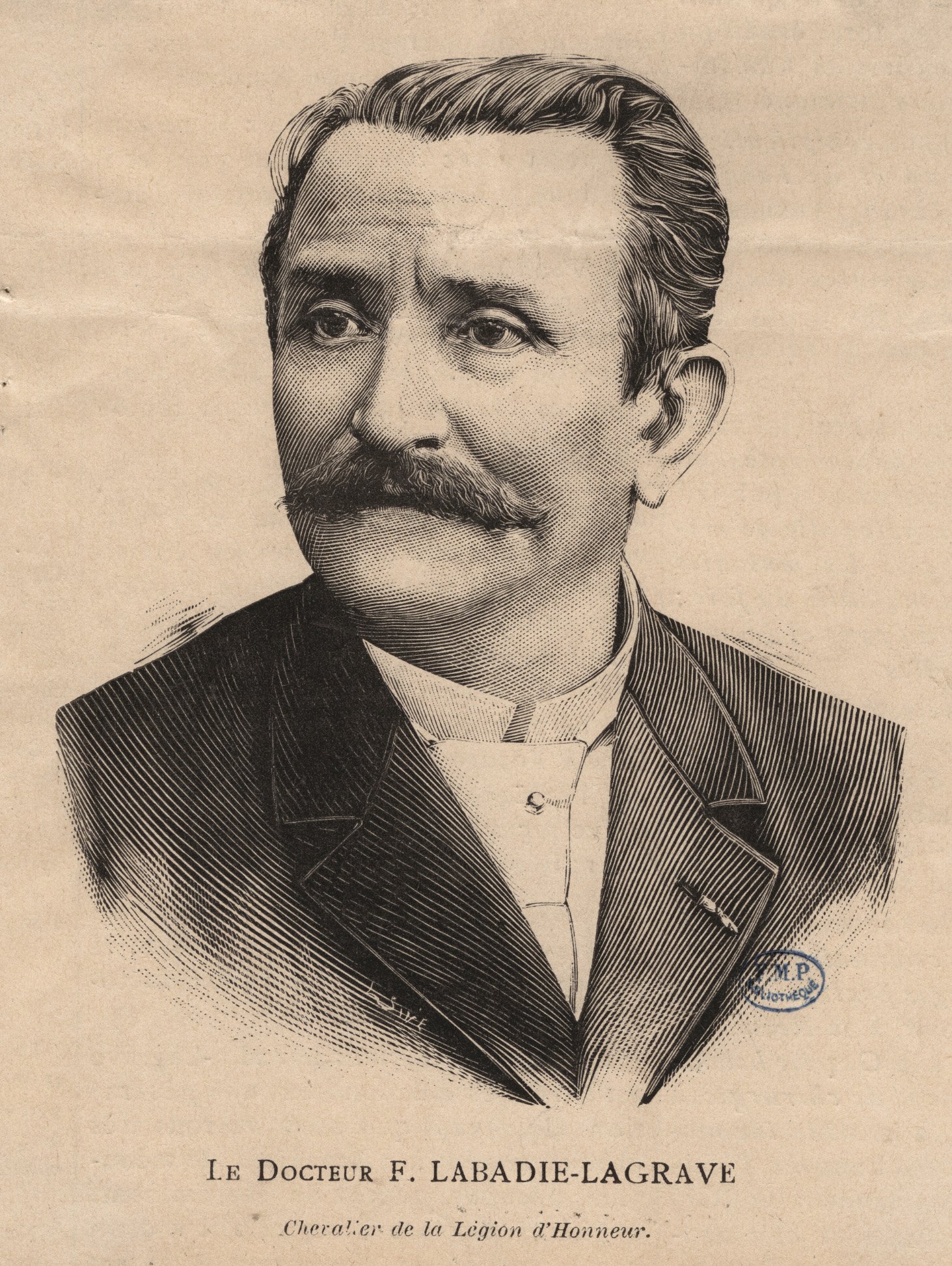
Frédéric Labadie-Lagrave

Frédéric Labadie-Lagrave (16 August 1844 – 1917) was a French physician who made important contributions to medical literature.

== Biography ==
Born at Nérac (department of Lot-et-Garonne), Labadie-Lagrave studied medicine in Paris. During the Franco-Prussian War, while still a resident, he saved a large convoy and was decorated on the battleground at Metz. He took his doctor's degree in 1873. In 1879 he became médecin des hôpitaux in Paris, practicing notably at the Charité hospital.

With Germain Sée (1818–1896), Labadie-Lagrave wrote the multi-volume Médecine clinique, to which he made extensive contributions on urology and diseases of the liver, kidneys and bile ducts. Sée's lectures on the diagnostic and treatment of heart diseases were published under his care.

With Felix Legueu (1863–1939), he published Traité médico-chirurgical de gynécologie, an influential book on medical-surgical gynecology. He also contributed numerous articles to Sigismond Jaccoud's Nouveau dictionnaire de médecine et de chirurgie pratiques (for example, articles on gout, hydrophobia, meninges, nerves).

Labadie-Lagrave translated the first American treatise about neurology, W. A. Hammond's Diseases of the nervous system, C. A. Wunderlich's pioneer German book on body temperature Das Verhalten der Eigenwärme in Krankheiten and Siegmund Rosenstein's Die Pathologie und Therapie der Nierenkrankheiten. He retired in 1909.

== Works ==
=== Lists of works ===
- An 1879 list of works
- List of works on Sudoc (27 titles, 2012-04-08)
- List of online works on Gallica (7 titles, 2012-04-08)

=== Selected works ===
- Labadie-Lagrave, Frédéric, Observations de paralysie ascendante aiguë
- Labadie-Lagrave, Frédéric (1873). Des complications cardiaques du croup et de la diphthérie et, en particulier, de l'endocardite secondaire diphtérique (8vo). Paris: F. Savy.
- Hammond, William Alexander (1879); Labadie-Lagrave, Frédéric (Translation and notes) (8vo), Traité des maladies du système nerveux : comprenant les maladies du cerveau, les maladies de la moelle et de ses enveloppes, les affections cérébro-spinales, les maladies du système nerveux périphérique et les maladies toxiques du système nerveux. Paris: J.-B. Baillière et fils. Retrieved 2012-03-30. (Translated from Hammond's Treatise on Diseases of the Nervous System)
- Labadie-Lagrave, Frédéric. Clinique thérapeutique du diabète arthritique et de son traitement (8vo). Vaucresson: Daux fils.
- Sée, Germain (1883); Labadie-Lagrave, Frédéric (Ed.) (8vo), Du diagnostic et du traitement des maladies du cœur et en particulier de leurs formes anormales, par le professeur Germain Sée, leçons recueillies par le Dr F. Labadie-Lagrave. Paris: A. Delahaye & É. Lecrosnier. Retrieved 2012-03-30
- Labadie-Lagrave, Frédéric (1888) (8vo). Urologie clinique et maladies des reins [Clinical urology and kidney diseases], p. PR3, at Google Books, coll. Médecine clinique, vol. 4, Paris: Adrien Delahaye and Émile Lecrosnier
- Labadie-Lagrave, Frédéric; Legueu, Félix (1898). Traité médico-chirurgical de gynécologie [Medico-surgical treatise of gynecology] (8vo). Paris: F. Alcan.
