= Helene Wiet =

Austrian soprano

- Born: 12 March 1871; Vienna, Austria
- Died: 1939
- Occupation: Opera singer (soprano)
- Spouse: Alfons von Rosthorn

Helene Wiet (12 March 1871 – 1939) was an Austrian opera singer who sang leading soprano roles in the theatres of the Austro-Hungarian Empire in the late 19th century. From 1895 to 1899, she was the prima donna of the Deutsches Landestheater in Prague.

== Life and career ==
Wiet was born into a middle-class family in Vienna and trained at the Vienna Conservatory where she studied singing under Luise Meyer-Dustmann and piano under Leopold Landskron. She made her stage debut in 1892 at the Municipal Theatre of Troppau. After singing in Pressburg and Brünn from 1893 to 1895, she became a member of the Deutsches Landestheater company in Prague where she sang for the next four years with great popular success. She also sang at the Vienna State Opera in 1896 as Marzelline in Fidelio.

Following Wiet's marriage in 1899 to the physician Alfons von Rosthorn, she retired from the stage and moved to Graz where he had recently been appointed as a professor at the university there. She continued to perform in concerts for several years and also trained her niece, Therese Wiet, in singing. In 1908 she moved to Vienna with her husband when he was appointed a professor at the University of Vienna. He died the following year. Helene died in 1939. The exact date and place of her death are unknown.
