= Rudolf Kaltenbach =

German gynecologist (1842–1893)

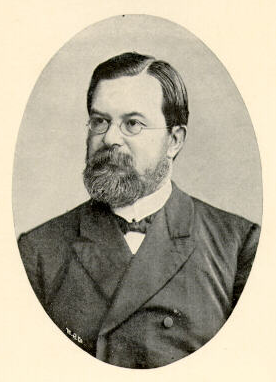
Rudolf Kaltenbach (1842–1893)

Rudolf Kaltenbach (12 May 1842 – 21 November 1893) was a German gynecologist who was a native of Freiburg im Breisgau.

In 1865 he earned his medical doctorate from the University of Vienna, and afterwards trained under Johann von Dumreicher (1815-1880) at the surgical hospital in Vienna. From 1867 to 1873 he was an assistant to Alfred Hegar (1830–1914) in Freiburg, and was later a professor of gynecology and obstetrics at the University of Giessen. In 1887 he became an OB/GYN professor at Halle, where he succeeded Robert Michaelis von Olshausen (1835–1915). Kaltenbach served in the military during the Austro-Prussian (on the Austrian side) and Franco-Prussian Wars.

Kaltenbach is remembered for his numerous medical publications, including a book on operative gynecology that he co-authored with Alfred Hegar. He is credited with introducing a gynecological graphic aid involving menstruation cycles called the Kaltenbachschema (Kaltenbach chart).

== Selected writings ==
- Operative Gynäkologie (with Alfred Hegar) 1874 – operative gynaecology
- Lehrbuch der Geburtshilfe, Stuttgart 1893 – textbook of obstetrics
