= Ludwig Bandl =

Austrian obstetrician and gynecologist

Ludwig Bandl (1 November 1842 – 26 August 1892) was an Austrian obstetrician and gynecologist born in Himberg, Niederösterreich.

In 1867 he received his medical doctorate from the University of Vienna, where he studied under Karl von Braun-Fernwald (1822–1891), Joseph Hyrtl (1810–1894), and Johann von Dumreicher (1815–1880). In 1878 he became head of the department of obstetrics at the general polyclinic in Vienna, and later on, was named an associate professor of obstetrics and gynecology (1880). Six years later, Bandl attained a full professorship at Prague, but within a matter of weeks had to resign his position due to mental illness. He spent his final years institutionalized in a Vienna asylum.

Bandl is remembered for his description of the uterine contraction ring, a constriction located at the junction of the corpus uteri and the isthmus of uterus. This structure is sometimes referred to as the "pathologic retraction ring", or as "Bandl's ring of contraction".
