= Luise Meyer-Dustmann =

German singer and music educator (1831–1899)

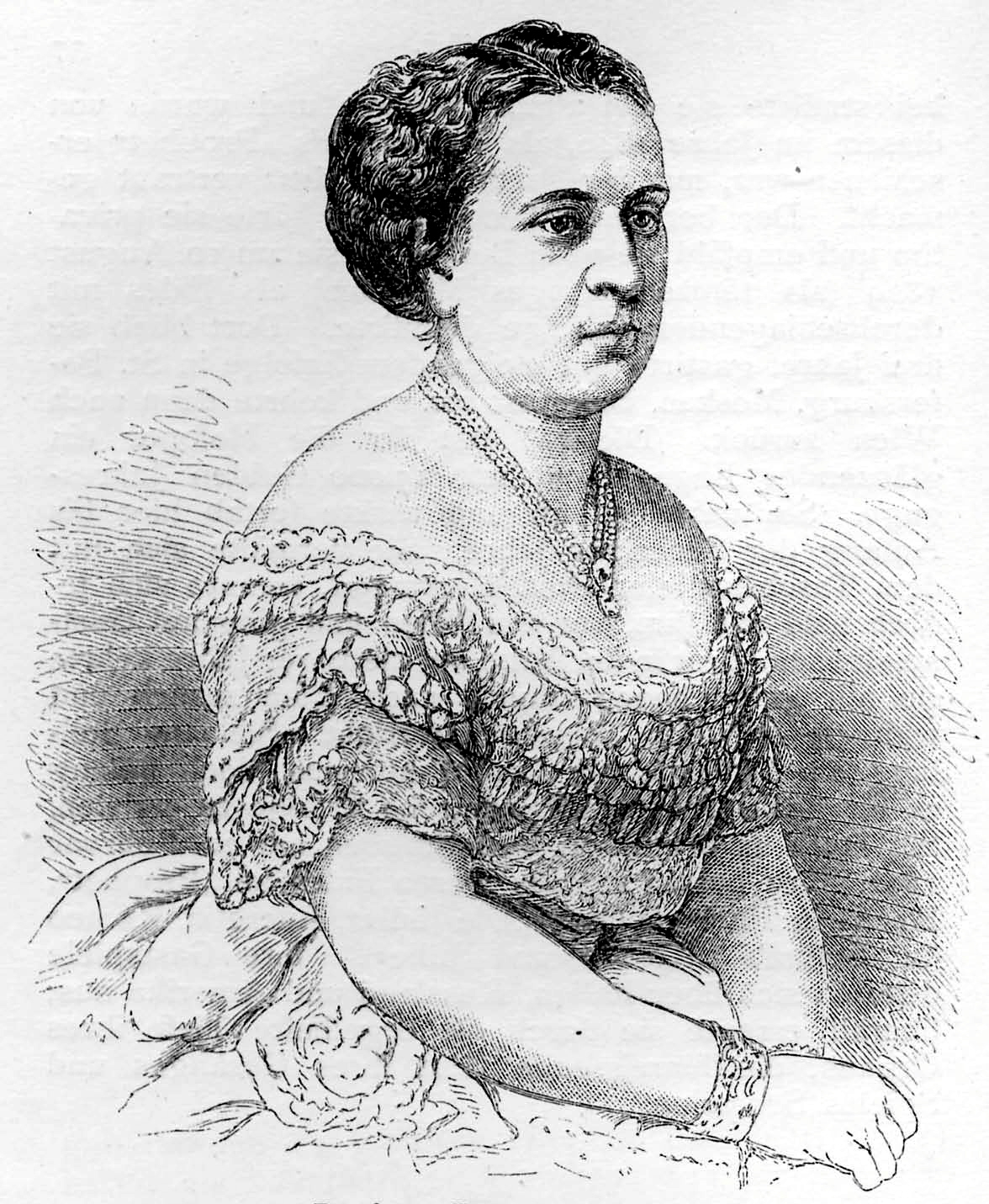
- Luise Dustmann
- Born: Marie Luise Meyer; 22 August 1831; Aachen, Germany
- Died: 2 March 1899 (aged 67); Berlin-Charlottenburg, Germany
- Occupations: Opera singer Lieder singer
- Spouse: Adalbert Dustmann
- Parent(s): Friedrich August Meyer; Anna Maria Absenger

Luise Meyer-Dustmann (born Luise Meyer: 22 August 1831 – 2 March 1899) was a German opera singer (soprano), and singing teacher.

== Life ==
Marie Luise Meyer was born in Aachen where her father, Friedrich August Meyer, worked as a theatre inspector. He had recently married her mother, born Anna Maria Absenger, who was a stage singer. Luise had a younger sister, Marie Meyer (1840–1908) who went on to become a stage actress.

She received her first musical education from her mother, who by this time was working as a soubrette in Breslau (now Wrocław). When she was 17 she moved to Vienna to receive further lessons in singing and stagecraft. Here, according to a biographical article in the Illustrirte Zeitung, she had to "battle with many difficulties during the [brief but bloody] October uprising of 1848". Tantalisingly, the writer does not elaborate.

She made her stage debut in the 1848–49 season at the Theater in der Josefstadt under the direction of the multi-talented Kapellmeister Albert Lortzing. After a time she left Vienna and joined her parents who were still working in Breslau. Here she took work at the Oper Breslau.. She was engaged during 1850 and 1851 as a stage singer at the Court Theatre in Kassel where she enjoyed great success as the company's lead soprano under the musical direction of Louis Spohr. Her reputation established, she was now able to broaden her horizons, touring theatres in various principal north German cities giving a succession of well applauded guest performances, notably in Braunschweig and Hamburg. In 1852 Luise Meyer switched to the Königliches Hoftheater Dresden in Dresden, remaining under contract there till 1854. However, she was not well accepted by the theatre community in Dresden, and was happy to accept an invitation to move to Prague where she quickly became a favourite with audiences.

From Prague she was able to travel and make a number of guest appearances elsewhere, notably in Stuttgart, Strasbourg and back in Vienna itself. During July 1856 she undertook a succession of guest performances at Vienna. She featured there in the first Vienna performances of Les Huguenots. Positive press reviews and public reactions adumbrated her future as the leading soprano of the Imperial Court Opera. During this time she came to the notice of the Archduke Franz Karl who instructed that she should be invited to join the Court Opera. She was enrolled into the company on 1 January 1857.

In 1858 she married Adalbert Dustmann, a Vienna book seller. In 1860 she became an imperial Kammersängerin, an important but largely honorific appointment. Her voice had developed into a powerful precise soprano one, with a good range and a particular pleasing euphony in the middle register. Her intonation was accurate and confident. Her natural gifts, backed by diligent and intense study, matched with a deep sensitivity to the true artistic potential of her various stage roles, made her well suited to portray leading characters, including Norma, Jessonda, Amalie in Un ballo in maschera, Valentine in Les Huguenots, Mathilde in William Tell. By 1875 she had been seen and heard by an appreciative Viennese audience in almost all the important lead soprano roles of the time. That year she ended her full-time stage career in the role of Elsa von Brabant in Lohengrin. There were, however, further guest appearances as Amalie in Un ballo in maschera in Court Opera productions in 1877 and 1881.

Alongside the operas of Christoph Willibald Gluck, Wolfgang Amadeus Mozart and Carl Maria von Weber, Meyer-Dustmann returned again and again to the operas of Richard Wagner. There was evidently great mutual respect. When he was considering her for the Isolde role in the first Karlsruhe production of Tristan und Isolde, the composer told his wife, Minna, that Meyer-Dustmann had a "beautiful soulful voice, capable of anything [as well as] an excellent dramatic delivery", and a great range of nuance.

By the time she retired from the stage, Meyer-Dustmann had also built up a parallel career as a Lieder singer, with a particular focus on the songs of Felix Mendelssohn and Schubert. On 5 January 1870, together with contralto Rosa Girzick, tenor Gustav Walter and baritone Emil Krauss, she gave the first public performance of the Brahms' Liebeslieder Walzer. The piano duet accompaniment was provided by the composer and Clara Schumann.

After 1875 she took a teaching position with the conservatory at the city's Society of Friends of Music. Notable pupils included Lola Beeth, Hedwig Hübsch, Ida Krzyzanowski-Doxat, and Helene Wiet. She gave up her teaching role in Vienna in 1880 when, with her husband, she relocated to Berlin Charlottenburg. Here she lived out the rest of her life.
