= Bernhard Seyfert =

Bernhard Seyfert (19 April 1817 in Drum, a town in northern Bohemia – 7 May 1870) was an Austrian obstetrician and gynecologist.

In 1844 he earned his medical degree from Charles University in Prague, spending the next two years as a secondary hospital physician. From 1847 he worked as an assistant to Antonín Jan Jungmann (1775-1854) and later Franz Kiwisch von Rotterau (1814-1852) at the Prague maternity hospital. In 1854 became a full professor and director of the obstetrics and gynecology hospital in Prague.

Seyfert made contributions in his investigations of chronic metritis. Although not known for his literary work, he was considered an excellent instructor by his students. Many of his writings (e.g. the narrow pelvis, inflections of the uterus, on hematometra, et al.) were articles published in the Prague Quarterly journal.
