= Félix Legueu =

French urologist and gynecologist

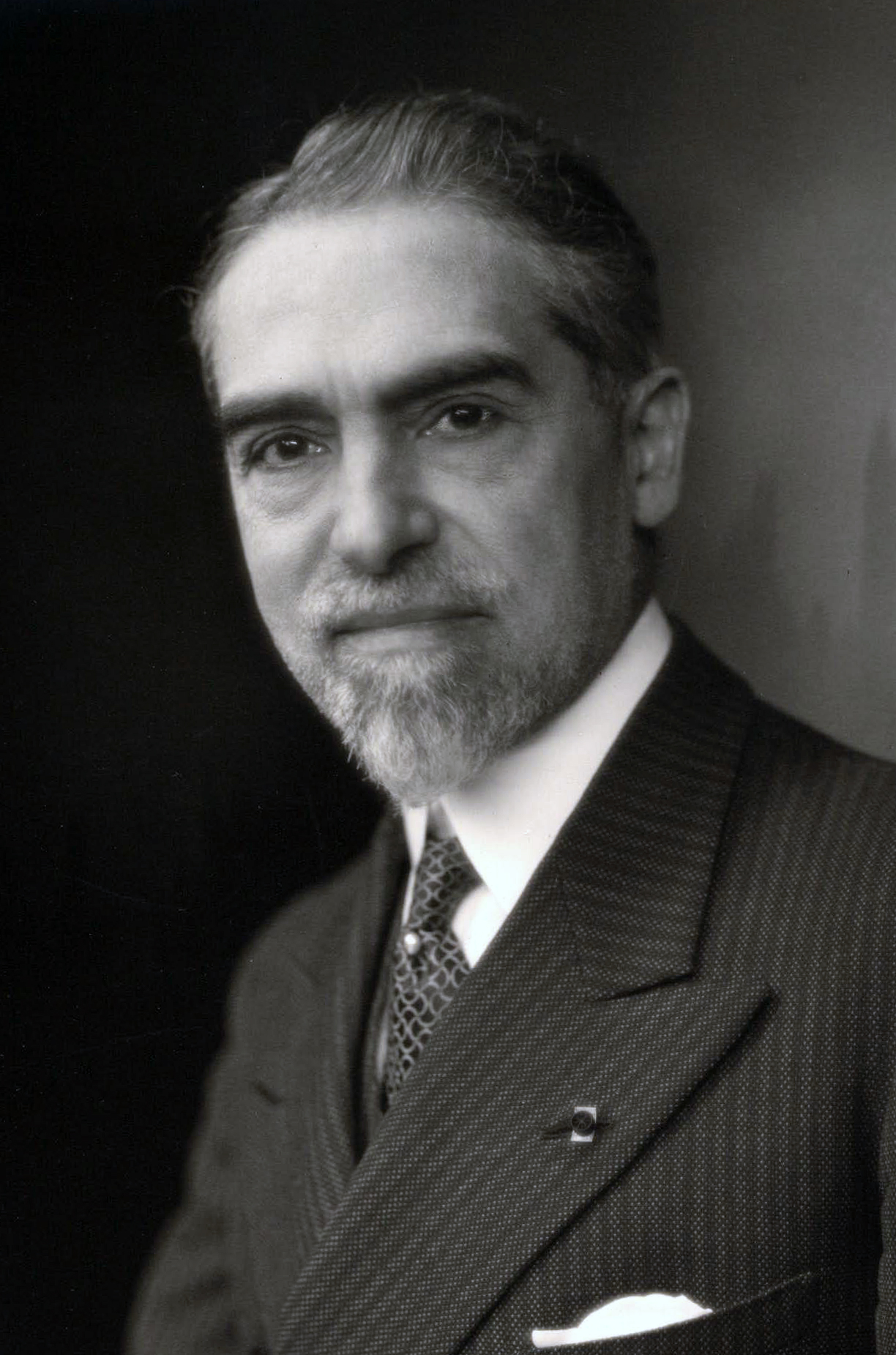
Félix Legueu (1863–1939)

Félix Legueu (12 August 1863 – 2 October 1939) was a French urologist and gynecologist born in Angers.

== Biography ==
Legueu was a clinical professor in Paris, a surgeon at Hôpital Necker and a member of the Académie de Médecine.

He specialized in genitourinary disorders. In 1913 he described a procedure for the closure of a vesicovaginal fistula, an abnormal passageway between the bladder and the vagina. That operation, today called the "Dittel-Forgue-Legueu operation", is also named after Drs. Leopold von Dittel (1815–1898) and Émile Forgue (1860–1943).

A few surgical instruments bear Legueu's name, such as the "Legueu bladder retractor" and the "Legueu bladder spatula".

Legueu died in his home from carbon monoxide poisoning.

== Works ==
=== Lists of works ===
- The most recent lists by Legueu himself are:
  - Titres et travaux scientifiques de Félix Legueu. Paris: F. Alcan. 1912. OCLC 493981300.
  - Supplément aux titres scientifiques depuis 1920. 1924. OCLC 493858235. total pages 7 (typewritten).
- Contemporary (but incomplete) list on SUDOC; 35 titles as an author (Retrieved 2012-03-28).

=== Selected works ===
- Des calculs du rein et de l'uretère au point de vue chirurgical, Steinheil. 1891, 150 p. Also online on Google Books
- Legueu, Félix (May 1897). De l'appendicite: pathogénie, clinique, traitement (8vo). L’œuvre médico-chirurgicale. Vol. 1. Paris: Masson et Cie. total pages 40 + 8.
- (With Frédéric Labadie-Lagrave) Traité médico-chirurgical de gynécologie. 1898
- Traitement de l'appendicite. L’œuvre médico-chirurgical (in French). Vol. 18. Paris: Masson et Cie. July 1899. total pages 32 (8vo).
- Legueu, Félix (1899). Des hématuries essentielles (Rapport présenté à la 4e session de l'Association française d'urologie) (8vo). Paris: Daix frères. total pages 70.
- Leçons de clinique chirurgicale, Paris: Félix Alcan. 1902, 454 p.
- De la pyélonéphrite dans ses rapports avec la puerpéralité. Vol. IVe Congrès périodique de gynécologie, d'obstétrique et de paediatrie. Rouen: Lecerf fils. 1904. total pages 32.
- Traitement chirurgical de l'hypertrophie prostatique (8vo). Vol. Rapport présenté au XV^{e} Congrès international de Lisbonne. Paris: G. Steinheil. April 1906. total pages 62.
- Legueu, Félix (1908). Traitement du cancer de l'appareil urinaire et des organes génitaux de l'homme, résultats éloignés (8vo). Brussels: de Hayez. total pages 22.
- Traité chirurgical d'urologie. Paris: F. Alcan. 1910. OCLC 490529057. total pages VI-1382. (with a foreword by Jean Casimir Félix Guyon).
- (With Edmond Papin and G. Maingot) Exploration radiographique de l'appareil urinaire, 1913
- Legueu, F. (Oct 1918). "Repair of urethral defects by tubular grafts of vaginal mucosa". The Journal of Urology. 2 (5): 369–377. doi:10.1016/S0022-5347(17)74213-9. ISSN 0022-5347. OCLC 494030635.
- Cliniques de Necker
1. Cliniques de Necker: 1912–1916, A. Maloine et fils. 1917, 378 p.
2. Cliniques de Necker: 1918–1921, A. Maloine et fils. 1922
- (With Pierre Truchot and Bernard Fey) La pyéloscopie, Éditions médicales Norbert Maloine, Clinique urologique de Necker. 1927, 112 p.
- (With Edmond Papin) Précis d'urologie, Maloine. 1937

== Bibliography ==
- La clinique urologique de Necker, 1912–1933 (Professeur Félix Legueu). Paris: Masson. 1933. OCLC 493332891. pages 307 (8vo). (Written by former colleagues)
- Fischer, I. Biographisches Lexikon der hervorragenden Ärzte der letzten fünfzig Jahre (in German). Vol. 2. Berlin: Urban & Schwarzenberg.
