= Franz Schuh (physician) =

Austrian physician (1804–1865)

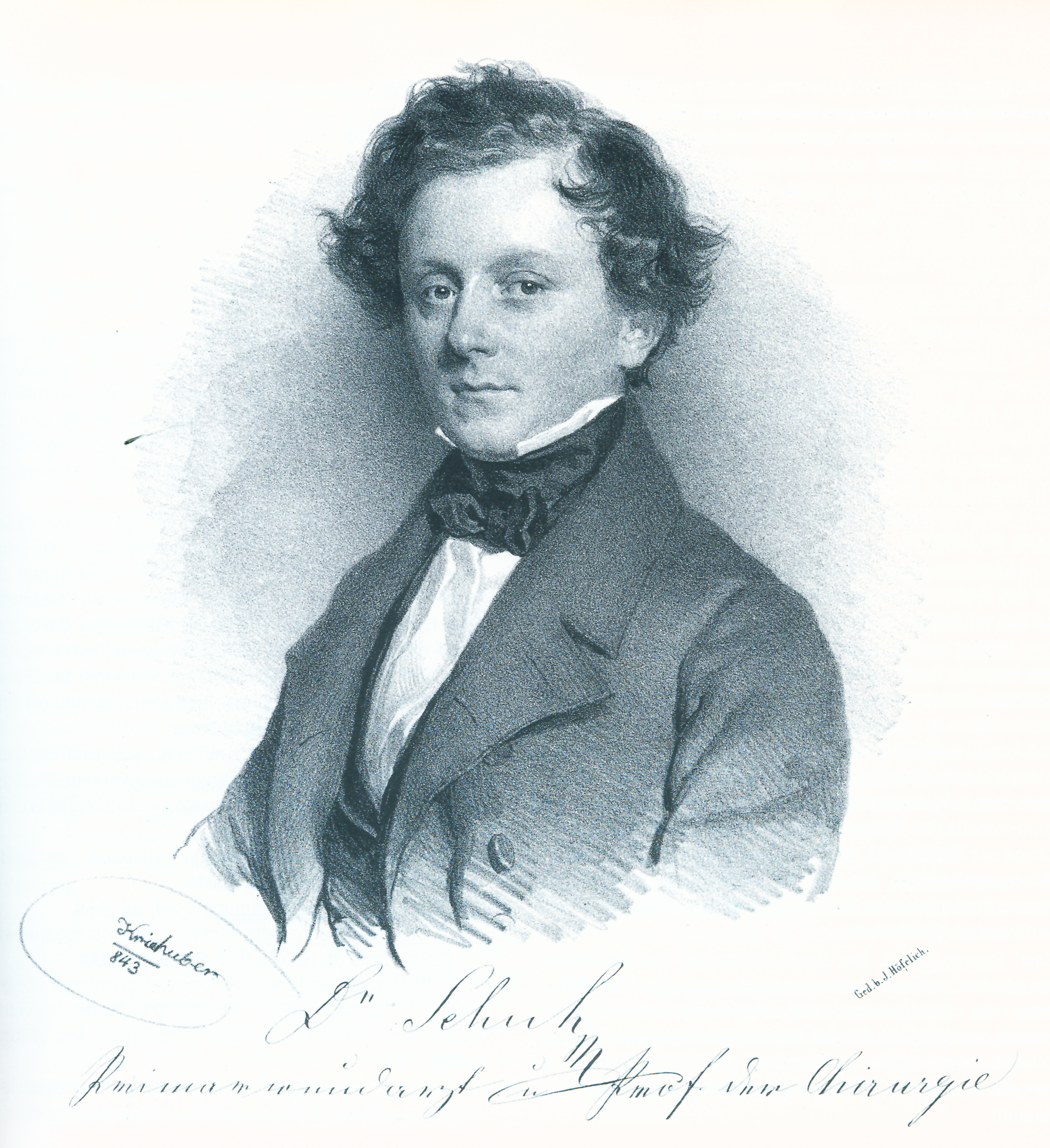
Franz Schuh

Franz Schuh (17 October 1804, Scheibbs, Scheibbs District, Lower Austria – 22 December 1865) was an Austrian Empire pathologist and surgeon who was a native of Scheibbs.

In 1831 he obtained his medical doctorate in Vienna, afterwards serving as an assistant to Joseph Wattmann (1789–1866). In 1836 he worked as a professor at the Lyceum in Salzburg, returning to Vienna the following year as primary surgeon at the general hospital. In 1841 he became an associate professor in Vienna, where in 1842, he was appointed head of the second surgical clinic.

In Vienna, he was a colleague of physician Joseph Škoda (1805–1881), and an instructor to Austrian-American dermapathologist Carl Heitzmann (1836–1896). He died in December 1865 from a malignant fever and blood poisoning, possibly due to a septic infection.

Franz Schuh was a medical pioneer who advanced scientific surgical practices in Vienna. He is remembered for his pathophysiological research and his investigations of new surgical methods. In 1840 he is credited with performing the first successful pericardiocentesis (pericardiac aspiration), and in January 1847, he was the first Austrian physician to use ether as an anesthetic on a human patient.

In 1906, the thoroughfare Franz-Schuh-Gasse in the Favoriten district of Vienna was named in his honor.

== Selected writings ==
- Pathologie und Therapie der Pseudoplasmen (Pathology and therapy of the "pseudo plasmas"), 1854
- Abhandlungen auf dem Gebiet der Chirurgie und Operationslehre, (Articles of surgery and operative lessons), 1867.
