= Bandl's ring =

Uterine malformation

Bandl's ring (also known as pathological retraction ring) is the abnormal junction between the two segments of the uterus; it is a late sign associated with obstructed labor. Prior to the onset of labor, the junction between the lower and upper uterine segments is a slightly thickened ring. In abnormal and obstructed labors, after the cervix has reached full dilatation, further contractions cause the upper uterine segment muscle fibers' myometrium to shorten, so that the actively contracting upper segment becomes thicker and shorter. The ridge of the pathological Bandl's ring can be felt or seen rising as far up as the umbilicus. The lower segment becomes stretched and thinner and, if neglected, may lead to uterine rupture. It is a major pathology behind obstructed labor. A circular groove encircling the uterus is formed between the active upper segment and the distended lower segment. Due to pronounced retraction, there is fetal jeopardy or even death. It was first described by Ludwig Bandl, an Austrian obstetrician.

Bandl's ring is rare. Once identified, delivery is typically done by Caesarean section. Bandl's ring may also not be identified during labor and only observed upon surgical intervention.
