= Émile Forgue =

French surgeon (1860–1943)

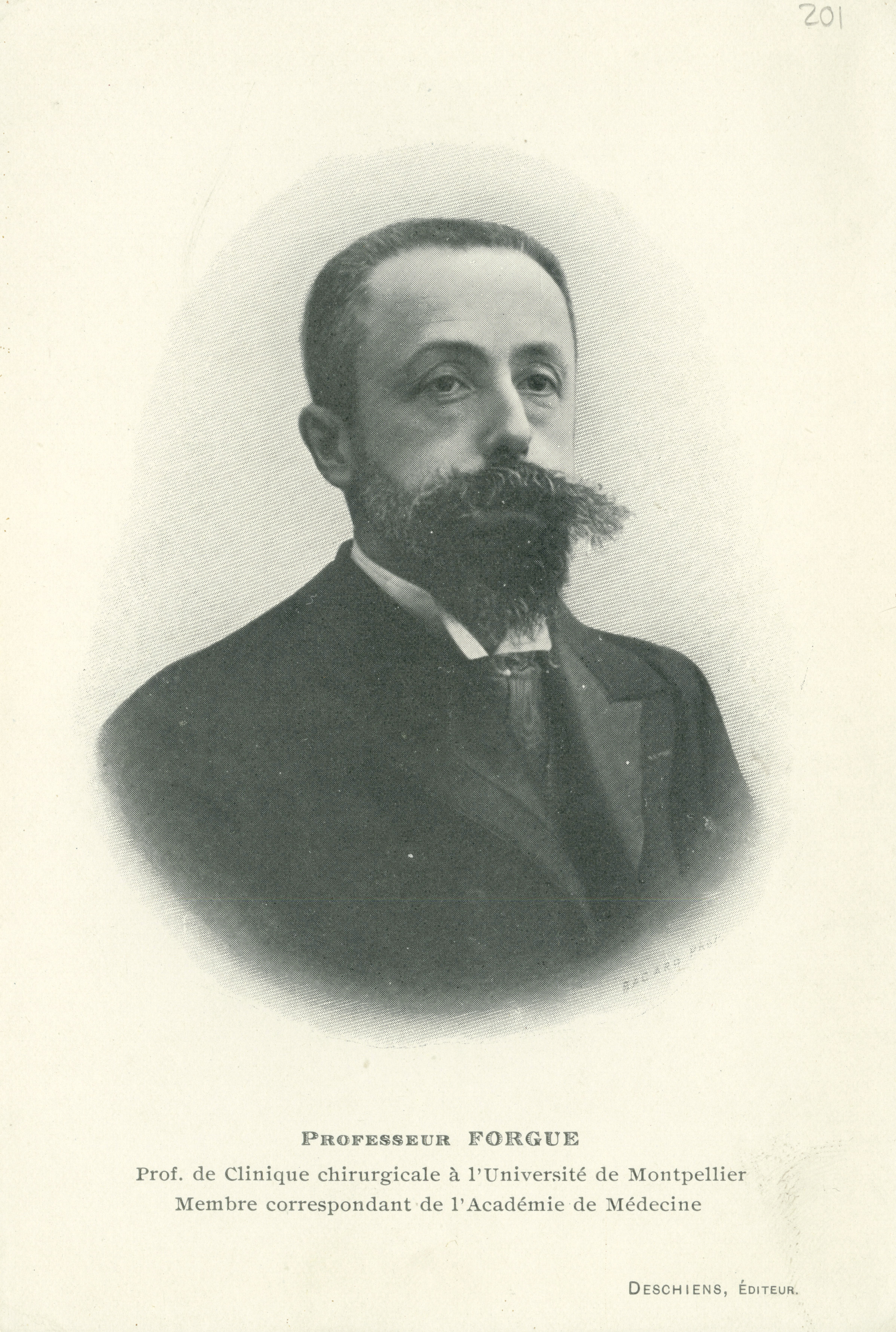
- Born: 29 December 1860; Briançon, France
- Died: 1 February 1943 (aged 82); Mirepoix, France

Émile Auguste Forgue (29 December 1860 – 1 February 1943) was a French surgeon.

In 1893 he received his medical doctorate from the University of Montpellier with the thesis Distribution des racines motrices dans les muscles des membres. In 1896 he obtained his agrégation for surgery, and later on, became a professor of operative medicine (1891–1930) and clinical surgery (from 1895) at Montpellier. In 1899 he became a correspondent member of the Académie de Médecine. In 1924 he was appointed director of the Centre anticancéreux de Montpellier.

With urologists Leopold Ritter von Dittel and Felix Legueu, the "Dittel-Forgue-Legueu operation" is named, a procedure used for closure of vesicovaginal fistulae.

== Selected works ==
- Traité de thérapeutique chirurgicale, 1892 (with Paul Reclus) – Treatise of surgical therapy.
- Guide pratique du médecin dans les accidents du travail, suites médicales et judiciaires, 1905 – Practical guide for the physician in regards to occupational accidents, medical and legal actions.
- Le diverticule de Meckel (appendice de l'iléon) son rôle dans la pathologie et la thérapeutique abdominales, 1907 – Meckel's diverticulum (appendice of the ileum) its role in pathology and abdominal therapy.
- Précis de pathologie externe, 1908 – Specifics of external pathology.
- Gynécologie, 1916 – Gynaecology.
- Théophraste Renaudot, créateur du journalisme en France : une grande figure de l'école médicale de Montpellier, 1927 – Théophraste Renaudot, creator of journalism in France: a great figure of the medical school of Montpellier.
- La rachianesthésie, sa valeur et sa place actuelle dans la pratique, 1930 – Spinal anaesthesia, its value and its present place in practice.
- Précis d'anesthésie chirurgicale; anesthésies générale, rachidienne, locale, 1934 – Precise surgical anesthesia; general anesthesia, spinal, local.
- Les pestiférés de Saint-Jean d'Acre et de Jaffa : un épisode de la vie de Desgenettes : expédition d'Egypte, 1938 – The plague of Saint-Jean d'Acre and Jaffa: an episode in the life of René-Nicolas Dufriche Desgenettes: Egyptian expedition.
- Les "pièges" de la chirurgie en diagnostic et thérapeutique; erreurs et fautes ou faits présumés tels, conditions et limites de la responsabilité, 1939 – The caveats of diagnostic and therapeutic surgery; errors, mistakes or presumptions, conditions and limits of liability.
