= Rudolf Chrobak =

Austrian gynecologist (1843–1910)

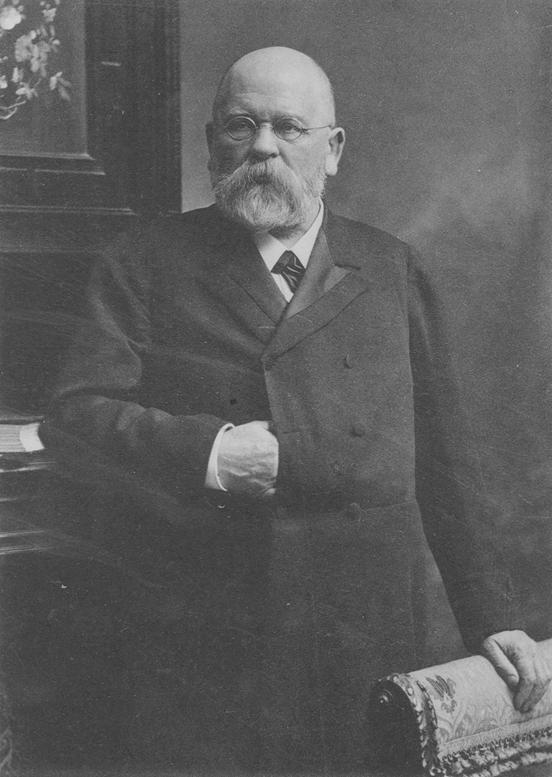
- Rudolf Chrobak (1843–1910)
- Born: 8 July 1843; Troppau, Austrian Silesia
- Died: 1 October 1910 (aged 67); Vienna, Austria-Hungary
- Education: University of Vienna
- Scientific career
- Fields: Gynecology

Rudolf Chrobak (8 July 1843 – 1 October 1910) was an Austrian gynecologist who was a native of Troppau, Austrian Silesia.

In 1866 he received his medical doctorate from the University of Vienna, and worked as an intern at Vienna General Hospital and as an assistant in the clinic of Johann von Oppolzer (1808–1871). In 1880 he became an associate professor, and in 1889 succeeded August Breisky (1832-1889) as professor and director of the second Frauenklinik in Vienna. Chrobak maintained this position until his retirement in 1908. With Friedrich Schauta (1849–1919), he was responsible for the planning and design of the new hospital department for gynecology in Vienna.

== Associated eponyms ==
- Chrobak's operation: Supravaginal amputation of the uterus.
- Otto–Chrobak pelvis: Protrusion of the acetabulum into the pelvic cavity. Named along with German anatomist Adolph Wilhelm Otto (1786–1845).

== Selected publications ==
- Die mikroskopische Anatomie des Uterus, (Microscopic anatomy of the uterus) In: Salomon Stricker's "Handbuch der Lehre von den Geweben des Menschen und der Thiere" (1871-1873).
- Ueber bewegliche Niere und Hysterie.
- Die Erkrankungen der weiblichen Geschlechtsorgane (with Alfons von Rosthorn 1857-1909), two volumes 1896/1906. Included in "Handbuch der speciellen Pathologie und Therapie" by Carl Wilhelm Hermann Nothnagel (1841-1905).
- Untersuchungsmethoden und Gynäkologische Therapie, In: Pitha-Billroth- "Handbuch der Frauenkrankheiten".
