= Alfons von Rosthorn =

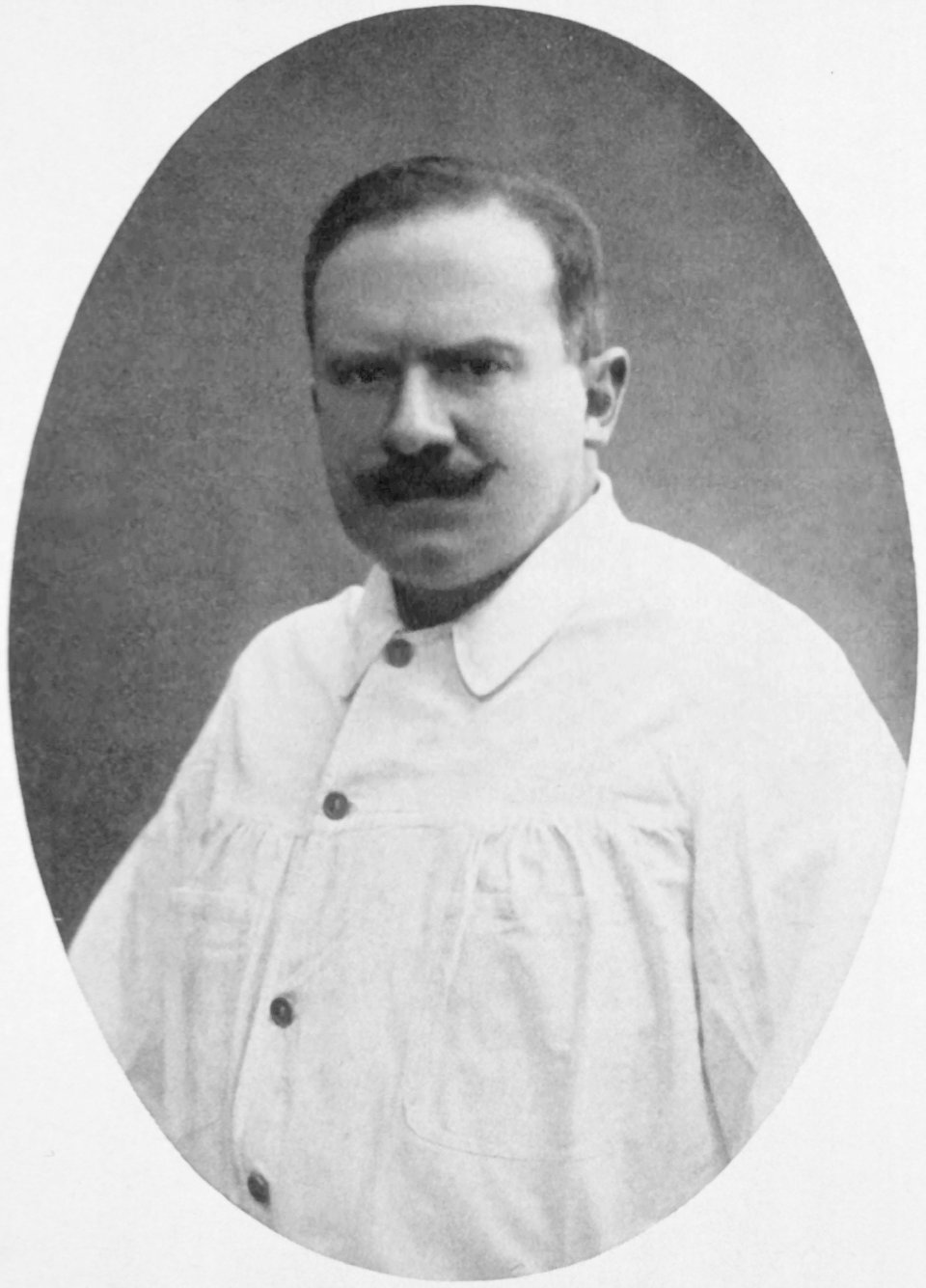
Alfons von Rosthorn.

Alfons Edler von Rosthorn (19 September 1857 – 9 August 1909) was a gynecologist in Austria-Hungary who was native of Oed, a village that is located in the district of Wiener Neustadt-Land.

In 1885 he earned his doctorate from the University of Vienna, where he studied zoology and medicine, and was a student of surgeon Theodor Billroth (1829-1894). Afterwards, he became an assistant to Rudolf Chrobak (1843-1910) at the second university Frauenklinik in Vienna. In 1891 he was habilitated for gynecology and obstetrics, and in 1894 became a full professor of OB/GYN at the University of Prague. Later, he was a professor at the Universities of Graz (from 1899), Heidelberg (from 1902) and Vienna (from 1908).

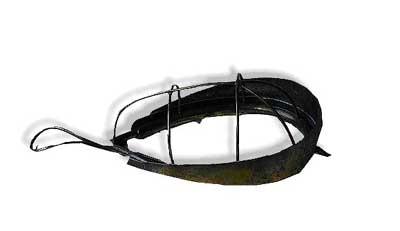
Rosthorn mask.

Rosthorn was the author of numerous works involving gynecological disorders. His better known publications were a treatise on pelvic tissue diseases called Die Krankheiten des Beckenbindegewebes, and an 1896 work on diseases of the female sex organs titled Die Erkrankungen der weiblichen Geschlechtsorgane, the latter being co-authored with Rudolf Chrobak. Rosthorn is credited with the design of a specialized mask for application of chloroform anesthesia.

Rostorn's wife was the opera singer Helene Wiet whom he married in 1899.
