= Kraurosis vulvae =

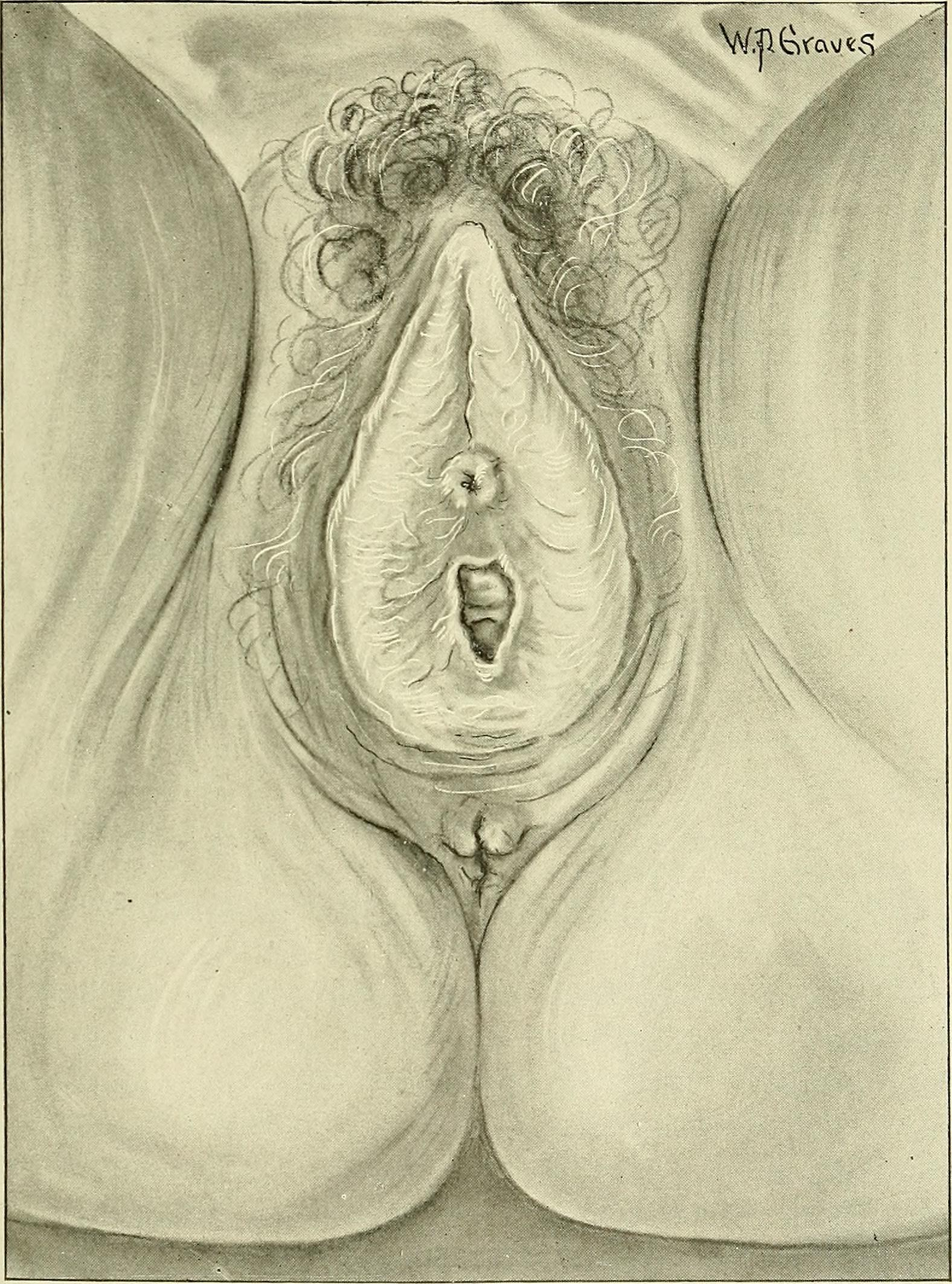
- Specialty: Urology

Kraurosis vulvae or vulvar lichen sclerosus (VLS) is a cutaneous condition characterized by atrophy and shrinkage of the skin of the vagina and vulva often accompanied by a chronic inflammatory reaction in the deeper tissues.

== See also ==
- Lichen sclerosus
- Balanitis xerotica obliterans
- List of cutaneous conditions
