= Stvolínky =

- Municipality
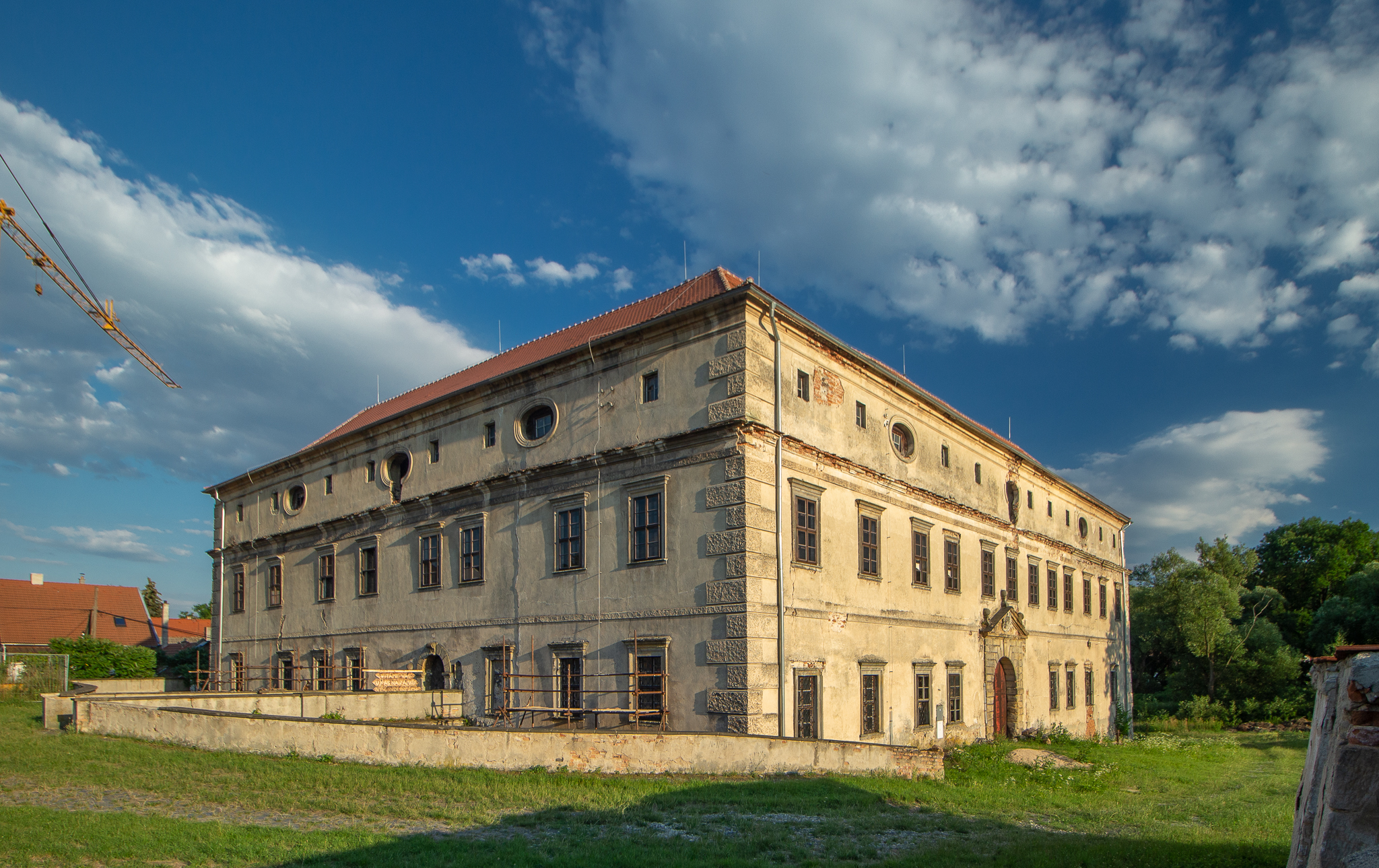
- Stvolínky Castle

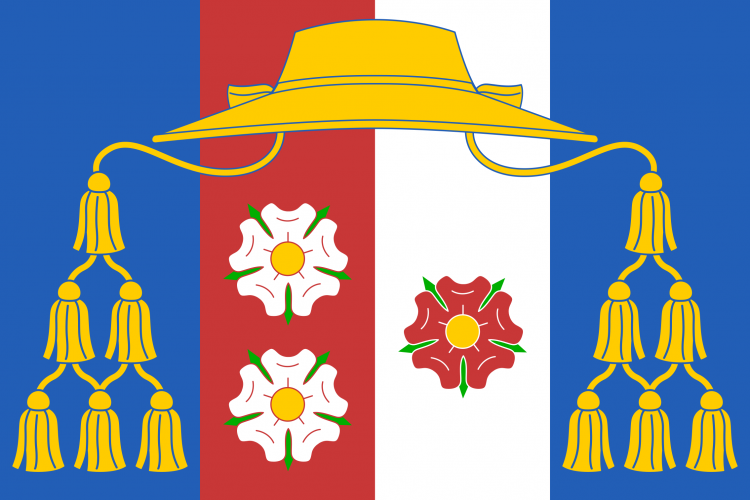
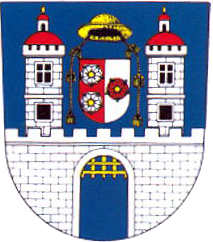
- Flag Coat of arms

- Location in the Czech Republic
- Coordinates: 50°37′56″N 14°25′43″E
- Country: Czech Republic
- Region: Liberec
- District: Česká Lípa
- First mentioned: 1197

Area
  - Total: 12.64 km^{2} (4.88 sq mi)
- Elevation: 289 m (948 ft)

Population (2026-01-01)
  - Total: 342
  - Density: 27.1/km^{2} (70.1/sq mi)
- Time zone: UTC+1 (CET)
  - Summer (DST): UTC+2 (CEST)
- Postal codes: 470 01, 470 02, 471 02
- Website: www.obec-stvolinky.cz

Stvolínky (German: Drum) is a municipality and village in Česká Lípa District in the Liberec Region of the Czech Republic. It has about 300 inhabitants.

== Administrative division ==
Stvolínky consists of five municipal parts (in brackets population according to the 2021 census):

- Stvolínky (273)
- Kolné (10)
- Novina (0)
- Stvolínecké Petrovice (1)
- Taneček (27)

== Etymology ==
The initial name of Stvolínky was Stvolenec. The name was derived from the Old Czech word stvol, which referred to some specific plant, and the adjective stvolený, referring to a place where this plant grew.

== Geography ==
Stvolínky is located about 9 kilometres (6 mi) southwest of Česká Lípa and 27 km (17 mi) east of Ústí nad Labem. The southern part of the municipal territory lies in the Ralsko Uplands, the northern part lies in the Central Bohemian Uplands. It extends into the České středohoří Protected Landscape Area in the north and into the Kokořínsko – Máchův kraj Protected Landscape Area in the south. The northern part includes the highest point of Stvolínky at 570 m (1,870 ft) above sea level. The southern part is rich is fishponds. The stream Bobří potok flows through the municipality.

== History ==
The first written mention of Stvolínky is from 1197 when Hroznata of Ovenec, the founder of the Teplá Abbey, donated the village to some named Zdeslav and his brothers. From 1358, the village was owned by the small noble family of Lords of Klučov. During their rule, a Gothic fortress with a walled courtyard, surrounded by a 10 to 12 metre wide moat, was built on the site of the lord's court. After the Ronov Castle was built at the end of the 14th century, Stvolínky became part of the Ronov estate. During the Hussite Wars, the village and the fortress were burned down by the Lusatian army.

In the late 1430s, the estate was acquired by Vilém of Ilburk. In 1505, Stvolínky was promoted to a market town. The records of that time mention the restored fortress, rebuilt into a Renaissance castle in 1520–1538 by Anežka of Halfenštejn, the wife of Vilém II of Ilburk.

In 1609, a municipal hospital was built in Stvolínky. Cardinal Ernst Adalbert of Harrach bought Stvolínky in 1647 and made the local castle the summer seat of the bishopric in Litoměřice. In 1680, local subjects raided the castle during a peasant uprising, which was quickly suppressed by General Harant, who was summoned. At the end of the 17th century, Bishop Jaroslav of Šternberk granted the market town a coat of arms and confirmed market privileges. Stvolínky were owned by the Litoměřice bishops until the establishment of a sovereign municipality in 1850.

From 1938 to 1945, Stvolínky was annexed by Nazi Germany and administered as part of the Reichsgau Sudetenland. After World War II, the German-speaking population was expelled and the municipality was partially resettled by Czechs. The municipality lost its market town title.

== Demographics ==
Historical population

Year	Pop.	±%
1869	1,194	—
1880	1,119	−6.3%
1890	980	−12.4%
1900	951	−3.0%
1910	895	−5.9%

Year	Pop.	±%
1921	820	−8.4%
1930	893	+8.9%
1950	495	−44.6%
1961	439	−11.3%
1970	354	−19.4%

Year	Pop.	±%
1980	277	−21.8%
1991	217	−21.7%
2001	289	+33.2%
2011	310	+7.3%
2021	311	+0.3%

Source: Censuses

== Transport ==
The I/15 road from Česká Lípa to Litoměřice runs through the municipality.

Stvolínky lies on the railway line heading from Česká Lípa to Postoloprty.

== Sights ==
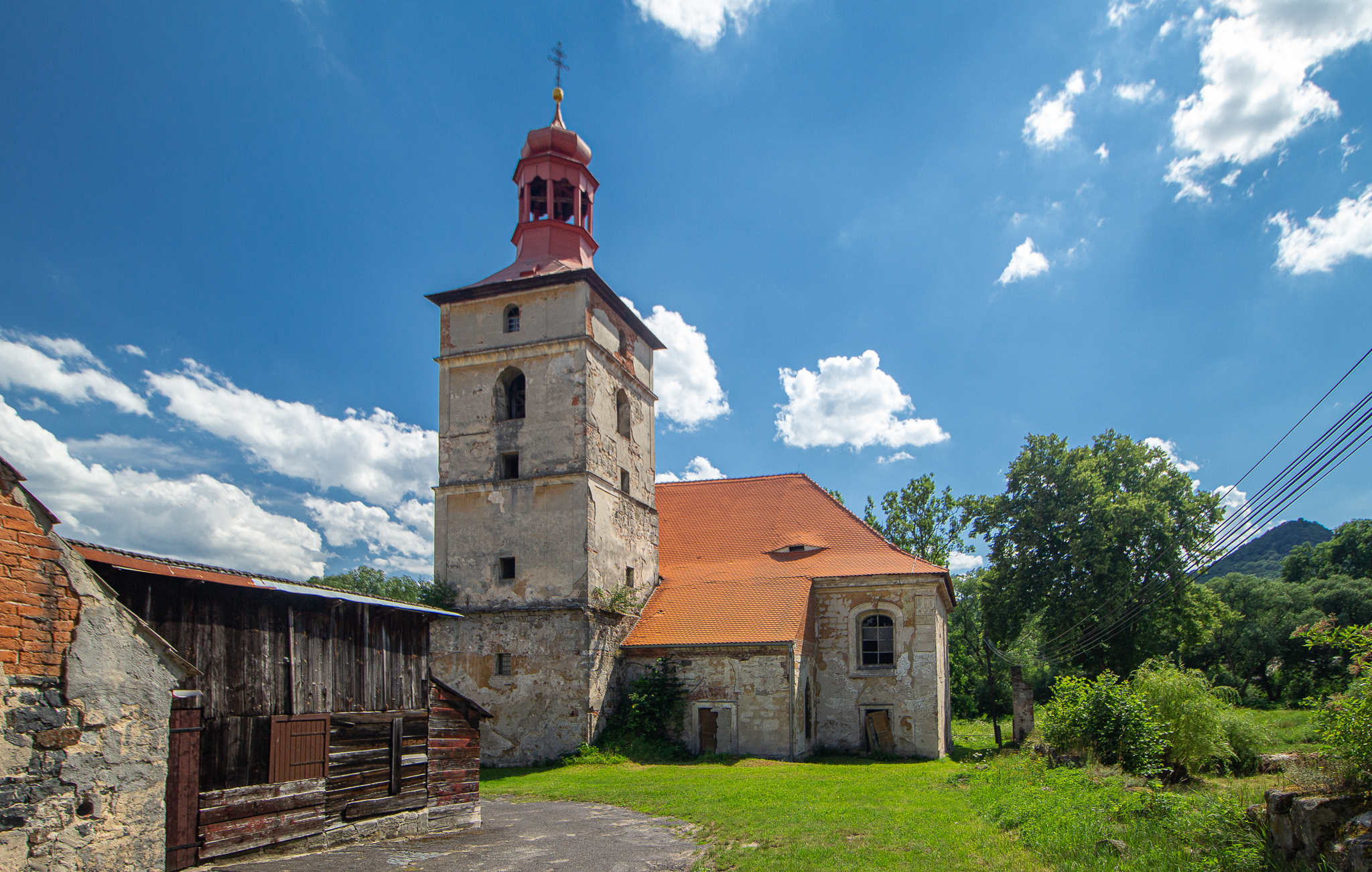
Church of All Saints

The Stvolínky Castle was rebuilt into its current early Baroque form in the 1660s. The bishops had built here a large garden with a fountain. During the rule of Emanuel Arnošt of Waldstein between 1760 and 1789, Rococo modifications were made. From 1999, The castle is owned by the municipality, which is looking for a use for it. On exceptional occasions it is opened to the public for cultural purposes.

Among the main landmarks of Stvolínky is the Church of All Saints. It was first mentioned in the 14th century. The church with a Gothic core and a Renaissance tower was rebuilt in the Empire style in 1811. Further modifications were made in 1883. In the basement of the church is the tomb of some owners of the estate; other owners have their tombstones on the church wall.

The Chapel of Saint Justin was built in the third quarter of the 16th century. It is a cemetery chapel with a Renaissance core. In 1725, it was rebuilt into its present Baroque form.
