= Paul Diepgen =

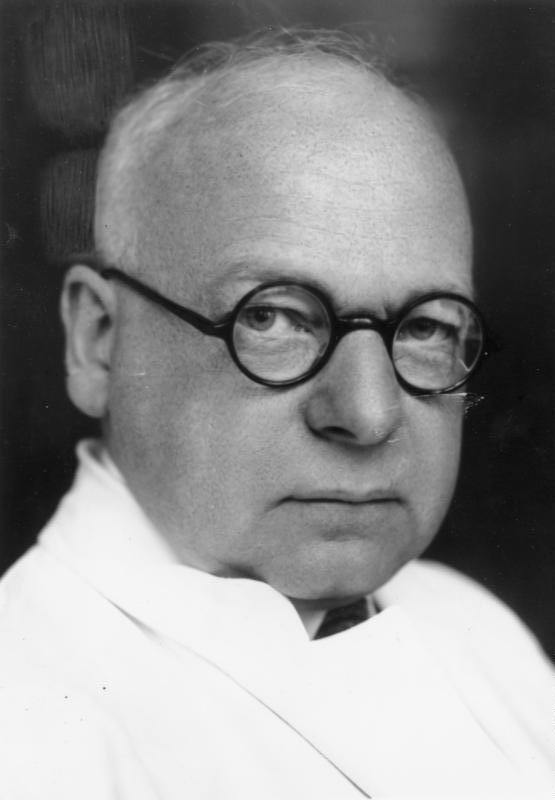
Paul Diepgen (1943)

Paul Diepgen (24 November 1878 – 2 January 1966) was a German gynecologist and historian of medicine. He was born in Aachen.

Diepgen studied medicine at the universities of Tübingen, Leipzig, Bonn and Freiburg, receiving his doctorate in 1902 with the dissertation Über zwei Fälle von Thorakopagus. From 1905 he worked as an assistant at the university women's clinic in Freiburg, and in 1910 he obtained his habilitation under the direction of Ludwig Aschoff. In 1915 he became an associate professor, and from 1919 to 1929 he served as chief physician at the Lorettokrankenhaus in Freiburg.

In 1929 he transferred as a professor to the University of Berlin, and for 17 years was director of the Institut für Geschichte der Medizin und Naturwissenschaften (Institute for the History of Medicine and Natural Sciences). In 1947 he was named a visiting professor for the history of medicine at the University of Mainz, where in 1949 he received a full professorship.

From 1908 to 1966 he was a member of the Deutsche Gesellschaft für Geschichte der Medizin, Naturwissenschaft und Technik (German Society for the History of Medicine, Natural Science and Technology). In 1936 he became a member of the Deutsche Akademie der Naturforscher Leopoldina. He was the grandfather of politician Eberhard Diepgen.

Diepgen died in Mainz in 1966 at the age of 87.

== Selected works ==
- Gualteri Agilonis summa medicinalis: nach den Münchener Codices lat. Nr. 325 und 13124 erstmalig ediert mit einer vergleichenden Betrachtungen älterer medizinischer Kompendien des Mittelaters. Leipzig: Johann Ambrosius Barth 1911.
- Geschichte der Medizin; die historische Entwicklung der Heilkunde und des ärztlichen Lebens, 1913 – History of medicine; the historical development of medicine, etc.
- Die Heilkunde und der ärztliche Beruf : eine Einführung, 1938 – Medicine and the medical profession: an introduction.
- Zur Frauenheilkunde im byzantinischen Kulturkreis des Mittelalters, 1950 – On gynecology in the Byzantine culture of the Middle Ages.
- Über den Einfluss der authoritativen Theologie auf die Medizin des Mittelalters, 1958 – On the influence of authoritative theology on medicine in the Middle Ages.
- Frau und Frauenheilkunde in der Kultur des Mittelalters, 1963 – Gynecology in the culture of the Middle Ages.
