= Johann von Dumreicher =

Austrian surgeon

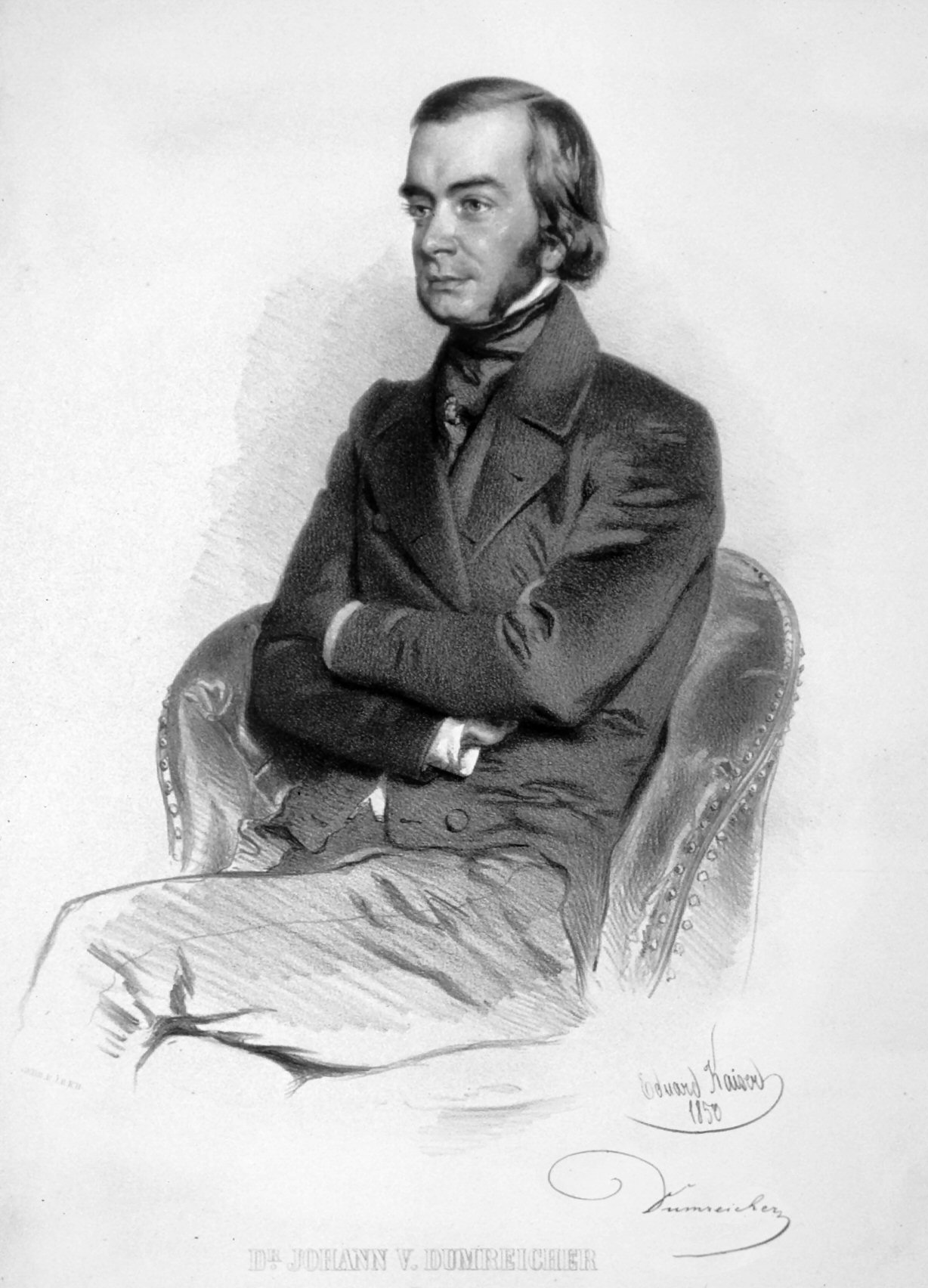
Johann von Dumreicher (1815–1880)

Johann von Dumreicher, full name Johann Heinrich Georg Freiherr Dumreicher von Österreicher (13 January 1815, Trieste – 16 November 1880, Januševec, near Zagreb), was an Austrian surgeon. He was the father of Armand von Dumreicher (1845–1908), a politician known for educational reforms.

He studied medicine at the University of Vienna, earning his doctorate in 1838. In 1844 he was habilitated as lecturer at Vienna, and in 1846 became primary physician of the surgical department at the Allgemeines Krankenhaus. In 1849 he was appointed professor of surgery, as well as head of the surgical clinic.

Known for his work in orthopedic medicine, his students and assistants included surgeons Eduard Albert (1841–1900) and Wenzel von Linhart (1821–1877), gynecologists Rudolf Kaltenbach (1842–1893) and Friedrich Schauta (1849–1919), obstetrician Ludwig Bandl (1842–1892) and surgeon Carl Nicoladoni (1847–1902).

Dumreicher distinguished himself in the Austro-Prussian War of 1866, and in 1869 was put in charge of a commission tasked with reform and reorganization of Austrian military medicine. One of his better-known publications was an 1878 treatise titled Über die Notwendigkeit von Reformen des Unterrichts an den medizinischen Fakultäten Österreichs, which dealt with the need of teaching reforms at Austrian medical faculties.

Dumreicher had professional differences regarding medical philosophy and methodology with surgeon Theodor Billroth (1829–1894), which resulted in a long-standing feud between the two doctors. Billroth became further angered when Dumreicher, just prior to his death in 1880, recommended Eduard Albert to be his successor as head of the First Department of Surgery at the University of Vienna. It was Billroth's contention that it was Vincenz Czerny (1845–1916), rather than Albert, who deserved the promotion.

His burial site is located at the Hetzendorfer cemetery in Vienna. Since 1953, in Donaustadt (22nd District, Vienna), the Dumreichergasse has been named in his honor.
