= Franz von Pitha =

Czech-Austrian surgeon (1810–1875)

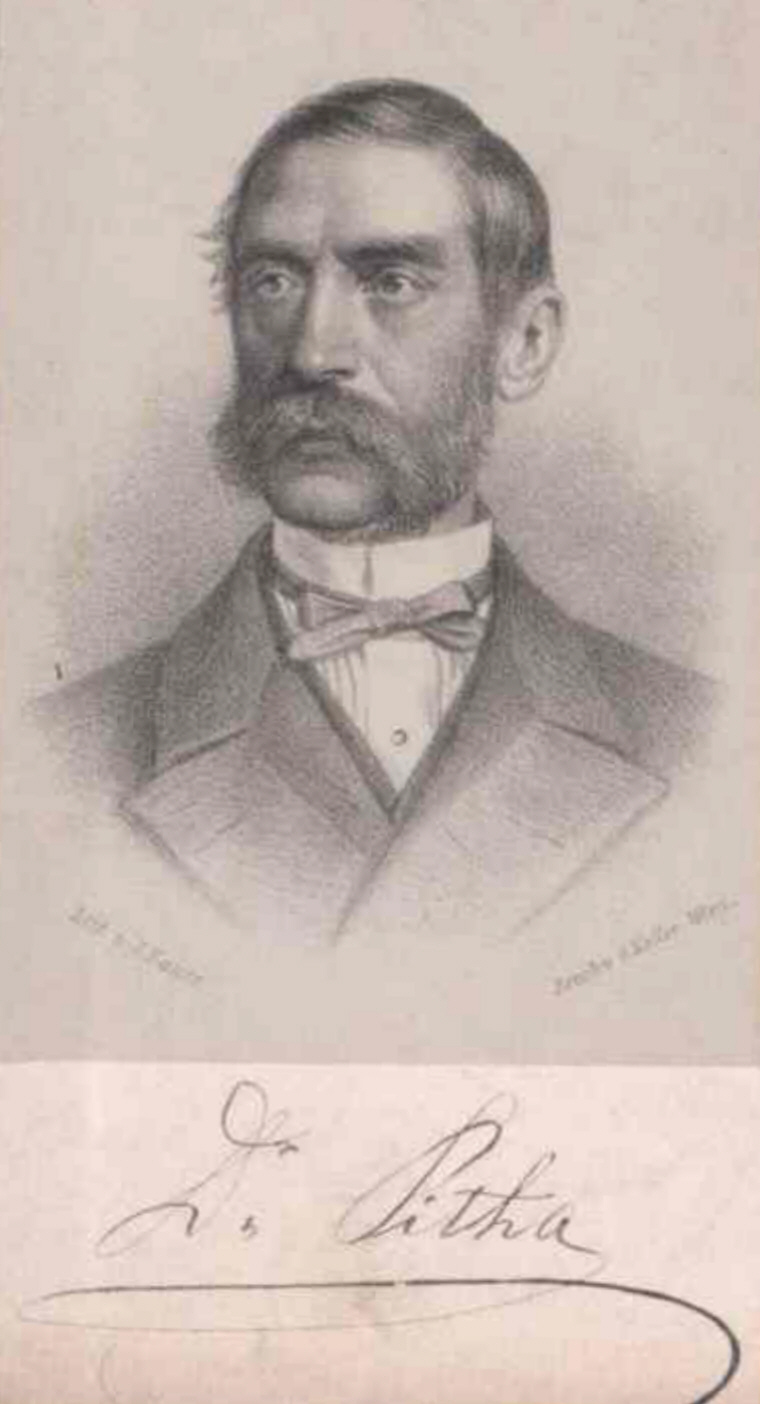
- Born: 8 February 1810; Řakom, Bohemia, Austrian Empire
- Died: 29 December 1875 (aged 65); Vienna, Austria-Hungary
- Occupation: Surgeon

Franz Freiherr von Pitha (born Jiří František Piťha; 8 February 1810 – 29 December 1875) was a Czech-Austrian surgeon. He was rector of the Charles University in 1854–1855.

== Biography ==
Pitha was born Jiří František Piťha in Řakom near Klatovy (today part of Dolany in the Czech Republic). In 1836, he received his medical doctorate at Prague, and was later a professor of surgery at Charles University in Prague, and at Josephs Academy (Josephinum) in Vienna, where he was chair of surgery from 1857 to 1874.

During the Italian Wars of Independence, Pitha was chief of field medical services. In this role he made advancements in Austrian military hygiene, and also gained experience regarding battle-related injuries. He published a treatise titled Verletzungen und Krankheiten der Extremitäten (Injuries and Diseases of the Extremities), as a result of his war-time experiences.

Pitha was instrumental in acquiring a position for Theodor Billroth (1829–1894) at the medical faculty in Vienna, and with Billroth he published an important textbook on surgery called Handbuch der allgemeinen und speciellen Chirurgie mit Einschluss der topographischen Anatomie, Operations- und Verbandlehre (Textbook of General and Specialized Surgery with the Inclusion of Topographical Anatomy, Operations and Bandaging Skills).

Pitha was knight of the Order of Leopold and recipient of the Order of the Iron Crown 2nd class. He was ennobled in 1859 and raised to the baronial rank in January 1875. He had three daughters with his wife Emilia née Barter.
