= Piskacek's sign =

Indication of pregnancy

In medicine, Piskaček's sign is a physical indication of pregnancy.

It is defined as asymmetry of the enlarged uterus, palpable during pelvic examination, after the first few weeks of pregnancy. It is attributed to lateral implantation of the embryo, which can enlarge one uterine horn before the other. It has also been described as focal softening of the uterus, contrasted to the firmness of the area where the placenta is implanted.

It is named after obstetrician Ludwig Piskaček (pronounced PIS-ka-check), who described it in Vienna in 1899, though it had already been noted by Robert Latou Dickinson of New York in 1892. A similar physical sign had been described by Carl von Fernwald Braun. It comes from an era when laboratory tests for pregnancy had not been developed, but experience gained in pelvic examination during early pregnancy by western gynecologists led them to publish their physical findings, allowing clinical diagnosis of pregnancy. Other such signs of early pregnancy include Goodell, Hegar, Hartman and Chadwick signs.

== Medical advances ==
Early methods for detecting pregnancy primarily relied on physical examinations, these findings were often subjective and unable to include later stages of gestation. Piskaçek's sign, introduced in 1899 by Ludwig Piskaçek's described the asymmetric enlargement of the uterus that occurs when the embryo implants on one side, which could be felt during a pelvic examination. While useful and clinically valuable at the time, this technique was limiting and varied in reliability.

Development of biochemical testing and laboratory diagnostics have since changed early pregnancy detection. Modern medical advances have allowed for biochemical imaging technologies to be more sensitive and accurate when testing for signs of pregnancy. Modern tests identify the hormone human chorionic gonadotropin(hCG) in urine or blood, allowing for pregnancy to be detected as early as 9–10 days before ovulation or before a missed menstrual period. Due to blood based hCG testing having higher sensitivity, it can also allow tracking for early pregnancy progression. Continuing research on reproductive biomarker in both humans and animals have continued to improve accuracy of early pregnancy diagnosis.

Advances in medical imaging have further strengthened the capabilities to detect early signs of pregnancy. The creation of transvaginal ultrasonography allows clinicians to visualize the gestational sac at approximately 4–5 weeks gestation. Ultrasounds provide a more clear and direct way to visually confirm signs of early pregnancy, enabling early assessment of location and developmental progress. Biochemical testing and ultrasound technology have since replaced traditional physical sign techniques like Piskaçek's sign in routine clinical practice.

== Studies done on Piskaçek's sign ==
Piskaçek's sign was considered to be a reliable early method of detecting pregnancy, though now it is no longer considered to be a definitive sign of pregnancy due to advancements in medical technology. During a study published in 1985, it was present in a majority of patients who had come to seek medical care between 6 and 11 weeks of pregnancy, with the highest prevalence around 9 weeks, where roughly 74% of the women studied showed focal uterine softening. Those who showed focal uterine softening after 14 weeks were considered to be at a higher risk for abnormal pregnancy.

Pisçakek's sign was also more likely to be present in a woman who had given birth at least once already (31% compared to 21%) when measuring the pregnancy from 6 weeks to 22 weeks. It was also more prevalent in the left side of the uterus (37%) vs the right side of the uterus (26%).

When both Dickinson and Pisçakek discovered the sign they attributed it to the site of placental formation. During this 1986 study research showed that this attribution was accurate, with 88% of placental formation sites matching with a 90% overlap over the softened tissue.

== Real world application ==
At home pregnancy tests have allowed individuals to confirm pregnancy at an earlier stage in a more private and comfortable setting, shifting detection from a more clinical environment to personal use. This development has increased accessibility, supporting earlier awareness and decision-making.

In medical practice, early detection of hCG detection plays an essential role in monitoring possible complication during early stages of pregnancy's, examples include ectopic pregnancy or early pregnancy loss. Hormones are not only important in detecting early signs of pregnancy but tracking it is necessary in fertility treatments. Through hormone detection, timing of ovulation, implantation, and hormonal support can be tracked which are key factors for in vitro fertilization. Ultrasound imaging also helps support these methods by allowing providers to assess pregnancy, location, progression, and early structural development.

Improved early detection supports earlier access to prenatal care which is associated with improved maternal outcomes and reduced pregnancy-related complications. Early and consistent prenatal care has been showed to reduce risks of low birth weight and preterm birth. Consistent prenatal care has also showed support of early management of maternal conditions such as hypertension, anemia and gestational diabetes. Population based studies also show that consistent prenatal visits contribute to improved birth outcomes and infant survival. These findings support that accurate and reliable early pregnancy detection, help enable earlier and more consistent prenatal care, playing an important role in reducing pregnancy related complications at the population level.
