= Hegar =

Hegar may refer to:

- Hegar's sign
- Hegar dilator
- Hegar (surname)
