= Heartburn in pregnancy =

- Other names: Indigestion in pregnancy, acid reflux in pregnancy
- Specialty: Family medicine, obstetrics and gynecology
- Symptoms: Burning in the chest or throat
- Complications: Inflammation of the esophagus, cough, asthma
- Causes: Pressure from the baby, hormone changes
- Risk factors: Fatty or spicy food
- Diagnostic method: Based on symptoms
- Differential diagnosis: Peptic ulcer disease, achalasia, preeclampsia, liver disease in pregnancy
- Treatment: Small frequent meals, avoiding eating before sleeping, sleeping with head raised, reducing caffeine
- Medication: Antacids, sucralfate, H2 blockers, proton pump inhibitors
- Prognosis: Generally resolves after delivery
- Frequency: 17 to 45%

Heartburn in pregnancy is a common physiological symptom of burning in the esophagus or throat during pregnancy. There may also be associated regurgitation. It does not appear to affect pregnancy outcomes; however, it affects quality of life during pregnancy. Complications may include inflammation of the esophagus, cough, or asthma. In those who are affected, it usually starts near the end of the first trimester or in the second trimester, becomes more frequent by the time of the third trimester, and resolves on its own soon after delivery.

Risk factors may include fatty or spicy food. The underlying mechanism involves hormonal changes, but the size of the baby may also contribute. This results in stomach acid entering the esophagus. Diagnosis is generally based on symptoms; though it may rarely be supported by upper endoscopy. Esophagitis, on the other hand, is uncommon and usually occurs in those who had the disease before the pregnancy. The diagnosis of gastroesophageal reflux disease (GERD) can be considered if heartburn is troublesome or has complications. If a person had the disease before the pregnancy, heartburn can be considered an exacerbation of GERD.

Initial efforts often include eating small frequent meals and avoiding eating before sleeping. Sleeping with the head raised and reducing caffeine may also be tried. Antireflux medications can be potentially teratogenic, so lifestyle modifications may be preferable in mild cases. Medications that may help include antacids, sucralfate, H2 blockers, and proton pump inhibitors. Magnesium, aluminum, and calcium-containing antacids appear safe. Heartburn in pregnancy is common, particularly after 12 weeks of gestation. About 17 to 45% of pregnancies are affected at some point.

== Causes ==
The sensation of heartburn appears when stomach acid passes from the stomach into the esophagus. In pregnancy, progesterone and estrogen levels are elevated in the blood, increasing throughout pregnancy. Progesterone and estrogen affect the lower esophageal sphincter by relaxing its smooth muscles and decreasing its pressure, which holds stomach contents from going up into the oesophageal lumen. On the other hand, the growing baby may also play a role by creating additional pressure to the stomach and increasing intragastric pressure. Another possible contributing factor is the displacement of the lower esophageal sphincter up into the thoracic cavity during pregnancy. The thoracic cavity has negative pressure, so it can decrease lower esophageal sphincter pressure.

== Treatment ==
Mild heartburn in pregnancy can be treated by lifestyle modifications. Avoiding eating too much food at a time can help prevent indigestion, so smaller meals several times a day might be preferable during pregnancy than three large meals. Avoiding spicy food, fatty food, and caffeine prevents symptoms from worsening. Chewing gum stimulates saliva production, which can neutralize stomach acid, so chewing gum is also often recommended, but it is not known whether it is effective. Avoiding lying down for some time after eating and sleeping with the head and shoulders elevated can stop stomach acid from going up the esophagus. Drinking alcohol and smoking tobacco can lead to indigestion and can also harm the baby, so cessation is the common advice. Also, medications that cause heartburn may be avoided.

Medications are often used when lifestyle changes are not effective. For symptomatic GERD in pregnancy, a step-up algorithm exists. According to a review published in 2022, it includes a few steps, each of which can be tried if the previous one did not help. The algorithm involves lifestyle modifications, antacids, sucralfate, histamine-2 receptor antagonists and proton pump inhibitors (histamine-2 receptor antagonists and proton pump inhibitors were suggested to be used with antacids).

According to the 2015 Cochrane systematic review, medications seem to be effective in relieving heartburn during pregnancy, but the review couldn't determine which medication is the best. Another 2015 systematic review found that antacids may be effective, and there is a consensus that they should be used if lifestyle changes did not work.

== Prognosis ==
Heartburn in pregnancy can become more severe towards the end of pregnancy, but it usually resolves after delivery. During pregnancy, lifestyle changes may help improve the condition. In some women, heartburn can persist for some time after delivery and may require treatment. In addition, heartburn can be due to an exacerbation of pre-existing gastroesophageal reflux disease. Despite heartburn in pregnancy being thought to be a benign condition, some studies have reported that heartburn during pregnancy may increase the risk of developing gastroesophageal reflux disease in subsequent pregnancies, but the overall number of studies is small.

== See also ==
- Signs and symptoms of pregnancy
- Physiological changes in pregnancy
