= Ladin's sign =

Clinical sign of pregnancy

Ladin's sign is a clinical sign of pregnancy in which there is softening in the midline of the uterus anteriorly at the junction of the uterus and cervix. It occurs and is detectable with a manual examination at about 6 weeks' gestation. Ladin's sign is often present during the woman's first pelvic exam when pregnancy is suspected. Cervical length is also significant in pregnancy and shorter or shortening length can increase chances of preterm labour and delivery as this shortening happens naturally at the beginning of labour. The cervix softens from conception and combined with other signs of early pregnancy, detecting Ladin's sign can assist clinicians in verifying a diagnosis of pregnancy.

Abnormal softening of the cervix can also occur in pregnancy, so testing for abnormalities of uterine cervical softening, including sheer wave speed measurement, can be used as a method of distinguishing between normal and abnormal softening.

== See also ==
- Chadwick sign
- Goodell's sign
- Hegar sign
