= Von Braun-Fernwald's sign =

Clinical sign indicating pregnancy

Von Braun-Fernwald's sign is a clinical sign in which there is an irregular softening and enlargement of the uterine fundus during early pregnancy. It occurs at 5–8 weeks gestation.

The sign is named after Karl von Braun-Fernwald.

== See also ==
- Piskacek's sign
