= Ludwig Piskaček =

Austrian obstetrician (1854–1932)

Ludwig Piskaček (16 November 1854, Karcag, Hungary – 19 September 1932, Vienna, Austria) was an Austrian obstetrician remembered for describing Piskaček's sign and for his advancements made in the field of midwifery.

== Biography ==
He trained at the University of Vienna, gaining his doctorate of general medicine on July 29, 1882.

After graduating, he worked in the Department of Ear Diseases at Widerhofer's children's clinic in the ear disease department and apprentice in surgery at the Albert Clinic until 1884. On March 1st of the same year, he became an assistant at the second obstetrical clinic under Josef Späth (1823–1896) and his successor August Breisky (1832–1889) until 1888. He would qualify for and begin lecturing in obstetrics and gynecology for the Medical Faculty of the University of Vienna the next year. In 1890 he would become the head of the Upper Austrian State Maternity Hospital and professor of obstetrics at the Midwifery School in Linz.

In April of 1901 he would continue as a professor of obstetrics at the Midwifery School in Vienna, also taking roles as the director of the Lower Austrian State Maternity Hospital and the head of the Third Obstetric Clinic. After his retirement in 1925, he would serve as a member of the Upper and Lower Austrian State Health Councils.

== List of written works ==
- Lehrbuch für Schülerinnen des Hebammencurses und Nachschlagebuch für Hebammen; ("Textbook for students of the midwifery course and reference book for midwives").
  - This would be updated and translated into several different editions over the following decades.
- Die Amputationen, Resektionen und Exartikulationen im Dezennium 1873–1883 an der ersten chirurgischen Universitätsklinik in Wien; ("Amputations, Resections, and Disarticulations in the Decade 1873–1883 at the First Surgical University Clinic in Vienna").
- Zur Frage der Peritonealdrainage; ("On the Question of Peritoneal Drainage").
- Zur Behandlung der Scheiden und Gebärmuttervorfällo mittels Eipessarien; ("On the Treatment of Vaginal and Uterine Prolapse Using Egg-Dose Syringes").
- Forzeps in mortua mit Extraktion einer asphyktischen und wiederbelebten Frucht; ("Forceps in Mortua with Extraction of an Asphyxiated and Reanimated Fetus").
- Ein Fall von genitalem Unterkieferfibrom, Abtragung desselben, Heilung; ("A Case of Genital Mandibular Fibroma, Removal of the Same, and Healing").
- Die Indikationsstellung des Kaiserschnittes nebst kasuistischen Beiträgen zur Porroschen und Sängerschen Operation; ("The Indication for Cesarean Section, Including Case Studies on Porro and Sänger Operations").
- Beiträge zur Therapie und Kasuistik der Uterusrupturen; ("Contributions to the Therapy and Case Studies of Uterine Ruptures").
- Über Ausladungen umschriebener Gebärmutterabschnitte als diagnostischem Zeichen im Anfangsstadium der Gravidität; ("On the protrusion of circumscribed uterine segments as a diagnostic sign in the early stages of pregnancy").
  - This book contains descriptions of Piskaček's sign, leading to the incorrect crediting of the discovery to Piskaček. In the text, Piskaček describes and attributes the observations of the phenomenon done by Robert Dickinson.
- Zur Erkenung des frischen Blutergusses in die freie Bauchhöhlc nach Ruptur eines oktopischen Fruchtsackes; ("On the recognition of fresh hematoma in the free abdominal cavity after rupture of an octopic gestational sac").

== Impact in the field of midwifery ==
The period of Piskaček's professional career coincided with major advancements in Australian midwifery and he helped implement these reforms, especially the adoption of antiseptic practices, in obstetrics training and care. Piskaček believed that rising costs of antiseptic materials were leading to over-dilution and ineffective application. In 1900, he argued for increased midwife compensation, which he believed would solve the problem. Ultimately, this advice would have little effect until decades later.
