= Pregnancy-related anxiety =

Mental condition

- Specialty: Psychiatry

Pregnancy-related anxiety is a distinct anxiety contextualized by pregnancy specific fears, worries, and concerns. Pregnancy-related anxiety is characterized by increased concerns or excessive fears and worries about their unborn baby, childbirth, body image, and impending motherhood. This anxiety is also known as pregnancy-specific anxiety, pregnancy anxiety, pregnancy distress, or pregnancy concerns and was first identified in 1956 when women were observed to be anxious about different aspects of their pregnancy. However, it was not until conventional measures of anxiety and depression were shown to not adequately capture this anxiety that the first empirical evidence was provided. Subsequent studies have provided further support for the distinctiveness of pregnancy-related anxiety from state and trait anxiety, depression and anxiety disorder symptomology.

== Presentation ==
=== Complications ===
Several adverse outcomes are regularly associated with pregnancy-related anxiety. This anxiety is a risk factor for negative fetal/child outcomes, including preterm birth, low birth weight, developmental delays, and behavioral problems. Pregnancy-related anxiety is also linked to negative affectivity and poorer child and infant cognitive development. Health risk behaviors such as alcohol consumption and continued smoking during pregnancy have also been associated with pregnancy-related anxiety. This is particularly concerning given that these behaviors introduce harmful teratogens into the baby's environment during critical developmental periods.

== Diagnosis ==
Several instruments assess pregnancy-related anxiety. These include unidimensional scales such as Levin's Pregnancy Anxiety Scale, Cote-Arsenault's Pregnancy Anxiety Scale, the Pregnancy Related Thoughts Scale, and the Pregnancy Specific Anxiety Scale. In addition, the Pregnancy Related Anxiety Questionnaire (PRAQ-R) is a multidimensional scale that assesses core concerns of pregnant women (i.e., childbirth, appearance, and the unborn baby). The PRAQ-R2 is the revised version applicable for women of any parity.

== Prevalence ==
The reported prevalence of pregnancy-related anxiety varies depending on the country and timing of the assessment. For example, in high-income countries, the prevalence is around 10%, whereas, in low-income or less developed countries, it is as high as 56%. Also, the prevalence of this anxiety type can fluctuate across the duration of pregnancy, with higher prevalence noted in the earlier and later stages of pregnancy consistent with a u-shaped course. This u-shaped curve is consistent with worries and concerns in early pregnancy for the unborn child being more salient in the first trimester and fears about childbirth more salient in late pregnancy.
