= William Goodell (gynecologist) =

American physician (1829–1894)

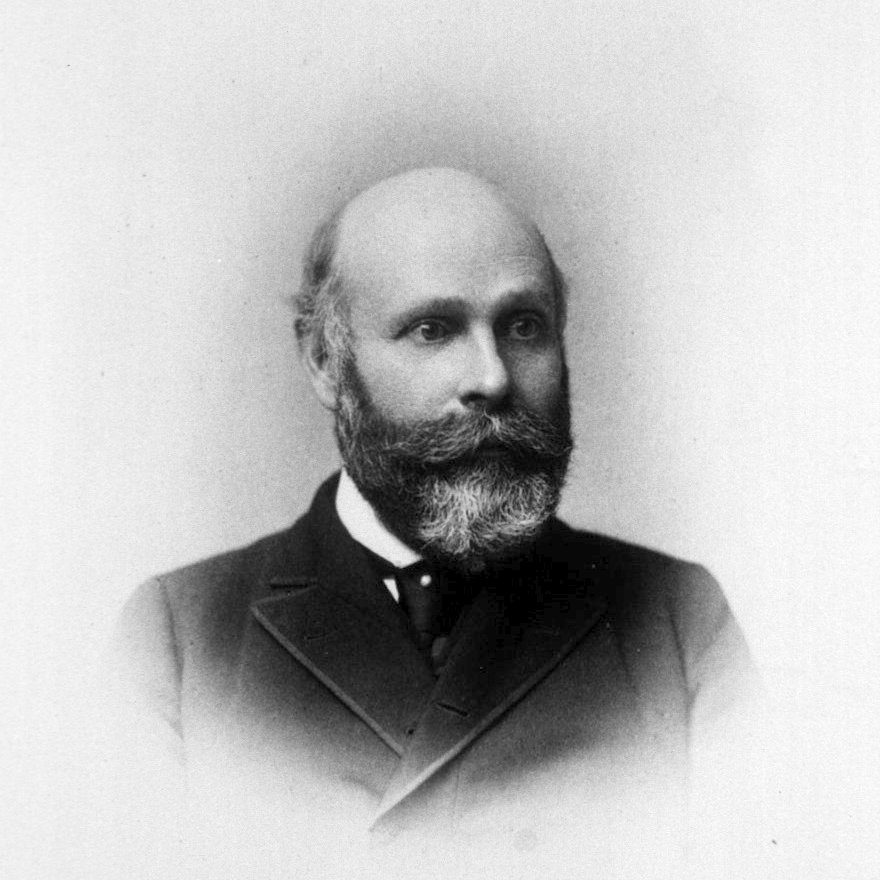
- Photograph by Frederick Gutekunst, 1870
- Born: October 17, 1829; Malta
- Died: October 27, 1894 (aged 65); Philadelphia, Pennsylvania
- Known for: Goodell's sign
- Medical career
- Profession: Doctor
- Sub-specialties: Gynecology

William Goodell (October 17, 1829 – October 27, 1894) was an American gynecologist from Philadelphia, best remembered for first describing what is now referred to as Goodell's sign.

== Biography ==
William Goodell was born in Malta, the son of missionary William Goodell, and studied at Williams College, Massachusetts and Jefferson Medical College, Philadelphia, graduating in 1854. He took over management of the Philadelphia School of Anatomy in the winter of 1854-1855 while the owner David Hayes Agnew recovered from an illness. He worked in Constantinople until 1861. He then worked in general practice in West Chester until he was appointed Lecturer on Obstetric Diseases of Women at the University of Pennsylvania in 1870, and then Clinical Professor in Diseases of Women and Children in 1874.

He was elected as a member to the American Philosophical Society in 1877.

In 1882, he removed a 112 lbs ovarian tumor from a 31 year old patient, who weighted 75 lbs after the operation.

== Selected works ==
- A Sketch of the Life and Writings of Louyse Bourgeois, Midwife to Marie de' Medici, the Queen of Henry IV of France, The Annual Address of the Retiring President before the Philadelphia County Medical Society. (1876)
- Lessons in Gynecology, a textbook (1879)
- A Years Work in Oöphorectomy, University Medical Magazine, University of Pennsylvania (1888)
- Laceration of the Perineum and of the Cervix, a clinical lecture delivered at the Hospital of the University of Pennsylvania, University Medical Magazine, University of Pennsylvania (1888)
- Chronic Peritonitis with Pseudo-Membranous Exudation, Ascites and Matting Together of the Intestines, Simulation a Tumor. Laparotomy., a clinical lectured delivered at the Hospital of the University of Pennsylvania, University Medical Magazine, University of Pennsylvania (1888)
- The Abuse of Uterine Treatment Through Mistaken Diagnosis, Transactions of the College of Physicians of Philadelphia, (1889)
- The Effect of Castration on Woman, and Other Problems in Gynecology The Medical News; a Weekly Medical Journal (1893)
- Introductory, Clinical Gynaecology, Medical and Surgical; for Students and Practitioners (1895)
- Clinical Notes on the Extirpation of the Ovaries for Insanity."...deemed a measure of sound policy ....to stamp out insanity by castrating all the insane men and spaying all the insane women," page 295. Year 1882. The American Journal of Insanity, Volume 38
