= Hegar (surname) =

Hegar is a surname. Notable people with the surname include:

- Ernst Ludwig Alfred Hegar (1830-1914), German gynecologist
- Friedrich Hegar (1841–1927), Swiss composer, conductor and violinist
- Glenn Hegar (born 1970), American politician
- Mary Jennings Hegar (born 1976), American political candidate
