= Signs and symptoms of pregnancy =

Signs and symptoms of pregnancy are common, benign conditions that result from the changes to the body that occur during pregnancy. Signs and symptoms of pregnancy typically change as pregnancy progresses, although several symptoms may be present throughout. Depending on severity, common symptoms in pregnancy can develop into complications. Pregnancy symptoms may be categorized based on trimester as well as region of the body affected. Each pregnancy can be quite different and many people do not experience the same or all of the symptoms. If a person is concerned about their symptoms they should be encouraged to speak with an appropriate healthcare professional.

== Early pregnancy ==
Many of the early signs of pregnancy will be similar to symptoms that come right before a period, and it can be hard to tell the difference.

=== Implantation bleeding ===
Implantation bleeding is light vaginal bleeding in the first 10–14 days of pregnancy caused by the normal implantation of the embryo in the uterine lining. Implantation bleeding may be confused with a regular period. Heavy vaginal bleeding in the first trimester or bleeding associated with pain, may be a sign of a complication, such as a miscarriage or an ectopic pregnancy, that would need to be assessed by a healthcare provider.

=== Breast tenderness ===
Hormonal changes in early pregnancy can cause breast swelling and tenderness. Breast tenderness typically improves as the body adjusts to the pregnancy.

=== Fatigue ===
Fatigue in the first trimester is common due to changes in hormones.

=== Increased Vaginal Discharge ===
An increase in vaginal discharge is common during pregnancy due to hormonal changes. The discharge, known as leukorrhea, is usually thin and milky white. However, if the discharge changes color or consistency significantly, it is essential to consult a healthcare provider.

=== Nausea and vomiting (morning sickness) ===
Nausea and vomiting, known as morning sickness, occurs in 80% of pregnant women. Although described as "morning sickness," pregnant women can experience this nausea any time of day or night. The exact cause of morning sickness remains unknown. Nausea and vomiting in pregnancy is typically mild and self-limited, resolving on its own by the 14th week of pregnancy. Other causes should also be ruled out when considering treatment. Initial treatment is typically conservative, and may include changes to diet and emotional support. For women that do not improve with initial treatment, medications, such as pyridoxine and doxylamine, may also be used. A rare form of severe nausea and vomiting known as hyperemesis gravidarum can occur in 1% of pregnant women and can affect fetal and maternal health.

== Mid and later pregnancy ==
=== Musculoskeletal pain and discomfort ===
- Low back pain and pelvic girdle pain – Pregnancy-related low back pain (PLBP) and pregnancy-related pelvic girdle pain (PGP) are common conditions occurring in an estimated 45% of pregnant women and 25% of postpartum women. Most of the literature does not distinguish between PLBP and PGP as since their precise definitions often overlap, however it is possible to differentiate them through history taking, clinical examination, provocative test maneuvers, and imaging. Pregnancy-related low back pain and pelvic girdle pain can occur together or separately. The pain is often dull, intermittent, worse in the evening, and usually occurs within 30 minutes of activities like walking, standing, or sitting. Both PLBP and PGP can negatively impact quality of life for those affected, and the severity of discomfort typically increases with advancing pregnancy. During pregnancy, the enlarged abdomen and gravid uterus place additional strain on lumbar muscles and shift the pregnant woman's center of gravity. These postural compensations culminate in an increased load on both lumbar spinal musculature and the sacroiliac ligaments, manifesting as low back pain and/or pelvic girdle pain. Hormonal changes throughout pregnancy also cause an increase in joint laxity further contributing to the development of PLBP and PGP. Predictors for the development of low-back and pelvic pain during pregnancy include strenuous work, prior lumbo-pelvic pain, and a history of pregnancy-related PGP and LBP. Additional risk factors are advanced maternal age, increased parity, and higher body mass index, and previous pelvic trauma. There is moderate-quality of evidence that interventions such as physical therapy management, osteomanipulative therapy, acupuncture or craniosacral therapy reduce low back pain during pregnancy. Maternity support belts have not been shown to reduce low back pain in pregnancy. Land or water based exercise may both prevent and treat lower back and pelvic pain, yet current research in this area is of low quality.
- Carpal tunnel syndrome – Carpal tunnel syndrome can occur in up to 70% of pregnant women and typically has a benign course. It manifests as pain, numbness, and tingling in the thumb, index finger, middle finger and the thumb side of the ring finger. The symptoms of carpal tunnel syndrome during pregnancy are usually mild and do not require treatment. However, if necessary, wrist splinting at night is the initial treatment that is recommended.
- Leg cramps – Leg cramps (involuntary spasms of the calf muscles) can affect between 30% and 50% of pregnant women and most commonly occur in the last three months of pregnancy. Leg cramps typically last only for a few seconds, however they can be extremely painful and last for minutes. There is not clear evidence whether oral electrolyte and vitamin treatments (such as magnesium, calcium, vitamin B or vitamin C) are effective in treating leg cramps during pregnancy.
- Round Ligament pain – Round ligament pain commonly occurs in the second trimester and manifests as a sudden, sharp pain in the groin area or lower abdomen, on one or both sides. Typically the pain only lasts for a few seconds. During pregnancy, the growing uterus can put stress on the round ligament of the uterus, causing it to stretch and lead to pain. Paracetamol (acetaminophen) is the recommended pain reliever for pregnant women with round ligament pain.

=== Fluid imbalance and kidney function ===
- Dehydration – Caused by expanded intravascular space and increased third spacing of fluids. Complications include uterine contractions, which may occur because dehydration causes body release of ADH, which is similar to oxytocin in structure. Oxytocin itself can cause uterine contractions and thus ADH can cross-react with oxytocin receptors and cause contractions.
- Swelling/Edema – Swelling occurs when excess fluid accumulates in regions of the body, resulting in abnormal enlargement or "puffiness." This commonly occurs in the upper and lower extremities. Compression of the inferior vena cava (IVC) and pelvic veins by the uterus leads to increased hydrostatic pressure in the vasculature of the lower extremities. This increase in pressure shunts fluid from within the vasculature to the extracellular space. Treatment includes raising legs above the heart, advising patient to sleep on her side to prevent the uterus from compressing the inferior vena cava, reflexology, water emersion & compression stockings.
- Increased urinary frequency – Caused by increased intravascular volume, elevated GFR (glomerular filtration rate), and compression of the bladder by the expanding uterus. It may appear rather suddenly by head engagement of the fetus into cephalic presentation. Doctors advise pregnant women to continue fluid intake despite this. Urinalysis and culture are ordered to rule out infection, which can also cause increased urinary frequency but typically is accompanied by dysuria (pain when urinating).

=== Gastrointestinal (GI) ===
- Heartburn – Heartburn (Regurgitation) is a burning pain in the chest, behind the breastbone that occurs when stomach acid travel up the esophagus and causes irritation. This sometimes happens in pregnancy due to relaxation of the lower esophageal sphincter (LES), which normally keeps acidic stomach contents in the stomach. Additionally, heartburn is worsened when the growing fetus increases intra-abdominal pressure, thereby compressing the stomach and pushing stomach contents through the relaxed lower esophageal sphincter (LES). The acidic contents of the stomach irritate the lining of the esophagus, resulting in a burning sensation in the mid chest. Regurgitation and heartburn in pregnancy can be at least alleviated by eating multiple small meals a day, avoiding eating within three hours of going to bed, and sitting up straight when eating. If diet and lifestyle changes are not enough, antacids and alginates may be required to control indigestion, particularly if the symptoms are mild. Surgical repair may also be indicated. If these, in turn, are not enough, proton pump inhibitors may be used. If more severe, it may be diagnosed as gastroesophageal reflux disease (GERD).
- Constipation – Constipation occurs in 11–38% of pregnant women. Constipation during pregnancy is thought to be due to decreased smooth muscle motility in the bowel caused by normal increases in progesterone. Treatment for constipation includes dietary modifications, including increased fiber and fluid intake, stool softeners, and laxatives.
- Hemorrhoids – Hemorrhoids are enlarged veins near or inside the rectum. Hemorrhoids are common in pregnancy as a result of constipation and increased intra-abdominal pressure. Hemorrhoids can cause bleeding, pain, and itching. Treatment is symptomatic, including improving underlying constipation. Symptoms may resolve spontaneously after pregnancy, although hemorrhoids may remain in the days after childbirth.

=== Skin and vasculature changes ===
- Diastasis recti – During pregnancy, the growth of the fetus exerts pressure on the abdominal muscles. On occasion, women experience a separation of their rectus abdominis. The rectus abdominis is divided centrally (mid-line) by the fibrous linea alba. In pregnancies that experience rapid fetus growth or in women with weak abdominal muscles, this pressure can cause the rectus abdominis muscle to separate along the linea alba, creating a split between the left and right sides of the rectus abdominis. Diastasis recti is common, and occurs more frequently as pregnancy progresses, up to and including labor. Elevated BMI, multiparity (twins, triplets, etc.), and diabetes have been identified as risk factors. Many cases of diastasis recti correct themselves after birth. In cases that persist, exercise may help, but sometimes surgery is needed to improve symptoms and prevent chronic problems.
- Varicose veins – Dilation of veins in legs caused by relaxation of smooth muscle and increased intravascular pressure due to fluid volume increase. Treatment involves elevation of the legs and pressure stockings to relieve swelling along with warm sitz baths to decrease pain. There is a small amount of evidence that rutosides (a herbal remedy) may relieve symptoms of varicose veins in late pregnancy but it is not yet known if rutosides are safe to take in pregnancy. Risk factors include obesity, lengthy standing or sitting, constrictive clothing and constipation and bearing down with bowel movements.
- Striae gravidarum (stretch marks) – pregnancy-related stretch marks occur in 50% to 90% of women, and are caused both by the skin stretching and by the effects of hormonal changes on fibers in the skin. They are more common in younger women, women of color, women having larger babies and women who are overweight or obese, and they sometimes run in families. Stretch marks generally begin as red or purple stripes (striae rubra), fading to pale or flesh-color (striae alba) after pregnancy that will generally be permanent. They appear most commonly on the abdomen, breasts, buttocks, thighs, and arms, and may cause itching and discomfort. Although several kinds of multi-component creams are marketed and used, along with vitamin E cream, cocoa butter, almond oil and olive oil, none have been shown to prevent or reduce stretch marks in pregnancy. The safety for use in pregnancy of one herbal ingredient used in some products, Centella asiatica, has been questioned. Some treatments used to reduce scarring, such as topical tretinoin lasers, are sometimes used on stretch marks, but evidence on them is limited. Topical tretinoin has been shown to cause malformations in animals, without adequate human studies on safety in human pregnancies.
- Generalized itching – It is a quite common complaint in pregnancy to have generalized itching which is not due to any systemic disease or any skin lesion. The itching is very frustrating and it may disturb sleep which leads to exhaustion and impaired quality of life. There is no clear satisfying treatment for this symptom. More research is needed to define a possible, effective, and safe management.

== See also ==
- Maternal physiological changes in pregnancy
