= Chadwick's sign =

Medical clinical sign

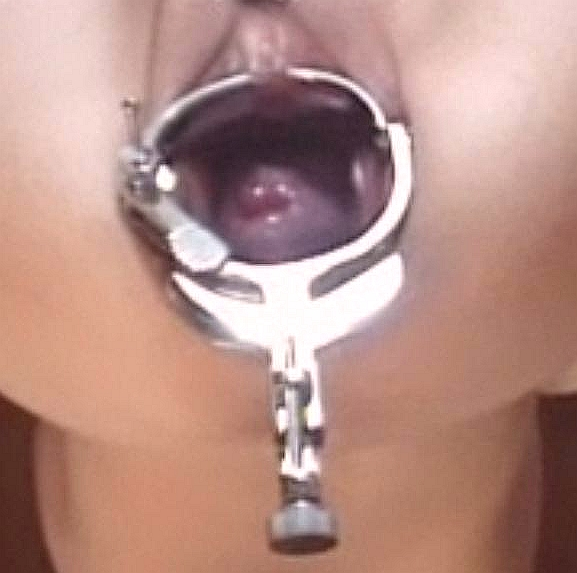
Cervix with a bluish-violet discolouration.

Chadwick sign is a medical clinical sign characterised by the bluish-violet discolouration of the mucous membranes of the vulva, vagina (particularly on the anterior vaginal wall), and the cervix, resulting from venous congestion due to increased blood flow as part of the maternal physiological changes in pregnancy. This clinical sign can be observed during a patient's examination as early as 8 to 12 weeks' gestation, serving as an early sign of pregnancy, but it is rarely seen before 7 weeks' gestation.

The discovery of this colour change dates back to approximately 1836 when French doctor Étienne Joseph Jacquemin (1796–1872) first identified it. Subsequently, James Read Chadwick, after presenting a paper before the American Gynecological Society in 1886, and subsequently publishing it the following year, brought attention to this phenomenon. In his paper, Chadwick acknowledged Jacquemin for the initial discovery of the color changes associated with pregnancy.

== See also ==
- Linea nigra
- Goodell's sign
- Hegar's sign
- Ladin's sign
