= Uterine isthmus =

Inferior-posterior part of uterus

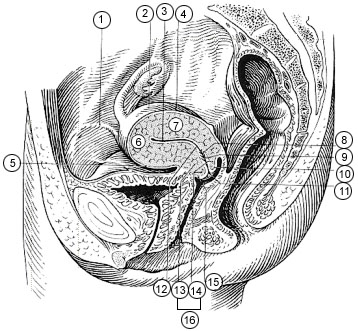
- Uterine isthmus labeled at 12

Details

Identifiers
- Latin: isthmus uteri

The uterine isthmus is the inferior-posterior part of uterus, on its cervical end — here, the uterine muscle (myometrium) is narrower and thinner. It connects the body and cervix.

The uterine isthmus can become more compressibile in pregnancy, which is a finding known as Hegar's sign.
