= Goodell's sign =

Clinical sign indicating pregnancy

In medicine, Goodell's sign is a clinical sign of pregnancy. It is a significant softening of the vaginal portion of the cervix from increased vascularization. This vascularization is a result of hypertrophy and engorgement of the vessels below the growing uterus, which begins about four weeks after the last menstrual period. This sign is palpable during a pelvic exam at approximately six weeks' gestation. Soon afterwards, Chadwick's sign, which is a change or darkening to the color of the vagina due to increased vascularization, becomes visible.

The sign is named after William Goodell (1829–1874).

== See also ==
- Hegar's sign
- Ladin's sign
