= Hegar's sign =

Clinical sign indicative of pregnancy

Hegar's sign is a non-sensitive indication of pregnancy in women—its absence does not exclude pregnancy. It pertains to the features of the cervix and the uterine isthmus. It is demonstrated as a softening in the consistency of the uterus, and the uterus and cervix seem to be two separate regions.

The sign is usually present from 4–8 weeks until the 12th week of pregnancy. Hegar's sign is more difficult to recognize in multiparous women.

Interpretation: On bimanual examination (two fingers in the anterior fornix and two fingers below the uterus per abdomen), the abdominal and vaginal fingers seem to oppose below the body of uterus (examination must be gentle to avoid abortion).

This sign was repeatedly demonstrated and described by Ernst Ludwig Alfred Hegar, a German gynecologist, in 1895. Hegar credited Reinl, one of his assistants, who originally described this sign in 1884.

== See also ==
- Chadwick's sign
- Goodell's sign
- Ladin's sign

== References and further reading ==
- E. Sonntag Das Hegar'sche Schwangerschaftzeichen Leipzig, 1892. Ca. 20 pp. Sammlung Klinischer Vorträge herausgegeben, Leipzig, Neue Folge no. 58.
- A. Hegar Diagnose der frühesten Schwangerschaftsperiode Deutsche Medizinische Wochenschrift, Berlin, 1895, 21 (35): 565–567.
