= Pregnancy =

Time of offspring development in mother's body

- Other names: Gestation
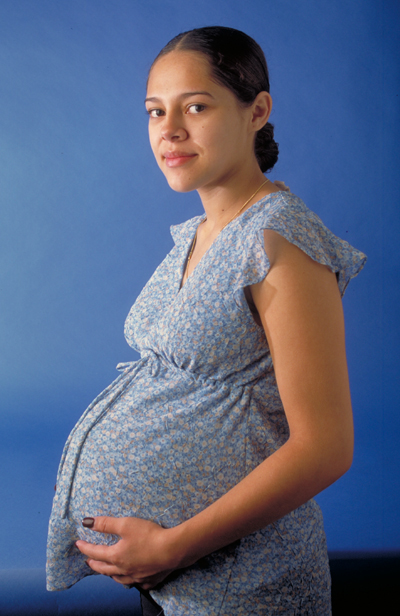
- A woman in the third trimester of pregnancy
- Specialty: Obstetrics, midwifery
- Symptoms: Missed periods, tender breasts, nausea and vomiting, hunger, frequent urination
- Complications: Miscarriage, high blood pressure of pregnancy, gestational diabetes, iron-deficiency anemia, severe nausea and vomiting
- Duration: ~40 weeks from the last menstrual period (38 weeks after conception)
- Diagnostic method: Pregnancy test
- Prevention: Birth control (including emergency contraception)
- Frequency: 213 million (2012)
- Deaths: ▼230,600 (2016)

Pregnancy is the time during which one or more offspring gestates inside a woman's uterus. A multiple pregnancy involves more than one offspring, such as with twins.

Conception usually occurs following vaginal intercourse, but can also occur through assisted reproductive technology procedures. A pregnancy may end in a live birth, a miscarriage, an induced abortion, or a stillbirth. Childbirth typically occurs around 40 weeks from the start of the last menstrual period (LMP), a span known as the gestational age; this is just over nine months. Counting by fertilization age, the length is about 38 weeks. Implantation occurs on average 8–9 days after fertilization. An embryo is the term for the developing offspring during the first seven weeks following implantation (i.e. ten weeks' gestational age), after which the term fetus is used until the birth of a baby.

Signs and symptoms of early pregnancy may include missed periods, tender breasts, morning sickness (nausea and vomiting), hunger, implantation bleeding, and frequent urination. Pregnancy may be confirmed with a pregnancy test. Methods of contraception are used to avoid pregnancy.

Pregnancy is divided into three trimesters of approximately three months each. The first trimester includes conception, which is when the sperm fertilizes the egg. The fertilized egg then travels down the fallopian tube and attaches to the inside of the uterus, where it begins to form the embryo and placenta. During the first trimester, the possibility of miscarriage (natural death of embryo or fetus) is at its highest. Around the middle of the second trimester, movement of the fetus may be felt. At 28 weeks, more than 90% of babies can survive outside of the uterus if provided with high-quality medical care, though babies born at this time will likely experience serious health complications such as heart and respiratory problems and long-term intellectual and developmental disabilities.

Prenatal care improves pregnancy outcomes. Nutrition during pregnancy is important to ensure healthy growth of the fetus. Prenatal care also includes avoiding recreational drugs (including tobacco and alcohol), taking regular exercise, having blood tests, and regular physical examinations. Complications of pregnancy may include disorders of high blood pressure, gestational diabetes, iron-deficiency anemia, and severe nausea and vomiting. In the ideal childbirth, labour begins on its own "at term". Babies born before 37 weeks are preterm and at higher risk of health problems such as cerebral palsy. Babies born between weeks 37 and 39 are considered "early term" while those born between weeks 39 and 41 are considered "full term". Babies born between weeks 41 and 42 weeks are considered "late-term" while after 42 weeks they are considered "post-term". Delivery before 39 weeks by labour induction or caesarean section is not recommended unless required for other medical reasons.

== Terminology ==
William Hunter, Anatomia uteri humani gravidi tabulis illustrata, 1774

Associated terms for pregnancy are gravid and parous. Gravidus and gravid come from the Latin word meaning "heavy" and a pregnant female is sometimes referred to as a gravida. Gravidity refers to the number of times that a female has been pregnant. Similarly, the term parity is used for the number of times that a female carries a pregnancy to a viable stage. Twins and other multiple births are counted as one pregnancy and birth.

A woman who has never been pregnant is referred to as a nulligravida. A woman who is (or has been only) pregnant for the first time is referred to as a primigravida, and a woman in subsequent pregnancies as a multigravida or as multiparous. Therefore, during a second pregnancy a woman would be described as gravida 2, para 1 and upon live delivery as gravida 2, para 2. In-progress pregnancies, abortions, miscarriages and/or stillbirths account for parity values being less than the gravida number. Women who have never carried a pregnancy more than 20 weeks are referred to as nulliparous.

A pregnancy is considered term at 37 weeks of gestation. It is preterm if less than 37 weeks and post-term at or beyond 42 weeks of gestation. The American College of Obstetricians and Gynecologists have recommended further division to early term from 37 weeks up to 39 weeks, full term 39 weeks up to 41 weeks, and late term 41 weeks up to 42 weeks. The terms preterm and post-term have largely replaced the earlier terms premature and postmature, which related historically to the infant's size and state of development rather than to the stage of pregnancy.

== Demographics ==
About 213 million pregnancies occurred in 2012, of which 190 million (89%) were in the developing world and 23 million (11%) were in the developed world. The number of pregnancies in women aged between 15 and 44 is 133 per 1,000 women. Pregnancy rates are 140 per 1000 women of childbearing age in the developing world and 94 per 1000 in the developed world. The rate of pregnancy, as well as the ages at which it occurs, differ by country and region. It is influenced by a number of factors, such as cultural, social and religious norms; access to contraception; and rates of education. The total fertility rate (TFR) in 2024 was estimated to be highest in Niger (6.64 children/woman) and lowest in South Korea (1.12 children/woman).

About 10% to 15% of recognized pregnancies end in miscarriage. In 2016, complications of pregnancy resulted in 230,600 maternal deaths, down from 377,000 deaths in 1990. Common causes include bleeding, infections, hypertensive diseases of pregnancy, obstructed labour, miscarriage, abortion, or ectopic pregnancy. Globally, 44% of pregnancies are unplanned. Over half (56%) of unplanned pregnancies are aborted. In countries where abortion is prohibited, or only carried out in circumstances where the mother's life is at risk, 48% of unplanned pregnancies are aborted illegally. Compared to the rate in countries where abortion is legal, at 69%. Among unintended pregnancies in the United States, 60% of the women used birth control to some extent during the month pregnancy had begun.

In the United States, a woman's educational attainment and her marital status are historically correlated with childbearing: the percentage of women unmarried at the time of first birth drops with increasing educational level. Three studies conducted between 2015 and 2018 indicate a large fraction (~80%) of women without a high school diploma or local equivalent in the US are unmarried at the time of their first birth. By contrast, the same studies indicated fewer women with a bachelor's degree or higher (~24%) have their first child while unmarried. However, this phenomenon also has a strong generational component: a 1996 study found 48.2% of US women without a bachelor's degree had their first child whilst unmarried, and only 4% of women with a bachelor's degree had their first child whilst unmarried. These studies indicate a rising trend for US women of all educational levels to be unmarried at the time of their first birth.

=== Teenage pregnancy ===
Teenage pregnancy is also known as adolescent pregnancy. The WHO defines adolescence as the period between the ages of 10 and 19 years. Adolescents face higher health risks than women who give birth at age 20 to 24 and their infants are at a higher risk for preterm birth, low birth weight, and other severe neonatal conditions. Their children continue to face greater challenges, both behavioral and physical, throughout their lives. Teenage pregnancies are also related to social issues, including social stigma, lower educational levels, and poverty. Female adolescents are often in abusive relationships at the time of their conceiving.

== Diagnosis ==
Penile–vaginal sex is typically the cause of pregnancy, although myths regarding other sexual acts persist, particularly in populations that received poor sex education such as abstinence-only. Pregnancy can also be the result of assisted reproductive technology.

The beginning of pregnancy may be detected based on the woman's symptoms or by using pregnancy tests. Denial of pregnancy by the woman is a common condition with serious health implications. About 1 in 475 denials will last until around the 20th week of pregnancy. Denial persisting until delivery occurs in about 1 in 2,500 cases. Conversely, some non-pregnant women have a strong belief that they are pregnant along with some physical changes. This condition is known as a false pregnancy.

=== Symptoms and signs ===
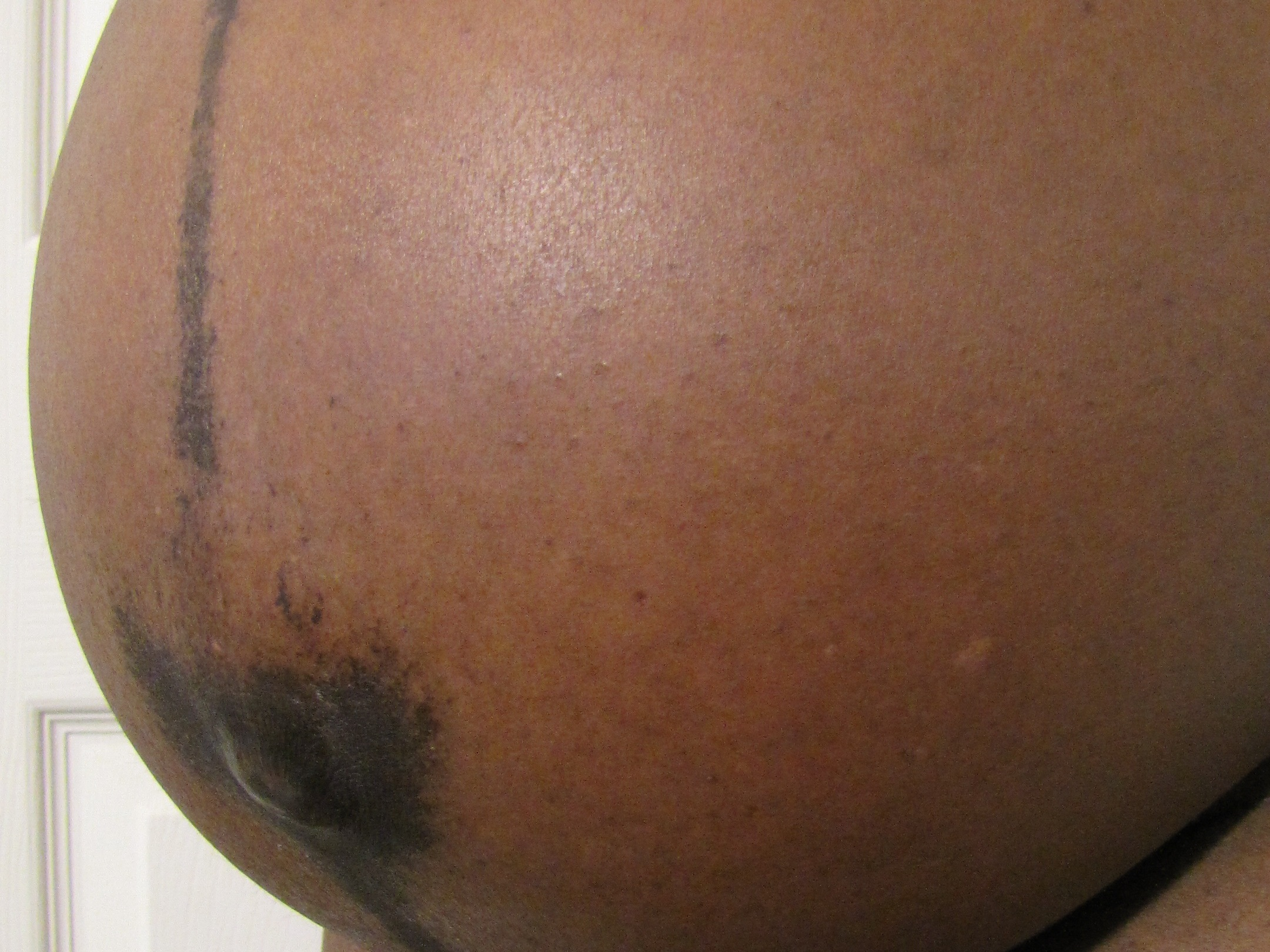
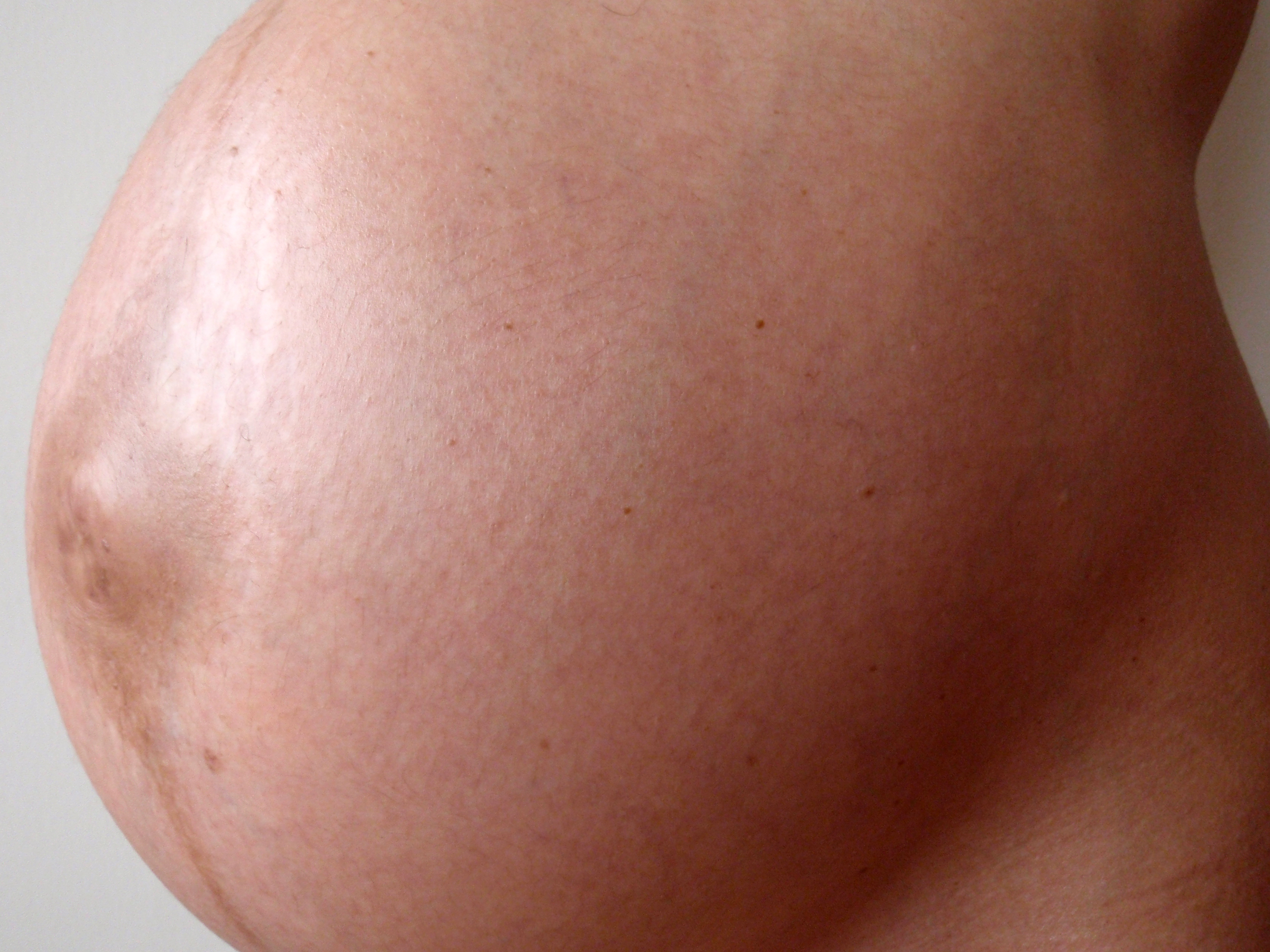
Linea nigra in darker and lighter skinned women

Most pregnant women experience a number of symptoms which can signify pregnancy such as breast tenderness or morning sickness. A number of early medical signs are associated with pregnancy. Physical signs of pregnancy include:

- the presence of human chorionic gonadotropin (hCG) in the blood and urine
- missed menstrual period
- implantation bleeding that occurs at implantation of the embryo in the uterus during the third or fourth week after last menstrual period
- increased basal body temperature sustained for over two weeks after ovulation
- Chadwick's sign (bluish discolouration of the cervix, vagina, and vulva)
- Goodell's sign (softening of the vaginal portion of the cervix)
- Hegar's sign (softening of the uterine isthmus)
- Pigmentation of the linea alba, called linea nigra (darkening of the skin in a midline of the abdomen, resulting from hormonal changes, usually appearing around the middle of pregnancy).
- Darkening of the nipples and areolas due to an increase in hormones
- Stretch marks
- Varicose veins
- Peripheral edema (swelling of legs, feet, and ankles)
- Gum bleeding
- Melasma

Other common symptoms include constipation, back pain, pelvic girdle pain, headaches, and food cravings or food aversions. Pregnant women may also experience urinary tract infections, increased urinary frequency, worsened sleep quality, increased dream recall, and nightmares. In later pregnancy, hemorrhoids are more common. Each person's pregnancy can be different and many women do not experience all of the common signs and symptoms. The usual signs and symptoms of pregnancy do not significantly interfere with activities of daily living or pose a health-threat to the mother or fetus. Complications during pregnancy can cause other more severe symptoms, such as those associated with anemia.

=== Biomarkers ===
Pregnancy detection can be accomplished using one or more pregnancy tests, which detect hormones generated by the newly formed placenta, serving as biomarkers of pregnancy. Blood and urine tests can detect pregnancy by 11 and 14 days, respectively, after fertilization. Blood pregnancy tests are more sensitive than urine tests (giving fewer false negatives). Home pregnancy tests are urine tests, and normally detect a pregnancy 12 to 15 days after fertilization. A quantitative blood test can determine approximately the date the embryo was fertilized because hCG levels double every 36 to 72 hours before 8 weeks' gestation. A single test of progesterone levels can also help determine how likely a fetus will survive in those with a threatened miscarriage (bleeding in early pregnancy), but only if the ultrasound result was inconclusive.

=== Ultrasound ===
Obstetric ultrasonography can detect fetal abnormalities, detect multiple pregnancies, and improve gestational dating at 24 weeks. The resultant estimated gestational age and due date of the fetus are slightly more accurate than methods based on last menstrual period. Ultrasound is used to measure the nuchal fold in order to screen for Down syndrome.

=== Medical imaging ===
CT scanning (volume rendered in this case) confers a radiation dose to the developing fetus.

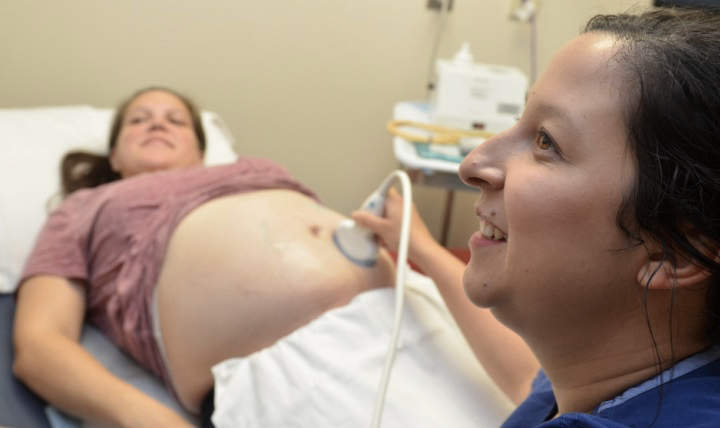
A pregnant woman undergoing an ultrasound. Ultrasound is used to check on the growth and development of the fetus.

Medical imaging may be indicated in pregnancy because of pregnancy complications, disease, or routine prenatal care. Medical ultrasonography including obstetric ultrasonography, and magnetic resonance imaging (MRI) without contrast agents are not associated with any risk for the mother or the fetus, and are the imaging techniques of choice for pregnant women. Projectional radiography, CT scan and nuclear medicine imaging result in some degree of ionizing radiation exposure, but in most cases the absorbed doses are not associated with harm to the baby. At higher dosages or frequency, effects can include miscarriage, birth defects and intellectual disability.

== Timeline ==
Comparison of dating systems for a typical pregnancy
Event	Gestational age (from the start of the last menstrual period)	Fertilization age	Implantation age
Menstrual period begins	Day 1 of pregnancy	Not pregnant	Not pregnant
Has sex and ovulates	2 weeks pregnant	Not pregnant	Not pregnant
Fertilization; cleavage stage begins	Day 15	Day 1	Not pregnant
Implantation of blastocyst begins	Day 20	Day 6	Day 0
Implantation finished	Day 26	Day 12	Day 6 (or Day 0)
Embryo stage begins; also, first missed period	4 weeks	Day 15	Day 9
Primitive heart function can be detected	5 weeks, 5 days	Day 26	Day 20
Fetal stage begins	10 weeks, 1 day	8 weeks, 1 day	7 weeks, 2 days
First trimester ends	13 weeks	11 weeks	10 weeks
Second trimester ends	26 weeks	24 weeks	23 weeks
Childbirth	39–40 weeks	37–38 weeks	36–37 weeks

The chronology of pregnancy is, unless otherwise specified, generally given as gestational age, where the starting point is the beginning of the woman's last menstrual period (LMP), or the corresponding age of the gestation as estimated by a more accurate method if available. This model means that the woman is counted as being "pregnant" two weeks before conception and three weeks before implantation. Sometimes, timing may also use the fertilization age, which is the age of the embryo since conception.

=== Start of gestational age ===
The American Congress of Obstetricians and Gynecologists recommends the following methods to calculate gestational age:

- Directly calculating the days since the beginning of the last menstrual period.
- Early obstetric ultrasound, comparing the size of an embryo or fetus to that of a reference group of pregnancies of known gestational age (such as calculated from last menstrual periods), and using the mean gestational age of other embryos or fetuses of the same size. If the gestational age as calculated from an early ultrasound is contradictory to the one calculated directly from the last menstrual period, it is still the one from the early ultrasound that is used for the rest of the pregnancy.
- In case of in vitro fertilization, calculating days since oocyte retrieval or co-incubation and adding 14 days.

=== Trimesters ===
Pregnancy is divided into three trimesters, each lasting for approximately three months. The exact length of each trimester can vary between sources.

- The first trimester begins with the start of gestational age as described above, that is, the beginning of week 1, or 0 weeks + 0 days of gestational age (GA). It ends at week 12 (11 weeks + 6 days of GA) or end of week 14 (13 weeks + 6 days of GA).
- The second trimester is defined as starting, between the beginning of week 13 (12 weeks +0 days of GA) and beginning of week 15 (14 weeks + 0 days of GA). It ends at the end of week 27 (26 weeks + 6 days of GA) or end of week 28 (27 weeks + 6 days of GA).
- The third trimester is defined as starting, between the beginning of week 28 (27 weeks + 0 days of GA) or beginning of week 29 (28 weeks + 0 days of GA). It lasts until childbirth.

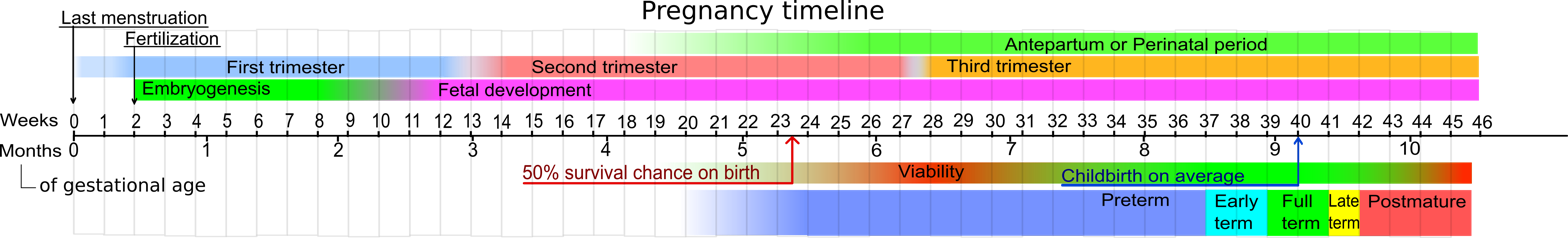
Timeline of pregnancy, including (from top to bottom): Trimesters, embryo/fetus development, gestational age in weeks and months, viability and maturity stages

=== Estimation of due date ===
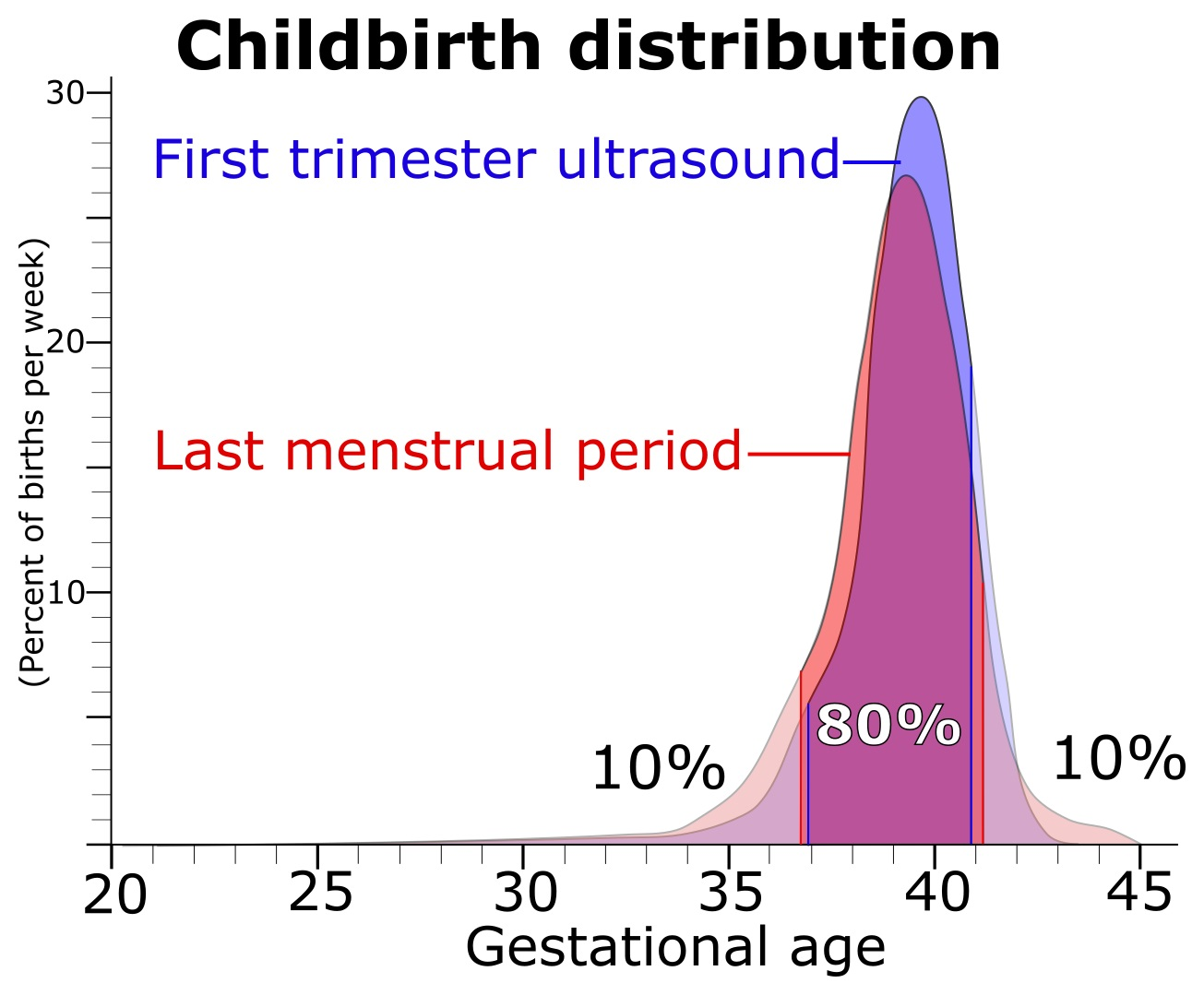
Distribution of gestational age at childbirth among singleton live births, given both when gestational age is estimated by first trimester ultrasound and directly by last menstrual period. Roughly 80% of births occur between 37 and 41 weeks of gestational age.

Due date estimation basically follows two steps:

- Determination of which time point is to be used as origin for gestational age, as described in the section above.
- Adding the estimated gestational age at childbirth to the above time point. Childbirth on average occurs at a gestational age of 280 days (40 weeks), which is therefore often used as a standard estimation for individual pregnancies. However, alternative durations as well as more individualized methods have also been suggested.

The American College of Obstetricians and Gynecologists divides full term into three divisions:

- Early-term: 37 weeks and 0 days through 38 weeks and 6 days
- Full-term: 39 weeks and 0 days through 40 weeks and 6 days
- Late-term: 41 weeks and 0 days through 41 weeks and 6 days
- Post-term: greater than or equal to 42 weeks and 0 days

Naegele's rule is a standard way of calculating the due date for a pregnancy when assuming a gestational age of 280 days at childbirth. The rule estimates the expected date of delivery (EDD) by adding a year, subtracting three months, and adding seven days to the origin of gestational age. Alternatively there are mobile apps, which essentially always give consistent estimations compared to each other and correct for leap year, while pregnancy wheels made of paper can differ from each other by 7 days and generally do not correct for leap year.

Furthermore, actual childbirth has only a certain probability of occurring within the limits of the estimated due date. A study of singleton live births came to the result that childbirth has a standard deviation of 14 days when gestational age is estimated by first trimester ultrasound, and 16 days when estimated directly by last menstrual period.

== Physiology ==
=== Capacity ===
Fertility and fecundity are the respective capacities to fertilize and establish a clinical pregnancy and have a live birth. Infertility is an impaired ability to establish a clinical pregnancy and sterility is the permanent inability to establish a clinical pregnancy.

The capacity for pregnancy depends on the reproductive system, its development and its variation, as well as on the condition of a person. Anyone who has a functioning female reproductive system, regardless of intersex or transgender identity, is capable of becoming pregnant.

Some people are not capable of becoming pregnant, even with advanced assisted reproductive technology. In some cases, someone might produce viable eggs, but might not have a womb or none that can sufficiently gestate, in which case they will not be able to become pregnant or sustain the pregnancy. Surrogacy is their only option for having genetic children.

=== Initiation ===
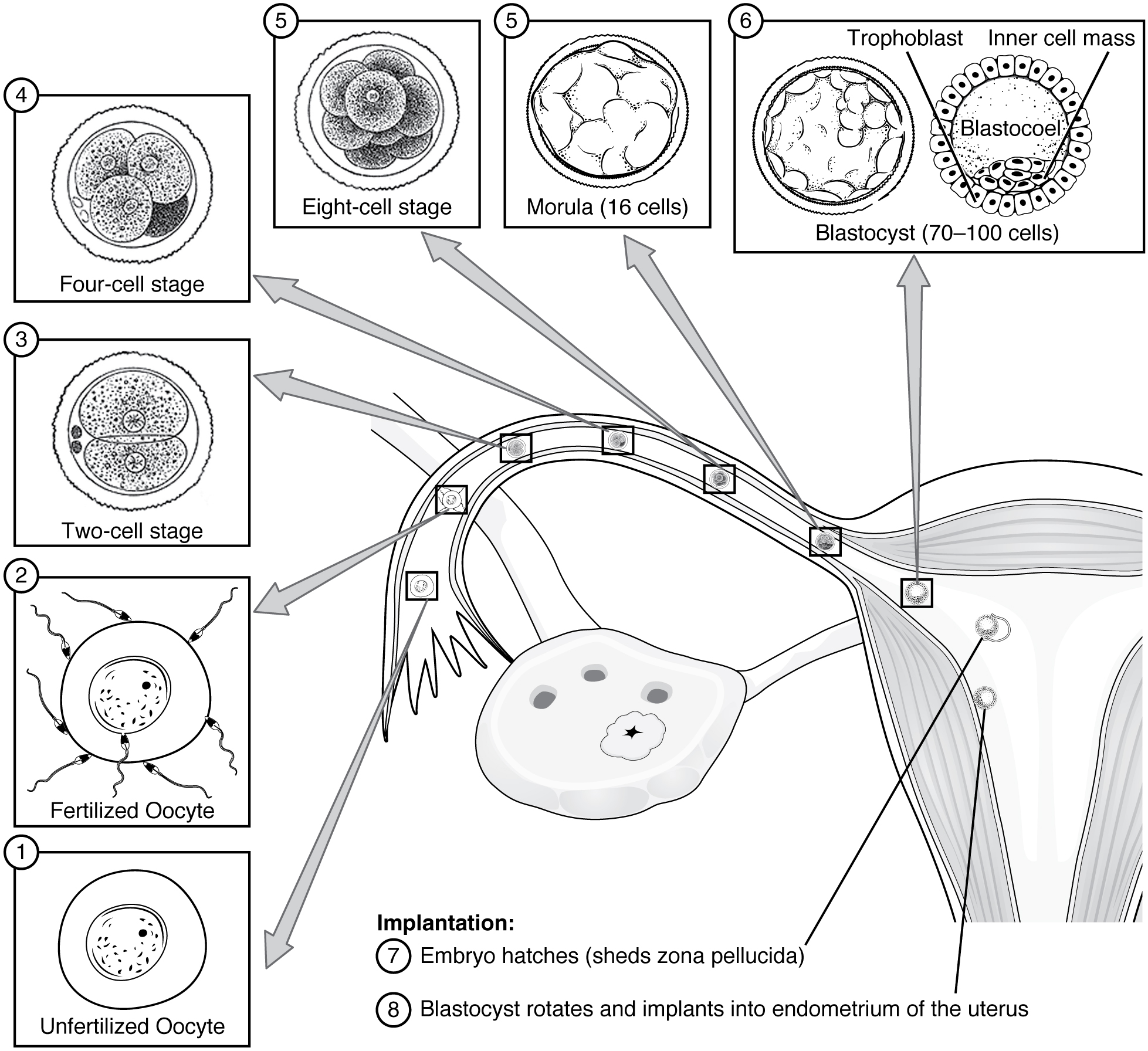
Fertilization and implantation in humans

Through an interplay of hormones that includes follicle stimulating hormone that stimulates folliculogenesis and oogenesis creates a mature egg cell, the female gamete. Fertilization is the event where the egg cell fuses with the male gamete, spermatozoon. After the point of fertilization, the fused product of the female and male gamete is referred to as a zygote or fertilized egg. The fusion of female and male gametes usually occurs following the act of sexual intercourse. Pregnancy rates for sexual intercourse are highest during the menstrual cycle time from some 5 days before until 1 to 2 days after ovulation. Fertilization can also occur by assisted reproductive technology such as artificial insemination and in vitro fertilisation.

Fertilization (conception) is sometimes used as the initiation of pregnancy, with the derived age being termed fertilization age. Fertilization usually occurs about two weeks before the next expected menstrual period.

A third point in time is also considered by some people to be the true beginning of a pregnancy: This is time of implantation, when the future fetus attaches to the lining of the uterus. This is about a week to ten days after fertilization.

=== Development of embryo and fetus ===
The initial stages of human embryogenesis

The sperm and the egg cell, which has been released from one of the female's two ovaries, unite in one of the two fallopian tubes. The fertilized egg, known as a zygote, then moves toward the uterus, a journey that can take up to a week to complete. Cell division begins approximately 24 to 36 hours after the female and male cells unite. Cell division continues at a rapid rate and the cells then develop into what is known as a blastocyst. The blastocyst arrives at the uterus and attaches to the uterine wall, a process known as implantation.

The development of the mass of cells that will become the infant is called embryogenesis during the first approximately ten weeks of gestation. During this time, cells begin to differentiate into the various body systems. The basic outlines of the organ, body, and nervous systems are established. By the end of the embryonic stage, the beginnings of features such as fingers, eyes, mouth, and ears become visible. Also during this time, there is development of structures important to the support of the embryo, including the placenta and umbilical cord. The placenta connects the developing embryo to the uterine wall to allow nutrient uptake, waste elimination, and gas exchange via the mother's blood supply. The umbilical cord is the connecting cord from the embryo or fetus to the placenta.

After about ten weeks of gestational age—which is the same as eight weeks after conception—the embryo becomes known as a fetus. At the beginning of the fetal stage, the risk of miscarriage decreases sharply. At this stage, a fetus is about 30 mm (1.2 inches) in length, the heartbeat is seen via ultrasound, and the fetus makes involuntary motions. During continued fetal development, the early body systems, and structures that were established in the embryonic stage continue to develop. Sex organs begin to appear during the third month of gestation. The fetus continues to grow in both weight and length, although the majority of the physical growth occurs in the last weeks of pregnancy.

Electrical brain activity is first detected at the end of week 5 of gestation, but as in brain-dead patients, it is primitive neural activity rather than the beginning of conscious brain activity. Synapses do not begin to form until week 17. Neural connections between the sensory cortex and thalamus develop as early as 24 weeks' gestational age, but the first evidence of their function does not occur until around 30 weeks, when minimal consciousness, dreaming, and the ability to feel pain emerges.

Although the fetus begins to move during the first trimester, it is not until the second trimester that movement, known as quickening, can be felt. This typically happens in the fourth month, more specifically in the 20th to 21st week, or by the 19th week if the woman has been pregnant before. It is common for some women not to feel the fetus move until much later. During the second trimester, when the body size changes, maternity clothes may be worn.

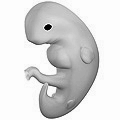
Embryo at 4 weeks after fertilization (gestational age of 6 weeks)

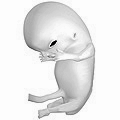
Fetus at 8 weeks after fertilization (gestational age of 10 weeks)

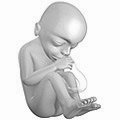
Fetus at 18 weeks after fertilization (gestational age of 20 weeks)

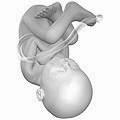
Fetus at 38 weeks after fertilization (gestational age of 40 weeks)
Relative size in 1st month (simplified illustration)

Relative size in 3rd month (simplified illustration)

Relative size in 5th month (simplified illustration)

Relative size in 9th month (simplified illustration)

=== Maternal changes ===
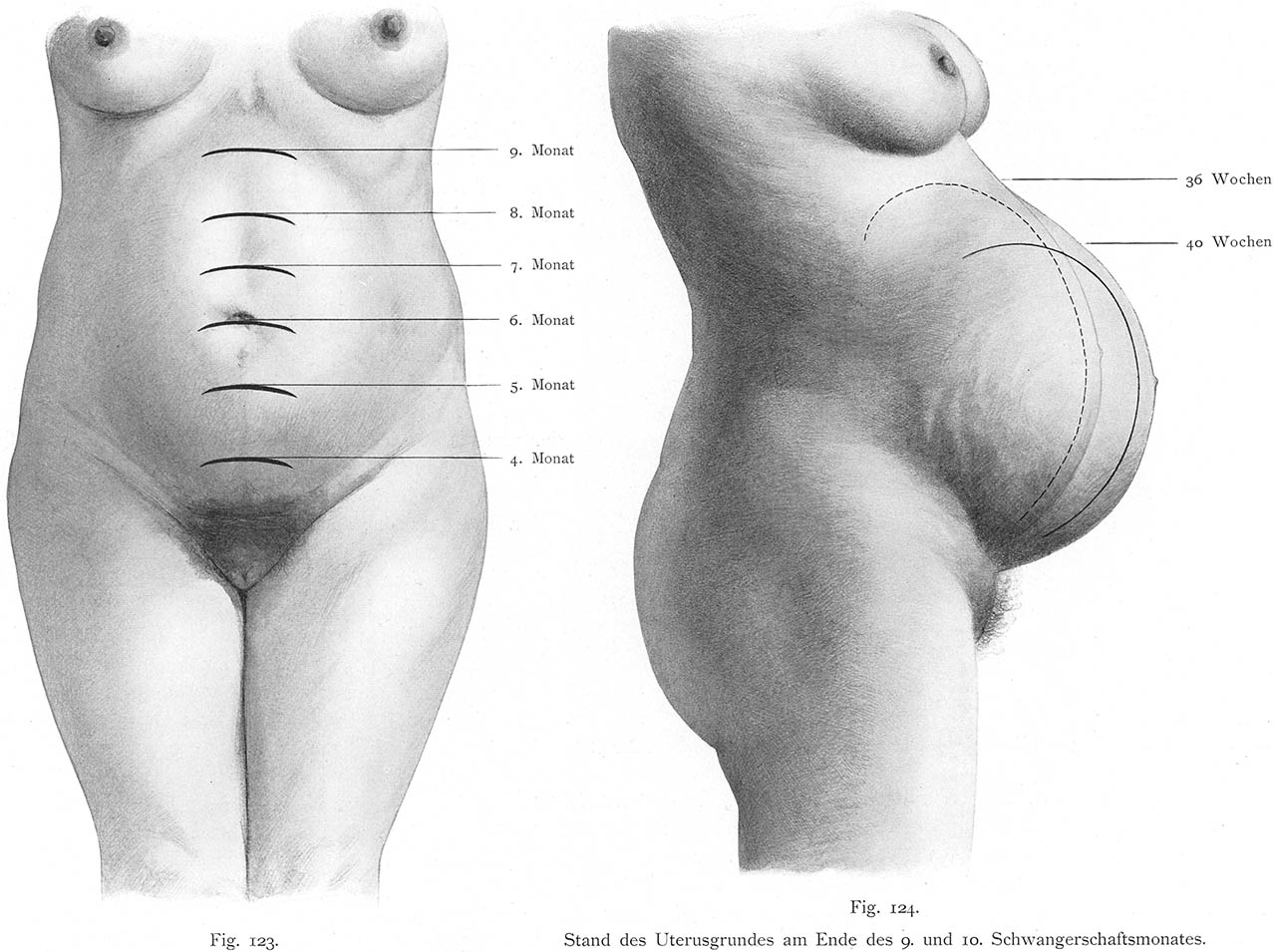
The uterus expands making up a larger and larger portion of the abdomen. During the final stages of gestation the uterus may drop to a lower position.

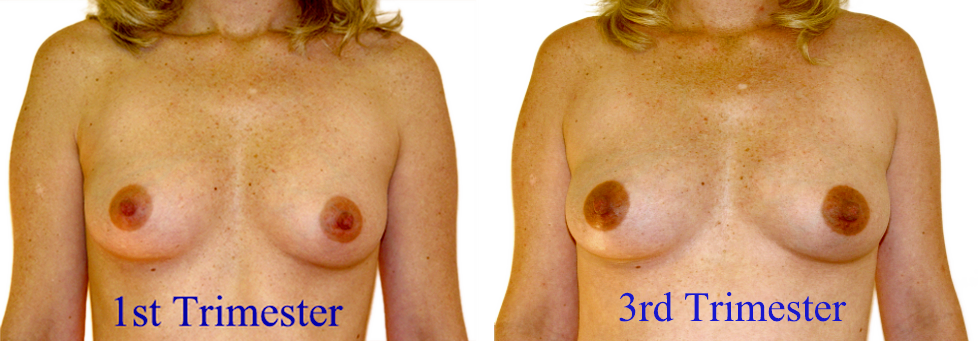
Breast changes as seen during pregnancy. The areolae are larger and darker.

During pregnancy, a woman undergoes many normal physiological changes, including behavioral, cardiovascular, hematologic, metabolic, renal, and respiratory changes. Increases in blood sugar, breathing, and cardiac output are all required. Levels of progesterone and estrogens rise continually throughout pregnancy, suppressing the hypothalamic axis and therefore the menstrual cycle. A full-term pregnancy at an early age (less than 25 years) reduces the risk of breast, ovarian, and endometrial cancer, and the risk declines further with each additional full-term pregnancy.

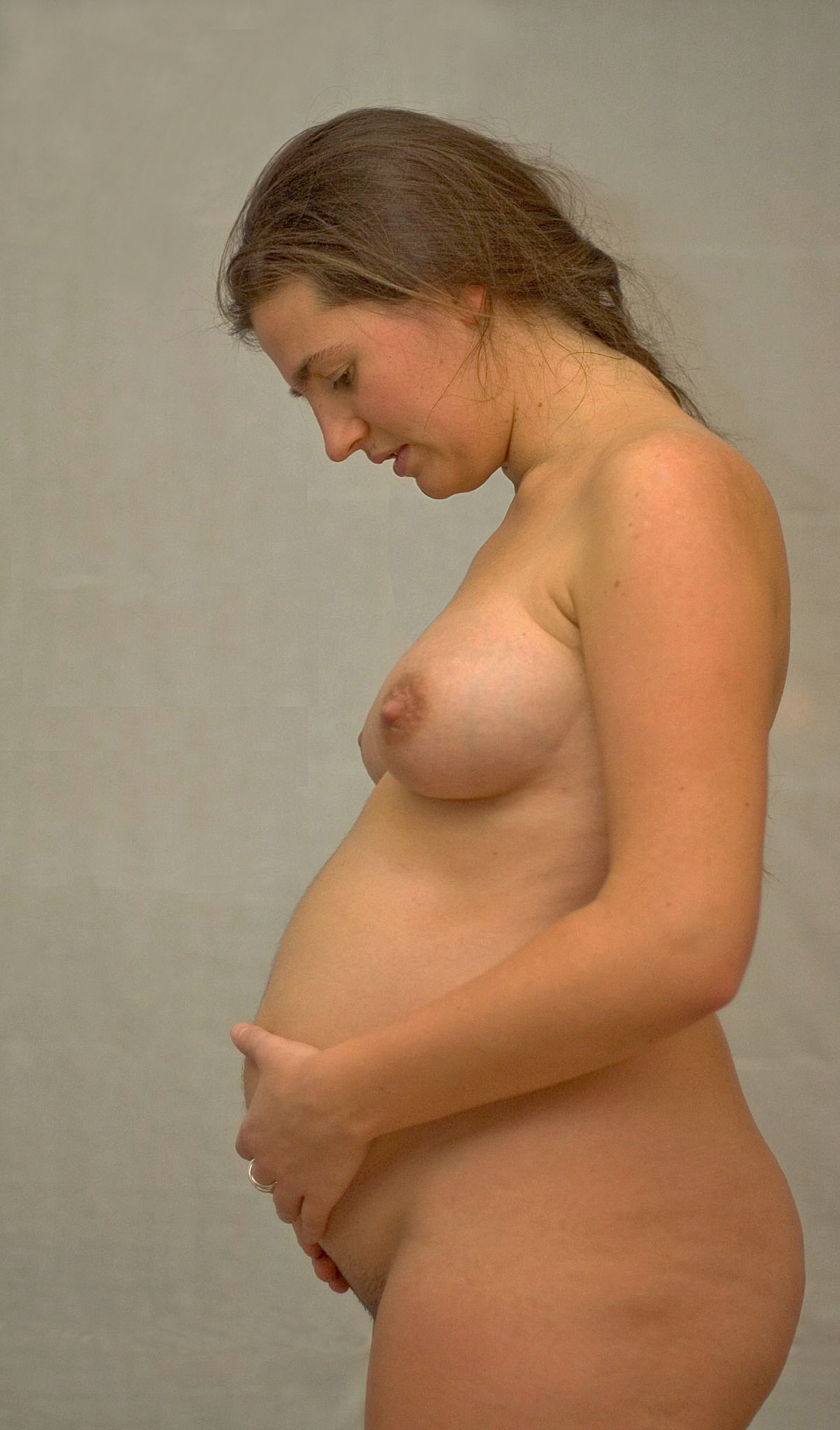
End of second trimester + 2 weeks (26 weeks of pregnancy)

The fetus is genetically different from its mother and can therefore be viewed as an unusually successful allograft. The main reason for this success is increased immune tolerance during pregnancy, which prevents the mother's body from mounting an immune system response against certain triggers. A Rho(D) immune globulin shot is recommended for women with RhD negative blood carrying a RhD positive fetus as a preventative measure against Rhesus disease.

During the first trimester, minute ventilation increases by 40 percent. The womb will grow to the size of a lemon by eight weeks. Many symptoms and discomforts of pregnancy, such as nausea and tender breasts, appear in the first trimester. Braxton Hicks contractions are sporadic uterine contractions that may start around six weeks into a pregnancy but are usually not felt until the second or third trimester.

Pregnant women have higher total blood volume that increases throughout the duration of the pregnancy. It is during the third trimester that maternal activity and sleep positions may affect fetal development due to restricted blood flow. For instance, the enlarged uterus may impede blood flow by compressing the vena cava when lying flat, a condition that can be relieved by lying on the left side.

Most weight gain takes place during the third trimester. A pregnant woman's navel may become convex ("popping" out) during this time. Her abdomen will expand and change in shape as the fetus turns in a downward position nearing childbirth. Head engagement, also called "lightening" or "dropping", occurs as the fetal head descends into a cephalic presentation. While it relieves pressure on the upper abdomen and gives a renewed ease in breathing, it also severely reduces bladder capacity, resulting in a need to void more frequently, and increases pressure on the pelvic floor and the rectum. It is not possible to predict when lightening will occur. In a first pregnancy it may happen a few weeks before the due date, though it may happen later or even not until labour begins, as is typical with subsequent pregnancies.

=== Childbirth ===
Childbirth, referred to as labour and delivery in the medical field, is the process whereby an infant is born.

A woman is considered to be in labour when she begins experiencing regular uterine contractions, accompanied by changes of her cervix—primarily effacement and dilation. While childbirth is widely experienced as painful, some women do report painless labours, while others find that concentrating on the birth helps to quicken labour and lessen the sensations. Most births are successful vaginal births, but sometimes complications arise and a woman may undergo a cesarean section.

During the time immediately after birth, both the mother and the baby are hormonally cued to bond, the mother through the release of oxytocin, a hormone also released during breastfeeding. Studies show that skin-to-skin contact between a mother and her newborn immediately after birth is beneficial for both the mother and baby. A review done by the World Health Organization found that skin-to-skin contact between mothers and babies after birth reduces crying, improves mother–infant interaction, and helps mothers to breastfeed successfully. They recommend that neonates be allowed to bond with the mother during their first two hours after birth, the period that they tend to be more alert than in the following hours of early life.

==== Childbirth maturity stages ====
Stages of pregnancy term
stage	starts	ends
Preterm	-	at 37 weeks
Early term	37 weeks	39 weeks
Full term	39 weeks	41 weeks
Late term	41 weeks	42 weeks
Postterm	42 weeks	-

In the ideal childbirth, labour begins on its own when a woman is "at term". Events before completion of 37 weeks are considered preterm. Preterm birth is associated with a range of complications and should be avoided if possible.

Sometimes if a woman's water breaks or she has contractions before 39 weeks, birth is unavoidable. However, spontaneous birth after 37 weeks is considered term and is not associated with the same risks of a preterm birth. Planned birth before 39 weeks by caesarean section or labour induction, although "at term", results in an increased risk of complications. This is from factors including underdeveloped lungs of newborns, infection due to underdeveloped immune system, feeding problems due to underdeveloped brain, and jaundice from underdeveloped liver.

Babies born between 39 and 41 weeks' gestation have better outcomes than babies born either before or after this range. This special time period is called "full term". Whenever possible, waiting for labour to begin on its own in this time period is best for the health of the mother and baby. The decision to perform an induction must be made after weighing the risks and benefits, but is safer after 39 weeks.

Events after 42 weeks are considered postterm. When a pregnancy exceeds 42 weeks, the risk of complications for both the woman and the fetus increases significantly. Therefore, in an otherwise uncomplicated pregnancy, obstetricians usually prefer to induce labour at some stage between 41 and 42 weeks.

=== Postnatal period ===
The postpartum period also referred to as the puerperium, is the postnatal period that begins immediately after delivery and extends for about six weeks. During this period, the mother's body begins the return to pre-pregnancy conditions that includes changes in hormone levels and uterus size.

== Management ==
Share of mothers receiving at least one antenatal visit during pregnancy

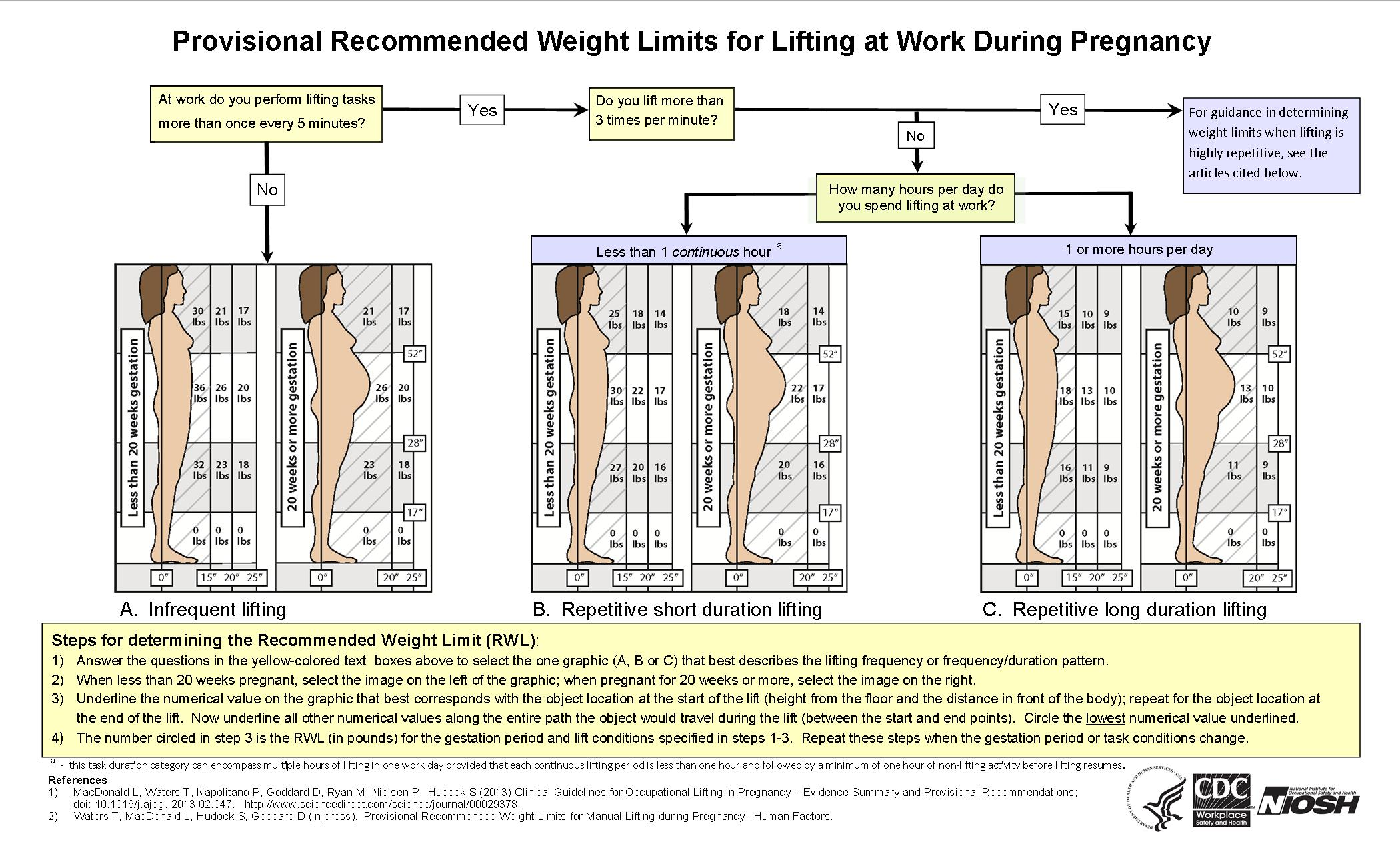
Flowchart showing the recommended weight limits for lifting at work during pregnancy as a function of lifting frequency, weeks of gestation, and the position of the lifted object relative to the lifter's body.

=== Prenatal care ===
Pre-conception counseling is care that is provided to a woman or couple to discuss conception, pregnancy, current health issues and recommendations for the period before pregnancy.

Prenatal medical care is the medical and nursing care recommended for women during pregnancy, time intervals and exact goals of each visit differ by country. Women who are high risk have better outcomes if they are seen regularly and frequently by a medical professional than women who are low risk. A woman can be labeled as high risk for different reasons including previous complications in pregnancy, complications in the current pregnancy, current medical diseases, or social issues.

The aim of good prenatal care is prevention, early identification, and treatment of any medical complications. A basic prenatal visit consists of measurement of blood pressure, fundal height, weight and fetal heart rate, checking for symptoms of labour, and guidance for what to expect next. Healthcare providers may screen for domestic violence during pregnancy, particularly in regards to reproductive coercion.

=== Nutrition ===
Nutrition during pregnancy is important to ensure healthy growth of the fetus. Nutrition during pregnancy is different from the non-pregnant state. There are increased energy requirements and specific micronutrient requirements. Women benefit from education to encourage a balanced energy and protein intake during pregnancy. Some women may need professional medical advice if their diet is affected by medical conditions, food allergies, or specific religious or ethical beliefs. Further studies are needed to access the effect of dietary advice to prevent gestational diabetes, although low quality evidence suggests some benefit. Adequate periconceptional (time before and right after conception) folic acid (also called folate or Vitamin B_{9}) intake has been shown to decrease the risk of fetal neural tube defects, such as spina bifida. L-methylfolate, the bioavailable form of folate is also considered acceptable to take. L-methylfolate is best used by the 40% to 60% of the population with genetic polymorphisms that reduce or impair conversion of folic acid into its active form. The neural tube develops during the first 28 days of pregnancy, a urine pregnancy test is not usually positive until 14 days post-conception, explaining the necessity to guarantee adequate folate intake before conception. Folate is abundant in green leafy vegetables, legumes, and citrus. In the United States and Canada, most wheat products (flour, noodles) are fortified with folic acid.

=== Weight gain ===
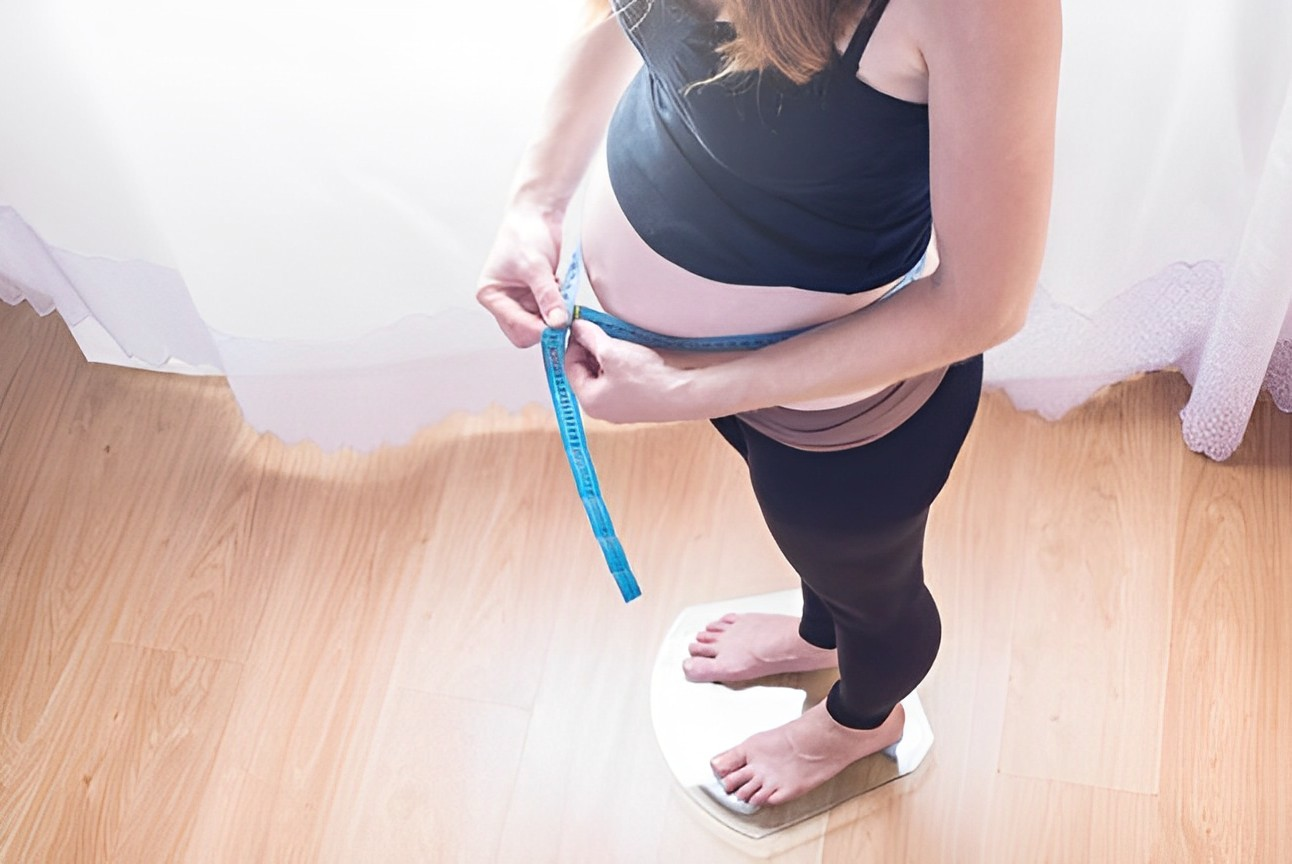
Measurement of the belly being performed by a pregnant woman during her pregnancy

The amount of healthy weight gain during a pregnancy varies. Weight gain is related to the weight of the baby, the placenta, extra circulatory fluid, larger tissues, and fat and protein stores. Most needed weight gain occurs later in pregnancy.

The Institute of Medicine recommends an overall pregnancy weight gain for those of normal weight (body mass index of 18.5–24.9), of 11.3–15.9 kg (25–35 pounds) having a singleton pregnancy. Women who are underweight (BMI of less than 18.5), should gain between 12.7 and 18 kg (28–40 lb), while those who are overweight (BMI of 25–29.9) are advised to gain between 6.8 and 11.3 kg (15–25 lb) and those who are obese (BMI ≥ 30) should gain between 5–9 kg (11–20 lb). These values reference the expectations for a term pregnancy.

During pregnancy, insufficient or excessive weight gain can compromise the health of the mother and fetus. The most effective intervention for weight gain in underweight women is not clear. Being or becoming overweight in pregnancy increases the risk of complications for mother and fetus, including cesarean section, gestational hypertension, pre-eclampsia, macrosomia and shoulder dystocia. Excessive weight gain can make losing weight after the pregnancy difficult. Some of these complications are risk factors for stroke.

Around 50% of women of childbearing age in developed countries like the United Kingdom are overweight or obese before pregnancy. Diet modification is the most effective way to reduce weight gain and associated risks in pregnancy.

=== Medication ===
Drugs used during pregnancy can have temporary or permanent effects on the fetus. Anything (including drugs) that can cause permanent deformities in the fetus are labeled as teratogens. In the U.S., drugs were classified into categories A, B, C, D and X based on the Food and Drug Administration (FDA) rating system to provide therapeutic guidance based on potential benefits and fetal risks. Drugs, including some multivitamins, that have demonstrated no fetal risks after controlled studies in humans are classified as Category A. On the other hand, drugs like thalidomide with proven fetal risks that outweigh all benefits are classified as Category X.

=== Recreational drugs ===
The use of recreational drugs in pregnancy can cause various pregnancy complications.

- Alcoholic drinks consumed during pregnancy can cause one or more fetal alcohol spectrum disorders. According to the CDC, there is no known safe amount of alcohol during pregnancy and no safe time to drink during pregnancy, including before a woman knows that she is pregnant.
- Tobacco smoking during pregnancy can cause a wide range of behavioral, neurological, and physical difficulties. Smoking during pregnancy causes twice the risk of premature rupture of membranes, placental abruption and placenta previa. Smoking is associated with 30% higher odds of preterm birth.
- Prenatal cocaine exposure is associated with premature birth, birth defects and attention deficit disorder.
- Prenatal methamphetamine exposure can cause premature birth and congenital abnormalities. Short-term neonatal outcomes in methamphetamine babies show small deficits in infant neurobehavioral function and growth restriction. Long-term effects in terms of impaired brain development may also be caused by methamphetamine use.
- Cannabis in pregnancy has been shown to be teratogenic in large doses in animals, but has not shown any teratogenic effects in humans.

=== Exposure to toxins ===
A video describing research on N95 respirator use during advanced pregnancy

Intrauterine exposure to environmental toxins in pregnancy has the potential to cause adverse effects on prenatal development, and to cause pregnancy complications. Air pollution has been associated with low birth weight infants. Conditions of particular severity in pregnancy include mercury poisoning and lead poisoning. To minimize exposure to environmental toxins, the American College of Nurse-Midwives recommends: checking whether the home has lead paint, washing all fresh fruits and vegetables thoroughly and buying organic produce, and avoiding cleaning products labeled "toxic" or any product with a warning on the label.

Pregnant women can also be exposed to toxins in the workplace, including airborne particles. The effects of wearing an N95 filtering facepiece respirator are similar for pregnant women as for non-pregnant women, and wearing a respirator for one hour does not affect the fetal heart rate.

=== Death by violence ===
Pregnant women or those who have recently given birth in the U.S. are more likely to be murdered than to die from obstetric causes. These homicides are a combination of intimate partner violence and firearms. Health authorities have called the violence "a health emergency for pregnant women", but say that pregnancy-related homicides are preventable if healthcare providers identify those women at risk and offer assistance to them.

=== Sexual activity ===
Most women can continue to engage in sexual activity, including sexual intercourse, throughout pregnancy. Research suggests that during pregnancy both sexual desire and frequency of sexual relations decrease during the first and third trimester, with a rise during the second trimester. Sex during pregnancy is low-risk except when the healthcare provider advises that sexual intercourse be avoided for particular medical reasons. For a healthy pregnant woman, there is no single safe or right way to have sex during pregnancy.

=== Exercise ===
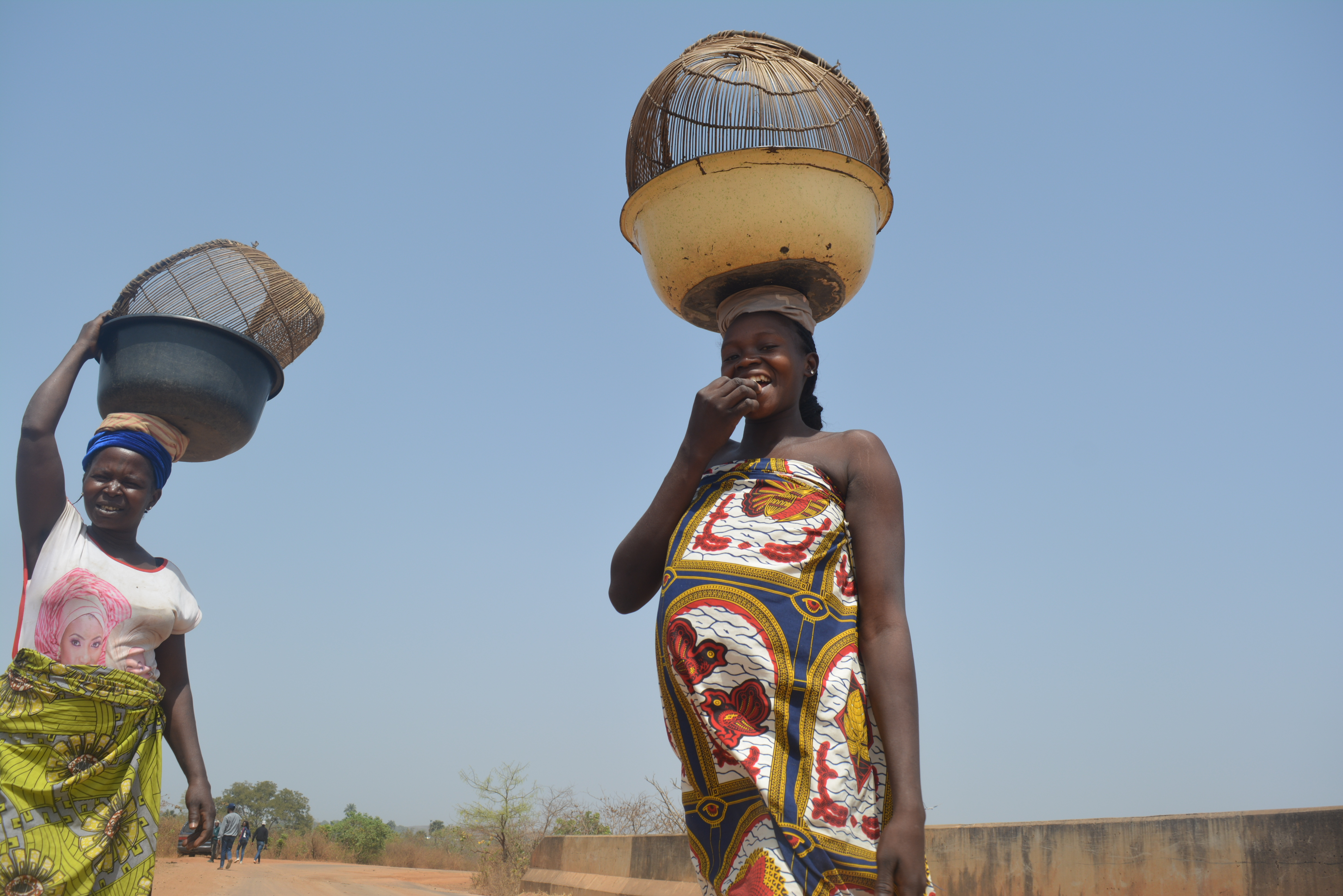
A pregnant woman and her colleague returning from fishing, Gurara River bridge, Kachia, Nigeria

Regular aerobic exercise during pregnancy appears to improve (or maintain) physical fitness. Physical exercise during pregnancy appears to decrease the need for C-section and reduce time in labour, and even vigorous exercise carries no significant risks to babies while providing significant health benefits to the mother. Studies show that performing light moderate intensity and strength exercises while pregnant does not harm the mother's cardiovascular system and may limit excessive weight gain.

The American College of Sports and Medicine recommends pregnant women should participate in at least 150 minutes/week of moderate exercise. These forms of exercise should avoid heavy lifting, hot temperatures, and high impact sports. The Clinical Practice Obstetrics Committee of Canada recommends that "All women without contraindications should be encouraged to participate in aerobic and strength-conditioning exercises as part of a healthy lifestyle during their pregnancy". Although an upper level of safe exercise intensity has not been established, women who were regular exercisers before pregnancy and who have uncomplicated pregnancies should be able to engage in high intensity exercise programs without a higher risk of prematurity, lower birth weight, or gestational weight gain. In general, participation in a wide range of recreational activities appears to be safe, with the avoidance of those with a high risk of falling such as horseback riding or skiing or those that carry a risk of abdominal trauma, such as soccer or hockey.

Bed rest, outside of research studies, is not recommended as there is potential harm and no evidence of benefit.

==== High intensity exercise ====
During pregnancy, women can experience a loss of postural stability, pelvic incontinence, back pain, and fatigue, among other symptoms. Resistance training has been found to reduce pregnancy symptoms and reduce postpartum complications. Provided that women also regularly participate in low-impact training, strength training can improve pelvic girdle pain severity postpartum. When incorporating exercises that focus on pelvic muscle strength, they can help reduce pain and stress urinary incontinence.

Engaging in regular exercise and physical activity has been shown to be beneficial during pregnancy. Acute bouts of high intensity interval training can help decrease the risks of health complications associated with pregnancy, maintain a healthy body fat percentage during pregnancy, as well as improve overall well-being. Pregnant women who participated in high intensity interval training have been shown to undergo physical improvements in body composition after intervention as well as show general improvement in cardiorespiratory fitness and exercise tolerance. Taking part in this style of exercise, similarly to moderate intensity continuous training, has also been shown to improve glycemic response and insulin sensitivity. There are specific concerns to be avoided with exercise during pregnancy such as overheating, fall-risk, and remaining in a supine position for an extended period of time. Inexperienced individuals new to high-intensity interval training could potentially increase their risk for negative conditions associated with hypertension, such as pre-eclampsia.

=== Sleep ===
It has been suggested that shift work and exposure to bright light at night should be avoided at least during the last trimester of pregnancy to decrease the risk of psychological and behavioral problems in the newborn.

=== Stress ===
Heightened maternal stress during pregnancy has been consistently associated with alterations in fetal and infant brain development and an increased risk for later mental health problems ("psychopathology"). Prenatal adversity (for example elevated maternal stress and depressive and anxiety symptoms during pregnancy) has been consistently associated with an increased risk for psychopathology in children. Maternal stress during pregnancy is therefore thought to influence fetal brain development and thereby contribute to increased vulnerability to later psychopathology.

Research demonstrates that prenatal stress can fundamentally alter the brain's physical architecture (smaller overall volume, altered cortical thinning, functional connectivity, ...), leading to reduced volume and weakened connectivity in areas critical for emotion processing and regulation, as well as learning and memory. In contrast, also caregiving-focused interventions and higher natural caregiving quality have been associated with a positive impact on the brain structure. Animal studies further show that enhanced maternal care or enriched environments can reverse the effects of prenatal adversity at the cellular level, supporting the biological plausibility of similar processes in humans. Children of women who experienced high stress levels during pregnancy are slightly more likely to show externalizing behavioral problems, such as impulsivity. These behavioral effects appear to be most pronounced during early childhood.

Importantly, prenatal stress does not inevitably cause mental health problems. Not all children who are exposed to prenatal adversity develop psychiatric disorders. Evidence from both human and animal studies suggests that high-quality caregiving, cognitive and language stimulation, social support, and higher socioeconomic status can act as protective or supportive factors. Improving outcomes for children exposed to prenatal stress mainly involves strengthening the early postnatal environment rather than attempting to eliminate all stress during pregnancy. Supportive environments in early postnatal life may promote brain development and help normalize developmental trajectories that were altered by prenatal stress, highlighting caregiving quality, cognitive and language input, social support, and socioeconomic stability as key factors. High-quality caregiving is consistently identified as especially important, with studies showing that associations between prenatal stress and adverse outcomes are not observed when maternal sensitivity is high, and that sensitive caregiving can reduce the impact of prenatal stress on neurocognitive and neuroendocrine pathways linked to later psychopathology. Beyond the parent–child relationship, broader support systems also matter: higher levels of social support and socioeconomic resources are associated with more adaptive development and can, in some contexts, reduce the negative effects of preterm birth or low birth weight on neurocognitive outcomes. Overall, promoting warm, responsive caregiving and ensuring families have adequate social and material support during the early years can meaningfully improve children's developmental trajectories, even when prenatal stress has occurred.

Extreme stress caused by events such as natural disasters, genocide, slavery, forced family separation, or long-term exposure to war is thought to create widespread trauma that changes how people function physically, psychologically, and socially, and these changes may be passed on across generations. Research suggests that recognizing severe maternal stress early, during or after such events, and providing structured psychological support such as psychological first aid or cognitive behavioural therapy can lower long-term risks for child development. When stress exposure is particularly high, ongoing monitoring, early developmental support, and sensitive, responsive caregiving are especially important to prevent lasting negative effects.

=== Dental care ===
The increased levels of progesterone and estrogen during pregnancy make gingivitis more likely; the gums become edematous, red in colour, and tend to bleed. Also a pyogenic granuloma or "pregnancy tumor", is commonly seen on the labial surface of the papilla. Lesions can be treated by local debridement or deep incision depending on their size, and by following adequate oral hygiene measures. There have been suggestions that severe periodontitis may increase the risk of having preterm birth and low birth weight; however, a Cochrane review found insufficient evidence to determine if periodontitis can develop adverse birth outcomes.

=== Flying ===
In low risk pregnancies, most health care providers approve flying until about 36 weeks of gestational age. Most airlines allow pregnant women to fly short distances at less than 36 weeks, and long distances at less than 32 weeks. Many airlines require a doctor's note that approves flying, especially at over 28 weeks. During flights, the risk of deep vein thrombosis is decreased by getting up and walking occasionally, as well as by avoiding dehydration. The exposure to cosmic radiation is negligible for most travelers. For pregnant women, even the longest intercontinental flight would expose them less than 15% of both the NCRPM and ICRP limit. Full body scanners use non-ionizing radiation that does not penetrate the body for more than 1 mm, and are believed not to pose a risk in pregnancy.

=== Pregnancy classes and birth plan ===
To prepare for the birth of the baby, health care providers recommend that parents attend antenatal classes during the third trimester of pregnancy. Classes include information about the process of labour and birth and the various kinds of births, including both vaginal and caesarean delivery, the use of forceps, and other interventions that may be needed to safely deliver the infant. Types of pain relief, including relaxation techniques, are discussed. Partners or others who may plan to support a woman during her labour and delivery learn how to assist in the birth.

It is also suggested that a birth plan be written at this time. A birth plan is a written statement that outlines the desires of the mother during labour and delivery of the baby. Discussing the birth plan with the midwife or other care provider gives parents a chance to ask questions and learn more about the process of labour.

In 1991 the WHO launched the Baby-Friendly Hospital Initiative, a global program that recognizes birthing centers and hospitals that offer optimal levels of care for giving birth. Facilities that have been certified as "Baby Friendly" accept visits from expecting parents to familiarize them with the facility and the staff.

== Complications and diseases ==
Each year, ill health as a result of pregnancy is experienced (sometimes permanently) by more than 20 million women around the world. In 2016, complications of pregnancy resulted in 230,600 deaths down from 377,000 deaths in 1990. Common causes include bleeding (72,000), infections (20,000), hypertensive diseases of pregnancy (32,000), obstructed labour (10,000), and pregnancy with abortive outcome (20,000), which includes miscarriage, abortion, and ectopic pregnancy.

The following are some examples of pregnancy complications:

- Pregnancy induced hypertension
- Anemia
- Perinatal depression
- Postpartum depression, a common but solvable complication following childbirth that may result from decreased hormonal levels.
- Postpartum psychosis
- Thromboembolic disorders, with an increased risk due to hypercoagulability in pregnancy. These are the leading cause of death in pregnant women in the US.
- Pruritic urticarial papules and plaques of pregnancy (PUPPP), a skin disease that develops around the 32nd week. Signs are red plaques, papules, and itchiness around the belly button that then spreads all over the body except for the inside of hands and face.
- Ectopic pregnancy, including abdominal pregnancy, implantation of the embryo outside the uterus
- Hyperemesis gravidarum, excessive nausea and vomiting that is more severe than normal morning sickness.
- Pulmonary embolism, a blood clot that forms in the legs and migrates to the lungs.
- Acute fatty liver of pregnancy is a rare complication thought to be brought about by a disruption in the metabolism of fatty acids by mitochondria.

There is also an increased susceptibility and severity of certain infections in pregnancy.

=== Miscarriage and stillbirth ===
Miscarriage is the most common complication of early pregnancy. It is defined as the loss of an embryo or fetus before it is able to survive independently. The most common symptom of miscarriage is vaginal bleeding with or without pain. The miscarriage may be evidenced by a clot-like material passing through and out of the vagina. About 80% of miscarriages occur in the first 12 weeks of pregnancy. The underlying cause in about half of cases involves chromosomal abnormalities.

Stillbirth is defined as fetal death after 20 or 28 weeks of pregnancy, depending on the source. It results in a baby born without signs of life. Each year about 21,000 babies are stillborn in the U.S. Sadness, anxiety, and guilt may occur after a miscarriage or a stillbirth. Emotional support may help with processing the loss. Fathers may experience grief over the loss as well. A large study found that there is a need to increase the accessibility of support services available for fathers.

=== Diseases in pregnancy ===
A pregnant woman may have a pre-existing disease, which is not directly caused by the pregnancy, but may cause complications to develop that include a potential risk to the pregnancy; or a disease may develop during pregnancy.

- Diabetes mellitus and pregnancy deals with the interactions of diabetes mellitus (not restricted to gestational diabetes) and pregnancy. Risks for the child include miscarriage, growth restriction, growth acceleration, large for gestational age (macrosomia), polyhydramnios (too much amniotic fluid), and birth defects.
- Thyroid disease in pregnancy can, if uncorrected, cause adverse effects on fetal and maternal well-being. The deleterious effects of thyroid dysfunction can also extend beyond pregnancy and delivery to affect neurointellectual development in the early life of the child. Demand for thyroid hormones is increased during pregnancy, which may cause a previously unnoticed thyroid disorder to worsen.
- Untreated celiac disease can cause a miscarriage, intrauterine growth restriction, small for gestational age, low birthweight and preterm birth. Often reproductive disorders are the only manifestation of undiagnosed celiac disease and most cases are not recognized. Complications or failures of pregnancy cannot be explained simply by malabsorption, but by the autoimmune response elicited by the exposure to gluten, which causes damage to the placenta. A gluten-free diet avoids or reduces the risk of developing reproductive disorders in pregnant women with celiac disease. Also, pregnancy can be a trigger for the development of celiac disease in genetically susceptible women who are consuming gluten.
- Lupus in pregnancy confers an increased rate of fetal death in utero, miscarriage, and of neonatal lupus.
- Hypercoagulability in pregnancy is the propensity of pregnant women to develop thrombosis (blood clots). Pregnancy itself is a factor of hypercoagulability (pregnancy-induced hypercoagulability), as a physiologically adaptive mechanism to prevent postpartum bleeding. However, in combination with an underlying hypercoagulable state, the risk of thrombosis or embolism may become substantial.

== Birth control and abortion ==
=== Birth control and education ===
Family planning, as well as the availability and use of contraception, along with increased comprehensive sex education, has enabled many to prevent pregnancies when they are not desired. Schemes and funding to support education and the means to prevent pregnancies when they are not intended have been instrumental and are part of the third of the Sustainable Development Goals (SDGs) advanced by the United Nations.

=== Abortion ===
An abortion is the termination of an embryo or fetus via medical method. It is usually done within the first trimester, sometimes in the second, and rarely in the third. Reasons for pregnancies being undesired are broad. Many jurisdictions restrict or prohibit abortion, with rape being the most legally permissible exception.

=== Assisted reproductive technology ===
Modern reproductive medicine offers many forms of assisted reproductive technology for couples who stay childless against their will, such as fertility medication, artificial insemination, in vitro fertilization and surrogacy.

== Society and culture ==
=== Legal protections ===
Many countries have various legal regulations in place to protect pregnant women and their children. Many countries have laws against pregnancy discrimination.

The Maternity Protection Convention ensures that pregnant women are exempt from activities such as night shifts or carrying heavy stocks. Maternity leave typically provides paid leave from work during roughly the last trimester of pregnancy and for some time after birth. Notable extreme cases include Norway (8 months with full pay) and the United States (no paid leave at all except in some states).

In the United States, some actions that result in miscarriage or stillbirth, such as beating a pregnant woman, are considered crimes. One law that does so is the federal Unborn Victims of Violence Act. In 2014, the American state of Tennessee passed a law which allows prosecutors to charge a woman with criminal assault if she uses illegal drugs during her pregnancy and her fetus or newborn is harmed as a result.

However, protections are not universal. In Singapore, the Employment of Foreign Manpower Act forbids current and former work permit holders from becoming pregnant or giving birth in Singapore without prior permission. Violation of the Act is punishable by a fine of up to S$10,000 (US$7300) and deportation, and until 2010, their employers would lose their $5,000 security bond.

=== Racial disparities ===
There are significant racial imbalances in pregnancy and neonatal care systems. Midwifery guidance, treatment, and care have been related to better birth outcomes. Diminishing racial inequities in health is an increasingly large public health challenge in the United States. Despite the fact that average rates have decreased, data on neonatal mortality demonstrates that racial disparities have persisted and grown. The death rate for African American babies is nearly double that of white neonates. According to studies, congenital defects, SIDS, preterm birth, and low birth weight are all more common among African American babies.

=== Transgender people ===
Transgender people have experienced significant advances in societal acceptance in recent years leaving many health professionals unprepared to provide quality care. A 2015 report suggests that "numbers of transgender individuals who are seeking family planning, fertility, and pregnancy services could certainly be quite large". Regardless of prior hormone replacement therapy treatments, the progression of pregnancy and birthing procedures for transgender people who carry pregnancies are typically the same as those of cisgender women. However, transgender people may be subjected to discrimination, which can include a variety of negative social, emotional, and medical experiences, as pregnancy is regarded as an exclusively female activity. According to a study by the American College of Obstetricians and Gynecologists, there is a lack of awareness, services, and medical assistance available to pregnant trans men.

=== Culture ===
In most cultures, pregnant women have a special status in society and receive particularly gentle care. At the same time, they are subject to expectations that may exert great psychological pressure, such as having to produce a son and heir. In many traditional societies, pregnancy must be preceded by marriage, on pain of ostracism of the mother and resulting (illegitimate) child.

Overall, pregnancy is accompanied by numerous customs that are often subject to ethnological research, often rooted in traditional medicine or religion. The baby shower is an example of a modern custom. Contrary to common misconception, women historically in the United States were not expected to seclude themselves during pregnancy, as was popularized by Gone With the Wind.

Pregnancy is an important topic in sociology of the family. The prospective child may preliminarily be placed into numerous social roles. The parents' relationship and the relation between parents and their surroundings are also affected.

A belly cast may be made during pregnancy as a keepsake.

==== Arts ====
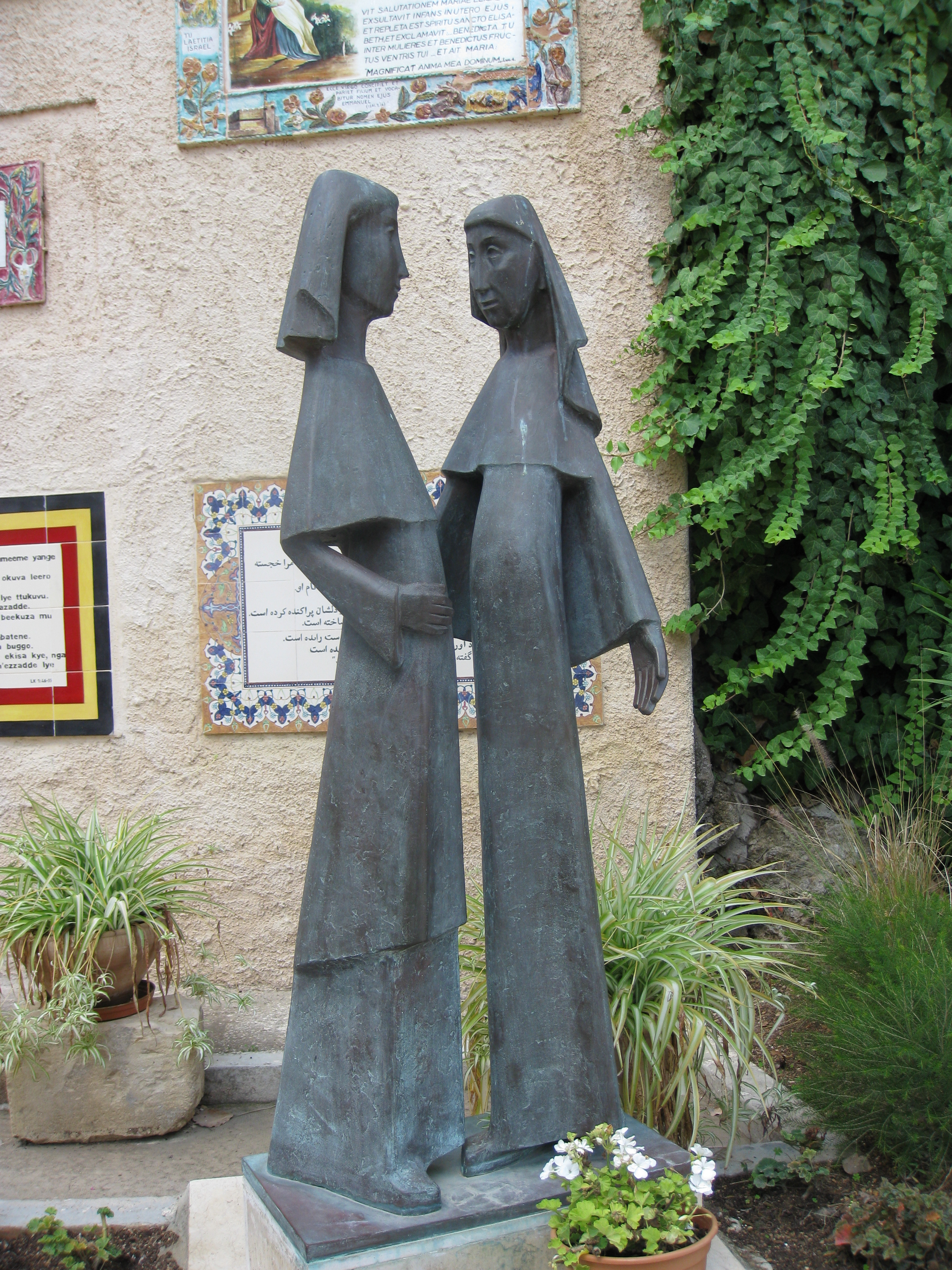
The Visitation: Mary, pregnant with Jesus, visiting pregnant Elizabeth, depicted as a statue at the Church of the Visitation in Ein Karem, Israel

Images of pregnant women, especially small figurines, were made in traditional cultures in many places and periods, though it is rarely one of the most common types of image. These include ceramic figures from some Pre-Columbian cultures, and a few figures from most of the ancient Mediterranean cultures. Many of these seem to be connected with fertility. Identifying whether such figures are actually meant to show pregnancy is often a problem, as well as understanding their role in the culture concerned.

Among the oldest surviving examples of the depiction of pregnancy are prehistoric figurines found across much of Eurasia and collectively known as Venus figurines. Some of these appear to be pregnant.

Due to the important role of the Mother of God in Christianity, the Western visual arts have a long tradition of depictions of pregnancy, especially in the biblical scene of the Visitation, and devotional images called a Madonna del Parto.

The unhappy scene usually called Diana and Callisto, showing the moment of discovery of Callisto's forbidden pregnancy, is sometimes painted from the Renaissance onwards. Gradually, portraits of pregnant women began to appear, with a particular fashion for "pregnancy portraits" in elite portraiture of the years around 1600.

Pregnancy, and especially pregnancy of unmarried women, is also an important motif in literature. Notable examples include Thomas Hardy's 1891 novel Tess of the d'Urbervilles and Goethe's 1808 play Faust.

== See also ==
- Couvade syndrome
- Cryptic pregnancy
- False pregnancy
- Simulated pregnancy
- Pregnancy-related anxiety
- Superfecundation
