= Jodi Pawluski =

Neuroscientist, psychotherapist and researcher

- Born: Vernon, British Columbia
- Occupation: Neuroscientist

Academic background
- Education: University of British Columbia; University of Toronto
- Thesis: The role of reproductive experience on hippocampus-dependent spatial memory, adult hippocampal neurogenesis, and corticosterone in the rat dam (2007)
- Doctoral advisor: Liisa Galea

Academic work
- Institutions: University of Rennes
- Main interests: Maternal brain
- Website: Official website

Jodi Lynn Pawluski is a Canadian neuroscientist, psychotherapist, and researcher affiliated with the University of Rennes in France. She is recognized for her research on the maternal brain. In 2022, she published Mommy Brain, first in French and subsequently in English, examining the neuroscience of motherhood. She also serves on the editorial board of Archives of Women's Mental Health, the official journal of the International Marcé Society.

== Early life and education ==
Jodi Pawluski is originally from British Columbia, Canada. She graduated from Seaton High School in 1995. She earned a bachelor's degree in biopsychology from the University of British Columbia, followed by a master's degree in psychology from the University of Toronto in 2003. She completed her PhD in neuroscience at the University of British Columbia in 2007. At the university, she worked in the laboratory of Liisa Galea. In 2019, she obtained a habilitation degree in life sciences at the University of Rennes in France.

== Career ==
Pawluski's research focuses on understanding the maternal brain. In 2020, she started a podcast called Mommy Brain Revisited, which focuses on bringing current research on the parental brain to the general public. Since 2020 she has been counselling mothers.

In her 2023 paper in JAMA Neurology, titled "It's Time to Rebrand "Mommy Brain", Pawluski emphasizes the importance of educating mothers about real brain changes that occur in early motherhood, and highlights the need to challenge the myth that memory changes during pregnancy are inherently negative or signs of dysfunction. While pregnant women in her studies often reported memory issues, objective testing revealed improved performance on tasks related to their babies. In addition, her research found that pregnant women exhibited enhanced long-term memory. She explains the idea of the "mommy brain" as a societal construct, noting that because mothers are expected to be perfect, even minor lapses are more likely to be noticed and attributed to cognitive decline.

In 2022, Pawluski authored Mommy Brain: Découvrez les fabuleux pouvoirs du cerveau des mères ! published in French by Editions Larousse, and the following year it was translated into English.

== Other roles ==
Pawluski is on the editorial board of the International Marcé Society's official journal Archives of Women's Mental Health.

== Selected publications ==
=== Selected Articles ===
Full article list found at https://pubmed.ncbi.nlm.nih.gov/?term=pawluski&sort=date

- Callaghan, Bridget; McCormack, Clare; Kim, Pilyoung; Pawluski, Jodi (2024). "Understanding the maternal brain in the context of the mental load of motherhood". Nature Mental Health. 2 (7): 764–772. doi:10.1038/s44220-024-00268-4. (lead-author)
- Pawluski, Jodi (2024). "The parental brain, perinatal mental illness, and treatment: A review of key structural and functional changes". Semin. Perinatol. 48 (6) 151951. doi:10.1016/j.semperi.2024.151951. PMID 39030131.
- Pawluski, Jodi L.; Lonstein, Joseph S.; Fleming, Alison S. (1 February 2017). "The Neurobiology of Postpartum Anxiety and Depression". Trends in Neurosciences. 40 (2): 106–120. doi:10.1016/j.tins.2016.11.009. ISSN 0166-2236. PMID 28129895. (Co-author)
- McCormack, Clare; Callaghan, Bridget L.; Pawluski, Jodi L. (1 April 2023). "It's Time to Rebrand "Mommy Brain"". JAMA Neurology. 80 (4): 335–336. doi:10.1001/jamaneurol.2022.5180. ISSN 2168-6157. PMID 36745418. (Lead-author)
- Rayen, Ine; Van Den Hove, Daniël L.; Prickaerts, Jos; Steinbusch, Harry W.; Pawluski, Jodi L. (1 September 2011). "Fluoxetine during Development Reverses the Effects of Prenatal Stress on Depressive-Like Behavior and Hippocampal Neurogenesis in Adolescence". PLOS ONE. 6 (9) e24003. Bibcode:2011PLoSO...624003R. doi:10.1371/journal.pone.0024003. ISSN 1932-6203. PMC 3164681. PMID 21912658. (Lead-author)
- Galea, Liisa A.M.; Spritzer, Mark D.; Barker, Jennifer M.; Pawluski, Jodi L. (2006). "Gonadal hormone modulation of hippocampal neurogenesis in the adult". Hippocampus. 16 (3): 225–232. doi:10.1002/hipo.20154. ISSN 1098-1063. PMID 16411182. (Co-author)
- Brummelte, Susanne; Pawluski, Jodi L.; Galea, Liisa A.M. (1 September 2006). "High post-partum levels of corticosterone given to dams influence postnatal hippocampal cell proliferation and behavior of offspring: A model of post-partum stress and possible depression". Hormones and Behavior. 50 (3): 370–382. doi:10.1016/j.yhbeh.2006.04.008. ISSN 0018-506X. PMID 16780843. (Co-author)
- Pawluski, J.L.; Galea, L.A.M. (12 October 2007). "Reproductive experience alters hippocampal neurogenesis during the postpartum period in the dam". Neuroscience. 149 (1): 53–67. doi:10.1016/j.neuroscience.2007.07.031. ISSN 0306-4522. PMID 17869008. (Co-author)

=== Books ===
- Mommy Brain (in French). Larousse. 2022. ISBN 978-2-03-598959-8.
