= Catherine Dulac =

French–American biologist

Catherine Gisèle Dulac
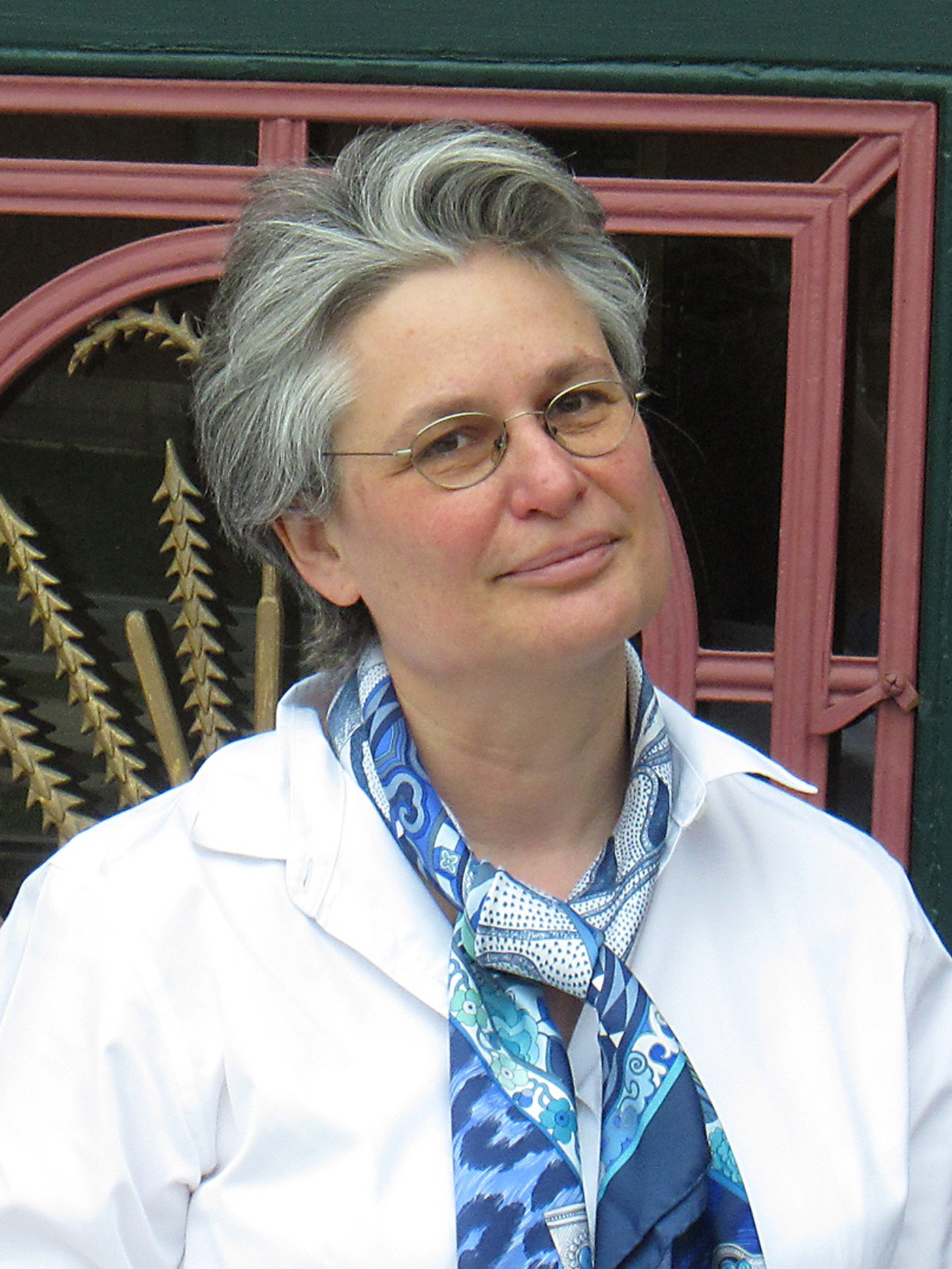
- Born: February 11, 1963 (age 63); France
- Education: École Normale Supérieure (BSc); Institut d'Embryologie cellulaire et moléculaire (Institute of Cellular and Molecular Embryology) (PhD); Pierre and Marie Curie University (PhD)
- Known for: Mammalian pheromones Parental brain regulation Research in neuroscience of sex differences Genomic imprinting
- Awards: Richard Lounsbery Award; Breakthrough Prize in Life Sciences
- Scientific career
- Fields: Molecular biology Neuroscience
- Workplaces: Columbia University; Harvard University; Howard Hughes Medical Institute
- Thesis: Etude de la differenciation des cellules gliales dans le systeme nerveux peripherique (Molecular and cellular study of glial cell differentiation in the peripheral nervous system) (1991)
- Doctoral advisor: Nicole Marthe Le Douarin
- Other academic advisors: Richard Axel

Catherine Dulac is a French–American molecular biologist and neuroscientist. She is a professor at the Department of Molecular and Cellular Biology of Harvard University and, since 2022, has been the current Samuel W. Morris University Professor. Prior to her appointment as University Professor, she was the Higgins Professor of Molecular and Cellular Biology (from 2006) and the Lee and Ezpeleta Professor of Arts and Sciences (from 2018) in the Faculty of Arts and Sciences at Harvard University.

== Early life and education ==
Dulac grew up in Montpellier, France. Her parents were academics and researchers in the humanities. She entered the École Normale Supérieure in 1982, graduating with a BSc 4 years later.

She then conducted her PhD research under Nicole Marthe Le Douarin at the Institut d'Embryologie cellulaire et moléculaire (Institute of Cellular and Molecular Embryology) in Nogent-sur-Marne, which was affiliated to both Collège de France and the French National Centre for Scientific Research, and defended her PhD thesis at the Pierre and Marie Curie University in Paris in 1991. She stayed at the Institut d'Embryologie cellulaire et moléculaire until 1992.

== Career ==
After her PhD, in 1993, Dulac went to Columbia University as a postdoctoral fellow in Richard Axel's group. One of the reasons for moving to the United States despite not speaking English was her desire to work on mice, which was a model organism, unlike chicken embryos that she had been working on.

In 1996, Dulac joined the Department of Molecular and Cellular Biology of Harvard University as an assistant professor, She was promoted to associate professor in 2000 and then full professor in 2001. She was the department chair between 2007 and 2013.

Dulac was appointed Higgins Professor of Molecular and Cellular Biology in 2006 and then Lee and Ezpeleta Professor of Arts and Sciences, a five-year position, in 2018. In 2022, she was conferred the highest honor for a Harvard academic staff, having been named one of the University Professors, the Samuel W. Morris University Professor. She is also currently a member of the Harvard Brain Science Initiative, as well as the Center for Brain Science and the affiliated Hock E. Tan and K. Lisa Yang Center for Autism Research at Harvard.

Dulac has been an investigator at the Howard Hughes Medical Institute since 1997.

== Research ==
Dulac's research spans from olfactory signalling in mammals through pheromones to the neuroscience of sex differences and parental behaviors.

In 1995, working on mice, Dulac became the first to identify genes in mammals that encodes receptors for pheromones. These receptors are termed vomeronasal receptors for their presence in a special structure of the nose called the vomeronasal organ (VNO). She continued researching the signalling pathway of pheromone in mice, discovering that Trpc2, an ion channel only found in the VNO in mice, played a major role in passing pheromone signals to downstream players in the pheromone signalling pathway.

Her group later confirmed the central role Trpc2 plays in mice, showing male mice lacking Trpc2 could not distinguish male mice from female mice, and that female mice lacking Trpc2 sexually behaved more like males. In humans, however, this gene is a pseudogene and is non-functional, which partly explains why humans have a less functional pheromone signalling system.

Apart from pheromones, Dulac has also studied the regulation of the parental brain, reporting that a group of neurons which express galanin regulates parental responses in mice.

More recently, Dulac began studying a region of the amygdala (known as medial amygdala) and its role in regulating sex-specific behaviors, and entered the field of epigenetics, for example profiling genomic imprinting in mice.

== Awards and honors ==
- Searle Scholar (1998)
- Member of the American Academy of Arts and Sciences (2004)
- Richard Lounsbery Award (2006)
- Member of the French Academy of Sciences (2007)
- Perl-UNC Neuroscience Prize (2010)
- Knight of National Order of the Legion of Honour (2011)
- Member of the National Academy of Sciences (2015)
- Edward M. Scolnick Prize in Neuroscience, McGovern Institute for Brain Research (2015)
- Karl Spencer Lashley Award (2018)
- Member of the American Philosophical Society (2019)
- Ralph W. Gerard Prize in Neuroscience (2019)
- Breakthrough Prize in Life Sciences (2021)
- Officer of the National Order of the Legion of Honour (2022)
