= Physiological changes in pregnancy =

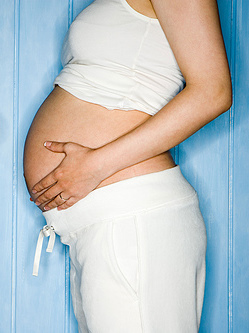
Pelvis and back body posture during pregnancy

Physiological changes in pregnancy are the adaptations that take place during pregnancy that enable the accommodation of the developing embryo and fetus. These are normal physiological adaptations that cause changes in behavior, the heart, blood vessels, and blood metabolism, including increases in blood sugar levels, kidney function, posture, and breathing. During pregnancy numerous hormones and proteins are secreted that also have a broad range of effects.

== Hormonal ==
Pregnant women experience numerous adjustments in their endocrine system that help support the developing fetus. The fetal-placental unit secretes steroid hormones and proteins that alter the function of various maternal endocrine glands. Sometimes the changes in certain hormone levels and their effects on their target organs can lead to gestational diabetes and gestational hypertension.

Hormone levels during pregnancy in human females
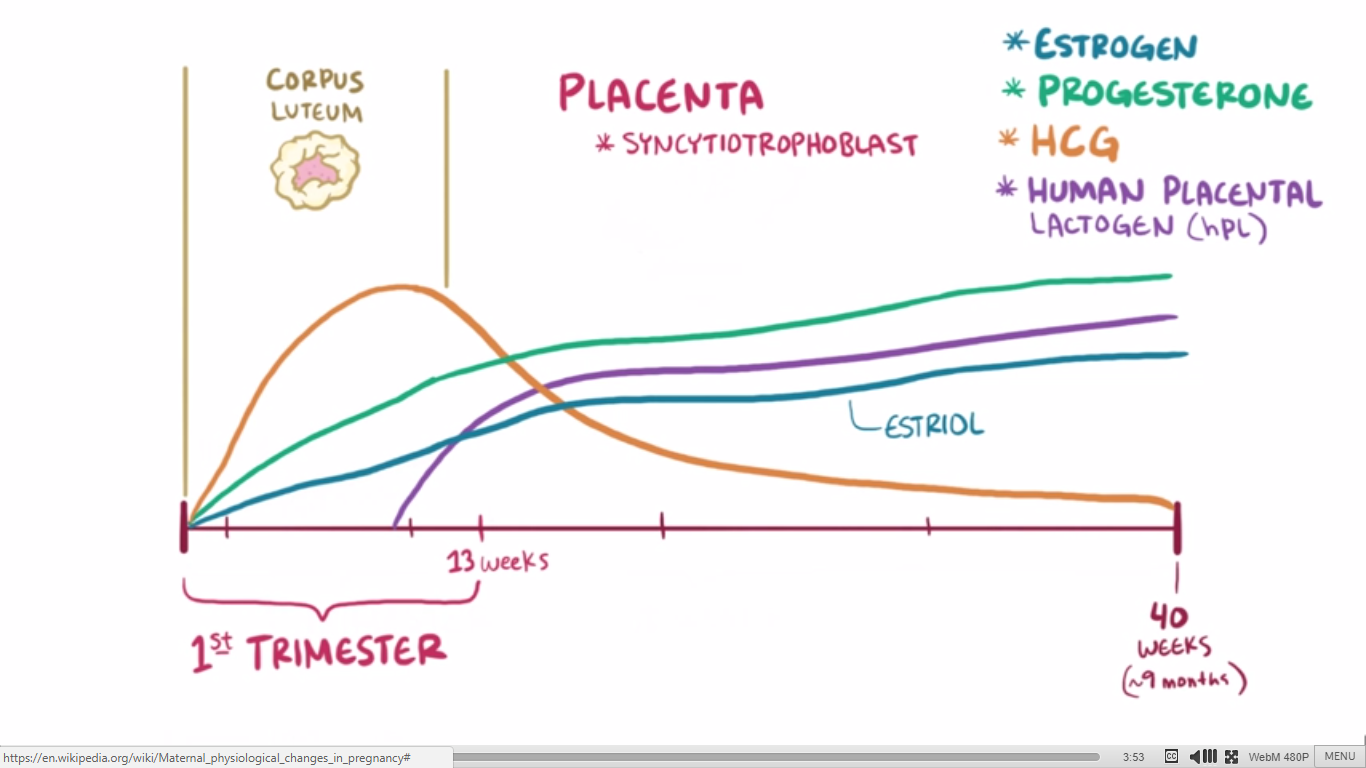
Estrogen, progesterone, and human chorionic gonadotropin (hCG) levels throughout pregnancy.

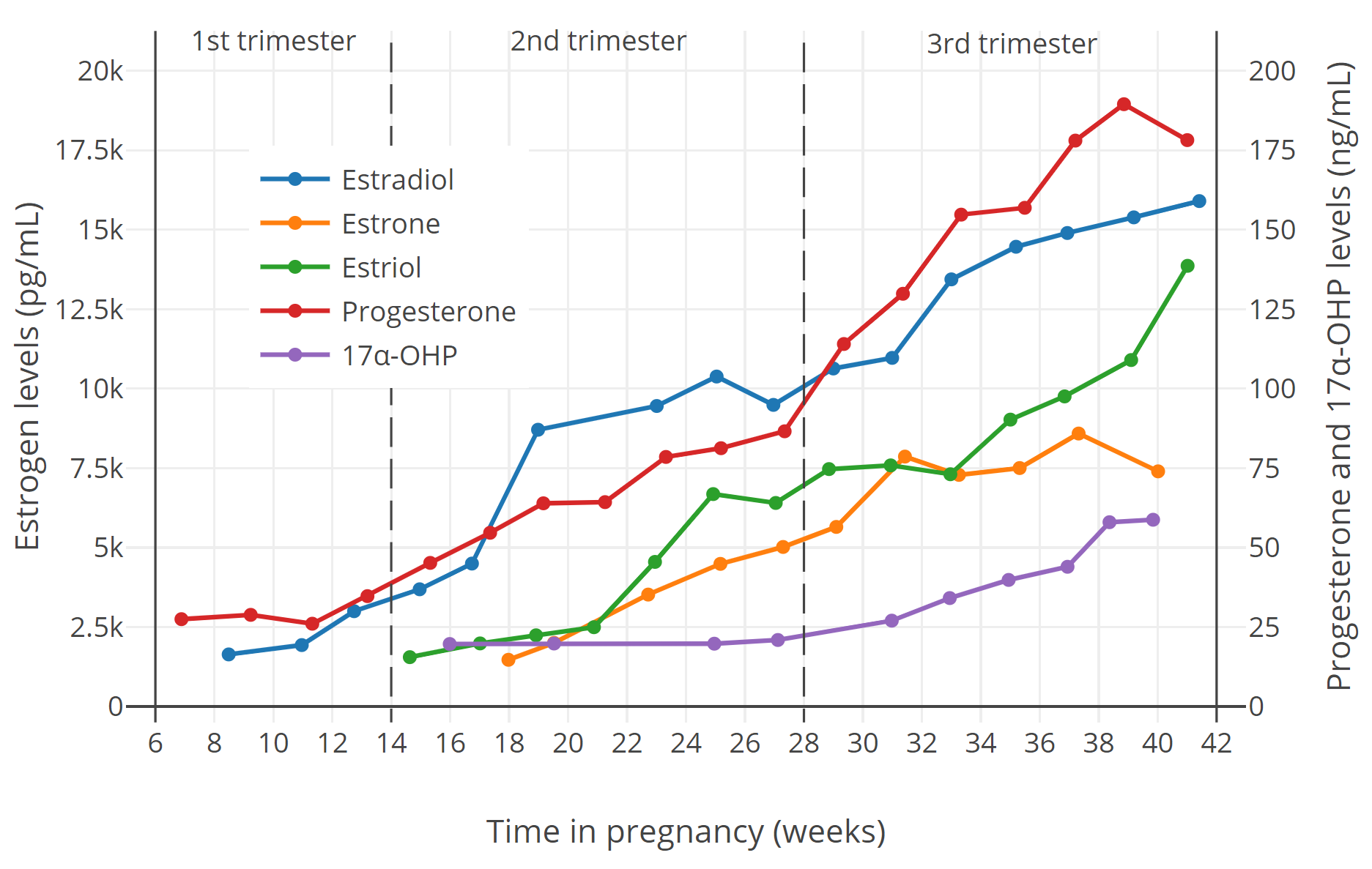
Estrogen, progesterone, and 17α-hydroxyprogesterone (17α-OHP) levels during pregnancy in women. The dashed vertical lines separate the trimesters. Determinations were via radioimmunoassay.

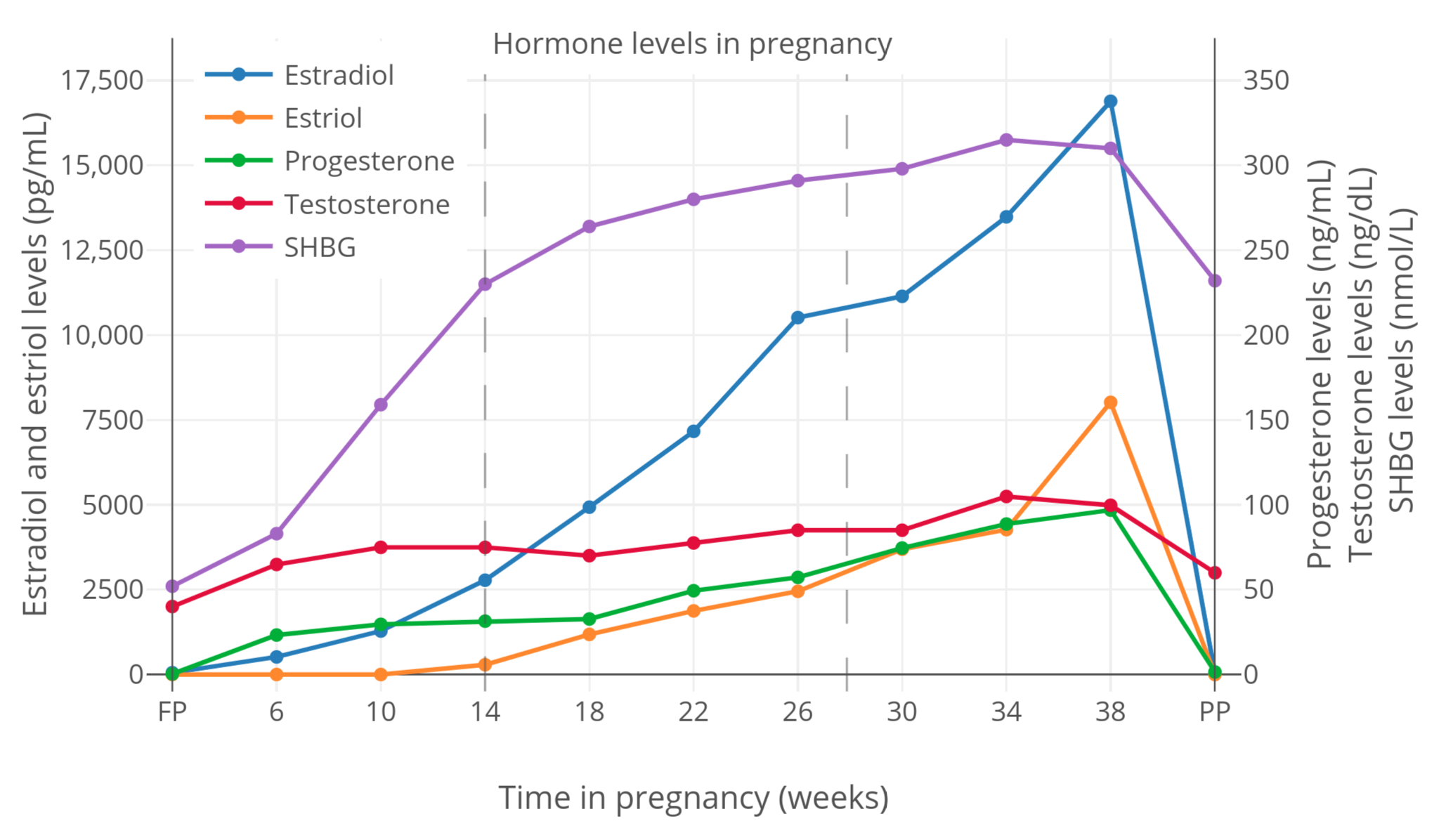
Levels of sex hormones and SHBG during pregnancy in women. The dashed vertical lines separate the trimesters. Determinations were via radioimmunoassay.

=== Fetal-placental unit ===
Levels of progesterone and estrogen rise continually throughout pregnancy, suppressing the hypothalamic axis and the menstrual cycle. The progesterone is first produced by the corpus luteum and then by the placenta in the second trimester. Women also experience increased human chorionic gonadotropin (β-hCG), which is produced by the placenta.

=== Pancreatic insulin ===
The placenta also produces human placental lactogen (hPL), which stimulates maternal lipolysis and fatty acid metabolism. This conserves blood glucose for use by the fetus. It can also decrease maternal tissue sensitivity to insulin, resulting in gestational diabetes.

=== Pituitary gland ===
The pituitary gland grows by about one-third as a result of hyperplasia of the lactrotrophs in response to the high plasma estrogen. Prolactin, which is produced by the lactrotrophs increases progressively throughout pregnancy. Prolactin mediates a change in the structure of the breast mammary glands from ductal to lobular-alveolar and stimulates milk production.

=== Parathyroid ===
Fetal skeletal formation and then later lactation challenges the maternal body to maintain their calcium levels. The World Health Organization recommends that women consume 1200 mg of calcium daily during pregnancy. The fetal skeleton requires approximately 30 grams of calcium by the end of pregnancy. The mother's body adapts by increasing parathyroid hormone, leading to an increase in calcium uptake within the gut as well as increased calcium reabsorption by the kidneys. Maternal total serum calcium decreases due to maternal hypoalbuminemia, but the ionized calcium levels are maintained. If there is insufficient calcium intake, the mineral may be taken from the pregnant woman's bones, particularly in the later stages of pregnancy.

=== Adrenal glands ===
Total cortisol increases to three times of non-pregnant levels by the third trimester. The increased estrogen in pregnancy leads to increased corticosteroid-binding globulin production, and in response, the adrenal gland produces more cortisol. The net effect is an increase of free cortisol. This contributes to insulin resistance of pregnancy and possibly striae. The adrenal gland also produces more aldosterone, leading to an eight-fold increase in aldosterone.

The adrenal gland also produces more androgens, such as testosterone, but this is buffered by estrogen's increase in sex-hormone binding globulin (SHBG). SHBG binds avidly to testosterone and to a lesser degree DHEA.

=== Thyroid ===
The thyroid enlarges and may be more easily felt during the first trimester. The increase in kidney clearance during pregnancy causes more iodide to be excreted and causes relative iodine deficiency and as a result an increase in thyroid size. Estrogen-stimulated increase in thyroid-binding globulin (TBG) leads to an increase in total thyroxine (T4), but free thyroxine (T4) and triiodothyronine (T3) remain normal.

=== Endocrine function tests in pregnancy ===
Effect of pregnancy on endocrine function tests.
Hormone	Test	Result
FSH, LH	GnRH stimulation	Unresponsive from third gestation until several weeks postpartum
Growth Hormone	Insulin tolerance test	Response increases during first half of pregnancy and then normalizes until several weeks postpartum
TSH	TRH stimulation	Response unchanged
Pancreatic Insulin	Glucose tolerance test	Peak glucose increases, and glucose concentration remains elevated for longer
Adrenal Cortisol	ACTH infusion	Exaggerated cortisol and aldosterone responses
	Metyrapone	Diminished response
Mineralocorticoids	ACTH infusion	No deoxycorticosterone response
	Dexamethasone	No deoxycorticosterone response

== Breast changes ==
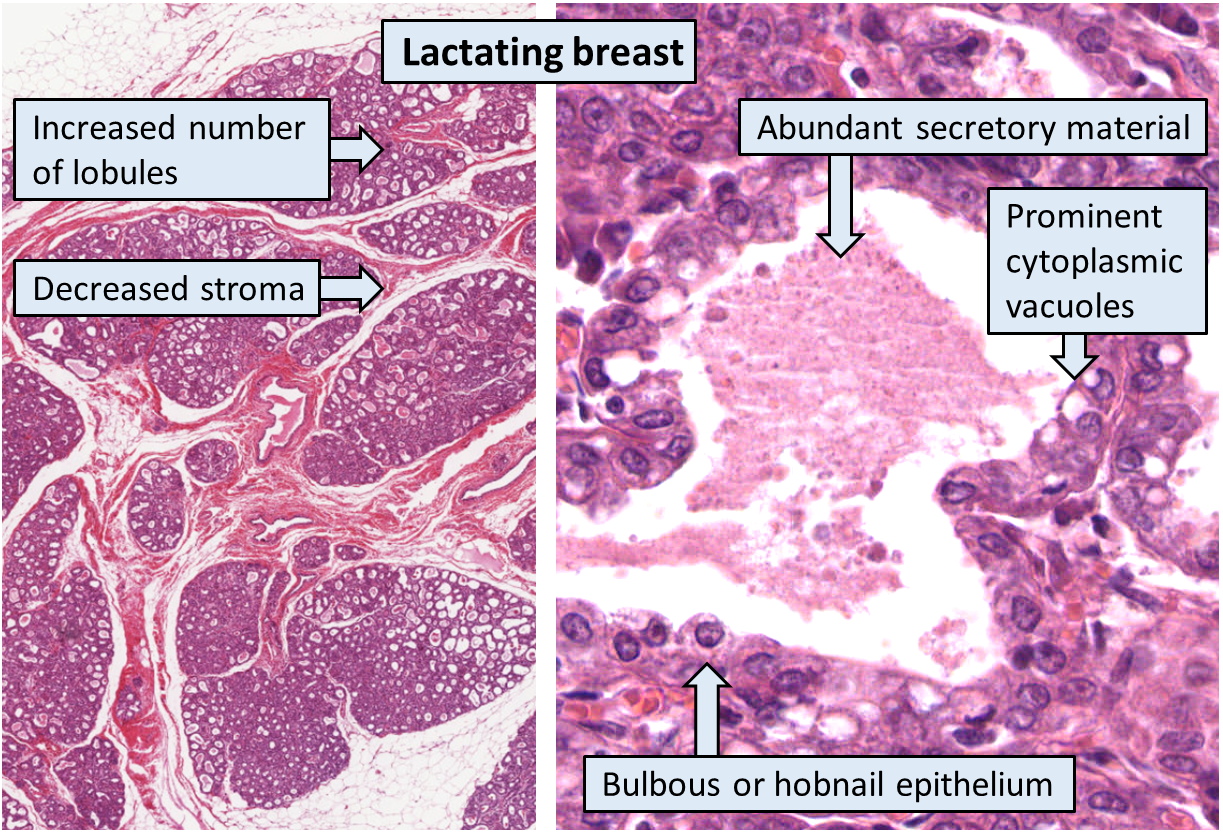
Normal histology of the breast during lactation.

A woman's breasts change during pregnancy to prepare them for breastfeeding a baby. Normal changes include:

- Tenderness of the nipple or breast
- An increase in breast size over the course of the pregnancy
- Changes in the color or size of the nipples and areola
- More pronounced appearance of Montgomery's tubercles (bumps on the areola)

From about the 16th week of pregnancy the breasts are able to begin to produce milk. It's not unusual for small amounts of straw-coloured fluid called colostrum to leak from the nipples. Breast lumps also sometimes develop during pregnancy but these are generally benign cysts or fibroadenoma which are not cause for concern. If the nipples begin to leak any blood tinged fluid a woman should consult her doctor.

Breast development throughout pregnancy may result in significant Areola and Areolar gland enlargement, erectile nipples, and/or nipple sensitivity.

A woman's breasts typically grow one to two cup sizes. A woman who wore a C cup bra prior to her pregnancy may need to buy an F cup or larger bra while nursing. A woman's torso also grows and her bra band size may increase one or two sizes. An average of 80% of women wear the wrong bra size, and mothers who are preparing to nurse can benefit from a professional bra fitting from a lactation consultant. Once the baby is born, after the initial stage of breastfeeding with colostrum, the mother will experience her breasts filling with milk (sometimes referred to as "the milk coming in"). This can happen 50–73 hours after birth. Once full lactation begins, the woman's breasts swell significantly and can feel achy, lumpy and heavy (which is referred to as engorgement). Her breasts may increase in size again by an additional one or two cup sizes, but individual breast size may vary depending on how much the infant nurses from each breast. Changes in breast size during pregnancy may be related to the sex of the infant, as mothers of female infants have greater changes in breast size than mothers of male infants.

Many people, and even medical professionals, mistakenly think that breastfeeding causes the breasts to sag (referred to as ptosis). As a result, some new parents are reluctant to nurse their infants. In February 2009, Cheryl Cole told British Vogue that she hesitated to breastfeed because of the effect it might have on her breasts. "I want to breastfeed," she said, "but I've seen what it can do, so I may have to reconsider." In actuality, breastfeeding is not considered to be a major contributor to ptosis of the breasts. In fact, the biggest factors affecting ptosis are cigarette smoking, a woman's body mass index (BMI), her number of pregnancies, her breast cup size before pregnancy, and age.

Breast size does not determine the amount of milk a woman will produce or whether she will be able to successfully breastfeed her baby. Larger breast size pre pregnancy is a sign there are more fatty cells within the breast, which do not affect milk production. A more important indicator is breast changes during the course of pregnancy. If a woman does not experience any nipple or breast changes during pregnancy this is an indication she may have a rare condition such as breast hypoplasia which could lead to more difficulty breastfeeding. Women whose breasts are simply smaller but who have experienced some breast changes are likely to have a successful breastfeeding experience.

== Cardiovascular ==
The heart adapts to the increased cardiac demand that occurs during pregnancy in many ways.

- Cardiac output (Lit./Min.): 6.26
- Stroke Volume (Ml.): 75
- Heart Rate (Per min.): 85
- Blood Pressure: Unaffected

Cardiac output increases throughout early pregnancy, and peaks in the third trimester, usually to 30-50% above baseline. Estrogen mediates this rise in cardiac output by increasing the pre-load and stroke volume, mainly via a higher overall blood volume (which increases by 40–50%). The heart rate increases, but generally not above 100 beats/ minute. Total systematic vascular resistance decreases by 20% secondary to the vasodilatory effect of progesterone. Overall, the systolic and diastolic blood pressure drops 10–15 mm Hg in the first trimester and then returns to baseline in the second half of pregnancy. All of these cardiovascular adaptations can lead to common complaints, such as palpitations, decreased exercise tolerance, and dizziness.

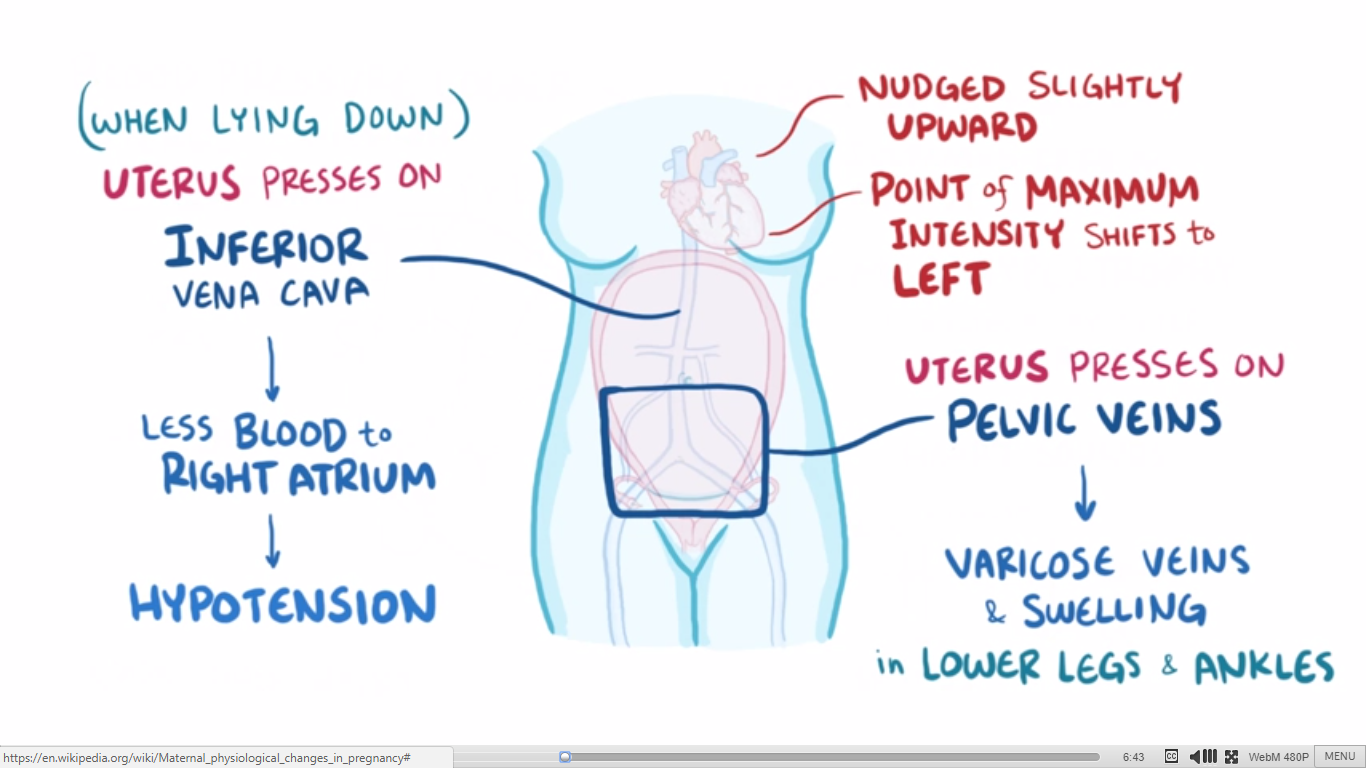
Uterine Compression of IVC and Pelvic Veins. Displacement of PMI by Uterus

Uterine enlargement beyond 20 weeks' size can compress the inferior vena cava, which can markedly decrease the return of blood into the heart or preload. As a result, healthy pregnancy patients in a supine position or prolonged standing can experience symptoms of hypotension.

== Hematology ==
=== Blood volume and hemoglobin concentration ===
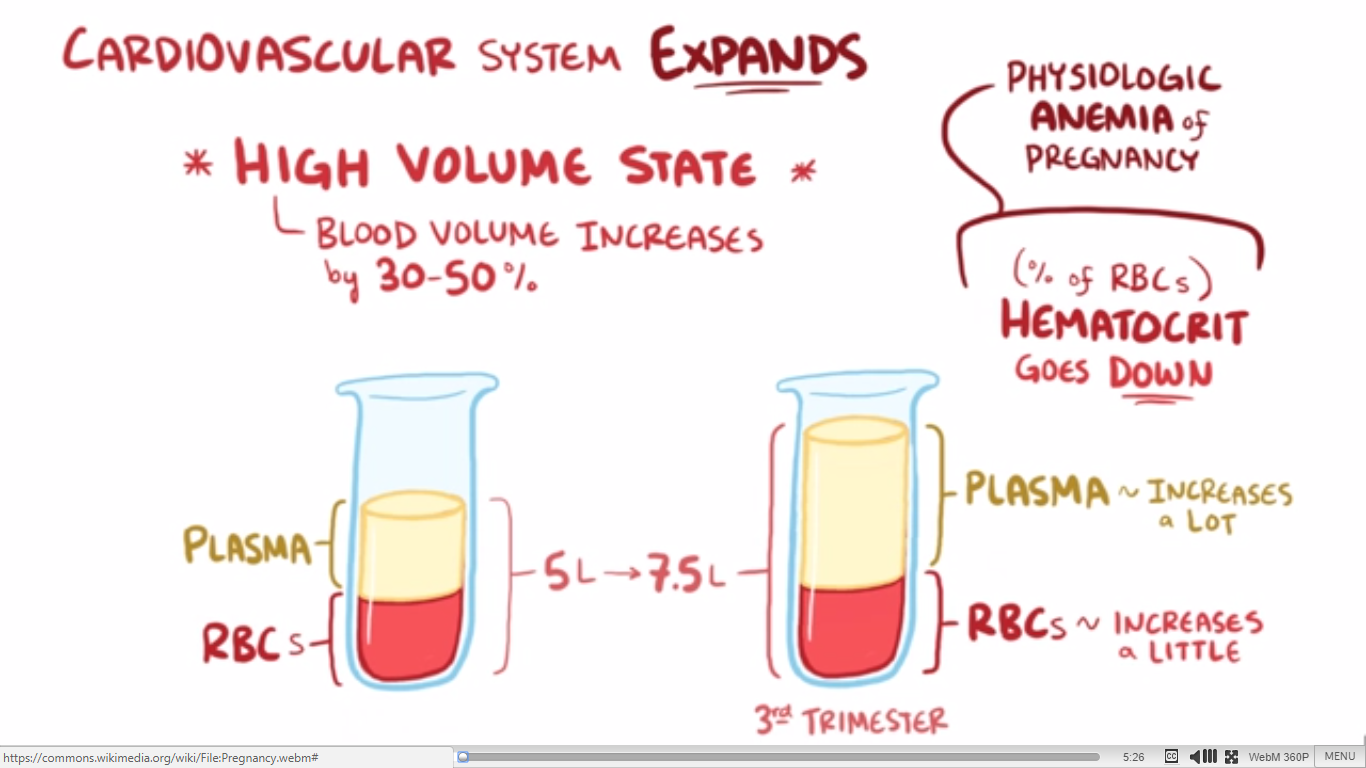
Maternal Blood Volume

During pregnancy plasma volume increases by 40-50% and the red blood cell volume increases only by 20–30%. These changes occur mostly in the second trimester and prior to 32 weeks gestation. Due to dilution, the net result is a decrease in hematocrit or hemoglobin, which are measures of red blood cell concentration. Erythropoietin, which stimulates red blood cell production, increases throughout pregnancy and reaches approximately 150 percent of their pregnancy levels at term. The slight drop in hematocrit or hemoglobin is most pronounced at the end of the second trimester and slowly improves when reaching term.

=== Platelet and white cell count ===
The effect of pregnancy on platelet count is unclear, with some studies demonstrating a mild decline in platelet count and other studies that show no effect. The white blood cell count increases with occasional appearance of myelocytes or metamyelocytes in the blood. During labor, there is a rise in leukocyte count.

=== Hypercoagulability ===
A pregnant woman will become hypercoagulable, leading to increased risk for developing blood clots and embolisms, such as deep vein thrombosis and pulmonary embolism. Women are 4-5 times more likely to develop a clot during pregnancy and in the postpartum period than when they are not pregnant. Hypercoagulability in pregnancy likely evolved to protect women from hemorrhage at the time of miscarriage or childbirth. In developing countries, the leading cause of maternal death is still hemorrhage. In the United States 2011-2013, hemorrhage made up of 11.4% and pulmonary embolisms made up of 9.2% of all pregnancy-related deaths.

The increased risk of clots can be attributed to several things. Plasma levels of pro-coagulation factors increased markedly in pregnancy, including: von Willebrand Factor, fibrinogen, factor VII, factor VIII, and factor X. Both the production of prostacyclin (an inhibitor of platelet aggregation) and thromboxane (an inducer of platelet aggregation and a vasoconstrictor) are increased, but overall there is an increase in platelet reactivity which can lead to a predisposition to clots. There is also increased blood stasis due to the compression of the vena cava by the enlarging uterus. Many factors have been shown to increase the risk of clots in pregnancy, including baseline thrombophilia, cesarean section, preeclampsia, etc. Clots usually develop in the left leg or the left iliac/ femoral venous system. Recently, there have been several case reports of May-Thurner Syndrome in pregnancy, where the right common iliac artery compresses the below left common iliac vein.

Absolute and relative incidence of venous thromboembolism (VTE) during pregnancy and the postpartum period
Absolute incidence of first VTE per 10,000 person–years during pregnancy and the postpartum period
	Swedish data A		Swedish data B		English data		Danish data	
Time period	N	Rate (95% CI)	N	Rate (95% CI)	NФВяы	Rate (95% CI)	N	Rate (95% CI)
Outside pregnancy	1105	4.2 (4.0–4.4)	1015	3.8 (?)	1480	3.2 (3.0–3.3)	2895	3.6 (3.4–3.7)
Antepartum	995	20.5 (19.2–21.8)	690	14.2 (13.2–15.3)	156	9.9 (8.5–11.6)	491	10.7 (9.7–11.6)
Trimester 1	207	13.6 (11.8–15.5)	172	11.3 (9.7–13.1)	23	4.6 (3.1–7.0)	61	4.1 (3.2–5.2)
Trimester 2	275	17.4 (15.4–19.6)	178	11.2 (9.7–13.0)	30	5.8 (4.1–8.3)	75	5.7 (4.6–7.2)
Trimester 3	513	29.2 (26.8–31.9)	340	19.4 (17.4–21.6)	103	18.2 (15.0–22.1)	355	19.7 (17.7–21.9)
Around delivery	115	154.6 (128.8–185.6)	79	106.1 (85.1–132.3)	34	142.8 (102.0–199.8)	–	
Postpartum	649	42.3 (39.2–45.7)	509	33.1 (30.4–36.1)	135	27.4 (23.1–32.4)	218	17.5 (15.3–20.0)
Early postpartum	584	75.4 (69.6–81.8)	460	59.3 (54.1–65.0)	177	46.8 (39.1–56.1)	199	30.4 (26.4–35.0)
Late postpartum	65	8.5 (7.0–10.9)	49	6.4 (4.9–8.5)	18	7.3 (4.6–11.6)	319	3.2 (1.9–5.0)
Incidence rate ratios (IRRs) of first VTE during pregnancy and the postpartum period
	Swedish data A		Swedish data B		English data		Danish data	
Time period	IRR* (95% CI)		IRR* (95% CI)		IRR (95% CI)†		IRR (95% CI)†	
Outside pregnancy	Reference (i.e., 1.00)							
Antepartum	5.08 (4.66–5.54)		3.80 (3.44–4.19)		3.10 (2.63–3.66)		2.95 (2.68–3.25)	
Trimester 1	3.42 (2.95–3.98)		3.04 (2.58–3.56)		1.46 (0.96–2.20)		1.12 (0.86–1.45)	
Trimester 2	4.31 (3.78–4.93)		3.01 (2.56–3.53)		1.82 (1.27–2.62)		1.58 (1.24–1.99)	
Trimester 3	7.14 (6.43–7.94)		5.12 (4.53–5.80)		5.69 (4.66–6.95)		5.48 (4.89–6.12)	
Around delivery	37.5 (30.9–44.45)		27.97 (22.24–35.17)		44.5 (31.68–62.54)		–	
Postpartum	10.21 (9.27–11.25)		8.72 (7.83–9.70)		8.54 (7.16–10.19)		4.85 (4.21–5.57)	
Early postpartum	19.27 (16.53–20.21)		15.62 (14.00–17.45)		14.61 (12.10–17.67)		8.44 (7.27–9.75)	
Late postpartum	2.06 (1.60–2.64)		1.69 (1.26–2.25)		2.29 (1.44–3.65)		0.89 (0.53–1.39)	
Notes: Swedish data A = Using any code for VTE regardless of confirmation. Swedish data B = Using only algorithm-confirmed VTE. Early postpartum = First 6 weeks after delivery. Late postpartum = More than 6 weeks after delivery. * = Adjusted for age and calendar year. † = Unadjusted ratio calculated based on the data provided. Source:

=== Edema ===
Edema, or swelling, of the feet is common during pregnancy, partly because the enlarging uterus compresses veins and lymphatic drainage from the legs.

== Metabolic ==
During pregnancy, both protein metabolism and carbohydrate metabolism are affected. One kilogram of extra protein is deposited, with half going to the fetus and placenta, and another half going to uterine contractile proteins, breast glandular tissue, plasma protein, and haemoglobin.

An increased requirement for nutrients is given by fetal growth and fat deposition. Changes are caused by steroid hormones, lactogen, and cortisol.

Maternal insulin resistance can lead to gestational diabetes. Increased liver metabolism is also seen, with increased gluconeogenesis to increase maternal glucose levels.

=== Body weight ===
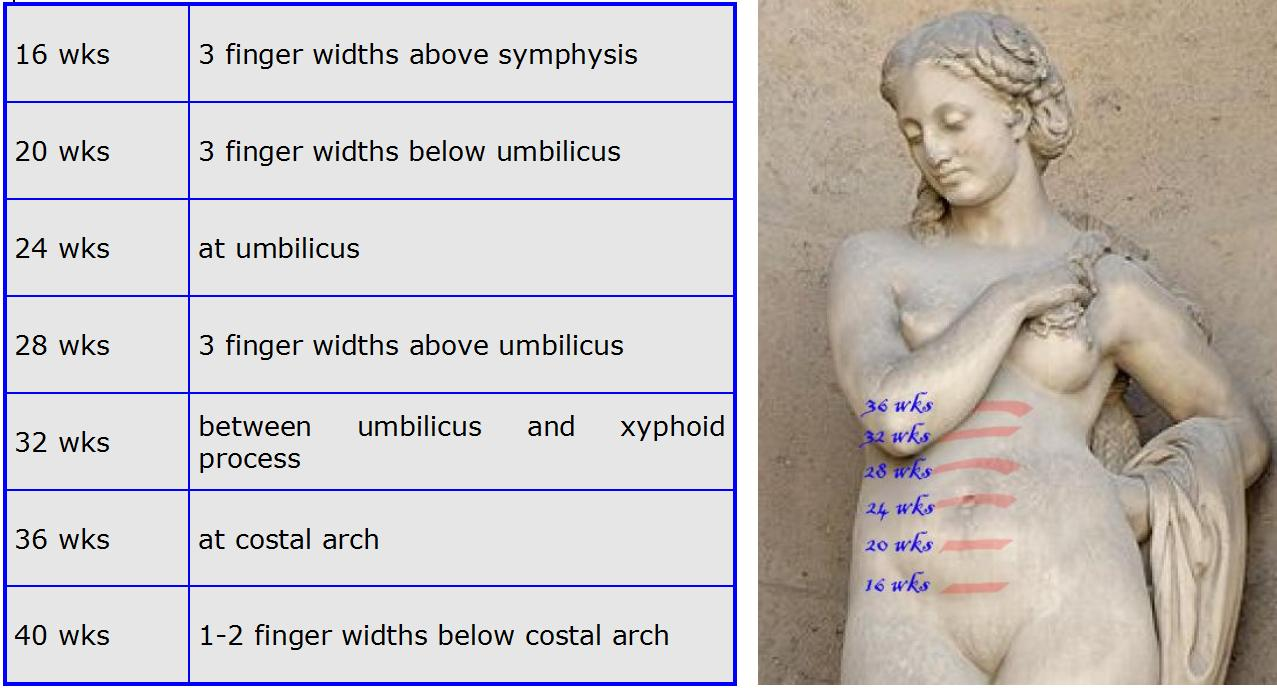
Illustration of fundal height at various points during pregnancy

Weight gain is expected during pregnancy. The enlarging uterus, growing fetus, placenta, amniotic fluid, normal increase in body fat, and increase in water retention all contribute weight gain during pregnancy. The amount of weight gain can vary from 5 pounds (2.3 kg) to over 100 pounds (45 kg). In the United States, the range of weight gain that's generally recommended is 25 pounds (11 kg) to 35 pounds (16 kg), less if the woman is overweight, more (up to 40 pounds (18 kg)) if the woman is underweight.

=== Nutrition ===
Nutritionally, pregnant women require a caloric increase of 350 kcal/day and an increase in protein to 70 or 75 g/day. There is also an increased folate requirement from 0.4 to 0.8 mg/day (important in preventing neural tube defects). On average, a weight gain of 25 to 35 lb (11 to 16 kg) is experienced.

All patients are advised to take prenatal vitamins to compensate for the increased nutritional requirements. Choline supplementation of research mammals supports mental development that lasts throughout life.

== Renal and lower reproductive tract ==
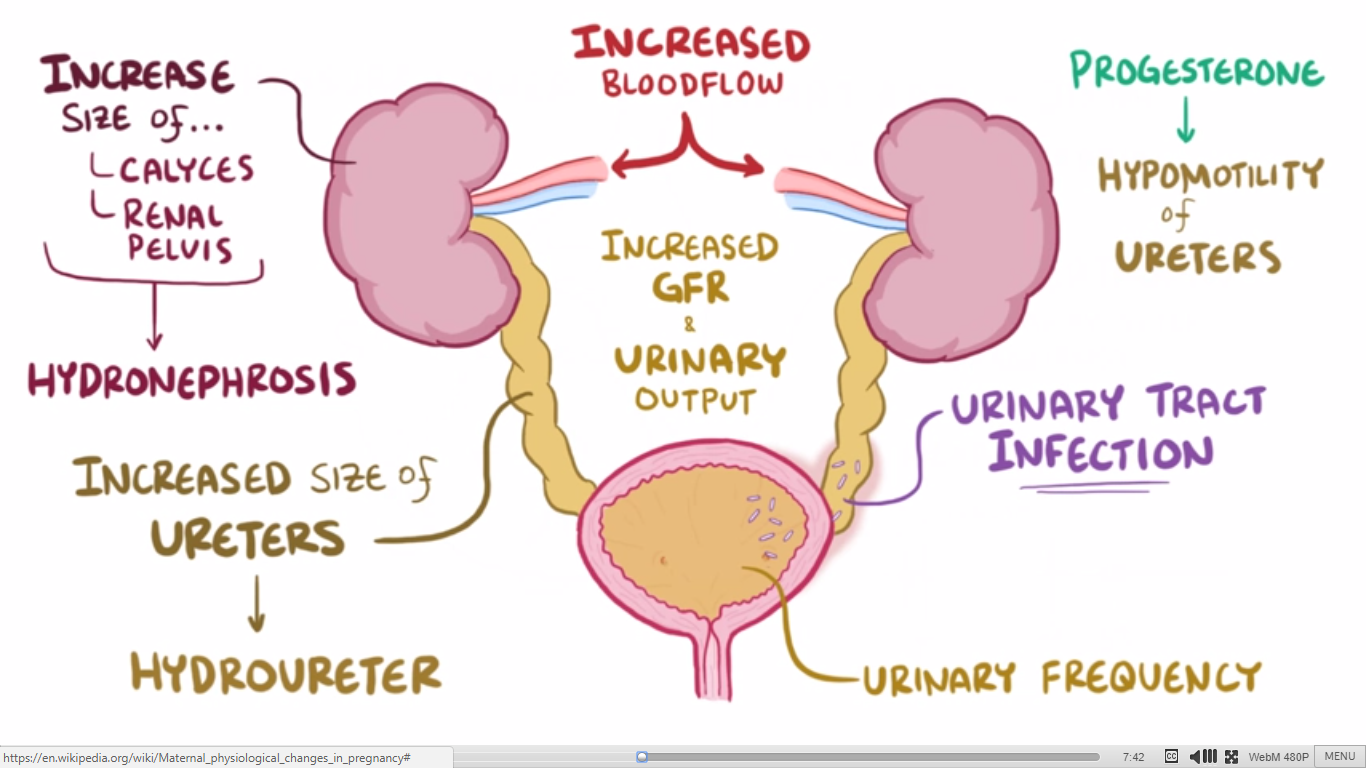
Genitourinary Changes in Pregnancy

Progesterone causes many changes to the genitourinary system. A pregnant woman may experience an increase in the size of the kidneys and ureter due to the increase blood volume and vasculature. Later in pregnancy, the woman might develop physiological hydronephrosis and hydroureter, which is normal. Progesterone causes vasodilatation and increased blood flow to the kidneys, and glomerular filtration rate (GFR) commonly increases by 50%, returning to normal around 20 weeks postpartum. The increased GFR increases the excretion of protein, albumin, and glucose. The increased GFR leads to increased urinary output, which the woman may experience as increased urinary frequency. Progesterone also causes decreased motility of the ureters, which can lead to stasis of the urine and hence an increased risk of urinary tract infection.

Pregnancy alters the vaginal microbiota with a reduction in species/genus diversity. Physiological hydronephrosis may appear from six weeks.

== Gastrointestinal ==
Changes in the gastrointestinal (GI) system during pregnancy are caused by the enlarging uterus and hormonal changes of pregnancy. Anatomically, the intestine and stomach are pushed up from their original positions by the enlarging uterus. While it remains unclear whether there are any intrinsic changes in the sizes of the GI organs in humans, the portal vein increases in size due to the hyperdynamic state of pregnancy. However, recent studies suggest that the maternal intestine grows during pregnancy, at least in mice, hence it is likely that similar changes happen during human pregnancy too.

Elevated levels of progesterone and estrogen mediate most of the functional changes of the GI system during pregnancy. Progesterone causes smooth muscle relaxation which slows down GI motility and decreases lower esophageal sphincter (LES) tone. The resulting increase in intragastric pressure combined with lower LES tone leads to the gastroesophageal reflux commonly experienced during pregnancy.

The increased occurrence of gallstones during pregnancy is due to inhibition of gallbladder contraction (as result of increased smooth muscle relaxation mediated by progesterone) and reduced biliary transportation of bile (mediated by estrogen) which results in cholestasis of pregnancy.

Nausea and vomiting during pregnancy, commonly known as morning sickness, is one of the most common GI symptoms of pregnancy. It begins between the 4 and 8 weeks of pregnancy and usually subsides by 14 to 16 weeks. The exact cause of nausea is not fully understood but it correlates with the rise in the levels of human chorionic gonadotropin, progesterone, and the resulting relaxation of smooth muscle of the stomach. Hyperemesis gravidarum, which is a severe form of nausea and vomiting during pregnancy, can lead to nutritional deficiencies, weight loss, electrolytes imbalance and is one of the leading causes of hospitalization in the first trimester of pregnancy.

Constipation is another GI symptom that is common during pregnancy. It is associated with the narrowing of the colon as it gets pushed by the growing uterus found adjacent, leading to mechanical blockade. Reduced motility in the entire GI system as well as increased absorption of water during pregnancy are thought to be contributing factors.

Taste, smell, and hunger. Dietary cravings and dietary as well as olfactory avoidance of certain types of food are common in pregnancy. Although the exact mechanisms of these symptoms are not fully explained, it is thought that dietary cravings may arise from the thought that certain foods might help relieve nausea. Pica, which is the intense craving for unusual materials such as clay and ice has also been reported in pregnancy.

Hemorrhoids and gingival disease are two common pregnancy associated findings involving the gastrointestinal system. Hemorrhoids arise as a result of constipation and venous congestion that are common in pregnancy. Gingival disease is thought to be related to gum softening and edema (swelling from fluid collection) that is mostly observed in pregnancy. The mechanism and reason for the gingival changes are poorly understood.

== Immune tolerance ==
The fetus inside a pregnant woman may be viewed as an unusually successful allograft, since it genetically differs from the woman. In the same way, many cases of spontaneous abortion may be described in the same way as maternal transplant rejection.

== Musculoskeletal ==
Neuromechanical adaptations to pregnancy refers to the change in gait, postural parameters, as well as sensory feedback, due to the numerous anatomical, physiological, and hormonal changes women experience during pregnancy. Such changes increase their risk for musculoskeletal disorders and fall injuries. Musculoskeletal disorders include lower-back pain, leg cramps, and hip pain. Pregnant women fall at a similar rate (27%) to women over age of 70 years (28%). Most of the falls (64%) occur during the second trimester. Additionally, two-thirds of falls are associated with walking on slippery floors, rushing, or carrying an object. The root causes for these falls are not well known. However, some factors that may contribute to these injuries include deviations from normal posture, balance, and gait.

The body's posture changes as the pregnancy progresses. The pelvis tilts and the back arches to help keep balance. Poor posture occurs naturally from the stretching of the woman's abdominal muscles as the fetus grows. These muscles are less able to contract and keep the lower back in proper alignment. The pregnant woman has a different pattern of gait. The step lengthens as the pregnancy progresses, due to weight gain and changes in posture. On average, a woman's foot can grow by a half size or more during pregnancy. In addition, the increased body weight of pregnancy, fluid retention, and weight gain lowers the arches of the foot, further adding to the foot's length and width. The influences of increased hormones such as estrogen and relaxin initiate the remodeling of soft tissues, cartilage and ligaments. Certain skeletal joints such as the pubic symphysis and sacroiliac widen or have increased laxity.

The addition of mass, particularly around the torso, naturally changes a pregnant mother's center of mass (COM). The change in COM requires pregnant mothers to adjust their bodies to maintain balance.

=== Lumbar lordosis ===
To positionally compensate the additional load due to the pregnancy, pregnant mothers often extend their lower backs. As the fetal load increases, women tend to arch their lower backs, specifically in the lumbar region of their vertebral column to maintain postural stability and balance. The arching of the lumbar region is known as lumbar lordosis, which recovers the center of mass into a stable position by reducing hip torque. According to a study conducted by Whitcome, et al., lumbar lordosis can increase from an angle of 32 degrees at 0% fetal mass (i.e. non-pregnant women or very early in pregnancy) to 50 degrees at 100% fetal mass (very late in pregnancy). Postpartum, the angle of the lordosis declines and can reach the angle prior to pregnancy. Unfortunately, while lumbar lordosis reduces hip torque, it also exacerbates spinal shearing load, which may be the cause for the common lower back pain experienced by pregnant women.

=== Evolutionary implications ===
Given the demands of fetal loading during pregnancy and the importance of producing offspring to the fitness of human beings, natural selection may have had a role in selecting a unique anatomy for the lumbar region in females. There are sex differences in the lumbar vertebral column of human males and females, which ultimately helps mitigate some of the discomfort due to the fetal load in females. There are 5 vertebrae in the lumbar region for both males and females. However, the 3 lower vertebrae of a female's lumbar region are dorsally wedged while for males, only the lower 2 of the lumbar region are dorsally wedged. When a female arches her lower back, such as during fetal loading, having an extra dorsally wedged vertebra lessens the shearing force. This lumbar sexual dimorphism in humans suggests high natural selection pressures have been acting to improve maternal performance in posture and locomotion during pregnancy.

If natural selection has acted on the lumbar region of Homo sapiens to create this sexual dimorphism, then this sort of trait should also be apparent in the genus Australopithecus, hominins that have been known to be habitually bipedal for at least 2 million years after the earliest bipedal hominins. Currently there are 2 nearly complete australopith lumbar segments; one has three dorsally wedged vertebrae in the lumbar region while the other has two. An explanation for these findings is that the first one is a female, while the latter is a male. This sort of evidence supports the notion that natural selection has played a dimorphic role in designing the anatomy of the vertebral lumbar region.

=== Postural stability ===
The weight added during the progression of pregnancy also affects the ability to maintain balance.

==== Perception ====
Pregnant women have a decreased perception of balance during quiet standing, which is confirmed by an increase in anterior-posterior (front to back) sway. This relationship heightens as pregnancy progresses and significantly decreases postpartum. To compensate for the decrease in balance stability (both actual and perceived), stance width increases to maintain postural stability.

==== Response to perturbations ====
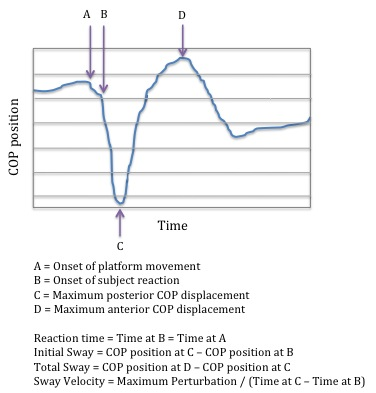
As measured by a force platform, parameters used to measure postural stability. Adapted from McCrory et al. 2010

Under dynamic postural stability, which can be defined as the response to anterior (front) and posterior (back) translation perturbations, the effects of pregnancy are different. Initial sway, total sway, and sway velocity (see figure for description of variables) are significantly less during the third trimester than during the second trimester and when compared to non-pregnant women. These biomechanical characteristics are possible reasons why falls are more prevalent during the second trimester during pregnancy.

Additionally, the time it takes for pregnant women (any stage of pregnancy) to react to a translational disturbance is not significantly different than that of non-pregnant women. This alludes to some sort of stability mechanism that allow pregnant women to compensate for the changes they experience during pregnancy.

=== Gait ===
Gait in pregnant women often appear as a "waddle" – a forward gait that includes a lateral component. However, research has shown that the forward gait alone remains unchanged during pregnancy. It has been found that gait parameters such as gait kinematics, (velocity, stride length, and cadence) remain unchanged during the third trimester of pregnancy and 1 year after delivery. These parameters suggest that there is no change in forward movement. There is, though, a significant increase in kinetic gait parameters, which may be used to explain how gait motion remains relatively unchanged despite increase in body mass, width and changes in mass distribution about the waist during pregnancy. These kinetic gait parameters suggest an increased use of hip abductor, hip extensor, and ankle plantar flexor muscle groups. To compensate for these gait deviations, pregnant women often make adaptations that can result in musculoskeletal injuries. While the idea of "waddling" cannot be dispensed, these results suggest that exercise and conditioning may help relieve these injuries.

== Respiratory ==
There are many physiologic changes that occur during pregnancy that influence respiratory status and function. Progesterone has noticeable effects on respiratory physiology, increasing minute volume (the amount of air breathed in and out of the lungs in 1 minute) by 40% in the first trimester via an increase in tidal volume alone, as the respiratory rate does not change during pregnancy. As a result, carbon dioxide levels in the blood decrease and the pH of the blood becomes more alkaline (i.e. the pH is higher and more basic). This causes the maternal kidneys to excrete bicarbonate to compensate for this change in pH. The combined effect of the decreased serum concentrations of both carbon dioxide and bicarbonate leads to a slight overall increase in blood pH (to 7.44 compared to 7.40 in the non-pregnant state). If an arterial blood gas (ABG) specimen is drawn on a pregnant woman, it would therefore reveal respiratory alkalosis (from the decrease in serum carbon dioxide mediated by the lungs) with a compensatory metabolic acidosis (from the decrease in serum bicarbonate mediated by the kidneys).

As the uterus and fetus continue to enlarge over time, the diaphragm progressively becomes more upwardly displaced. This causes less space to be available for lung expansion in the chest cavity, and leads to a decrease in expiratory reserve volume and residual volume. This culminates in a 20% decrease in functional residual capacity (FRC) during the course of the pregnancy.

Oxygen consumption increases by 20% to 40% during pregnancy, as the oxygen demand of the growing fetus, placenta, and increased metabolic activity of the maternal organs all increase the pregnant woman's overall oxygen requirements. This increase in oxygen consumption paired with the decrease in FRC can potentially mean that pregnant people with pre-existing and/or comorbid asthma, pneumonia, or other respiratory issues may be more prone to disease exacerbation and respiratory decompensation during pregnancy.

== See also ==
- Parental brain
- Postpartum physiological changes
- Symptoms and discomforts of pregnancy
