= Internment camp in Vernon =

Vernon Internment Camp
- Location within British Columbia
- Coordinates: 50°16′00″N 119°16′18″W
- Opened: September 14th, 1914
- Closed: February 20th, 1920

An Internment Camp in Vernon, British Columbia was established to hold enemy aliens and POWs during World War I. After Canada entered the war, fears of enemy aliens on the home front began to arise. To combat this, the Canadian Government implemented the War Measures Act which gave them the authority to intern and disenfranchise enemy aliens living in Canada. Approximately 8,500 enemy aliens were interned across Canada, with majority of the 24 camps located around the Rocky Mountains and large population centres in Ontario. Vernon housed the permanent camp in British Columbia, operating from September 18, 1914, to February 20, 1920.

== History ==
=== Immigration ===
Before the start of the First World War, the German Canadian population consisted of German-speakers from many parts of Europe other than the German Empire, the United States, and Eastern Canada. As a result the German Canadian population in Western Canada could not be denominated in a cohesive cultural or national identity. German-speaking immigrants were heterogeneous in origins, cultural practices, religions, social classes, and professions; their only similarity was their language and desire to prosper in British Columbia.

The first wave of German immigrants started in 1858 during the height of the Fraser Canyon Gold Rush. This flow of people continued through the periods of the Cariboo Gold Rush and other British Columbia Gold rushes throughout the 19th century. By 1911 4.5% of British Columbia's population were people of German or Austro-Hungarian ancestry. Approximately 11,880 people of German ancestry were British subjects by birth or naturalization; only 25.7% had been born in continental Europe.

After the first wave of immigration, the majority of German Canadians were more or less naturalized with the settler population in British Columbia. Many German settlers encountered few difficulties in adapting to their social and economic life in British Columbia with many marrying into Canadian families. Middle-class immigrants from southwest Germany arrived in the newly settled Vancouver, opening services and retail businesses. Some German immigrants from the United States, adapting their language and cultural norms, found some difficulties integrating with their Canadian communities.

=== Trade and money ===
The German language was used a tool for economic and political influence. Attracted by high wages, German immigrants in British Columbia consisted of two main groups: skilled workers and merchants, and a smaller group of well-educated upper-middle class entrepreneurs. Unlike their less-educated and less-skilled Austrian-Hungarian counterparts, German immigrants were generally well-received by British Columbians. Even though Canadians still perceived naturalized German citizens as 'foreigners,' German immigrants were viewed in a more positive light. Concurrent with the prevalent racial theory and pseudo-Darwinian view of nations during the 19th century, Canadian immigration agents believed that Germans would easily assimilate into Canada's "Anglo-Saxon Civilization" due to their cultural kinship with the British. Germans were admired for their scientific, industrial, and artistic traits; they were also seen as industrious, rational, and orderly.

=== Religion ===
German Lutheran Missionaries have been a historical part of the culture and values that shaped British Columbian society. Between 1880 and 1930, five million German speaking peoples entered Canada. A majority of them were Lutheran but exact records that correlated language and religion were not kept. German speaking immigrants gathered around auslandsdeutsche, German congregations abroad. Local Lutheran leaders did not ask for help from their churches back in Germany and they autonomously raised their own money, trained their own pastors and set up their own institutions. Compared to Germans that migrated to South American regions like as Rio de la Plata, North American immigrants were given more freedom. This was due to no perceived threat of conversion to Catholicism. Local German-Canadians did not show eager interest in keeping ties to the Empire and to Weimar Germany. This autonomous and Protestant influence is apparent in the nature of English Canada. Nonetheless, German and Lutheran are not unitary categories. These groups overlap but can differ.

== Internment ==
After reports of attacks on British officers and soldiers on Canadian soil by German spies, and threats to infrastructure by saboteurs; the Canadian government implemented The War Measures Act. This legislation authorized the detainment of German and Austro-Hungarian "enemy aliens" in the name of national security and public safety. Public opinion had also shifted. Many enemy aliens lost their employment immediately and had to rely on the welfare of a hostile public. Major General William Dillon Otter was put in charge of the internment efforts during World War I. In total twenty-four camps were established across Canada to hold 8,579 'enemy aliens.' Another 80,000 Austro-Hungarians living in Canada had to register with the federal government as 'enemy aliens.' Those not sent to internment camps were forced to carry identifying documents with them at all times. The state of the camps varied widely across the country, from simple tents and bunkhouses built by internees on arrival in Mara Lake, BC to military forts like Halifax, NS, to provincial government buildings like the one in Vernon, BC.

The internment camps in British Columbia were concentrated in the Okanagan valley in the interior of the province and on Vancouver Island. Vernon and Spirit Lake, Quebec, were the only camps to hold women and children during the internment. Located on a ten-acre lot, on what is now W.L. Seaton Secondary School and Macdonald Park, the Vernon internment camp housed nearly 500 people in a building built for 80. The site of the camp started as a jail in 1902, followed by an asylum, and then a hospital through 1912.

In 1914 the site became an internment camp. With three work camps located in British Columbia, those interned found "there was no grueling labour to be done at the Vernon Camp." The Mara Lake, Monashee and Edgewood camp, all located in the Okanagan Valley, contributed to lasting infrastructure projects in the region, like linking Vernon and Kelowna to the Trans-Canada Highway in Sicamous, BC. Internee labour was also utilised in the logging and mining industries in the Rocky Mountains.

As the war progressed, a labour shortage began to grip Canada's economy, specifically in the farming and manufacturing. In response many internees were permitted to work in agriculture, freeing Canadians to work in war-related manufacturing jobs. Shutting down operations on February 20, 1920, The Vernon camp was the second to last internment to close after World War One (the final one being Kapuskasing, Ontario four days later).

=== Notable internee deaths ===
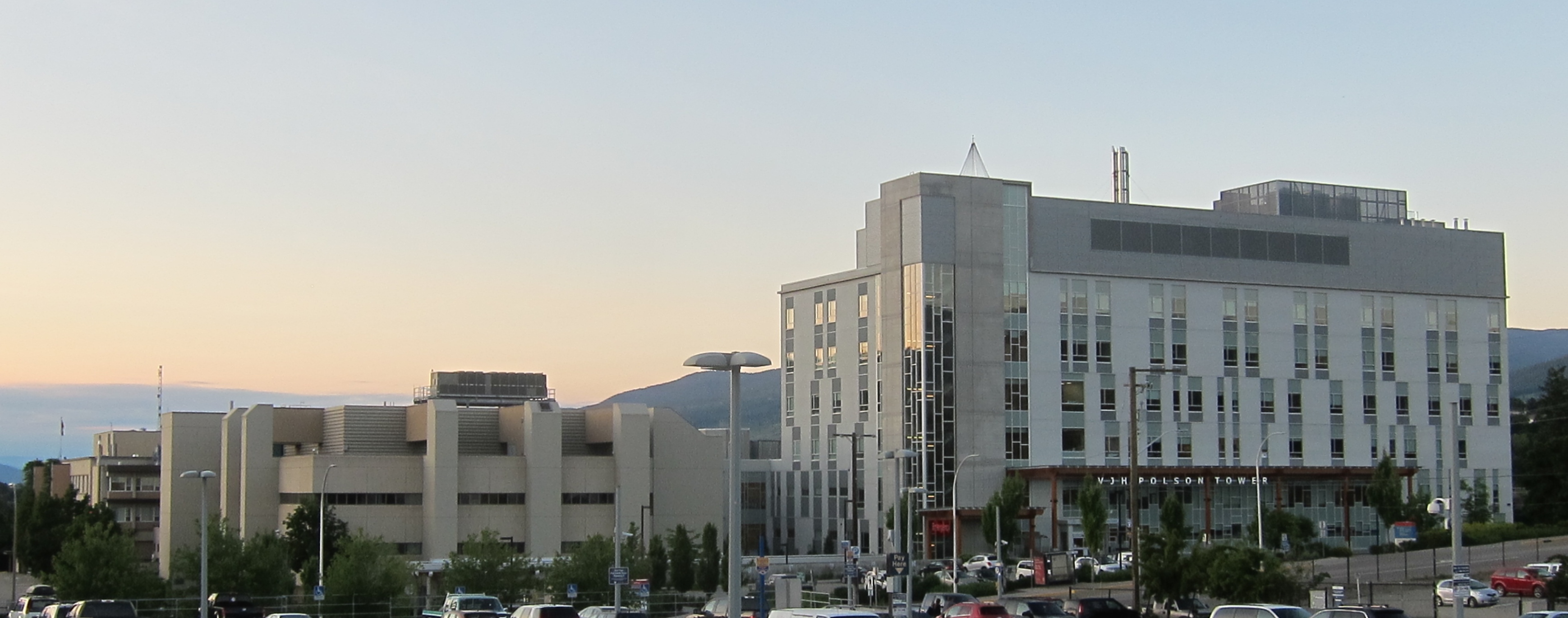
Vernon Jubilee Hospital; treated sick and wounded internees during incarceration.

- Mile Hećimović
- Bernard Heiny
- Ivan Jugo
- Karl Johann Keck
- Timoti Korejczuk
- Leo Mueller
- Stipan Šapina
- Wasyl Shapka
- Jure Vukorepa
- Samuel Vulović
- Wilhelm Heinrich Eduard Wolter

== Aftermath and legacy ==
During World War II, the Canadian government established and continued the operations of many internment camps to detain 'enemy aliens' – a term that included Canadian citizens of German, Italian, and Japanese descent, who were deemed potential threats to national security. The legacy of German internment camps in Canada remains particularly undocumented. German Canadians were registered as enemy aliens and around 8000 were interned in camps across the country – including in Vernon, BC. These camps were often remote locations, with poor living conditions, and inadequate healthcare. The detainees were forced to work for the government, participating in labour such as road-building or farm work for little to no pay.

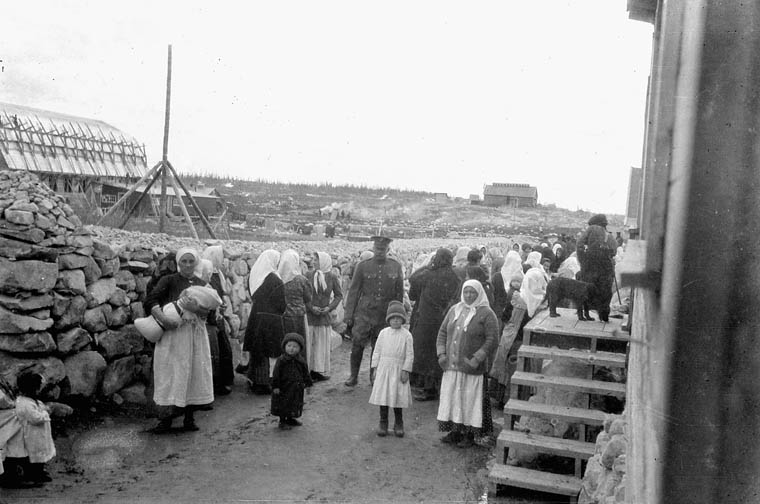
Women and Children at the Spirit Lake internment camp

=== Legacy ===
The internment of those in Vernon, BC has little documentation. There is little evidence of brutality, but the national director of the program described it as being 'the most difficult of [their] camps'. Conditions at the camp were harsh with internees staying in tents that provided little to no protection from the cold and damp climate of the Okanagan Valley. The camps were unsanitary and overcrowded. Internees were subject to strict rules and infractions could result in punishment, including solitary confinement. There have been efforts to acknowledge and address the legacy of the Vernon Internment Camp. In 2020 the City of Vernon unveiled a plaque at MacDonald Park to commemorate the internment of German Canadians at the site of the former camp.

Japanese-Canadians who were put in internment camps received a $100M redress package and a publicly addressed formal apology in 2012 from the Canadian Government. In 2018, the Ukrainian Canadian Congress launched a petition calling on the Canadian government to acknowledge the internment of Ukrainian Canadians during WWII. This petition also highlighted the internment of German Canadians. In spite of this, German Canadians have yet to receive any redress or acknowledgement from the Canadian Government.

The internment experience resulted in the loss of personal property, financial ruin, and stigmatization. Many families were separated for years and some were never reunited. The trauma of internment was passed down through generations, as families struggled to reconcile their identity as Canadians with experiences rooted in persecution and injustice. Fear of discrimination caused German families in Canada to change their last names. An article in the Vancouver Sun, urged German-born residents to change their names. Some German immigrant communities such as Berlin, Ontario were even renamed (now Kitchener, Ontario) in fear of discrimination and targeted attacks.

== See also ==
- List of World War I prisoner-of-war camps in Canada
- List of World War II prisoner-of-war camps in Canada
- Ukrainian-Canadian Internement
- Human Rights in Canada
