= Frontiers in Neuroendocrinology =

- Discipline: Neuroendocrinology
- Language: English
- Edited by: L. Galea

Publication details
- History: 1980–present
- Publisher: Elsevier
- Frequency: Quarterly
- Impact factor: 7.037 (2014)

Standard abbreviations
- ISO 4: Front. Neuroendocrinol.

Indexing
- CODEN: FNEDA7
- ISSN: 0091-3022 (print); 1095-6808 (web)
- LCCN: 77082030
- OCLC no.: 421849899

Links
- Journal homepage; Online access

Frontiers in Neuroendocrinology is a quarterly peer-reviewed scientific journal covering all aspects of neuroendocrinology. It was established in 1980 and is published by Elsevier. The editor-in-chief is Liisa Galea (University of British Columbia).

== Abstracting and indexing ==
The journal is abstracted and indexed in:

- BIOSIS Previews
- Current Contents/Life Sciences
- MEDLINE/PubMed
- PsycINFO/Psychological Abstracts
- Scopus
- Science Citation Index

According to the Journal Citation Reports, the journal has a 2014 impact factor of 7.037.
