= List of University Professors at Harvard University =

At Harvard University, the title of University Professor is the institution's most distinguished professorial post, and is conferred upon a select group of tenured faculty members whose scholarship and other professional work have achieved exceptional distinction and influence. Established in 1935, this position enables scholars to work across disciplines and at any of Harvard's schools.

The number of University Professors has increased over time, made possible by new endowed gifts to the university. In 2006, there were 21 University Professors. As of 2022, the total had risen to 25 University Professors.

== Present Harvard University professors ==
=== Biologists or medical researchers ===
- Catherine Dulac – Xander University Professor
- Marc Kirschner – John Franklin Enders University Professor
- Douglas A. Melton – Xander University Professor
- Arlene H. Sharpe – Kolokotrones University Professorship

=== Economists ===
- Claudia Goldin – Samuel W. Morris University Professor
- Sir Oliver Hart – Lewis P. and Linda L. Geyser University Professor
- Rebecca M. Henderson – John and Natty McArthur University Professor
- Eric Maskin – Adams University Professor
- Michael Porter – Bishop William Lawrence University Professor
- Amartya Sen – Thomas W. Lamont University Professor
- Lawrence Summers – Charles W. Eliot University Professor

=== Historians and lawyers ===
- Ann M. Blair – Carl H. Pforzheimer University Professor
- Peter Galison – Joseph Pellegrino University Professor
- Annette Gordon-Reed – Carl M. Loeb University Professor
- Noah Feldman – A. Kingsley Porter University Professor
- Martha Minow – Three Hundredth Anniversary University Professor
- Cass Sunstein – Robert Walmsley University Professor

=== Political scientists ===
- Danielle Allen – James Bryant Conant University Professor
- Gary King – Albert J. Weatherhead III University Professor

=== Other disciplines ===
- Carolyn Abbate – Paul and Catherine Buttenwieser University Professor
- Henry Louis Gates Jr. – Alphonse Fletcher University Professor
- Stephen Greenblatt – John Cogan University Professor
- Mikhail Lukin – Joshua and Beth Friedman University Professor
- Barry Mazur – Gerhard Gade University Professor
- Robert J. Sampson – Woodford L. and Ann A. Flowers University Professor
- Cumrun Vafa – Timken University Professor

== Notable past Harvard University professors ==
- Paul Farmer – Kolokotrones University Professor
- Dale W. Jorgenson – Samuel W. Morris University Professor
- Robert Nozick – Joseph Pellegrino University Professor
- Stephen Owen – James Bryant Conant University Professor
- Cornel West – Alphonse Fletcher University Professor, resigned chair and left Harvard in 2002
- George Whitesides – Woodford L. and Ann A. Flowers University Professor
- E. O. Wilson – Joseph Pellegrino University Professor
