= International Marcé Society =

- Formation: 1980

The International Marcé Society, named after Louis-Victor Marcé, is an academic society founded in 1980 by a group of researchers in the United Kingdom, dedicated to advancing understanding of perinatal mental health. Its official journal is the Archives of Women's Mental Health, with editors that include Jodi Pawluski.
