= Rebecca M. Henderson =

American economist

Rebecca Henderson
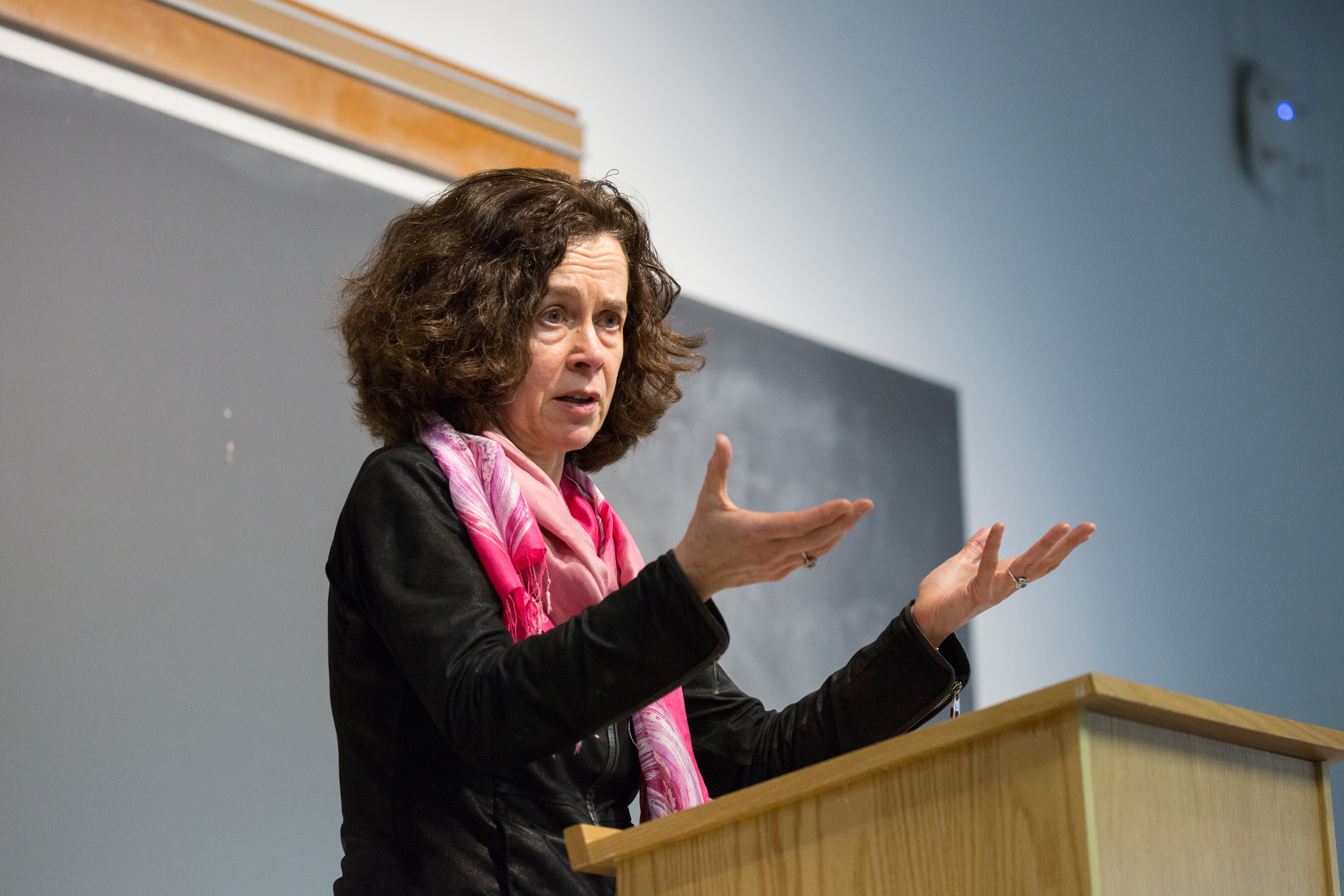
- Henderson in 2017

Academic background
- Education: Harvard University; Massachusetts Institute of Technology
- Website: https://rebeccahenderson.com/; Information at IDEAS / RePEc

Rebecca M. Henderson, FBA is an American economist, currently the John and Natty McArthur University Professor at Harvard Business School.

She teaches Reimagining Capitalism in the Master of Business Administration (MBA) Program.

From 1998 to 2009, Professor Henderson was the Eastman Kodak Professor of Management at the Sloan School of the Massachusetts Institute of Technology. She received an undergraduate degree in mechanical engineering from MIT and a doctorate in business economics from Harvard.

== Honours ==
In July 2017, Henderson was elected a Corresponding Fellow of the British Academy (FBA), the United Kingdom's national academy for the humanities and social sciences.
