= W.L. Seaton Secondary School =

Dual Track French Immersion High school in Vernon, British Columbia, Canada

W.L. Seaton Secondary

Location
- 2701 41st Ave; Vernon, British Columbia, V1T 6X3; Canada; 50.2725°N 119.2666°W

Information
- School type: Public, high school
- Opened: 1949
- School board: School District 22 Vernon
- Superintendent: Karla Mitchell
- Principal: Gus Busenius
- Grades: 8-12
- Enrollment: 1065 (2025/2026)
- Colours: Blue and White
- Team name: Sonics
- Website: https://wlseaton.sd22.bc.ca/
- Last updated: October 3, 2026

W.L. Seaton Secondary is a public high school in Vernon, British Columbia, Canada, located near city centre. It is part of School District 22 Vernon. Seaton secondary is one of several high schools in the Vernon area.

The school was opened in 1949 and was originally a junior high school but would eventually become a secondary school.

The school is situated on a former W.W.I. internment camp. The school's drama department wrote and performed a play, Seeds of Hope, which they performed in 2021, although on live stream due to COVID-19 restrictions.

== Notable alumni ==
- Jodi Pawluski
