= Liisa Galea =

Canadian neuroscientist

Liisa Ann Margaret Galea
- Education: Queen's University at Kingston; University of Western Ontario
- Scientific career
- Workplaces: Rockefeller University; University of British Columbia; University of Toronto
- Thesis: Developmental, hormonal and neural aspects of spatial learning in rodents. (1996)
- Doctoral advisor: Doreen Kimura
- Website: Galea Lab

Liisa Ann Margaret Galea is a Canadian neuroscientist who is a professor of psychology at the University of British Columbia and psychiatry at the University of Toronto. She is a member of UBC's Centre for Brain Health and director of the graduate programme in neuroscience, and a faculty member at U of T's psychiatry department. Her research considers the impact of hormones on brain health and behaviour.

== Early life and education ==
Galea is of Estonian and Maltese heritage. Her mother, an accountant, escaped the Iron Curtain during World War II, first to Sweden and eventually to Canada. Galea grew up in Toronto. She studied psychology and engineering at Queen's University at Kingston. She moved to the University of Western Ontario (UWO) for her doctoral studies, where she investigated developmental and hormonal aspects of spatial learning. She was one of the first graduates of the doctoral degree in neuroscience at UWO. After completing her doctoral research Galea moved to the Rockefeller University as a postdoctoral research associate.

== Research and career ==
Galea's body of work has added to our knowledge of how circulating hormones, and life events such as pregnancy and aging, impact cognition.

Galea moved to the University of British Columbia as an assistant professor in 1997. She spent five years at UBC before moving to the University of Toronto as associate professor. Galea was appointed associate professor at UBC in 2003, where she was eventually made full professor and director of the graduate programme in neuroscience. Her research considers behavioural neuroscience, and the impact of hormones on brain health and function. Different to most neuroscientists, Galea studies the female brain.

In particular, Galea is interested in the neural consequences of stress, the impacts of pregnancy and mothering on memory, as well as the development of preclinical models for postpartum depression. She has shown that brain function improves in motherhood, with mothers scoring better in multi-tasking and memory tasks than those who have not given birth. Galea has advocated for the proper consideration of women's health in medical research. She serves as editor-in-chief of Frontiers in Neuroendocrinology.

== Awards and honours ==
- 2009 Kavli Foundation Fellow
- 2012 Association for Psychological Science James McKeen Cattell Fund Sabbatical Fellowship
- 2015 Vancouver YWCA Women of Distinction Award
- 2015 University of British Columbia Dean of Arts Faculty Research Award
- 2018 NSERC Discovery Accelerator Supplement
- 2019 Michael Smith Foundation for Health Research Award

== Selected publications ==
- Elizabeth Gould; McEwen BS; Patima Tanapat; Galea LA; Eberhard Fuchs (1997). "Neurogenesis in the dentate gyrus of the adult tree shrew is regulated by psychosocial stress and NMDA receptor activation". The Journal of Neuroscience. 17 (7): 2492–2498. doi:10.1523/jneurosci.17-07-02492.1997. PMC 6573503. PMID 9065509. Wikidata Q64385755.
- Galea, Liisa; McEwen BS; Tanapat P; Deak T; Spencer RL; Dhabhar FS (1997). "Sex differences in dendritic atrophy of CA3 pyramidal neurons in response to chronic restraint stress". Neuroscience. 81 (3): 689–697. doi:10.1016/s0306-4522(97)00233-9. PMID 9316021. Wikidata Q42444992.
- P Tanapat; N B Hastings; T A Rydel; Galea, Liisa; E Gould (2001). "Exposure to fox odor inhibits cell proliferation in the hippocampus of adult rats via an adrenal hormone-dependent mechanism". The Journal of Comparative Neurology. 437 (4): 496–504. doi:10.1002/cne.1297. PMID 11503148. Wikidata Q43705947.

== Personal life ==
Galea is married and has two children.
