= Paternal brain =

Brain changes in male parent

Changing hormone levels during pregnancy and postpartum as well as parental experience cause changes in the parental brain. Both the father and mother undergo distinct biological changes as they transition to parents, but the changes that occur in the paternal brain are not as well studied. Similar to the changes that occur in the maternal brain, the same areas of the brain (amygdala, hypothalamus, prefrontal cortex, olfactory bulb etc.) are activated in the father, and hormonal changes occur in the paternal brain to ensure display of parenting behavior. In only 5% of mammalian species, including humans, the father plays a significant role in caring for his young. Paternal caregiving has independently evolved multiple times in mammals, and can appear in some species under captivity.

Paternal behavior in humans takes many forms, including feeding, carrying, and playing with one's child.

== Paternal brain networks ==
The same neural systems that motivate maternal behavior also are responsible for paternal behaviors. There is evidence for this in rodents; the same neurons in a small region of the hypothalamus responsible for maternal behavior is also responsible for paternal behavior. Specifically, galanin neurons in the medial preoptic area of the hypothalamus are responsible for parental motivation. The medial preoptic area activates the mesolimbic dopamine system, typically a reward pathway but is also responsible for motivation to approach offspring. Parental empathy is thought to rely on the thalamocingulate pathway. These brains areas and others are activated and made sensitive to infants with changing hormonal levels and increased sensitivity to hormones by up-regulating hormonal receptors.

The embodied simulation network (anterior insula; premotor areas; inferior parietal lobule) are significantly activated in the paternal brain while watching or hearing their own infants compared to unknown infants.

In humans, in addition to the subcortical areas there is recruitment of higher order neural systems to respond to infant cues such as the neocortex and the prefrontal cortex.

fMRI studies have looked at brain activation in response to cues such as a baby's cry and show that this exposure activates the prefrontal cortex and the amygdala in both fathers and mothers, but not in non-parents.

Fathers show activation of the emotional regulation network, just like mothers, as seen in activation of the anterior insula, inferior frontal gyrus, hippocampus, and medial prefrontal cortex. This network is associated with caregiving sensitivity, and may become more robust through direct involvement in caregiving.

Fathers show activation in mentalization-related brain areas in response to their infant. These regions are important for processing others' emotional cues and mental states, allowing fathers to understand and process the emotional state of their infant.

== Paternal neural changes ==
Changes in neurogenesis in the prefrontal cortex of the paternal brain have been linked in some species to recognition of kin. In father rats, just as in the mother rats, a decrease in neurogenesis in the hippocampus occurs postpartum. Just like in mothers, fathers also have increased levels of glucocorticoids which are thought to suppress the production of new cells in the brain.

Marmoset fathers have enhanced dendritic spine density in the prefrontal cortex. This increase correlates with increase in vasopressin receptors in this area of the paternal brain. With age, this effect is reversed, and is therefore believed to be driven by father-infant interactions.

Human males show changes in gray matter and cortical thickness after becoming fathers. After becoming fathers, males show decreases in gray matter volume in the orbitofrontal cortex, posterior cingulate cortex and insula, and show increases in gray matter volume in the hypothalamus, amygdala and striatum and lateral prefrontal cortex, regions that are important for parental motivation.

== Paternal hormonal effect ==
An increase in levels of oxytocin, glucocorticoids, estrogen and prolactin occur in the paternal brain. These hormonal changes occur through the father's interaction with the mother and his offspring.

=== Testosterone ===
Testosterone levels have been shown to decrease with the onset of parenthood. Fathers experience large declines in both waking and evening levels of testosterone in comparison to nonfathers. Childcare has been shown to correlate with declining levels of testosterone, with more time spent with the child corresponding to a greater decline in testosterone. This relationship also has been found in fathers that cosleep with their child. The level of testosterone in the paternal brain also correlates with the effectiveness of the father's response to the baby's cry.

=== Oxytocin ===
Oxytocin has been shown to correlate with many aspects of paternal care, but its mechanisms and the systems involved are not fully understood. Oxytocin is associated with behaviors involving contact with the child. Increases in oxytocin following high contact interactions have been shown in correlational studies. Oxytocin's interactions with other hormones is thought to be responsible for creating variability in parent behaviors such as sensitivity to infant cues and parent-child synchrony. It is being researched as a possible area for intervention in parents that are considered high risk (premature birth, postpartum depression, environmental conditions).

=== Prolactin ===
Prolactin levels rise in males after becoming fathers in many species, including those that do not lactate. They are highest during the infantile period of the offspring, and positively correlate with caregiving. Increased prolactin corresponds to different behavioral changes in different species. In some bird species it is shown to correlate with increased gathering of resources. In humans, it has been shown to correlate with many aspects of care such as the level of involvement in care and increased exploratory play with the child. Increased levels of prolactin in the paternal brain has also been correlated with a more positive response to the infant's cry.

Experienced fathers of newborns show a significantly greater increase in prolactin after hearing their baby's cries or holding their babies than first-time fathers, suggesting that learning is important for males to develop responsiveness.

=== Vasopressin ===
In prairie voles, the neuropeptide vasopressin was found to induce paternal behaviors in virgin-offspringless males suggesting it has a critical role.

=== Cortisol ===
Cortisol concentrations are highest just prior to birth in both mothers and fathers. Higher basal cortisol and higher cortisol in response to holding the infant is associated with greater paternal behavior in men.
