= Parental brain =

Brain changes from parental experience and hormones

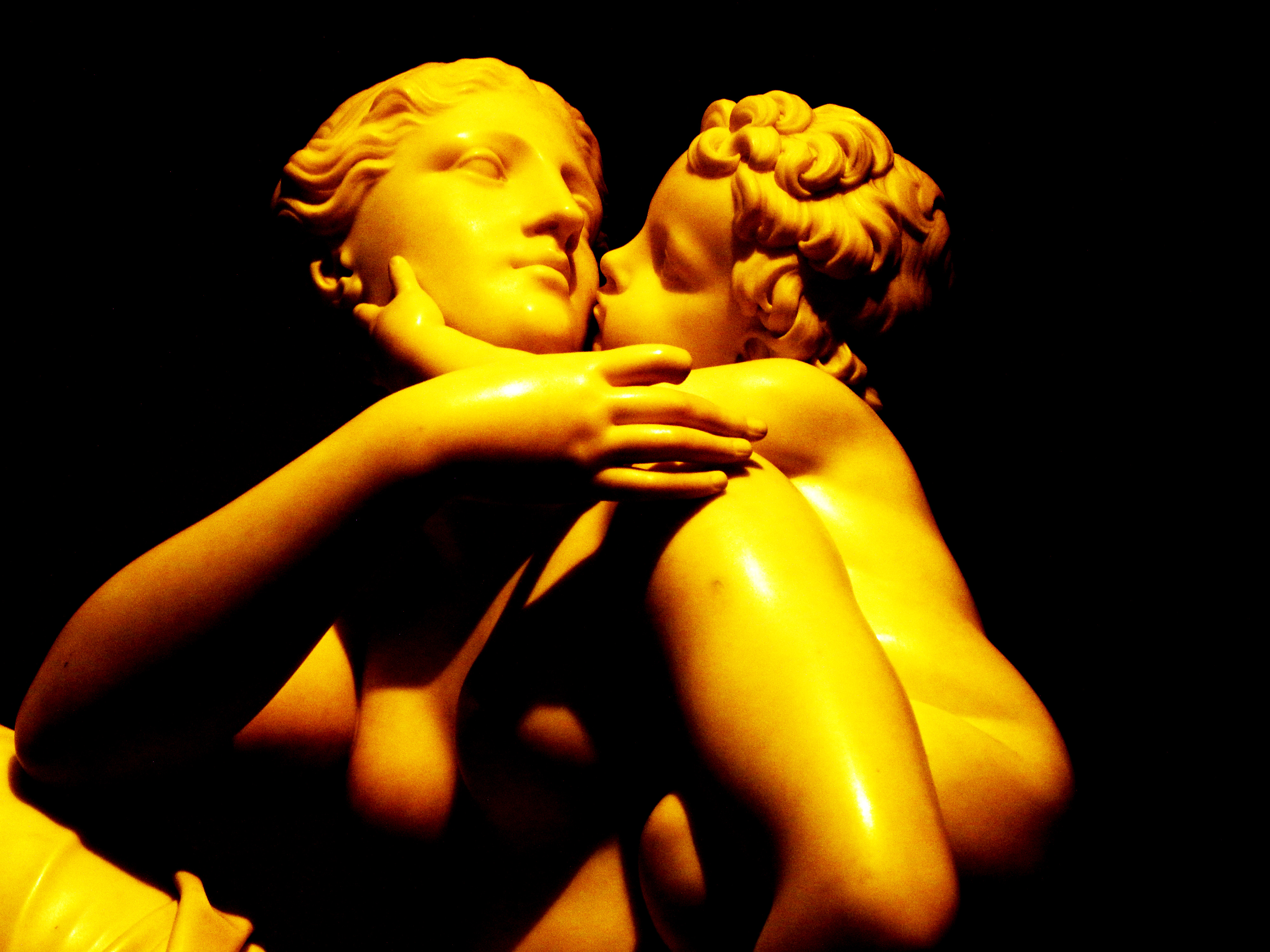
Maternal affection, by Edward Hodges Baily

Parental experience, as well as changing hormone levels during pregnancy and postpartum, cause changes in the parental brain. Displaying maternal sensitivity towards infant cues, processing those cues and being motivated to engage socially with their infant and attend to the infant's needs in any context could be described as mothering behavior and is regulated by many systems in the maternal brain. Research has shown that hormones such as oxytocin, prolactin, estradiol and progesterone are essential for the onset and the maintenance of maternal behavior in rats, and other mammals as well. Mothering behavior has also been classified within the basic drives (sexual desire, hunger and thirst, fear, power/dominance etc.).

Less is known about the paternal brain, but changes in the father's brain occur alongside the mother. Research on this topic is continuing to expand as more researchers examine fathers. Many of the brain regions and networks responsible for parental behavior are responsible for parental behavior in human fathers after having a child. Changes in hormones, brain activation and brain structure (mainly changes in gray matter) are seen in both human mothers and fathers, with hormonal changes beginning in both males and females before the birth of their children, with changes continuing to develop after the birth of children.

== Maternal brain ==
=== Maternal hormonal effect ===
Different hormone levels in the maternal brain and the overall well being of the mother account for 40%–50% of differences in the mother's attachment to her infant. Mothers experience a decrease in estrogen and an increase in oxytocin and prolactin caused by lactation, pregnancy, parturition and interaction with the infant.

==== Oxytocin ====
The levels of oxytocin in the maternal brain correlate with maternal behaviors such as gazing, vocalization, positive affect, affectionate touch and other similar mother-infant relationship behaviors.

==== Estradiol and progesterone ====
High mother-infant attachment correlates with a higher ratio of estradiol/progesterone at the end of pregnancy, than at the beginning.

==== Cortisol ====
In the first few days after giving birth the levels of cortisol are high which correlates with maternal approach behavior and positive maternal attitudes. Mothers with high levels of cortisol were also found to be more vocal towards their children. Mothers who experienced adversity in their own childhood, had higher daily patterns of cortisol levels, and were less maternally sensitive.

==== Glucocorticoids ====
Glucocorticoids are not essential for displaying maternal behaviors, but in mothers, the levels of glucocorticoids are elevated as to initiate lactation.

=== Neuroanatomy ===
Different areas/structures of the brain are associated with different factors which contribute to maternal behavior. One's own infant acts as a special stimulus which triggers activation of different areas of the brain. These brain areas together allow for maternal behavior and related systems.

The Medial Preoptic Area (MPOA) of the hypothalamus contains receptors for estradiol, progesterone, prolactin, oxytocin, vasopressin and opioids. All these hormones are involved in some way in activating maternal behavior in the brain. The following are other behavioral changes necessary for mothering that the MPOA is responsible for:

- mother's affect (changes made by the amygdala, prefrontal cortex)
- stimulus salience (changes made by the amygdala and nucleus accumbens)
- attention (changes made by the nucleus accumbens and medial prefrontal cortex)
- memory (changes made by the nucleus accumbens and medial prefrontal cortex).

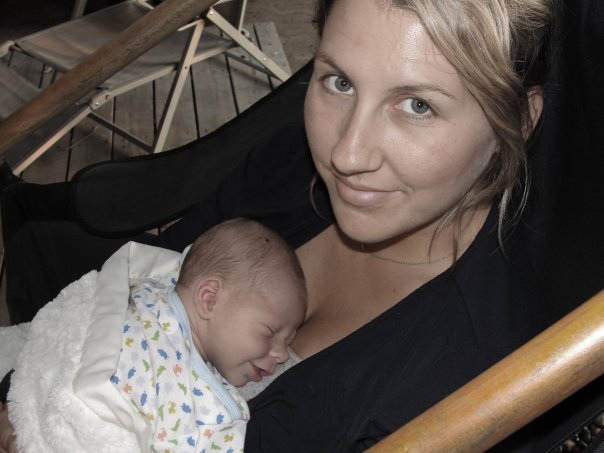
Skin-to-skin contact with a newborn helps to increase the mother's oxytocin

The amygdala and medial prefrontal cortex also contain receptors for the hormones which are most likely to be changing behavior at the time of pregnancy, and may be the sites where these changes occur. Increased activity has also been observed in the amygdala as the mother is responding to emotions seen in negative (fearful) faces, positive faces or familiar faces that her baby makes. Primate mothers with damage to the prefrontal cortex have also been associated with disrupted maternal behavior.

The dorsolateral prefrontal cortex (DLPFC) plays a role in the attention, cognitive flexibility and working memory of the mother. It helps the mother identify infant cues. In any environment and efficiently, it allows for the decision-making and action planning process involved in attending to the infant's cues.

The thalamus, parietal cortex, and brain stem serve for processing the smell, touch and vocalization associated with the infant.

=== Postpartum changes ===
Changes in estrogen, oxytocin and prolactin in the early postpartum period cause changes in the structures of the maternal brain.

==== In animal mothers ====
Postpartum, new neuron production is suppressed due to decreased levels of estrogen and increased levels of glucocorticoids in mother rats. Mother-infant interaction is also thought to suppress neurogenesis in the hippocampus postpartum in the rat maternal brain. Maternal experience increases neurogenesis in the subventricular zone (SBZ) which is responsible for producing the neurons of the olfactory bulb. Prolactin is the hormone which mediates the increase in neurogenesis in SBZ.

In animals, structures of the mother's brain change postpartum due to the increased interaction of the mother with the infant.

The volume of gray matter increases postpartum in the following brain regions:

- bilateral hypothalamus
- amygdala
- substantia nigra
- globus pallidus.

These changes in the brain may occur in order to promote appropriate mothering behavior. The mother's positive attitude towards the infant can be used as a predictor for the increase in gray matter in the above stated brain structures.

Also in rats, the increased interaction with pups causes an increase in density in the MPOA. Postpartum increase in gray matter volumes may help the mother activate the motivation to perform maternal behavior in response to cue from their offspring.

Postpartum, the substantia nigra activates positive responses to the pup stimuli via dopamine neurons.

==== In human mothers ====
The amygdala, prefrontal cortex and hypothalamus begin to change during pregnancy due to the high levels of stress experienced by the mother during this time.

In human mothers there was a correlation between increased gray matter volume in the substantia nigra and positive emotional feelings towards the infant.

Other changes such as menstrual cycle, hydration, weight and nutrition may also be factors which trigger the maternal brain to change during pregnancy and postpartum.

Maternal experience alters behaviors which stem from the hippocampus such as enhancing spatial navigation learning and behaviors linked with anxiety.

Recent research has begun to look at how maternal psychopathology affects the maternal brain in relation to parenting. Daniel Schechter and colleagues have studied specifically interpersonal violence-related posttraumatic stress disorder (PTSD) and comorbid dissociation as associated with specific patterns of maternal neural activation in response to viewing silent video-stimuli of stressful parent-toddler interactions such as separation versus less-stressful ones such as play. Importantly, less medial prefrontal cortex activity and greater limbic system activity (i.e. entorhinal cortex and hippocampus) were found among these post-traumatically stressed mothers of toddlers compared to mothers of toddlers without PTSD in response to stressful parent-child interactions as well as, within a different sample, in response to menacing adult male-female interactions. In the latter study, this pattern of corticolimbic dysregulation was linked to less observed maternal sensitivity during mother-child play. Decreased ventral-medial prefrontal cortex activity in violence-exposed mothers, in response to viewing their own and unfamiliar toddlers in video-clips of separation versus play, has also been associated with increased PTSD symptoms, parenting stress and decreased methylation of the glucocorticoid receptor gene.

=== Early experiences and shaping ===
Women who had a positive experience involving their family in their childhood are more likely to be more maternally sensitive and provide that same experience for their own children. Mothers that had negative experiences involving their families undergo neurobiological changes which lead to high stress reactivity and insecure attachment. This causes lower maternal responsiveness to their infant's needs.

Rat mothers provide high levels of maternal care (licking and grooming) to their offspring if they themselves received high maternal care as a pup from their own mothers. Rat mothers who received low levels of maternal care as pups have lower levels of expression of the glucocorticoid receptor gene and lower synaptic density in the hippocampus. In human mothers, lower hippocampal volume has been associated with a lower ability to regulate emotions and stress, which can be linked with decreased maternal sensitivity as a mother. Mothers with insecure attachments to their own mothers display higher amygdala sensitivity to negative emotional stimuli, like hearing their infant cry. Having more difficulty dealing with stress makes mothers less responsive to their infant's cues.

Larger gray matter and increased activations of the following brain areas occur in mothers who had experienced higher quality maternal care as infants:

- middle temporal gyrus
- superior temporal sulcus and
- middle frontal cortex.

This allows the mother to be more sensitive to her own infant's needs.

Postpartum depression has also been associated with mothers who received low quality maternal care early in their own life.

== Paternal brain ==
In only 6% of mammalian species, including humans, the father plays a significant role in caring for his young. Similar to the changes that occur in the maternal brain, the same areas of the brain (amygdala, hypothalamus, prefrontal cortex, olfactory bulb etc.) are activated in the father, and hormonal changes occur in the paternal brain to ensure display of parenting behavior.

=== Paternal hormonal effect ===
An increase in levels of oxytocin, glucocorticoids, estrogen and prolactin occur in the paternal brain. These hormonal changes occur through the father's interaction with the mother and his offspring. Oxytocin levels are positively correlated with the amount of affection the father displays towards the child. In humans, and in other primate species, lower levels of testosterone have been linked to the display of paternal behavior.

=== In animal fathers ===
In father rats, just as in the mother rats, a decrease in neurogenesis in the hippocampus occurs postpartum. Just like in mothers, fathers also have increased levels of glucocorticoids which are thought to suppress the production of new cells in the brain.

Marmoset fathers have enhanced dendritic spine density in the prefrontal cortex. This increase correlates with increase in vasopressin receptors in this area of the paternal brain. With age, this effect is reversed, and is therefore believed to be driven by father-infant interactions.

Changes in neurogenesis in the prefrontal cortex of the paternal brain have been linked in some species to recognition of kin.

=== In human fathers ===
Being exposed to crying babies activates the prefrontal cortex and the amygdala in both fathers and mothers, but not in non-parents. The level of testosterone in the paternal brain correlates with the effectiveness of the father's response to the baby's cry. Increased levels of prolactin in the paternal brain has also been correlated with a more positive response to the infant's cry. Similar to mothers, fathers have a reduction of gray matter in the orbitofrontal cortex areas, and increase of gray matter in the hypothalamus and amygdala after having a child.
